= Newton River (Buller River tributary) =

Coordinates: 41.776753°S 172.178164°E

Newton River (Tasman)
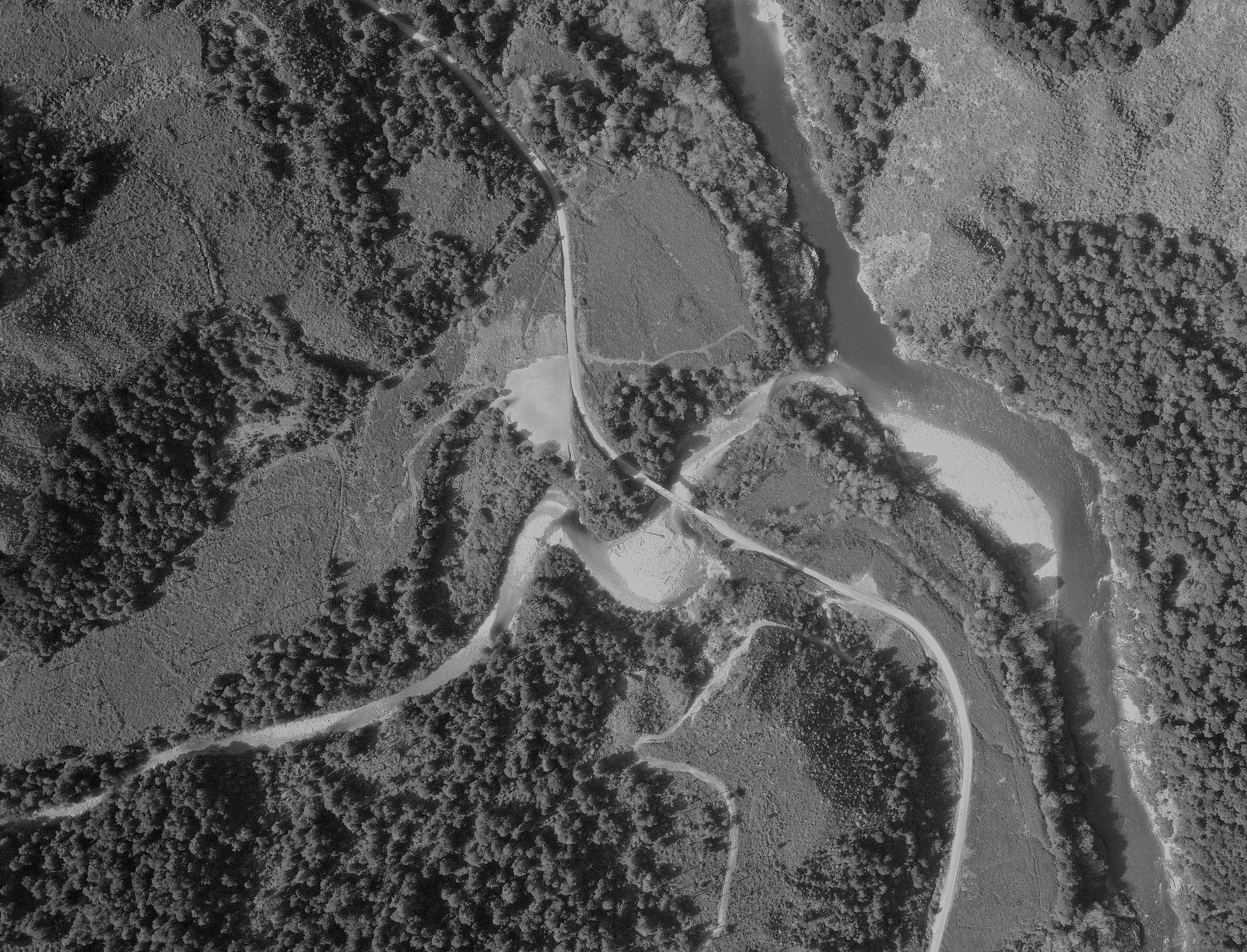
- Newton / Buller River confluence in 1964

- Mouth

Location
- Country: New Zealand

Physical characteristics
- Source
  - location: Mount Newton
  - elevation: 1,359 m (4,459 ft)
- Mouth
  - location: Buller River
  - elevation: 100 m (330 ft)
- Length: 20 km (12 mi)

Newton River in the Tasman District (there is also a Newton River in Fiordland), flows west and then south for about 20 km (12 mi) from Mount Newton to the Buller River, 17 km (11 mi) west of Murchison. Near its mouth it is crossed by SH6 on a steel truss bridge with a 120 ft (37 m) main span and two 30 ft (9.1 m) side spans.

Newton River is an official name, gazetted on 27 May 2021. It was named by Nelson Province engineer, John Blackett, during an expedition in April 1863.

The Old Ghost Road cycle trail runs along the north and west sides of the catchment.

In 1873 the Provincial Council agreed to put a footbridge over the river and from 1875 the road from Nelson was extended to Lyell. By 1880 a road and bridge had been built and gold miners were working the area. By 1901 about 50 miners were at work for the Newton River Sluicing Company, which was said to be successful in 1904, but their 96 acres (39 ha) of mining lease, 6 water races and 3 tail races were liquidated in 1905. Much damage was done by the 1929 Murchison earthquake and the bridge was then swept away in a subsequent flood. It was rebuilt in 1931 and enlarged for high sided vehicles in 2016.

Red deer, goats and pigs live in the beech forest. A groundbeetle, Bembidion bullerense, is found near the mouth of the river. Wildlife formerly in the catchment include South Island piopio, probably seen in 1946, great-spotted kiwi (roroa) and whio, seen in 2004.
