= Newton River =

Newton River may refer to the following in New Zealand:

- Newton River (Fiordland), located in the Southland Region
- Newton River (Buller River tributary), located in Tasman District
