= Mokihinui Hydro =

Proposed hydro scheme in New Zealand

- Country: New Zealand
- Coordinates: 41°33′16″S 172°1′53″E
- Status: Cancelled
- Owner: Meridian Energy

Thermal power station
- Primary fuel: Hydropower

Power generation
- Nameplate capacity: 85 MW (114,000 hp)

The Mokihinui Hydro was a proposed hydroelectric dam and power station planned for conservation land on the Mōkihinui River on the West Coast of New Zealand. The project by Meridian Energy was expected to cost $300 million.

In April 2010, resource consents to dam the Mōkihinui River were granted to Meridian. In May 2010 the Department of Conservation lodged an appeal with the Environment Court. On 22 May 2012 Meridian Energy cancelled the project, withdrawing it from the Environment Court. The project was withdrawn due to high costs and environmental concerns and the project's risks and uncertainties.

== Description ==
The 85-megawatt (114,000 hp) power station was expected to generate up to 360 gigawatt-hours (1,300 TJ) a year, or 14 percent more than the annual electricity consumption of the entire West Coast region (317 gigawatt-hours (1,140 TJ)). It would also provide much needed electricity generation to the Upper South Island, as local generation is well short of local demand and most of the electricity has to be transmitted from the Waitaki Valley, over 600 kilometres (370 mi) away. The dam was proposed to be 85 metres (279 ft) high and the resulting 14 kilometres (8.7 mi) long lake would have covered 330 hectares (3.3 km^{2}) of native forest.

== Consultation ==
In 2007, Meridian Energy Limited consulted affected parties about its proposal to place a hydro-electric dam on the Mōhikinui River. The dam would have been located 3 kilometres (1.9 mi) upstream from Seddonville, between it and the Mōkihinui River Forks. Meridian Energy began investigating the proposal in 2006, following from similar studies conducted by the New Zealand Ministry of Works in the 1960s and 1970s. On 15 March 2008, the West Coast Regional Council called for public submissions on Meridian's applications for resource consents. Forest and Bird opposed the dam and accused Meridian of not making public a report from Landcare Research that advised that the hydro scheme would cause significant adverse environmental effects.

== Recreational use after construction ==
Meridian Energy stated that there would be recreational benefits with the lake formed by the proposed dam. Boat ramps would be provided for access onto the new lake. A local trust planned and built a 85 km walking and mountain biking track, called the Old Ghost Road, pushed through to Lyell, following a historic gold miners' route. This would have been impossible with the river being dammed.

== Opposition ==
Opposition to the proposal had been expressed by a number of conservation, recreational, environmental and fishing organisations including:

- Buller Conservation Group
- Council of Outdoor Recreation Associations of NZ
- Department of Conservation
- Federated Mountain Clubs
- Fish and Game New Zealand
- Royal Forest and Bird Protection Society of New Zealand
- Green Party of Aotearoa New Zealand
- NZ Federation of Freshwater anglers
- New Zealand Historic Places Trust
- NZ Rafting Association
- NZ Recreational Canoeing Association
- West Coast Environmental Network
- West Coast Tai Poutini Conservation Board
- West Coast Waitbaiter's Association
- World Wildlife Fund NZ

The opposition was due to number of reasons: the river and the 330-hectare (820-acre) of forest that would be inundated has high intrinsic natural values, it is regarded as a scenic river, and it has valued recreational use for whitewater activities and tramping.

In April 2010, the Department of Conservation stated that it had lodged an appeal with the Environment Court of the decision to grant the resource consents to Meridian Energy.

== See also ==
- Electricity sector in New Zealand
- List of power stations in New Zealand
