= Mangles River =

River in the Tasman District, New Zealand

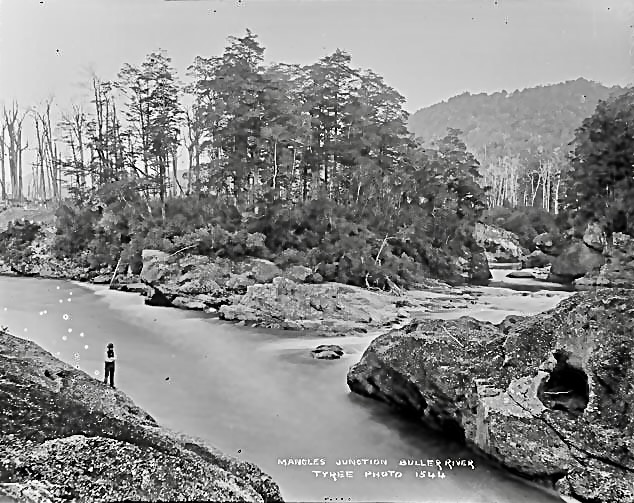
- Confluence of Mangles and Buller Rivers, circa 1900
- Route of the Mangles River
- Mouth of the Mangles River Mangles River (South Island)

Location
- Country: New Zealand

Physical characteristics
- Source
  - location: Nuggety Creek Road
  - coordinates: 41°46′00″S 172°28′54″E
  - elevation: 540 m (1,770 ft)
- Mouth
  - location: Buller River
  - coordinates: 41°47′14″S 172°22′06″E
  - elevation: 180 m (590 ft)
- Length: 25 km (16 mi)

Basin features
- Progression: Mangles River → Buller River → Tasman Sea
- Tributaries
  - left: Te Pātītī Stream, Te Peita Stream, Te Wīriki Stream, Tūtaki River, Blackwater River, Blue Duck Creek, Grey Duck Creek, Green Duck Creek
  - right: Campbell Creek, Harte Creek

The Mangles River is in the South Island of New Zealand. Its main tributary is the Tūtaki River but it is also fed by water flowing off the Braeburn Range. It feeds into the Buller River near the town of Murchison. The river is popular destination for kayaking and trout fishing.

William Fox was the New Zealand Company agent in Nelson when he explored the Buller as far south as Murchison in February 1846, with Thomas Brunner and Charles Heaphy. They renamed the lower section of the Tiraumea River, after the English MP, Ross Donnelly Mangles, one of the company's directors. The official name was gazetted as Mangles River on 27 May 2021.

River pollution has been monitored since 2016. About 75% of the catchment is in native forest, so that water quality is generally good, the only exception being nitrates.

The river is bridged by SH6 near its confluence with the Buller.
