= List of shipwrecks in July 1869 =

The list of shipwrecks in July 1869 includes ships sunk, foundered, grounded, or otherwise lost during July 1869.

== 1 July ==
List of shipwrecks: 1 July 1869
Ship	State	Description
Bruce	New Zealand	The paddle steamer foundered when she turned broadside on to the surf at the mouth of the Grey River. All crew and passengers were saved.
Fagel	Netherlands	The ship was driven ashore and wrecked at Karang Bolong, Java, Netherlands East Indies. She was on a voyage from Tjilatjap, Java to Amsterdam, North Holland.
Golden Age	United Kingdom	The ship ran aground on a reef off "Kera Island". She was on a voyage from "Zebu" to Sydney, New South Wales. She was refloated and put in to Coepang, Netherlands East Indies in a leaky condition. It was found that two holes had been bored in her bottom with an auger.
Weser	Flag unknown	A message in a bottle washed up near Boscastle, Cornwall on 28 October. A message written in German claimed the ship had foundered with the loss of all 346 people on board. LLoyd's stated that no such vessel was known to them, nor was any German emigrant ship missing.

== 2 July ==
List of shipwrecks: 2 July 1869
Ship	State	Description
Alexander	Russia	The ship ran aground in the River Nene and was damaged. She was on a voyage from "Skouvik" to Wisbech, Cambridgeshire, United Kingdom. She was refloated and taken in to Wisbech.
Alfred Storer	United Kingdom	The ship was wrecked in the Strait of Sunda.
Eastham	United Kingdom	The ship was sighted in the Atlantic Ocean whilst on a voyage from South Shields, County Durham to Valparaíso, Chile. No further trace, presumed foundered with the loss of all eighteen crew.

== 3 July ==
List of shipwrecks: 3 July 1869
Ship	State	Description
E. A. B.	United Kingdom	The brigantine foundered in the North Sea. Her crew were rescued. She was on a voyage from Rotterdam, South Holland, Netherlands to Danzig.
Unnamed	United Kingdom	The fishing vessel ran aground off Texel, North Holland, Netherlands. Her crew were rescued.

== 4 July ==
List of shipwrecks: 4 July 1869
Ship	State	Description
Dreadnought	United States	The medium clipper was wrecked at Point Peñas, Chile. Her 34 crew took to a boat; they were rescued on 21 July by the barque General Birch (Norway). Dreadnought was on a voyage from Liverpool, Lancashire, United Kingdom to San Francisco, California.
Foam	United Kingdom	The fishing smack ran aground on the Noorden Haaks Bank, in the North Sea off the Dutch coast and was wrecked. Her crew were rescued. She was on a voyage from Ramsgate, Kent to the Nieuw Diep.
General Windham	United Kingdom	The full-rigged ship foundered in the Atlantic Ocean. Her crew were rescued by St. James (United Kingdom). She was on a voyage from Java, Netherlands East Indies to Amsterdam, North Holland, Netherlands.
Reunion	United Kingdom	The ship ran aground in the Shetland Islands. She was on a voyage from Kronstadt, Russia to Boston, Lincolnshire. She was refloated and taken in to Lerwick, Shetland Islands.

== 5 July ==
List of shipwrecks: 5 July 1869
Ship	State	Description
Philliphaugh	United Kingdom	The ship was wrecked on the Le Queot Rock, off the Casquets, Channel Islands. Her crew were rescued. She was on a voyage from Cartagena, Spain to South Shields, County Durham.

== 6 July ==
List of shipwrecks: 6 July 1869
Ship	State	Description
Notos	Hamburg	The barque was wrecked 5 nautical miles (9.3 km) west of Nash Point, Glamorgan, United Kingdom. Her crew were rescued. She was on a voyage from Hamburg to Cardiff, Glamorgan.
Observer	United Kingdom	The barque foundered in Morant Bay, Jamaica.
Harmonia	United Kingdom	On Monday July 5th 1869, the ship Harmonia (a 43m, 643 tonne barque, built in 1847 and registered in Aberdeen) left Quebec with 15 crew and a cargo of timber, bound for Aberdeen. Later that same day, some 200 miles off the Grand Banks of Newfoundland, a strong wind & heavy seas caused the ship to spring a leak and break a mast. At 11:30pm on July 6th the ship “fell over on her beam-ends, the masts being underwater” and the cabin and everything on deck was washed overboard. Eight crew, (the Captain Peter Ross, the mate, carpenter, sailmaker and four hands) were drowned. The seven remaining crew clung to the side of the boat until the masts gave way and the boat righted itself. They remained in the waterlogged and incapacitated ship until Thursday July 8th when they spotted the Renfrewshire out of Greenock approaching from the west and hoisted the house flag as a symbol of distress, They were rescued and taken back to Greenock, from where they returned to Aberdeen. The derelict ship remained afloat and was spotted by the ship ‘Nova Scotian’, which was heading from Liverpool to Quebec, on the 6th September, some two months after its loss “with loss of foremast, jibboom and three topmastheads” approx. 200 miles NW of Carrickfinn and 230 miles SW of Barra, approx. 1,500 miles from where it had been abandoned. On or around the 25th September 1869, the Harmonia wrecked on the west coast of Wiay off the coast of Skye. A Lloyd's of London report dated Saturday, October 2, 1869 stated: “In the night of the 25th Sept., a large timber-laden ship came ashore on the island of Vinay [Wiay], off Loch Bracadale, on the West coast of this island, and is a total wreck: the cargo, which is strewed about the coast, consists of oak logs, deals and staves, the logs marked C & JS & Co., the planks TJ, and the staves L & E. The vessel appears to have been abandoned at sea some time ago, her decks being covered with slime: one of the winches is marked 'HARMONIA, of Aberdeen, No. 2'.”

== 7 July ==
List of shipwrecks: 7 July 1869
Ship	State	Description
Josefina	Spain	The ship was driven ashore at Kilmore, County Wexford, United Kingdom. She was on a voyage from Havana, Cuba to Liverpool, Lancashire.
Margaretha	Netherlands	The schooner collided with the steamship Laplace (United Kingdom) and sank in the English Channel off Dungeness, Kent, United Kingdom. Her crew were rescued. She was on a voyage from Danzig to Newhaven, Sussex, United Kingdom.
Ocean Bride	United Kingdom	The ship was abandoned at sea.
Richmond	United Kingdom	The ship was wrecked at the mouth of the Rio Grande do Norte. She was on a voyage from Buenos Aires, Argentina to Queenstown, County Cork.
Sunbeam	United Kingdom	The ship ran aground in Lake St. Peter. She was on a voyage from Quebec City, Canada to London. She was refloated and resumed her voyage.
Unnamed	United Kingdom	The fireboat was run into and sank in the River Thames at Bermondsey, Surrey. Her crew were rescued.

== 8 July ==
List of shipwrecks: 8 July 1869
Ship	State	Description
Engineer	United Kingdom	The paddle tug was run down and sunk in the North Sea off Seaham, County Durham by the steam collier J. R. Hinde (United Kingdom) with the loss of a crew member.
Rosetta	United Kingdom	The steamship ran aground at Broom Hill, County Waterford. She was on a voyage from Bristol, Gloucestershire to Waterford. She was refloated.

== 9 July ==
List of shipwrecks: 9 July 1869
Ship	State	Description
Alexander	United Kingdom	The barque was driven ashore and wrecked at Covelong, India. She was on a voyage from Madras to Liverpool, Lancashire. She was consequently condemned.
Peter Maxwell	United Kingdom	The ship ran aground on Great Saltee, Cheshire. She was on a voyage from Saint John's, Newfoundland Colony to Liverpool. She was refloated and taken in to Liverpool in a waterlogged condition.
Roe	United Kingdom	The paddle steamer collided with the steamship Princess Royal (United Kingdom) off the Mull of Galloway, Wigtownshire and was severely damaged at the bows. She was on a voyage from Barrow-in-Furness, Lancashire to Belfast, County Antrim. She completed her voyage and was placed under repair.
Sir John Rae Reid	United Kingdom	The barque struck a floating object off Cape Trafalgar, Spain and foundered. Her twelve crew were rescued by the steamship Darro (Spain). Sir John Rae Reid was on a voyage from Alicante to Huelva, Spain.
Unnamed	Ottoman Empire	The ship was run into by the steamship Venetian (United Kingdom) and sank at Constantinople.

== 10 July ==
List of shipwrecks: 10 July 1869
Ship	State	Description
Hebe	United Kingdom	The ship sank in the North Sea. She was on a voyage from Mariensiel, Prussia to Grangemouth, Stirlingshire.
Jane	United Kingdom	The Humber Keel was run into by the steamship William Coleman (United Kingdom) and sank at Goole, Yorkshire with the loss of two lives.
Stone Merchant	United Kingdom	The sloop was run into by the steamship William Coulman (United Kingdom) and sank at Goole, Yorkshire with the loss of two lives.

== 11 July ==
List of shipwrecks: 11 July 1869
Ship	State	Description
Hibernia	United Kingdom	The ship was driven ashore and wrecked at Cape Fakli, Russia.

== 12 July ==
List of shipwrecks: 12 July 1869
Ship	State	Description
Abbey H. Swasey	United States	The fishing schooner was lost on Half Moon Beach, near Cape Negro, Nova Scotia. Crew saved.

== 13 July ==
List of shipwrecks: 13 July 1869
Ship	State	Description
Newcastle	United Kingdom	The paddle tug was run into by the steamship Pladda (United Kingdom) and sank in the River Tyne. Her three crew were rescued by Pladda.
Priscilla Eliza	United Kingdom	The schooner struck a rock off Porthgain, Pembrokeshire and was wrecked. Her crew were rescued. She was on a voyage from Porthgain to London.

== 14 July ==
List of shipwrecks: 14 July 1869
Ship	State	Description
Britannia	United Kingdom	The brig collided with another vessel and was severely damaged at Arkhangelsk, Russia. She was on a voyage from Arkhangelsk to Grangemouth, Stirlingshire. She put back to Arkhangelsk for repairs.
Trial	United Kingdom	The trow sprang a leak and sank at Bridgwater, Somerset. She was on a voyage from Newport, Monmouthshire to Bridgwater.
Zoulla	United Kingdom	The steamship struck a sunken rock and sank 20 nautical miles (37 km) south of Cape Curvoeira, Portugal. Her crew were rescued. She was on a voyage from Liverpool, Lancashire to Genoa, Italy.

== 15 July ==
List of shipwrecks: 15 July 1869
Ship	State	Description
Normanby	United Kingdom	The steamship was driven ashore and wrecked near Ericeira, Portugal. Her crew were rescued. She was on a voyage from South Shields, County Durham to Constantinople, Ottoman Empire.
Petermann	United Kingdom	The steamship foundered in the Indian Ocean. Her crew were rescued. She was on a voyage from Glasgow, Renfrewshire to Port Natal, Cape Colony.

== 16 July ==
List of shipwrecks: 16 July 1869
Ship	State	Description
Ghazepore	United Kingdom	The ship ran aground in the Jellingham Channel. She was on a voyage from Calcutta, India to Liverpool, Lancashire. She was refloated and resumed her voyage.

== 17 July ==
List of shipwrecks: 17 July 1869
Ship	State	Description
Alxeander	United Kingdom	The whaler, a steamship, was wrecked in the Davis Strait. Her crew were rescued by Erik (Denmark), Esquimaux and Ravenscraig (both United Kingdom).

== 18 July ==
List of shipwrecks: 18 July 1869
Ship	State	Description
Iron Age	United States	The steamship struck rocks near Tunis, Beylik of Tunis and sank. Her crew were rescued by the steamship Luxor (Flag unknown). Iron Age was on a voyage from Sulina, Ottoman Empire to Cork, United Kingdom.

== 19 July ==
List of shipwrecks: 19 July 1869
Ship	State	Description
Resolution	United Kingdom	The steamship was run into and sunk by the steamship Hero (United Kingdom) at Hull, Yorkshire. Her crew survived. She was on a voyage from London to Goole, Yorkshire.

== 21 July ==
List of shipwrecks: 21 July 1869
Ship	State	Description
Clansman	United Kingdom	The paddle steamer ran aground on a reef west of Sanda Island, Argyllshire and was wrecked. All on board were rescued by Celt (United Kingdom). Clansman was on a voyage from Stornoway, Isle of Lewis to Glasgow, Renfrewshire.
John Byron	United Kingdom	The abandoned schooner foundered in the North Sea 15 nautical miles (28 km) off Newbiggin Point, Northumberland.

== 24 July ==
List of shipwrecks: 24 July 1869
Ship	State	Description
Mary	United Kingdom	The ship departed from Akyab, Burma for Falmouth, Cornwall. No further trace, presumed foundered with the loss of all hands.

== 25 July ==
List of shipwrecks: 25 July 1869
Ship	State	Description
Clio	United Kingdom	The steamship collided with the steamship Niobe (United Kingdom) and sank in the Baltic Sea off the east coast of Gotland, Sweden with the loss of twenty of her 26 crew.
Sea Horse	United Kingdom	The ship was deliberately scuttled off Pernambuco, Brazil. Her crew were rescued by a Portuguese vessel. She was on a voyage from Cardiff, Glamorgan to Point de Galle, Ceylon.

== 26 July ==
List of shipwrecks: 26 July 1869
Ship	State	Description
Branch	United Kingdom	The schooner foundered in the Atlantic Ocean. Her crew were rescued. She was on a voyage from South Shields, County Durham to Porto, Portugal.

== 27 July ==
List of shipwrecks: 27 July 1869
Ship	State	Description
Kate	United Kingdom	The barque ran aground at Havre de Grâce, Seine-Inférieure, France and broke her back. She was on a voyage from Trinidad to Havre de Grâce.
Rapid, and Sylph	United Kingdom	Rapid ran aground at Wexford. She was run into by Sylph, which also ran aground. Sylph was on a voyage from Newport, Monmouthshire to Wexford.

== 28 July ==
List of shipwrecks: 28 July 1869
Ship	State	Description
Alma	Canada	The schooner departed from Charlottetown, Prince Edward Island, for Pictou, Nova Scotia. Presumed subsequently foundered with the loss of all hands; the body of her captain washed up near Point Prim, Prince Edward Island.

== 29 July ==
List of shipwrecks: 29 July 1869
Ship	State	Description
Balcarra	United Kingdom	The barque capsized and sank in the Atlantic Ocean with the loss of all hands.
Bigarenna	Spain	The ship departed from Havana, Cuba for Antwerp, Belgium. No further trace, presumed foundered with the loss of all hands.
Chevalier	United Kingdom	The ship was sighted in the Atlantic Ocean whilst on a voyage from Accra, Gold Coast to London. Presumed subsequently foundered with the loss of all hands; a chest belonging to her second mate washed ashore at Weymouth, Dorset in March 1870.
City of Edinburgh	United Kingdom	The ship foundered off the coast of Sumatra, Netherlands East Indies . Her crew were rescued. She was on a voyage from Rangoon, Burma to London.
Isabella	United Kingdom	The schooner foundered in the Irish Sea 20 nautical miles (37 km) south west of The Smalls. Her five crew were rescued by the barque Shirner (Norway).
Lorina	United Kingdom	The schooner was wrecked on the Abertay Sand, at the mouth of the River Tay with the loss of three of her four crew. She was on a voyage from Newcastle upon Tyne, Northumberland to Dundee, Forfarshire.
Nicholaus	Hamburg	The schooner was driven ashore on Scharhörn, Hamburg. She was on a voyage from an English port to Cuxhaven. She was refloated with assistance from the steamship Hercules and towed in to Cuxhaven.
Sea Gull	United Kingdom	The ship foundered in the Atlantic Ocean with the loss of all but two of her crew, according to a message in a bottle which washed up at Westward Ho!, Devon on 9 August.
Seine et Tamise	France	The ship struck a submerged object and sank at the bows at Antwerp, Belgium. She was on a voyage from Antwerp to London, United Kingdom.
Severn	United Kingdom	The steamship ran aground on the Haaks Bank, in the North Sea off the Dutch coast. Her sixteen crew were rescued. She was on a voyage from Danzig to Amsterdam, North Holland, Netherlands. Severn was refloated on 31 July, but then ran aground in the Nieuw Gat.
Zephyr	United Kingdom	The schooner collided with Exodus (United Kingdom) off Fairlight, Sussex. She was consequently beached at Dungeness, Kent. Her crew were rescued by a tug. She was on a voyage from Brest, Finistère, France to Chatham, Kent.

== 30 July ==
List of shipwrecks: 30 July 1869
Ship	State	Description
Dalton	United Kingdom	The barque was wrecked at "Porth Trecastel", Anglesey with the loss of a crew member. She was on a voyage from Chile to Liverpool, Lancashire. She was taken in to Holyhead, Anglesey on 15 August with the assistance of a tug.
Express	United Kingdom	The steamship ran aground in the River Avon at Sea Mills, Gloucestershire. She was on a voyage from Bristol, Gloucestershire to Aberystwyth, Cardiganshire. She was refloated on 1 July and taken in to Bristol for repairs.
John	United Kingdom	The ship foundered off Spurn Point, Yorkshire.
Prince Edward	(United Kingdom of Great Britain and Ireland) Victoria	The 194-ton brig foundered in a gale southwest of West Cape, New Zealand, while en route to Timaru. All ten on board survived, travelling by longboat to Bluff.
Surinam	United Kingdom	The ship ran aground on the Hogsty Reef. She was on a voyage from the Rio de la Hacha to Kronstadt, Russia. She was refloated and resumed her voyage.

== 31 July ==
List of shipwrecks: 31 July 1869
Ship	State	Description
Red Rose	United Kingdom	The ship put in to Dover, Kent on fire. She was on a voyage from London to Newport, Monmouthshire. She was severely damaged.
Tomogonops	United Kingdom	The ship departed from the Black River, Jamaica for a British port. No further trace, presumed foundered with the loss of all hands.

== Unknown date ==
List of shipwrecks: Unknown date in July 1869
Ship	State	Description
Alexandra	United Kingdom	The ship was driven ashore at "Coulong", India before 30 July. She was on a voyage from Madras, India to Liverpool, Lancashire.
Anne Wood	United Kingdom	The ship was driven ashore on Fortun Island, Spanish East Indies before 18 July. She was on a voyage from Manila to Cebu. She was refloated and put back to Manila, where she was condemned.
Augusta	Stettin	The ship foundered in the Atlantic Ocean. Her crew were rescued by Psyche (United Kingdom).
Carlsund	Sweden	The steamship was driven ashore at "Winga". She was on a voyage from Stettin to Christiania, Norway.
Chameleon	United States	The steamship was wrecked at Yokohama, Japan with the loss of 22 lives.
Grassendale	United Kingdom	The ship foundered off Cape Horn, Chile before 12 July. Her crew were rescued by Santiago (Chile). Grassendale was on a voyage from Sunderland, County Durham to San Francisco, California.
Lord Sidmouth	United Kingdom	The ship was wrecked in the Atlantic Ocean before 7 July.
Mabsden	United Kingdom	The ship caught fire and sank in the North Sea 180 nautical miles (330 km) north of Dunkirk, Nord, France before 29 July. All on board were rescued by Danzig (United Kingdom). Mabsden was on a voyage from Kronstadt, Russia to Dunkirk.
Miss Preston	United Kingdom	The ship was lost in the Sunda Strait before 4 July. She was on a voyage from Sunderland, County Durham to Singapore, Straits Settlements.
Rippling Wave	United States	The schooner was lost in the Strait of Magellan. Her crew were rescued.
Spartan	United Kingdom	The steamship ran aground on the Englishman's Shoal, in the Dardanelles. She was on a voyage from Antwerp, Belgium to Constantinople, Ottoman Empire. She was refloated and taken in to Constantinople.
St. Angelo	United Kingdom	The ship ran aground in at "Bialasawick", in the Sea of Azov. She was on a voyage from Newport, Monmouthshire to Taganrog, Russia. She was refloated and taken in to Taganrog, where she arrived on 19 July.
Two Emmas	United Kingdom	The ship foundered off the coast of Cornwall. She was on a voyage from the Clyde to Caen, Calvados, France.
Valparaiso	Flag unknown	The ship was wrecked on Palona Island, Uruguay.
