= Tiraumea River =

Tiraumea River is the name of two rivers in New Zealand.

- Tiraumea River (Manawatu-Wanganui)
- Tiraumea River (Tasman)
