= Little Hope River =

Coordinates: 41°39′S 172°40′E

Location
- Country: New Zealand

Physical characteristics
- Mouth
  - location: Hope River
- Length: 7 km (4.3 mi)

The Little Hope River is a river of the northwest of New Zealand's South Island. It flows from the western flank of the Hope Saddle, meeting with the waters of the Hope River after seven kilometres at the settlement of Glenhope. State Highway 6 follows the valley of the Little Hope River immediately after crossing the saddle.

== See also ==
- List of rivers of New Zealand
