= Fyfe River =

River in the Tasman District, New Zealand

- Route of the Fyfe River
- Mouth of the Fyfe River Fyfe River (South Island)

Location
- Country: New Zealand

Physical characteristics
- Source: Marino Mountains
  - coordinates: 41.517°S 172.494°E
- Mouth
  - location: Owen River
  - coordinates: 41°37′21″S 172°30′55″E

Basin features
- Progression: Fyfe River → Owen River → Buller River → Karamea Bight → Tasman Sea
- Tributaries
  - right: Frying Pan Creek

The Fyfe River is a river in the Tasman District of New Zealand. It arises in the Marino Mountains near Mount Owen and flows north, then south-west, south and south-east to join the Owen River, a tributary of the Buller River, which eventually exits into the Tasman Sea.

A Department of Conservation-maintained tramping track follows the river, and can be used for access to Mount Owen.

== See also ==
- List of rivers of New Zealand
