= Blackwater River (Tasman) =

Coordinates: 41°49′20″S 172°23′40″E

- Mouth

Location
- Country: New Zealand

Physical characteristics
- Mouth
  - location: Mangles River
- Length: 20 km (12 mi)

The Blackwater River in Tasman flows due north along a long straight valley, parallel to and equidistant from, the Mātakitaki and Tutaki Rivers, reaching the Mangles River just to the east of the town of Murchison. It is some 20 kilometres (12 mi) in length.
