= Braeburn Range =

Mountains in New Zealand

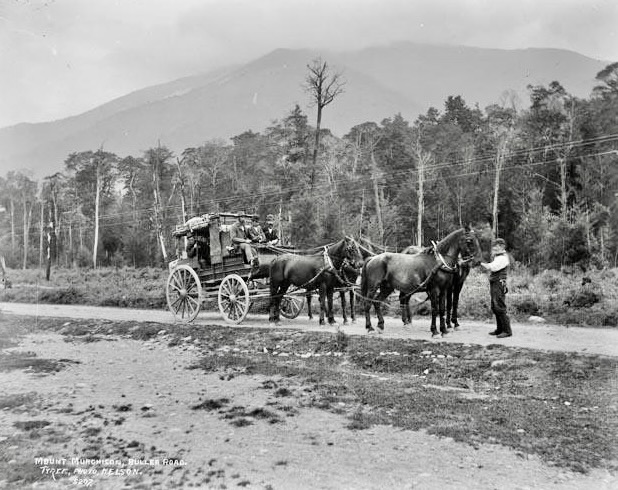
- Mount Murchison from the Buller Road, probably around 1900

Highest point
- Peak: Mount Murchison
- Elevation: 1,469 m (4,820 ft)
- Coordinates: 41°43′48″S 172°29′59″E

Dimensions
- Length: 23 km (14 mi) NW - SE

Geography
- Country: New Zealand
- Region: Tasman Region
- Topo map: LINZ 250-18 Murchison

The Braeburn Range is a mountain range in the Tasman Region of New Zealand's South Island. It lies to the west of Lake Rotoroa and much of the eastern flank of the range is within the Nelson Lakes National Park. The range runs south-southeast, with a westwards curve at the northern end and several westward-trending spurs.

The northernmost and highest peak of the range is the 1,469 metres (4,820 ft) Mount Murchison overlooking the Buller River. The southern endpoint of the range is Mount Hutton (1,400 metres (4,600 ft)) above the Tiraumea Saddle. The higher Ella Range lies to the south. Other peaks include Mount Pickering (1,249 metres (4,098 ft)), Mount Cotton (1,256 metres (4,121 ft)), Mount Baring (1,127 metres (3,698 ft)), and Twins (1,152 metres (3,780 ft)). The bush line is around 1,350 metres (4,430 ft) in this area, so only the two highest peaks are not covered in bush. There is a radio and television transmission mast on top of Mount Murchison.

The area above the bush line on Mount Murchison is one of three isolated habitats for an as-yet unnamed species of large alpine carnivorous land snail, currently known as Powelliphanta "Nelson Lakes". Living beneath tussocks and mountain flax, these snails have survived summer grazing by sheep and cattle in the past. Pigs are still considered a threat. A more widespread variety, Powelliphanta "Matakitaki" is found in bush above 1200 metres south of Mount Murchison. It is also the only known site of Veronica societatis, a small grassland hebe first discovered by members of the Nelson Botanical Society and named after the society in 2002.

The area is popular for hunting, with red deer, pigs, chamois and goats to be found. The range is crossed by one track navigable by four-wheel-drive vehicles, the Braeburn Track, which connects the outlet of Lake Rotoroa with the upper Mangles River valley via a saddle at 650 metres (2,130 ft). The Tiraumea tramping track crosses the saddle at the southern end of the range, following the Tiraumea River.
