= Deepdale (disambiguation) =

Deepdale is the stadium of Preston North End football club, in Preston, England

Deepdale may also refer to:

== Places in England ==
- Deepdale, Preston, the area in which Deepdale stadium is located
- Deepdale, Cumbria, a valley in the Yorkshire Dales National Park
- Deepdale, Lincolnshire, a hamlet in North Lincolnshire
  - Deepdale Hoard, found in 1979
- Deepdale, North Yorkshire, a hamlet in Langstrothdale in the Yorkshire Dales
- Deepdale, County Durham, a wooded side valley of Teesdale
- A former name of Dale Abbey, Derbyshire

== Other ==
- Deepdale, Western Australia, a suburb of Geraldton
- Deepdale River, South Island, New Zealand
