= Norwegian Rock =

Norwegian Rock (53°2′S 73°19′E) is a sunken rock outside the entrance to West Bay, about 1.2 nautical miles (2.2 km) southeast of West Cape, off the west side of Heard Island. The name Norwegian Rock appears in a supplement to the 1930 British Admiralty Antarctic Pilot and probably reflects the work of Norwegian whalers in the vicinity in that general period. The form Norwegian Rock was recommended by Antarctic Names Committee of Australia (ANCA) in 1954.
