= Powelliphanta "Nelson Lakes" =

Conservation status
- Range Restricted (NZ TCS)

Scientific classification
- Kingdom: Animalia
- Phylum: Mollusca
- Class: Gastropoda
- Order: Stylommatophora
- Family: Rhytididae
- Genus: Powelliphanta
- Species: P. "Nelson Lakes"

Binomial name
- Powelliphanta "Nelson Lakes"

Species of gastropod

This is a yet-unnamed Powelliphanta species, provisionally known as Powelliphanta "Nelson Lakes". This is one of the amber snails. It is an undescribed species of large, carnivorous land snail, a terrestrial pulmonate gastropod mollusc in the family Rhytididae. The area above the bush line on Mount Murchison in the Braeburn Range is one of three isolated habitats for this species.

== Conservation status ==
Powelliphanta "Nelson Lakes" is classified as Range Restricted by the New Zealand Threat Classification System.
