= Owen River =

River on New Zealand's South Island

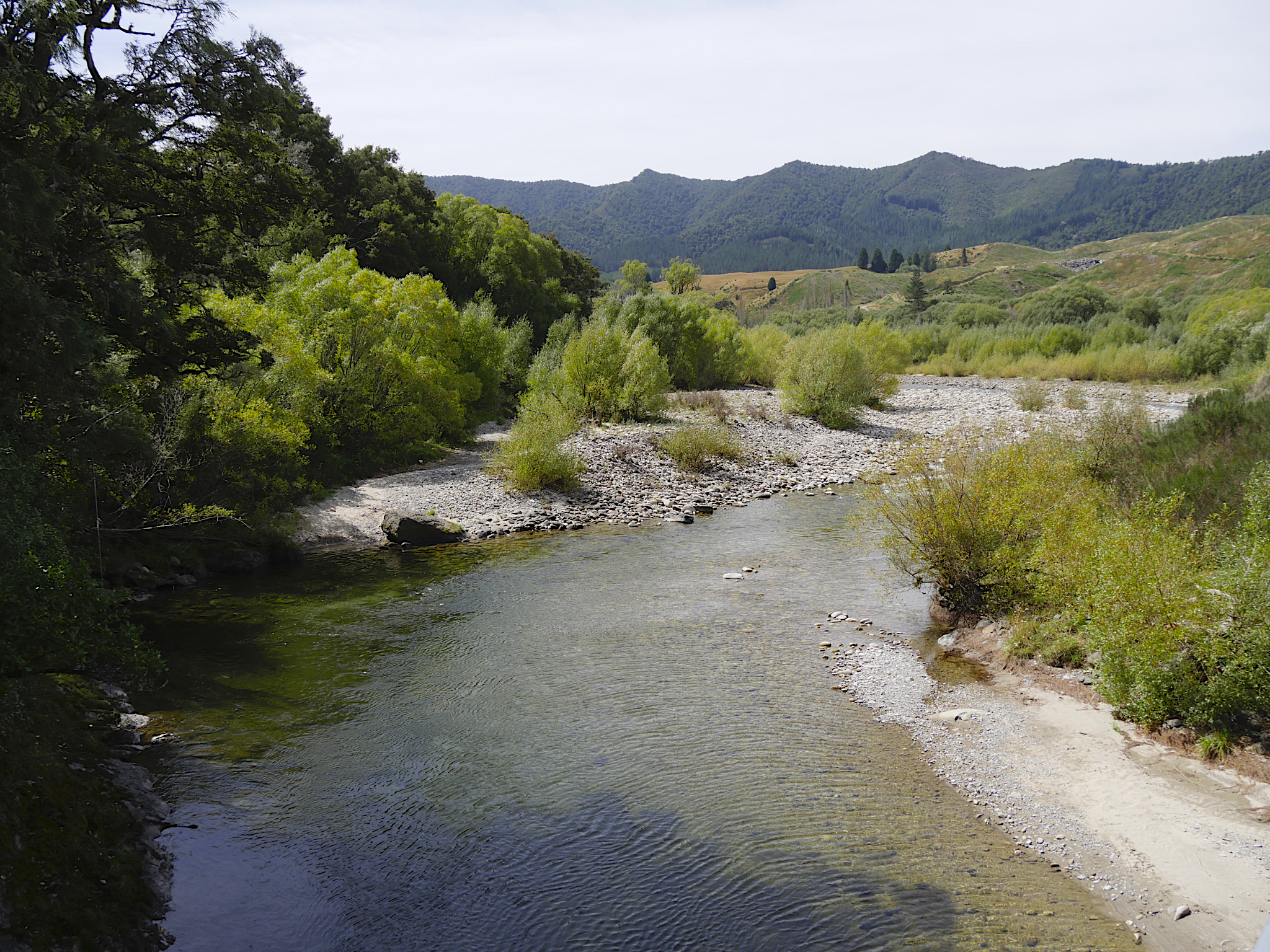
- A northeast view of the river
- Route of the Owen River
- Mouth of the Owen River Owen River (South Island)

Location
- Country: New Zealand
- Island: South Island
- District: Tasman

Physical characteristics
- Source
  - location: Mount Owen
  - coordinates: 41°31′52″S 172°34′34″E
- Mouth
  - location: Buller River
  - coordinates: 41°41′12″S 172°26′55″E
- Length: 20 kilometres (12 mi)

Basin features
- Progression: Owen River → Buller River → Tasman Sea
- Tributaries
  - left: Three Mile Creek, Sluice Box Creek, League Creek, Coal Creek, Halfway Creek, Carrol Creek, Brewery Creek,
  - right: Caledonian Creek, Bulmer Creek, Carton Creek, Zealandia Creek, Advance Creek, Fire Creek, Fyfe River, Baigent Creek

The Owen River is located in the northwest of New Zealand's South Island. This short river is an upper tributary of the Buller River. It flows 20 km (12 mi) south from its headwaters on the slopes of Mount Owen in Kahurangi National Park, and then into the Buller at the small settlement of Owen River 18 km (11 mi) northeast of Murchison.
