= Blackwater River (Buller River tributary) =

Coordinates: 41°50′55″S 171°47′30″E

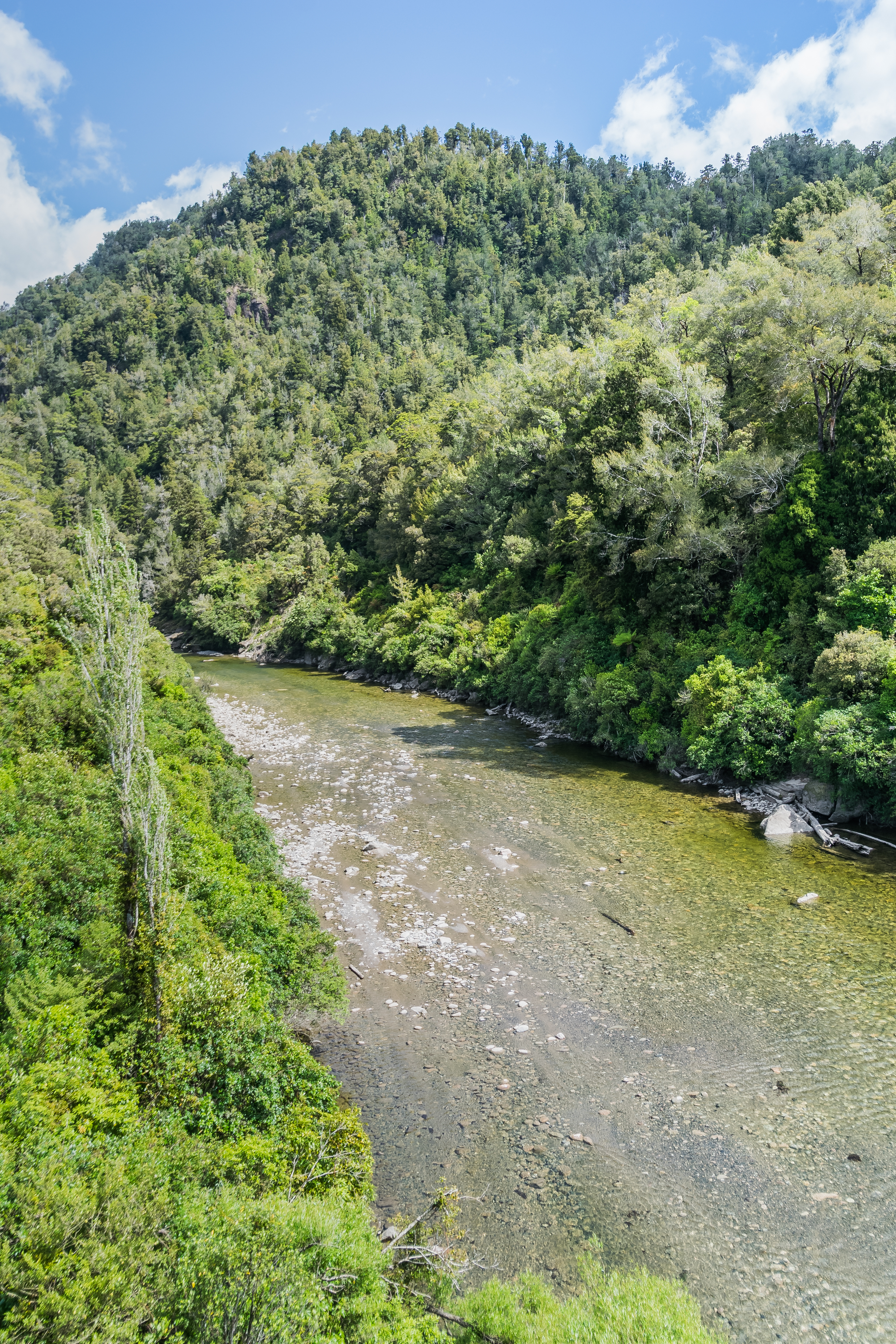
- Blackwater River from State Highway 6

- Mouth

Location
- Country: New Zealand

Physical characteristics
- Source
  - location: Paparoa Range
- Mouth
  - location: Buller River
- Length: 19 km (12 mi)

The Blackwater River is located in the Buller District of New Zealand. It flows north-northwest for 19 kilometres (12 mi) from the northern slopes of Mount Copernicus in the Paparoa Range, reaching the Buller River 16 kilometres (9.9 mi) west of Inangahua in the lower Buller Gorge.
