= Buller River =

River in New Zealand

Buller
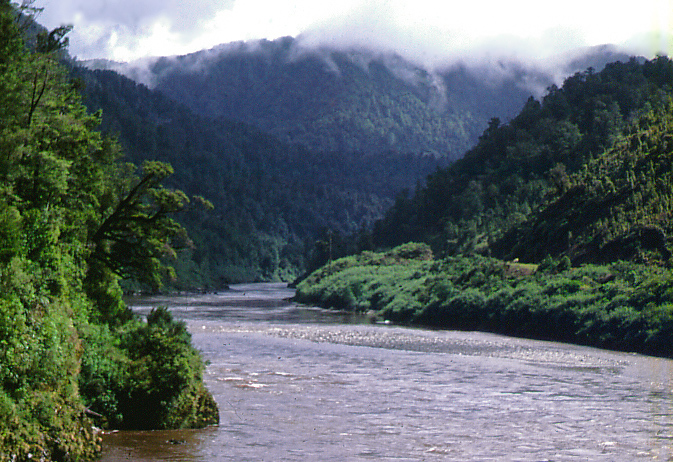
- Buller River near Berlins

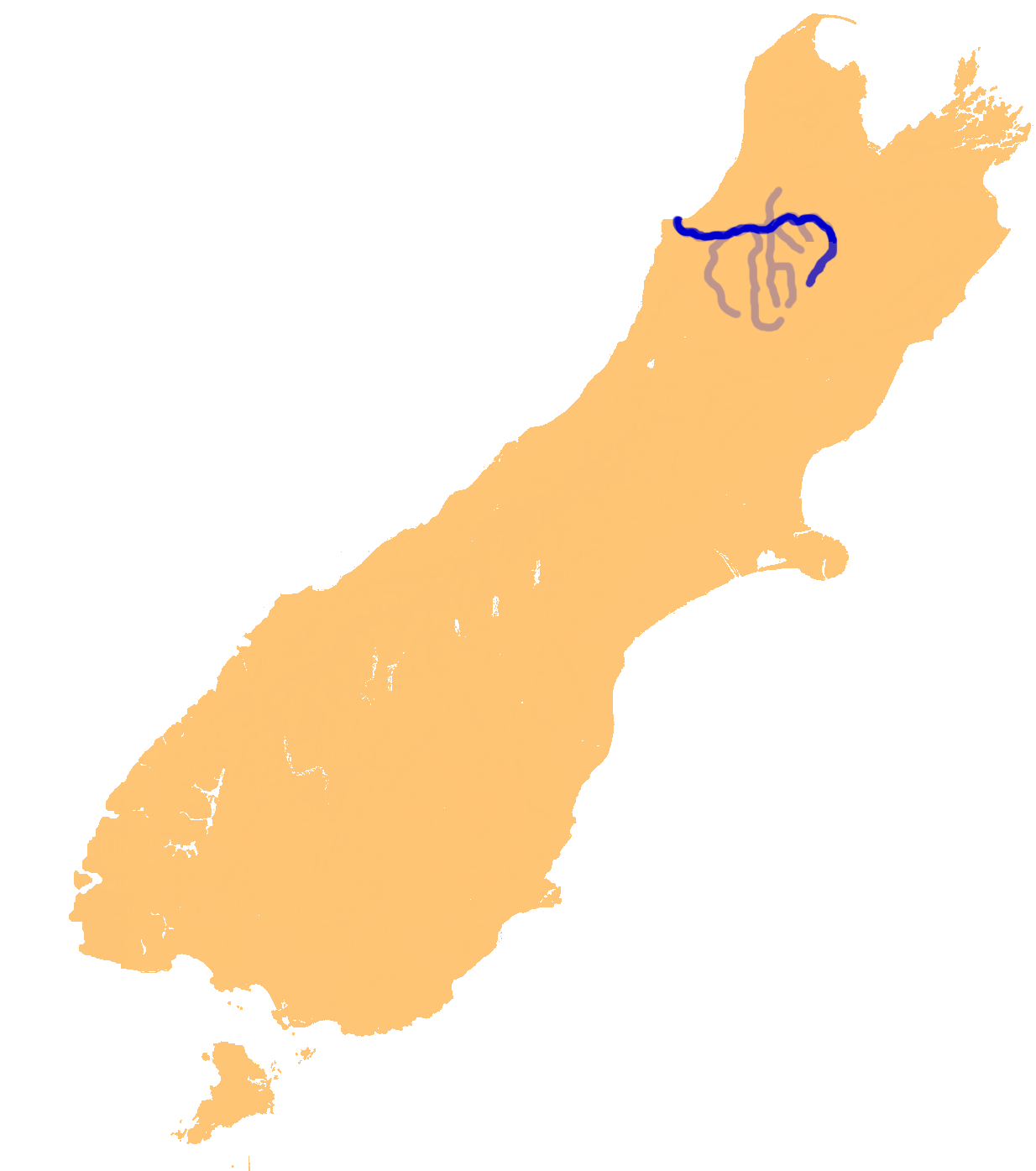
- The Buller River system
- Etymology: named for Charles Buller
- Native name: Kawatiri (Māori)

Location
- Country: New Zealand
- Region: Tasman, West Coast
- Cities: Saint Arnaud, Murchison, Westport

Physical characteristics
- Source: Southern Alps (Saint Arnaud Range)
  - location: Lake Rotoiti, New Zealand
  - coordinates: 41°48′10″S 172°49′20″E
  - elevation: 620 m (2,030 ft)
- Mouth: Tasman Sea
  - location: Karamea Bight, New Zealand
  - coordinates: 41°43′45″S 171°35′20″E
  - elevation: 0 m (0 ft)
- Length: 177 km (110 mi)
- Basin size: 6,350 km^{2} (2,450 sq mi)
- Discharge
  - average: 429 m^{3}/s (15,100 cu ft/s)

Basin features
- Tributaries
  - left: Travers, Hinemoatū, Gowan, Mangles, Matakitaki, Maruia, Deepdale, Inangahua, Blackwater, Ohikanui
  - right: Hope, Owen, Matiri, Newton, Ōhikaiti, Ōrikaka

The Buller River (Māori: Kawatiri) is a river in the South Island of New Zealand. The Buller has the highest flow of any river in the country during floods, though it is only the 13th longest river; it runs for 177 km (110 mi) from Lake Rotoiti through the Buller Gorge and into the Tasman Sea near the town of Westport. A saddle at 710 m (2,330 ft) separates the Buller from the Motupiko River and that is divided from the Wairau River by a 695 m (2,280 ft) saddle, both aligned along the Alpine Fault, as is the top of the Buller valley.

Within the Buller Gorge and downstream from the Deepdale River joining, the Buller crosses from Tasman District into Buller District. The Paparoa Range separates the Buller River from the Grey River. A number of flora and fauna are found in the Buller catchment, many of these extending onto the slopes of the Paparoa Range.

The Buller River upstream from Murchison along with the Mangles River are popular for whitewater kayaking and recreational fishing, though the whole river can be kayaked; it is the only major river in the country with no hydro lakes, though a seismic survey for hydro power was done in 1973. For experienced canoeists the Ariki Falls section, between Murchison and Newton Flat, is also popular and novices can use it by carrying kayaks around the rapids, except when the river is very low and the rapids become unnavigable. The river is suitable for contact recreation approximately 95% of the time, though Tasman Council recognises it needs to be better because of the popularity of whitewater kayaking below Gowan Bridge.

State Highway 6 follows the river for 132 km (82 mi), SH63, upstream from SH6, for 23 km (14 mi) and the Stillwater–Ngākawau railway line runs through the Lower Gorge to Westport. State Highway 6 follows the river for much of its length.

This river has an annual mean flow of 454 cubic metres per second (16,000 cu ft/s), is estimated to have reached 12,700 m^{3}/s (450,000 cu ft/s) in the 1926 flood and has the highest flood flow in the country of over 7,640 cubic metres per second (270,000 cu ft/s). 93% of the water comes from the western mountains, which make up only 38% of the catchment, and it is highest in summer, partly due to melting snow.

== History ==
=== Early history ===
Excavations at the mouth of the river, across from Westport, uncovered 77 stone adzes, 2,693 stone flakes (argillite, chert, obsidian and silcrete from manufacture of stone tools), minnow lures, moa bone, sites of huts, ovens, middens and urupā, with one shell carbon dated to between 1219 and 1316. Early trading is indicated by argillite from Ohana, at the south end of D'Urville Island, chert from upper North island and obsidian from Mayor Island / Tūhua. In 2004 the site was described as one of the largest and best preserved large Archaic sites in the country. More investigation may reveal whether it was occupied for more than a few years.

Subsequent pre-colonial history is obscure. The Waitangi Tribunal concluded that, "very little is known about the history of Ngāti Apa's occupation of the region . . . invasion by northern tribes in the early nineteenth century made it difficult to pass on any substantial record of the traditional history of this area" and it was "probably an area of migratory resource use rather than permanent occupation". One migratory resource was Ngāi Tahu's pounamu trade, which had a greenstone trail through the valley, probably in summer, when the river would usually be lower. By virtue of a taua of 1829–1832, Ngāti Toa Rangatira was recognised in 2012 as having an interest in the upper part of the river.

=== European settlement ===
Europeans first discovered Lake Rotoiti in 1842. The first written record of the river mouth was in 1845, when a sealing captain, Joseph Thoms, was reported as finding, "a large river, a mile wide. It has a bar at the entrance, on which he took soundings, and found sixteen feet at high water. The river appeared to be navigable for a considerable distance. Mr. Thoms anchored his vessel in five fathoms, and pulled up four or five miles in his boat. He describes the valley through which the river runs to be twenty miles wide, finely wooded, with some open land."

In 1846 Brunner was the first European to follow the full length of the Buller, together with his guide, E Kehu, of Ngāti Tūmatakōkiri, who already knew the area well (Ekehu had been taken prisoner by Ngāi Tahu while living near the Grey River). That expedition lasted almost 560 days. The journey was so difficult that they left Lake Rotoiti on 31 December 1846, but only reached the mouth of the river on 4 June 1847. They returned up the Buller, leaving Inangahua on 23 March 1848 and reached Lake Rotoiti again on 12 June 1848.

Surveyor John Rochfort discovered gold and coal in the Buller valley in 1859. Despite this indication of the land's value, the 1860 Arahura Deed sold most of the West Coast to the government for £300 (about 1d per 100 acres), covering a total of 7,000,000 acres (2,800,000 ha), which included virtually all of the Buller valley south from the Gowan River.

A West Coast gold rush, coal mines and timber sawmills resulted in a rapid population increase in the 1860s. By 1867 there were 6,087 miners in Nelson Province and 10,466 people (and 1,612 tents, indicating the temporary nature of their stay) in Westland North, which also included the Grey valley. About 1,500 were in Westport in 1867, which was then the 3rd largest port for exporting gold, after Hokitika and Dunedin.

==== Name ====
William Fox was the New Zealand Company agent (a UK-based company of 1837, with a royal charter supporting colonisation efforts) in Nelson, when he, Thomas Brunner and Charles Heaphy, explored the Buller as far south as Murchison in February 1846. In a report to Colonel Wakefield, Fox said, "As it will present a considerable feature on the maps of this island, I have called it the Buller, after the member for Liskeard", who was Charles Buller, a UK Member of Parliament and director of the New Zealand Company.

The original Māori name for the Buller may have been Kawatiri, although Patrick O'Regan thought that was a misunderstanding of Ka Awatiri. He translated Awatiri as a rapid river. The first 1846 expedition named the Buller valley around Murchison as the Aglionby valley, after the English MP, Henry Aglionby Aglionby. In 1911 O'Regan suggested it had dropped out of use because it was hard to pronounce.

==== River modifications ====
Organs Island was created, about 6 km (3.7 mi) upstream from Westport, when a loop in the Buller was bypassed by a straight flood relief channel built between 1882 and 1886. The old river course became silted up between 1925 and 1945, but part of it remains to allow Buller floodwater to overflow into the Orowaiti River. A wall in that overflow was repaired in 2022 after flooding.

==== Transport ====
Until roads were built, goods were carried from Westport to Lyell in fleets of canoes, or, later, horse-drawn boats, carrying up to 7 tons, or 12 tons up to Inangahua. They could take 11 weeks to make the journey, but the 40 mi (64 km) from Lyell could also be covered in 7 hours downstream.

Roads in the valley evolved. In good weather a footpath was passable along the length of the valley by 1864. Horses could usually travel from Nelson to Lyell by 1867 and wheeled traffic by 1876. A dray road opening from Inangahua to Lyell in 1878 facilitated animal-drawn transport vehicles.

A telegraph line opened to Lyell in 1874.

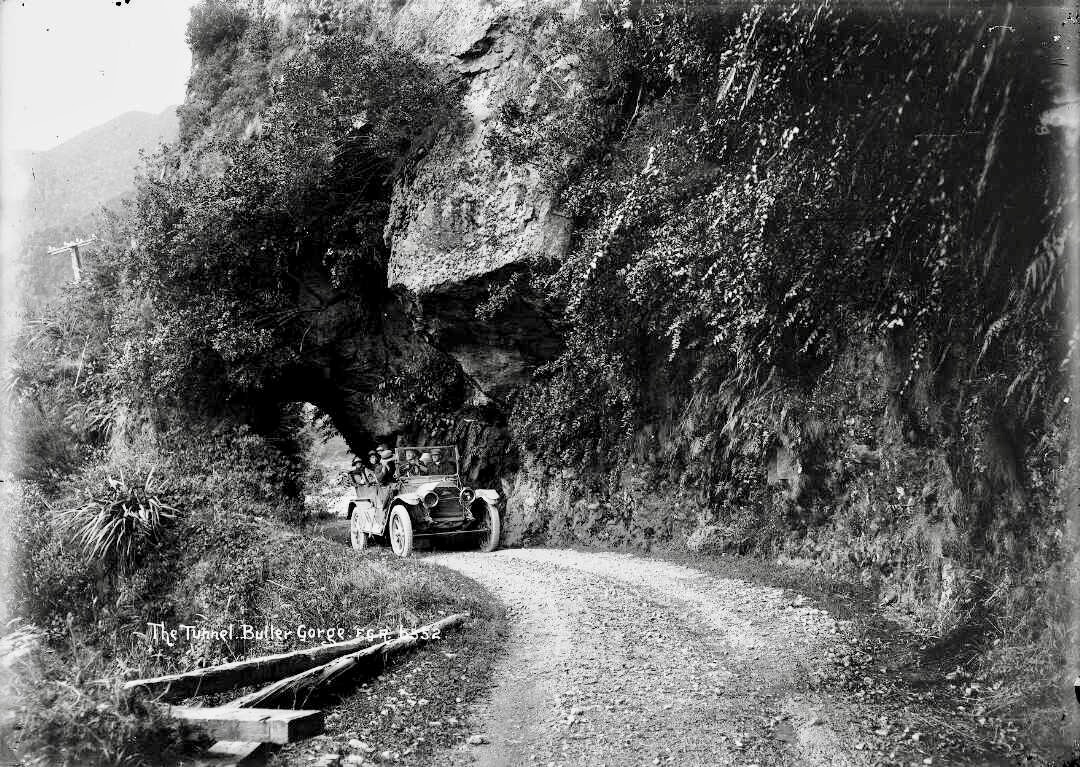
Buller Gorge about 1920, Fern Arch near Tiroroa

Job Lines began a link between Westport and Reefton in 1876, using horses from Westport and a coach from the Landing to Reefton. By July 1877 the road through the Lower Gorge had improved sufficiently for the coach to run through to Westport. The road near Tiroroa included two short tunnels, until Fern Arch was demolished in 1937.

The first Newman Brothers coach ran between Foxhill (end of the Nelson railway) and Hampden (Murchison) on 22 July 1879, following improvements to the road, was extended to Lyell in 1880 and, by Job Lines, to Reefton in 1882. A motor service began in 1913, allowing the journey between Westport and Nelson to be made in a day. A daily bus linking Nelson and Westport began in 1923. InterCity now runs buses on 4 days a week, taking 3 hours 29 minutes, including a 15 minute break at Murchison. By car the 217 km (135 mi) route takes a bit under 3 hours.

In 1964 the Nelson-Murchison Railways Road Services route was taken over by Nelson Suburban Bus Co.

===== Bridges =====
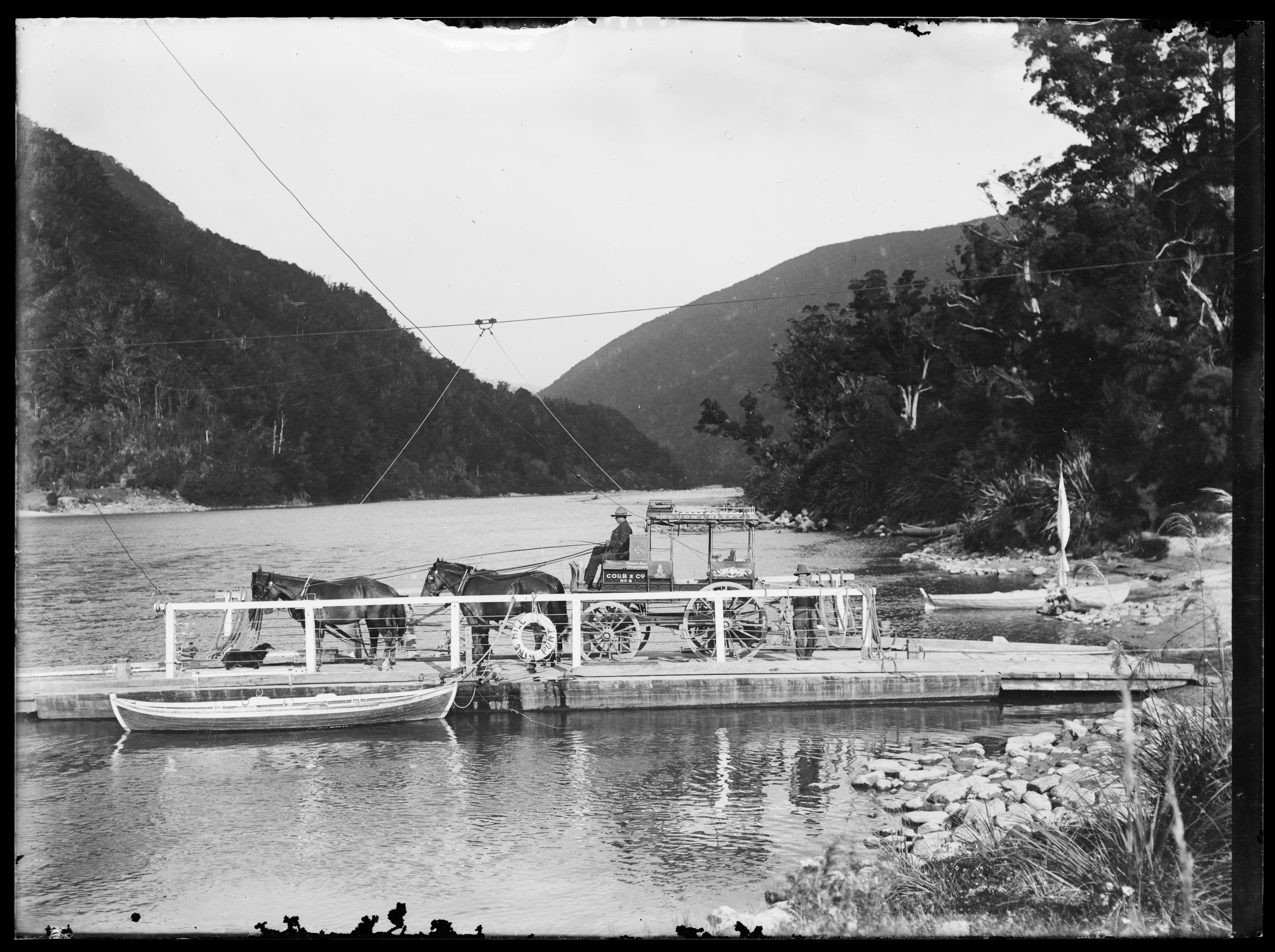
- Newman Brothers coach on the Nine Mile punt about 1910
  The first bridge up the river is Buller Bridge, opened in 1888 as a road-rail bridge on the Cape Foulwind Railway and built by M'Lean and Son of Wellington for £13,704 15s 6d. It was a 1,040 ft (320 m) long, iron lattice bridge. That original bridge was replaced in 1976 by a concrete road bridge, slightly upstream. A ferry, and later a punt, crossed the river from Nine Mile Road, Te Kuha, from 1874. The punt was swept away in a 1908 flood, five horses were drowned and the coach was left in shallow water. It also broke free, or was damaged, in 1909 and 1926 floods. The last punt was built about 1914 and it closed in 1927.
- By 1911 there was a 725 ft (221 m) suspension bridge over the river, just downstream from Buller. Between 1928 and 1931 a 540 ft (160 m) suspension footbridge was also built over the river, 19 mi (31 km) from Westport, to link the railway construction workers' camp to the railway. It's sometimes not clear in accounts which bridge is being described. Both bridges had gone by 1972.
- Buller River bridge No.89, on the Stillwater–Ngākawau Line, crosses the river near Inangahua. It is 206 m (676 ft) long, on 6 x 100 ft (30 m) spans, resting on 8 ft (2.4 m) diameter piles.
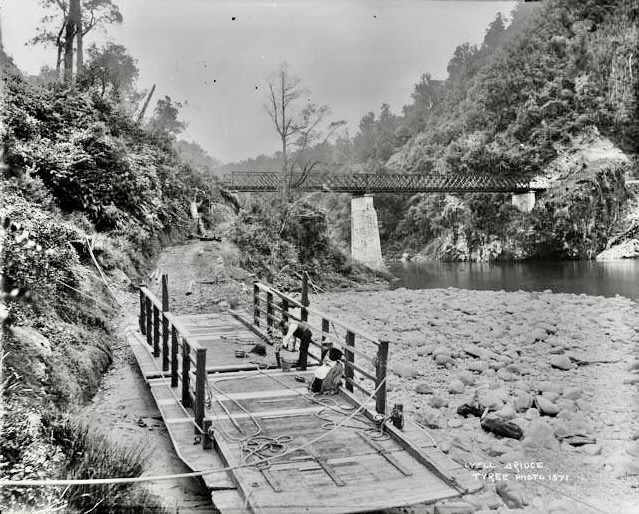
- Lyell punt and bridge about 1890. It is now the oldest bridge over the river
  Iron Bridge at Lyell, on SH6, was built by J & A Anderson of Christchurch for £8,957 and replaced the punt on 4 August 1890. The Warren truss bridge spans 168 ft (51 m), supported by a central pier in the river.
- Buller Gorge Swingbridge (suspension bridge) is about a kilometre below Ariki Falls. It is 110 m (360 ft) long and 19 m (62 ft) above the river.
- O'Sullivan's Bridge, also on SH6, was built in 1908 and rebuilt in 1975.
- Longford Bridge, also on SH6, was rebuilt in 1966. The pre-stressed concrete, box girder bridge is 316 ft (96 m) long, with a main span of 170 ft (52 m), 42 ft (13 m) above normal water level. It was built 1 mi (1.6 km) upstream of the 1899 single-lane, wooden, suspension bridge and cost £47,490.
- Nuggety Creek Bridge was built about 1919 to give access to Nuggety Creek Road and now has a 25 tonne weight limit.
- Gowan Valley Bridge was built between 1914 and 1917.
- Harleys Rock Bridge at Devils Grip, on SH63, was first built about 1875 and upgraded about 1928. The present concrete bridge was built in 1979.
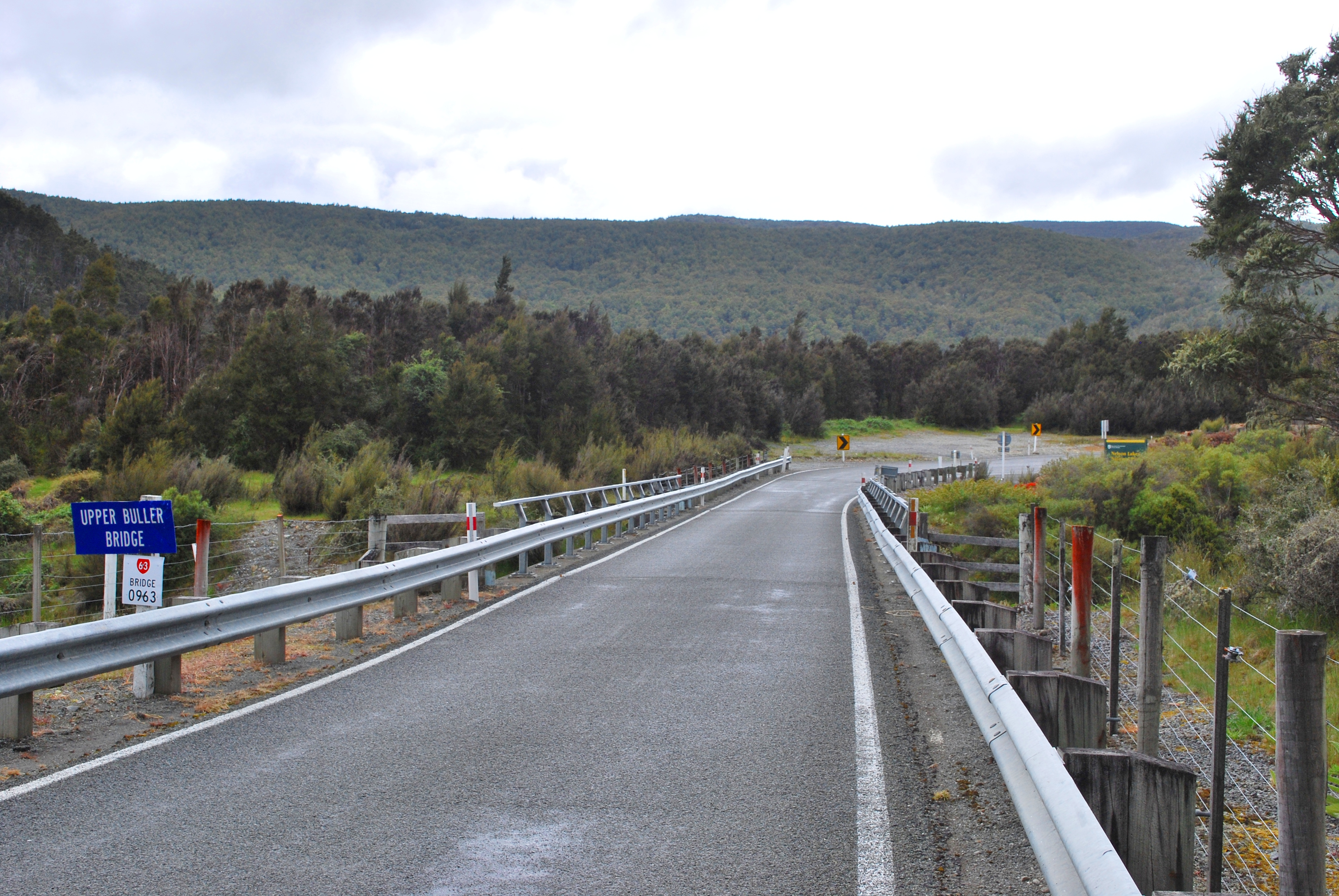
- Upper Buller Bridge in 2011
  Upper Buller Bridge is on SH63. It was built in 1868 and rebuilt in 1928 and 1981.
- Buller Bridge on Mount Robert Road was built about 1955 and rebuilt in 2015.

== Natural history ==
In 1846 the land around what was later Westport was described as covered to the river edge with tōtara and kahikatea. Much of the river flows through beech forest, with matagouri scrub and mānuka in the upper reaches. Carmichaelia (New Zealand broom) grows in the lower valley, especially around Lyell. Along the river most lowland forest on the fertile alluvial soils has been felled, but stands of kahikatea and rimu remain in some inland lowland basins. Other trees and bushes in the valley include mountain akeake, daisy bush, Hector's tree daisy, Dracophyllum densum, mountain cedar, mountain neinei, mountain toatoa, mountain and silver beech, pink pine, yellow-silver pine, southern rātā and small rimu. Among other plants there are wire rush, eyebright and ferns such as Gleichenia dicarpa, Gleichenia microphylla Leptopteris superba and Hymenophyllum rufescens.

Black-fronted terns and black-billed gulls nest in braided stretches of the river, especially near the Hinemoatū River. Great spotted kiwi (roa) live in the upper valley. Other birds include Australasian bittern (matuku hūrepo) long-tailed cuckoo (koekoeā), New Zealand falcon (kārearea), fernbird (kōtātā), New Zealand pipit (pihoihoi), rifleman (titipounamu), western weka kererū, tūī, korimako, riroriro, pīwakawaka, tauhou and morepork (ruru).

Speckled skinks (Oligosoma infrapunctatum) are rare in the upper part of the valley, but the most common of 8 species of lizard elsewhere in the valley.

Rhytida meesoni perampla snail, Leaf-veined slugs and many insects live in the valley, including the striped dung fly, Mycetophila fungus gnats, West Coast tree weta, Wellington tree weta, Kahurangi ground wētā, and Hakaharpalus and Kiwitrechus beetles. European wasps have become a problem in the beech forests since their spread in the 1970s, being known to kill and compete for food with lizards and other native species.

Bluegill bully, torrentfish, common bully and short-finned eels are in the river and streams. Salmon trout were introduced to the Buller in 1878 and trout in 1884.

Other introduced animals include stoats, red deer, goats, pigs and chamois. Rats were present when Europeans first explored the valley in 1846.

== Geology ==
Lake Rotoiti was created by a glacier and glacial moraines occupy a large area between the Buller and Gowan rivers. From the lake the Buller flows west through a gorge cut in granitic rocks of the Median Batholith. It then turns southwest to follow the axis of the Longford Syncline to Murchison. Tributary valleys around Murchison commonly follow north-south trending faults and fold axes.

The Buller's deep gorges have been cut through the mountains as they have been raised by Quaternary faulting and folding. Some 350,000 years ago the river had wide floodplains, which remain as flat terraces above the narrow gorge, as at Manuka Flat, now roughly 300 m (980 ft) above the river. The Murchison Basin was filled between the Late Eocene and Early Miocene by sediments in increasingly shallow waters, indicating that the uplift of the area to the north began in the Early Miocene. It was particularly rapid during the late Miocene-Pliocene.

In the 1929 Murchison earthquake a 1.6 km (0.99 mi) landslide fell 550 m (1,800 ft) to dam the Buller at Fern Flat, about midway between Murchison and O'Sullivan's Bridge. After two days the dam was washed away. The road between Murchison and Inangahua had 34 landslips, some up to 600 m (2,000 ft) wide. The road at White Creek, in the Upper Gorge, was split by a 4.5 m (15 ft) scarp. There were also slips in the 1968 Inangahua earthquake, one of which created a 30 m (98 ft) high dam in the river, just above Inangahua.

Above the Lower Gorge, podzol soils lie on sandstones of the Brunner Coal Measures. They are very infertile, acidic and tend to be very poorly drained. At high altitudes, the soils become skeletal and, in many places, unweathered rocks lie on the surface. Brunner Coal Measures are Eocene and were deposited in an estuary. There were coal mines near the Lower Gorge at Rahui (opened 1942) and Cascade (originally opened to improve mine drainage in 1897).

Gold is in quartz veins near Lyell, deposited by hydrothermal fluids, created by metamorphosis, about 420 million years ago.

Uranium was found in the Lower Gorge in 1955 and searches were made for viable deposits until the 1970s, but all were less than 0.1% U_{3}O_{8}. In 1972 the mountains on either side of the Gorge were officially named Mounts Cassin and Jacobsen, after the men who discovered the uranium.

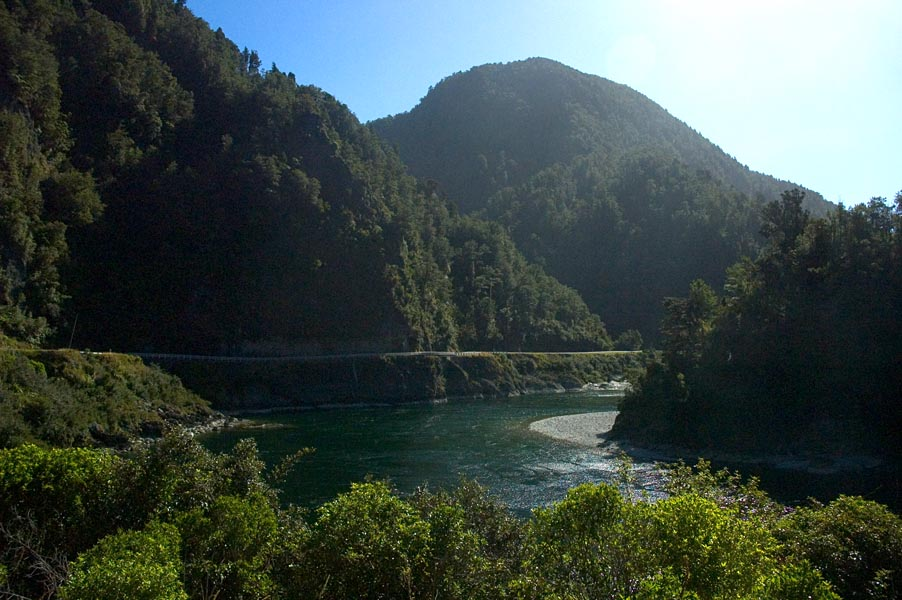
The Buller River

== Tributaries ==
The Buller has several major tributaries. These include (in order from Lake Rotoiti) the Gowan River, the Matakitaki River, the Maruia River, and the Inangahua River. Other smaller tributaries include the Hinemoatū / Howard, Hope, Owen, Mangles, Matiri, Newton, Orikaka, Blackwater, Ohikaiti and Ohikanui Rivers.

In July 2001 the Buller Water Conservation Order came into force, listing the waters of the Buller River and tributaries that are to be retained in their natural state or protected because of the outstanding characteristics, features and values of the waters.
