= Orikaka River =

Coordinates: 41°50′S 171°54′E

Location
- Country: New Zealand

Physical characteristics
- Source
  - location: Matiri Range
- Mouth
  - location: Buller River
- Length: 33 km (21 mi)

The Orikaka River (also known as the Mackley River) is a river of the West Coast Region of New Zealand's South Island. It flows southwest from the southern end of the Matiri Range before turning south to flow into the Buller River five kilometres to the west of Inangahua.

The river physically connects with the Ngākawau River.

== See also ==
- List of rivers of New Zealand
