= Old Ghost Road =

New Zealand cycling and tramping trail

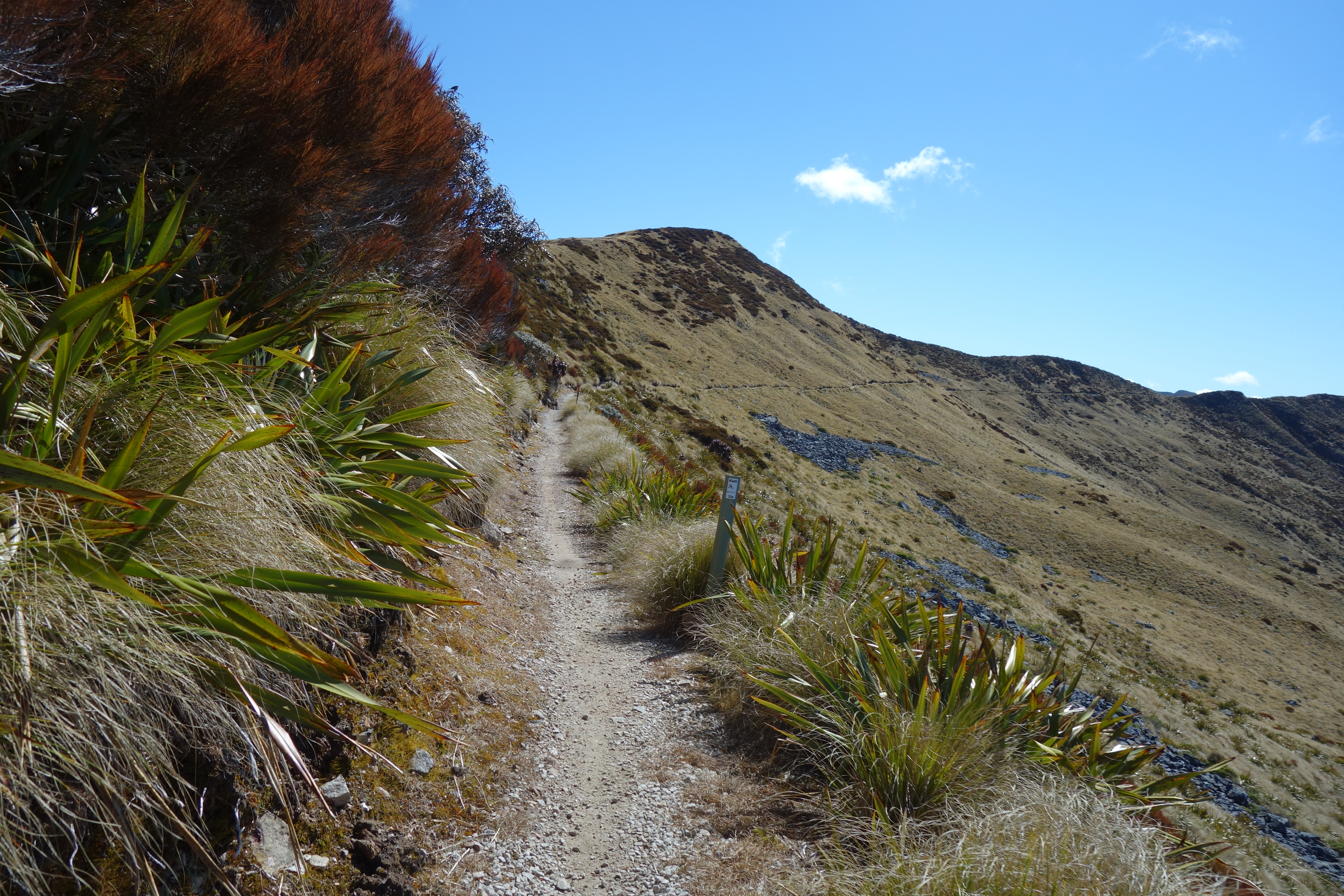
- Trail section between Bald Hill and Mt Montgomery
- Length: 85 km (53 mi)
- Location: Buller District, New Zealand
- Trailheads: Lyell / Seddonville
- Use: mountain biking tramping
- Highest point: 1,280 m (4,200 ft)
- Difficulty: Advanced
- Season: Year round
- Sights: Lyell Range; Several ghost towns New Zealand old-growth forest Mōkihinui River
- Hazards: Cliffs; Exposure to weather change
- Website: https://oldghostroad.org.nz/

The Old Ghost Road is a mountain bike and tramping trail part-funded as one of the projects of the New Zealand Cycle Trail (NZCT) system in the Buller District of New Zealand. Of all NZCT projects, it is the technically most difficult one to ride and is rated "advanced" (Grade 4 out of 5). The highest point of the trail is at 1,280 metres (4,200 ft).

== History ==
=== 19th century tracks ===
During the West Coast gold rush in the early 1860s, the town of Lyell on the Buller River was founded. A dray road was built at the time towards the Lyell Saddle to give access to several mines and gold towns. There was also a dray road that started south of Seddonville and went along the Mōkihinui River; the first land access to Karamea was via this route. In 1886, a survey was carried out to connect these two routes. Over time, knowledge of how much of the route had been built has been lost and the slips and landslides caused by the 1929 Murchison earthquake made those parts that had been built inaccessible. The 1968 Inangahua earthquake caused further damage.

=== Rough & Tumble lodge and the Mōkihinui dam ===
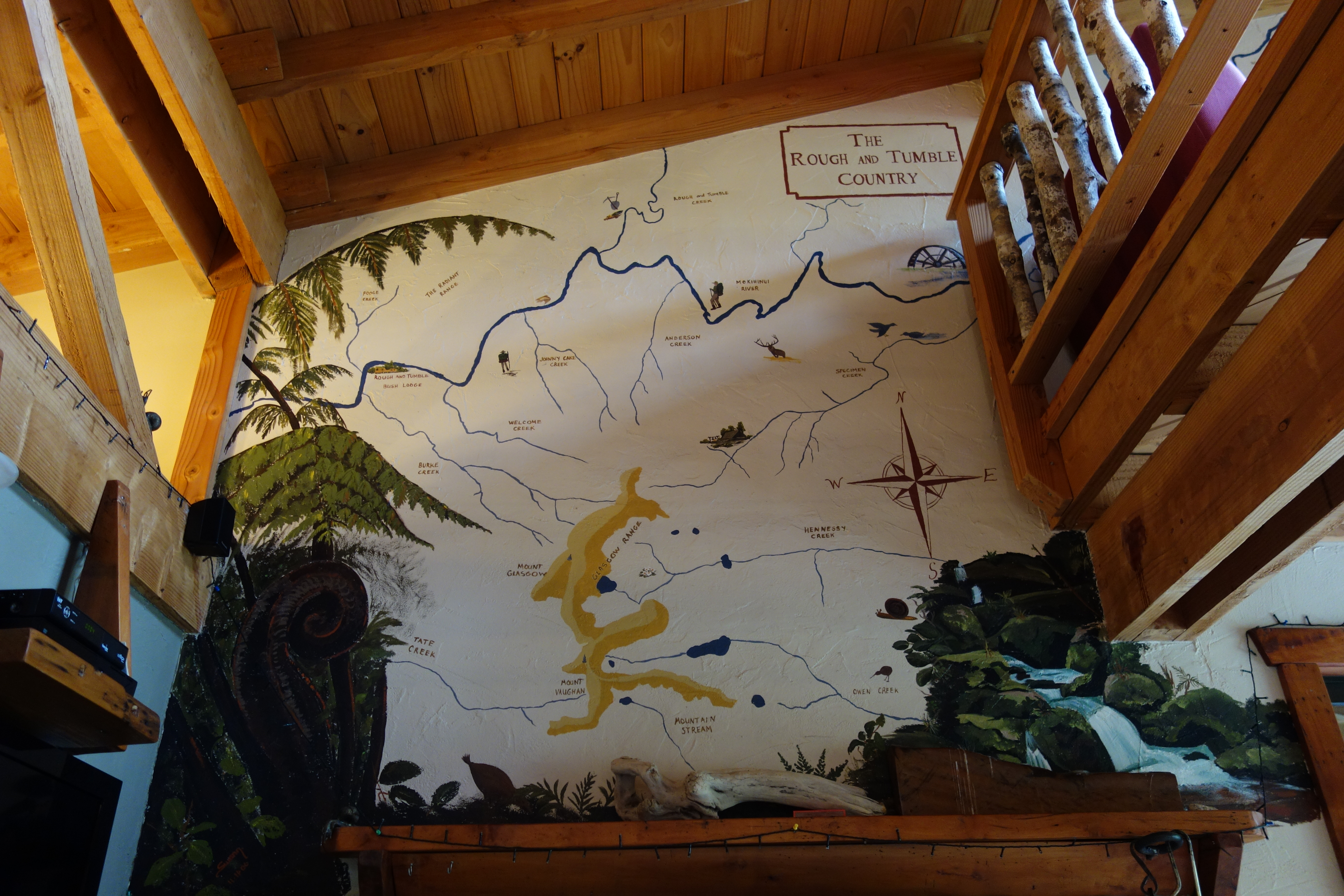
Mural of the Mōkihinui catchment at the Rough & Tumble lodge

In 2002, Marion Boatwright from North Carolina and his wife Susan Cook from Christchurch came across overgrown farmland at the end of the Mōkihinui Gorge that they thought suitable for a lodge. They purchased the land and built the lodge themselves; it opened in December 2006. A local artist was asked to paint a mural of the Mōkihinui above the lodge's fireplace. The artist's partner, Steve Stack, a local West Coaster with an intimate knowledge of the back-country, subsequently became friends with Boatwright.

Before the lodge opened, Boatwright and Cook learned that Meridian Energy was working on a proposal to dam the Mōkihinui River. Whilst the dam was to go immediately upstream of their property, their land was needed for three years for construction activity and they would have to move away during that time.

=== Track exploration ===
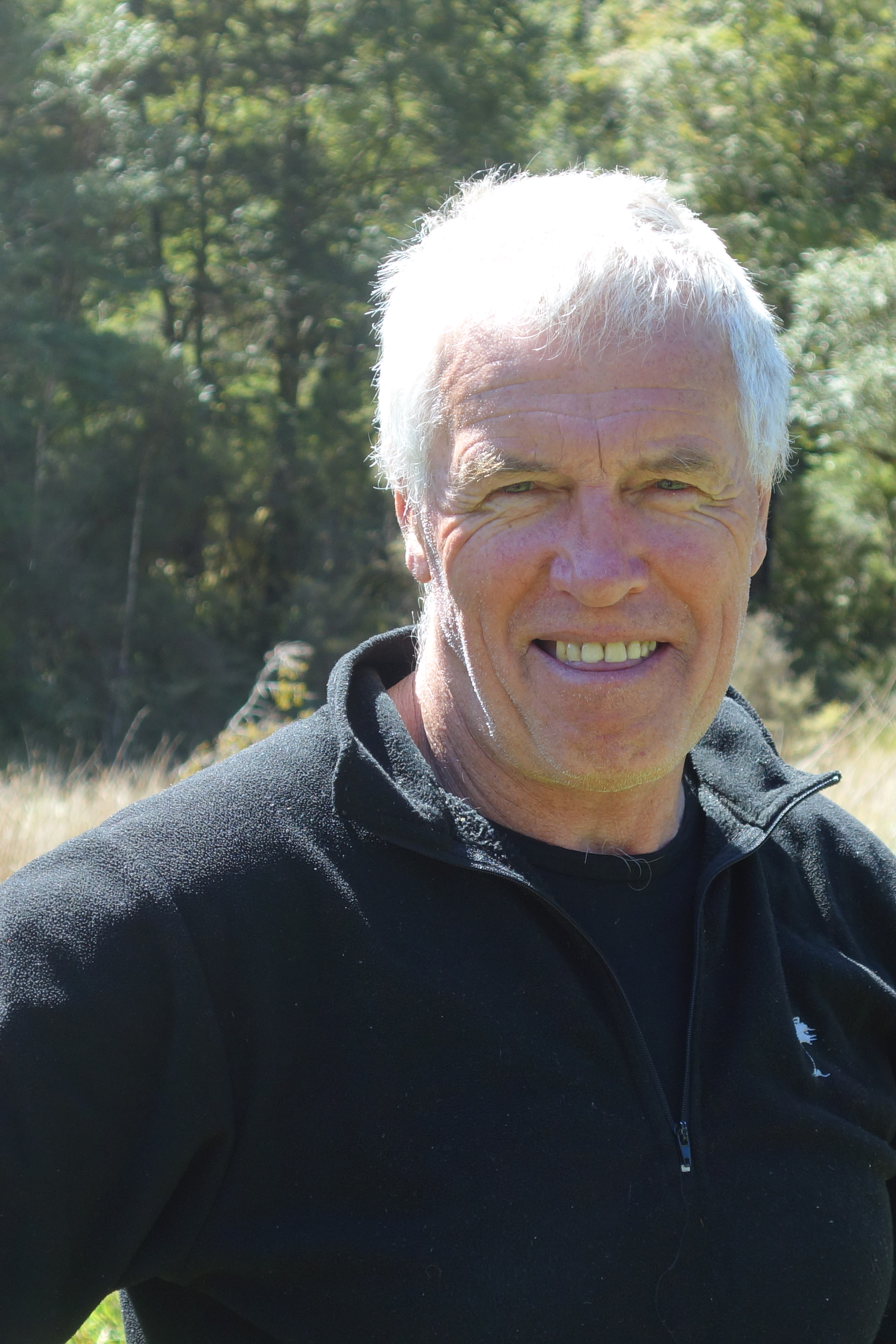
Steve Stack in 2018

Boatwright and his wife learned from the local Department of Conservation (DoC) manager, Bob Dickson, that a proposed tramping route along the Mōkihinui Gorge was part of a longer dray road that had never been completed. Shortly after in early 2007, Boatwright was handed the original of an 1886 survey plan for a "Lyell and Mokihinui Road"; the owner of the map had been told that the Rough & Tumble lodge is an appropriate place for preserving local historic artefacts. The map showed the proposed alignment that Dickson had mentioned; it followed the Mōkihinui River, then its south branch before climbing over the Lyell Range to stay above Lyell Creek to the site of Lyell township. In July 2007, Boatwright and Stack set out to tramp the route from Lyell to the Rough & Tumble lodge. Their objectives were to find out how much of the road had been built, how accessible it was, and whether it offered an attractive environment for tramping. They found that the track from Lyell stopped at Lyell Saddle and that nothing had ever been built along the south branch of the Mōkihinui. The area downstream from Mountain Creek was known to Stack and the track started again several kilometres downstream from Mōkihinui Forks. Their six-day tramp confirmed that over half of the surveyed road had never been built. And most of the part that had been built along the Mōkihinui River was threatened to be flooded by the Meridian Energy dam proposal.

=== Mokihinui-Lyell Backcountry Trust ===
Boatwright set about to form a working group to progress the idea of a long-distance track. The environmental manager for the Solid Energy's Stockton coal mine, Phil Rossiter, joined first. Rossiter was a keen mountain biker and played rugby, and his employer was looking for opportunities to "give back to the community". The next to join was Wayne Pratt who had been intimately involved in creating the Hump Ridge Track; Pratt had recently purchased Helicharter Karamea and could provide helicopter access. When Dickson, the DoC manager, supported that a track be investigated, the group formed the Mokihinui-Lyell Backcountry Trust (MLBT) and had it incorporated in July 2008. Meridian Energy paid for the establishment costs and agreed in consultation with the group that should their dam proposal go ahead, they would establish a track above the new water level as a compensation measure.

The trust embarked on getting a cost estimate and with financial help from Meridian Energy, a DoC field work specialist—Mal Hansen—was flown into the south branch. Hansen, Stack and Boatwright explored the surveyed route from where Slate Creek flowed into the Mōkihinui to Lyell Saddle and concluded that the route would have been difficult in the 1880s but had become untenable through the two 20th-century earthquakes. They then explored in a downstream direction and stopped counting at 35 required bridges and flew out from Silver Creek, less than 4 kilometres (2.5 mi) downstream (as the crow flies) from the confluence with Slate Creek. Based on this incomplete survey, a DoC staff member estimated the trail costs at NZ$7.3m. The trust then engaged an outdoor recreation specialist—Kay Booth—with forecasting potential user numbers, and an economist—Geoff Butcher—with estimating the economic benefits for the local community. Booth was optimistic about the project but Butcher was sceptical.

=== Lyell track ===
Towards the end of 2008, the trust made the decision to drop any further exploration work along the Mōkihinui River due to the uncertainty caused by Meridian Energy's dam proposal, but also because the trust had fallen out of favour with some groups due to its close working relationship with Meridian Energy. Instead, they proposed to DoC's Dickson that they concentrate on clearing the existing dray road from Lyell up to the first slip. Dickson suggested that they clear a helicopter landing area at the saddle for safer access from above but also large enough for a hut to be built there. Prior to this, the helicopter could only set down one skid at a rock outcrop, with members having to leave the craft "commando-style". 18 January 2009 saw the clearing of an area at the Lyell Saddle; this was the start of construction for the Old Ghost Road. After a few weekends of volunteers chainsawing fallen trees, the route became walkable. By winter 2009, Dickson proposed to hire two diggers to remove slips from the track. When the digger operators had been recruited the project suffered a significant setback, with a once-in-75-year rainstorm event having swept thousands of trees and many tons of debris onto the track. Over a five-week period, the track was restored. With the constant gradient of the track restored and having become obvious again, Rossiter proposed to the trust a change of scope from a tramping route to a mountain biking track; this was accepted.

This left the challenge on the Lyell track to overcome – two large slips that left near-vertical rock faces behind. Rossiter, a geologist by training, explained that the crumbly nature of this particular rock would respond best to chipping and prising away rather than explosives. A camp-site was built on the track that could sleep 14 volunteers and over several weekends, the crew hand-benched a track across the slips.

=== New Zealand Cycle Trail funding ===
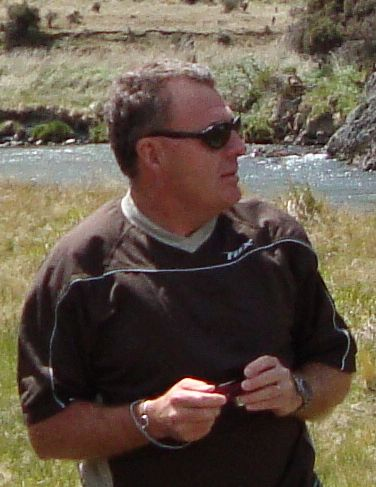
John Dunn, project manager for the New Zealand Cycle Trail

In late 2009, the trust heard that the New Zealand Cycle Trail (NZCT) project had $50m funding available for projects. Dickson cautioned that, based on what DoC knew about the project, the trust would have a "snowball's chance in hell" to receive any grants. Undeterred, Boatwright went to a workshop help by the NZCT team in Christchurch and he was the odd one out. Of the circa 30 attendees, all others were representing district or city councils developing projects to suit the available funding. Boatwright represented the only group of volunteers and they were the only ones already working on an actual project. In the first instance, NZCT wanted applicants to tell the story of their project, how much money they requested, and where the necessary co-funding would come from. Boatwright wrote the application and the trustees settled on asking for $2m. John Dunn, the NZCT project manager, informed Boatwright that of the 18 proposals that had been accepted, the Old Ghost Road was the top ranked one.

The next step was to produce a feasibility study and Stack was sent along the south branch to find a track alignment that would be viable and feasible. The plan was to meet the other trustees at the Lyell Saddle helipad a week later and when he emerged, his face said it all: the south branch of the Mōkihinui River could not fulfil the dream. Pratt, the helicopter pilot, spontaneously invited the others to a flight along the Lyell Range; he had often wondered whether one could go along the tops rather than following the river. And on that flight, the eventual route would be agreed on – from the Lyell Saddle to Goat Creek Hut where the track would rejoin the Mōkihinui River's south branch. It looked perfect, but the challenges of building it would nearly break the trustees in years to come. A week later, Stack and Boatwright walked south from Goat Creek Hut to meet Rossiter and a geologist—Brian Adams—who set out from Bald Hill above the Lyell Saddle to meet in the middle. The route looked feasible and when Dickson and his superior did a flyover, support from DoC was also given. Everybody agreed that the new route was a game changer, with the challenge of building the route through an alpine environment being intense. The resulting feasibility study produced by Adams was accepted by the NZCT. The third hurdle was to have agreed co-funding in place and in May 2010, all partners committed to their share.

Development West Coast (DWC), a charitable trust set up by the government in 2001 with a fund of $92 million for the West Coast to stop native logging, would commit their funding. Solid Energy would fund the back-country huts. The Department of Conservation took on the ongoing maintenance of the Lyell-part of the track. Buller District Council took on maintenance support for the alpine sections and the track along the south branch. In addition, the New Zealand Cycle Trail team accepted that the Mōkihinui Gorge section would be left unresolved until the Meridian Energy proposal for a dam had been resolved. Subsequently, Rossiter's wife Di took on the task of applying for grants and secured funding for 15 of the 17 bridges that had to be built.

=== Bald Hill ===
The trustees agreed to split tasks: Rossiter would deal with administrative work, negotiate with partners, and write the DoC environmental impact report. Stack would become a paid full-time employee of the trust and lead the crew of track workers. Boatwright would be in charge of the team that built huts that could give track workers accommodation. In addition, the chairmanship of the trust moved from Boatwright to Rossiter as the initial chair was to permanently relocate back to North Carolina. Boatwright would come back to the West Coast for a few weeks at a time whenever a hut needed to be built.

Stack led a crew to build and restore the remaining Lyell track above the slips. Boatwright, on a stint back from the United States during March and April 2011, led the building of the Lyell Saddle Hut. The hut was only just ready when the crew finished the track from below. With the new base established, Stack and his crew tackled the six kilometres of track up Bald Hill. The geology changed from greywacke to mudstone at the Lyell Saddle and construction became difficult as the weight of the digger would turn the mudstone into mud, making track building impossible. The solution was to employ the corduroy road construction method with beech trees chainsawed lengthwise to produce the needed logs. One team member was assigned to chainsawing and after a while, he managed to produce enough material for 15 metres (49 ft) of track per day. It was a hard slog and Stack's team spent over a year building the track up to the tops.

=== Further huts ===
Later in 2011, Boatwright built the Stern Valley Hut with the help of his brother and a builder friend. In January 2012, Boatwright built Ghost Lake Hut with two friends over 19 days. The hut sits at just over 1,200 metres (3,900 ft) elevation on top of a 100 metres (330 ft) vertical cliff. On 22 May 2012, Meridian Energy announced that they had cancelled the Mokihinui Hydro proposal. The trust responded by moving crews from the high country into the Mōkihinui Gorge and Boatwright mobilised himself and three friends to build Specimen Point Hut as a winter base for the track builders.

=== Addition to Kahurangi National Park ===
The Mōkihinui River river catchment area is a largely unmodified landscape of open tussock, podocarp-beech forests, and the pristine river itself. The area was highly rated for its biodiversity values, but prior to 2019, it was classified as stewardship land − the lowest level of protection for publicly-owned conservation land. Following the cancellation of the Mokihinui Hydro project, work began to add the catchment area to the adjacent Kahurangi National Park. In 2019, 64,400 ha (159,000 acres) of land in the Mōkihinui River catchment, including 15 km (9.3 mi) of river bed, were added to the national park. The addition increased the size of the park by 14%. The area added to the park includes a large portion of the route of the Old Ghost Road.

== Etymology ==
In late 2007, Boatwright thought about a name for the track and notioned the Lyell and Mokihinui Road as a ghost of a road; from this came the idea of "Ghost Road". Discussing the potential name with other trust members, Richard Little suggested that it be preceded by the word 'old' to become the "Old Ghost Road".
