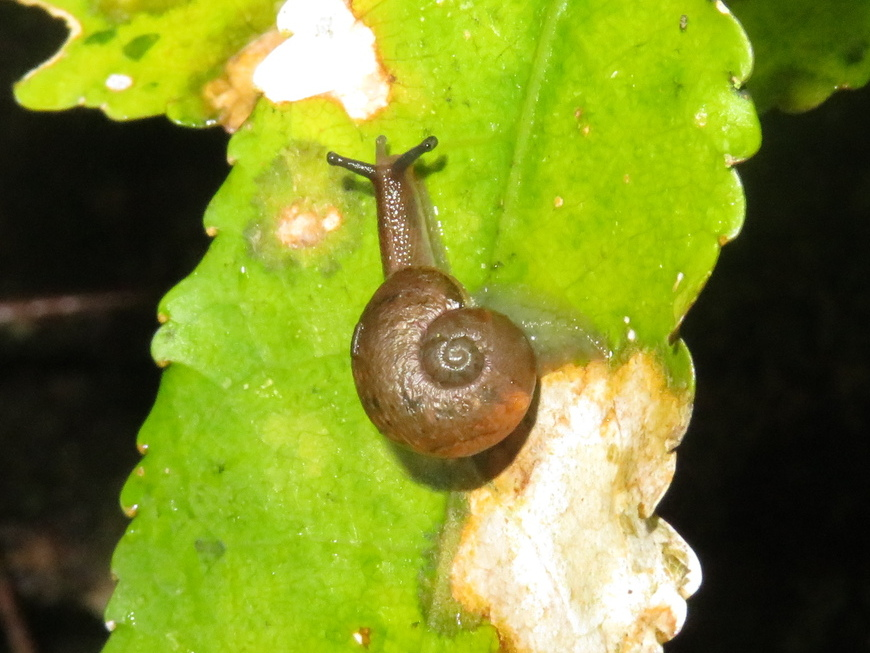
- Rhytida meesoni spp. perampla

Scientific classification
- Kingdom: Animalia
- Phylum: Mollusca
- Class: Gastropoda
- Order: Stylommatophora
- Family: Rhytididae
- Genus: Rhytida
- Species: R. meesoni

Binomial name
- Rhytida meesoni Suter, 1891

= Rhytida meesoni =

Species of gastropod

Rhytida meesoni is a species of small, air-breathing land snail, a terrestrial pulmonate gastropod mollusc in the family Rhytididae.

== Subspecies ==
- Rhytida meesoni meesoni Suter, 1891 South Island
- Rhytida meesoni perampla Powell, 1946 South Island

== Distribution ==
This species occurs in New Zealand

== Life cycle ==
Dimensions of a group of eggs of Rhytida meesoni were 2.75 × 2.5, 2.75 × 2.25, 2.5 × 2.25, 2.5 × 2, 2.25 × 2 mm.
