= Orowaiti River =

Coordinates: 41°45′S 171°38′E

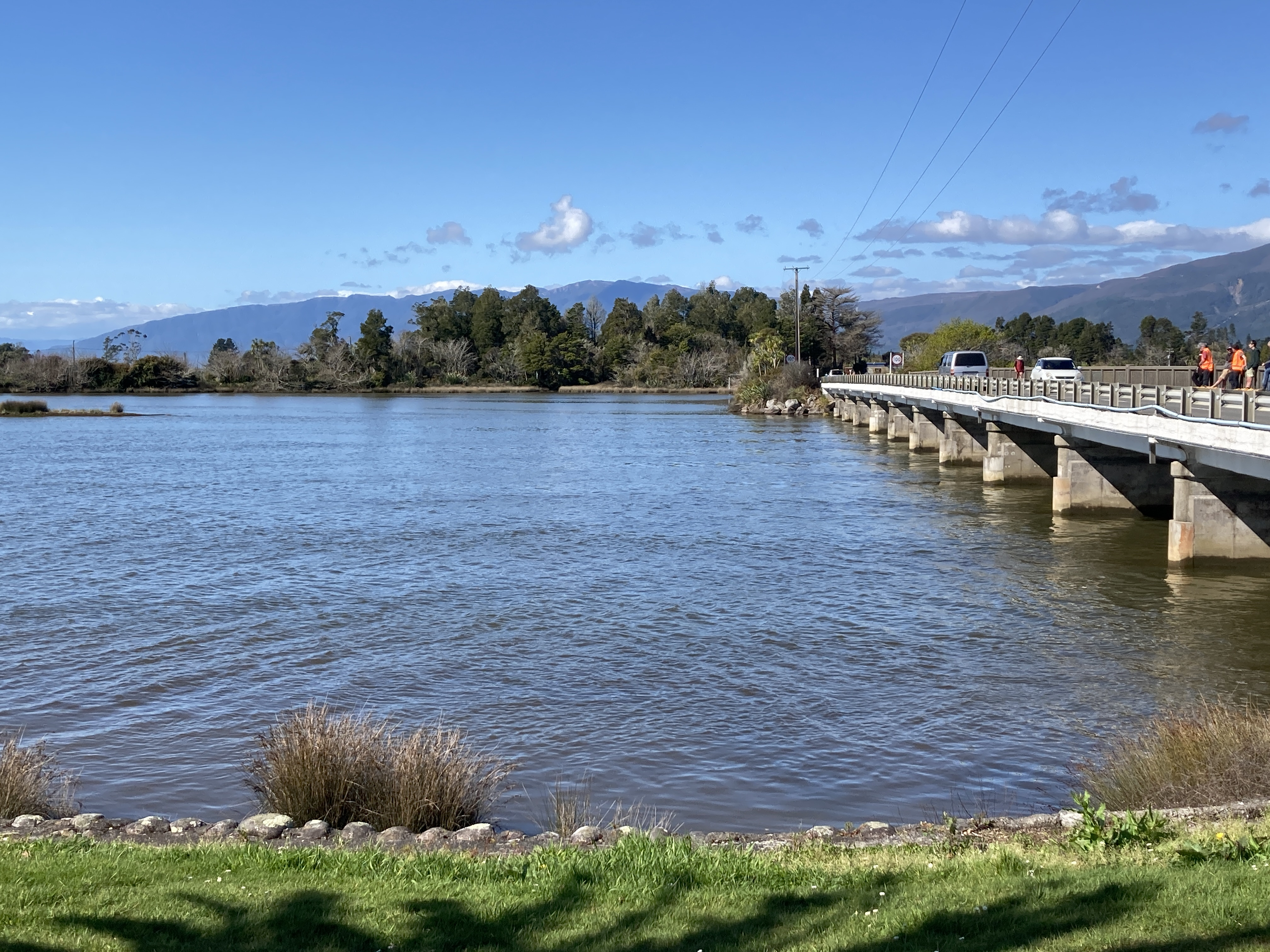

Location
- Country: New Zealand

Physical characteristics
- Mouth
  - location: Karamea Bight
- Length: 15 km (9.3 mi)

The Orowaiti River is a river of the West Coast Region of New Zealand's South Island. The smaller of the two rivers which run through the town of Westport, it reaches the Karamea Bight three kilometres to the east of its larger neighbour, the Buller River.

There is an overflow channel into the Orowaiti River coming from the Buller River when it is in flood. During high rainfall events, the two rivers can both reach high levels, effectively cutting off Westport and putting the town at risk of flooding. Both rivers burst their banks during a storm in July 2021, leading to damage of 500 homes.

== See also ==
- List of rivers of New Zealand
