= Hinemoatū / Howard River =

River in New Zealand

Coordinates: 41.719632°S 172.681818°E

Location
- Country: New Zealand

Physical characteristics
- Source
  - location: Travers Range
  - elevation: 570 m (1,870 ft)
- Mouth
  - location: Buller River
  - elevation: 420 m (1,380 ft)
- Length: 20 km (12 mi)

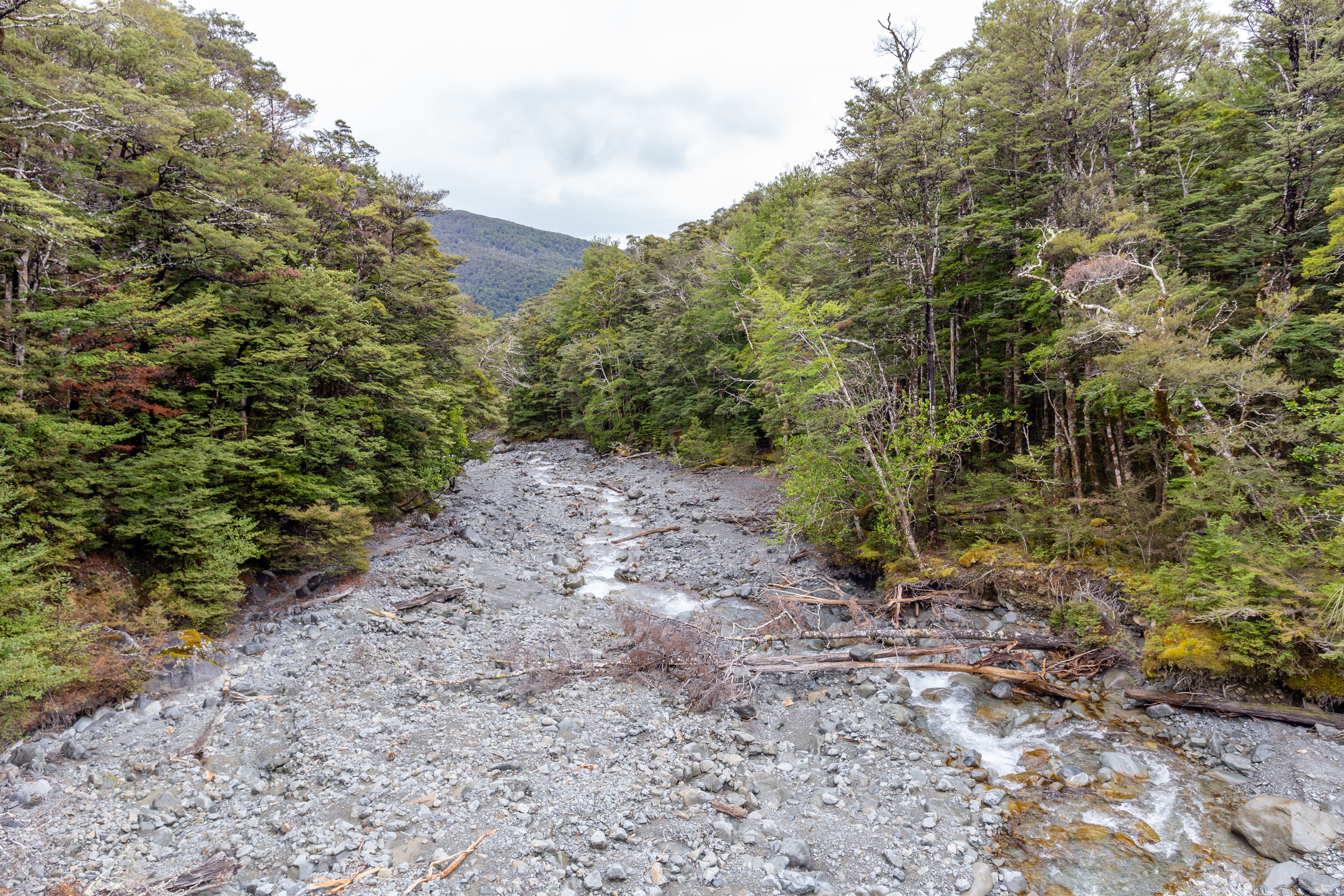
Hodgson Stream, one of the Hinemoatū/Howard tributaries

The Hinemoatū / Howard River is a river of the northern South Island of New Zealand. A tributary of the Buller River, the Hinemoatū/Howard starts at the confluence of the Hodgson and Tier Streams in the Travers Range of Nelson Lakes National Park, flowing north between Lakes Rotoroa and Rotoiti, before reaching the Buller between Kawatiri and Saint Arnaud. Close to its confluence with the Buller, the river is bridged by State Highway 63 and further up by Howard Valley Road.

Formerly known as the Howard River, the river's name was officially altered to Hinemoatū / Howard River in August 2014. Charles Heaphy named the river after James Howard, one the New Zealand Company staff, who died in the Wairau Affray.

4 ha (9.9 acres) of the river near the Buller is a Scientific Reserve for Black-billed Gulls (tarāpuka) and Black-fronted Terns (tarapiroe). Forest in the valley is dominated by red beech (tawhai raunui), with some silver beech (tahina), several varieties of filmy ferns, including narrow filmy-fern, several coprosmas, including red-currant coprosma, and weeping māpou.

Gold was discovered in 1863 and again in 1915. At one stage about 150 miners were working the Louis Creek. Interest was revived by the Unemployment Board's Gold Prospecting Subsidy Scheme, which was extended to include the valley in 1933, and a 1933 miner's cottage remains which was occupied until at least the 1940s.

The Speargrass Track from St Arnaud crosses the upper part of the catchment.

== See also ==
- List of rivers of New Zealand
