= Hope River (Tasman) =

River in the Tasman District, New Zealand

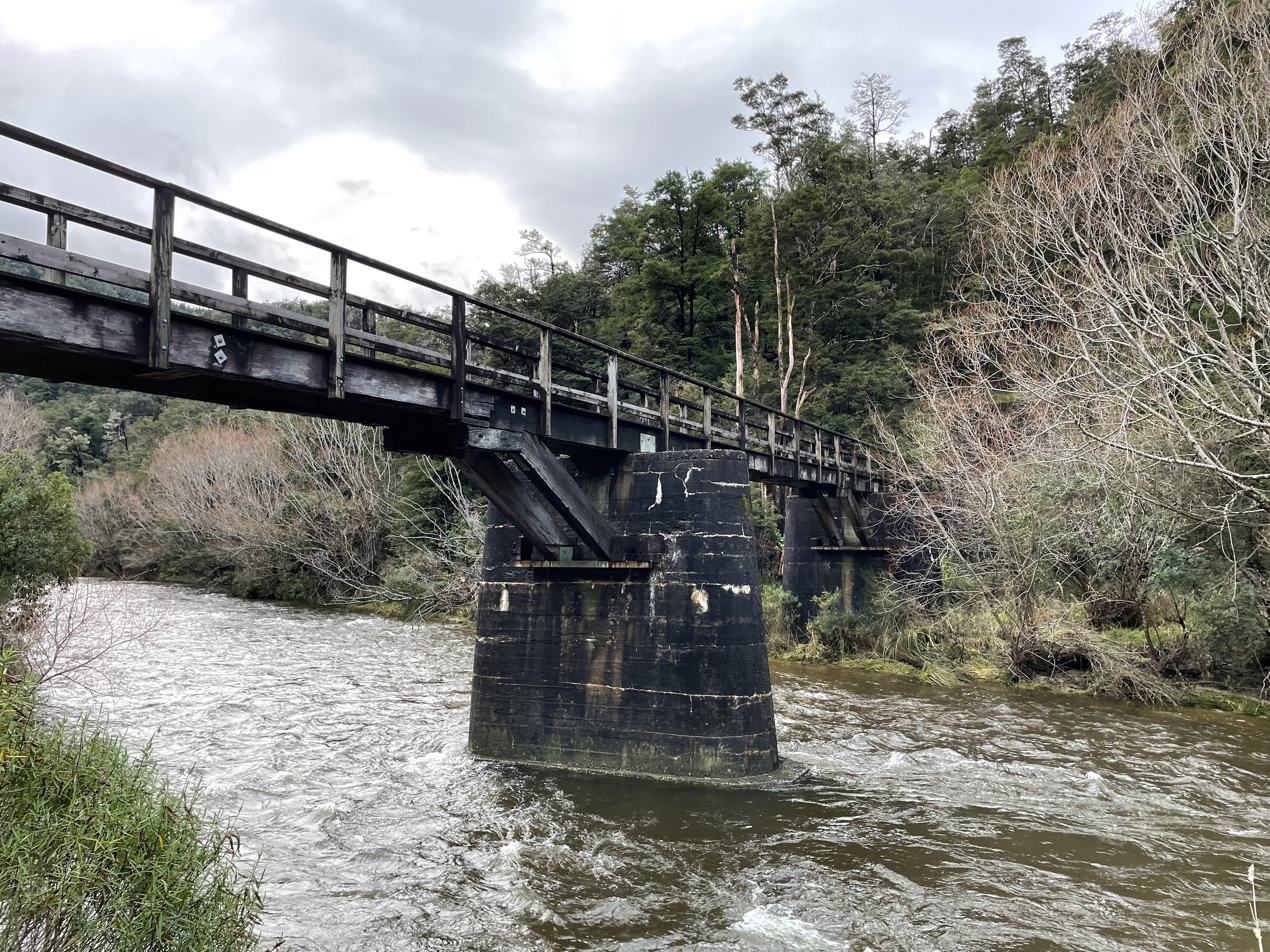
- A former railway bridge over the Hope River near Kawatiri, now adapted for use as part of a short walking track.
- Route of the Hope River
- Mouth of the Hope River Hope River (Tasman) (South Island)

Location
- Country: New Zealand

Physical characteristics
- Source: Hope Range
  - coordinates: 41.5795°S 172.6046°E
- Mouth
  - location: Buller River
  - coordinates: 41°41′47″S 172°36′46″E
  - elevation: 350 m (1,150 ft)

Basin features
- Progression: Hope River → Buller River → Karamea Bight → Tasman Sea
- Tributaries
  - left: Little Hope River, Cow Creek

The Hope River is in the Tasman District of the South Island of New Zealand. It is the northernmost of three Hope Rivers in the South Island.

The river rises on the eastern slopes of the Hope Range at heights of around 1,200 metres (3,900 ft). It flows east then south before joining the Buller River near Kawatiri Railway Station. A tributary called the Little Hope River rises near the Hope Saddle and flows southwest, joining the Hope River at Glenhope. State Highway 6 follows the valley of the Hope and then the Little Hope as it climbs towards the Hope Saddle en route to Nelson.

The river was named after G.W. Hope, who was secretary to Edward, Lord Stanley, the 14th Earl of Derby who later became Prime Minister of the United Kingdom.
