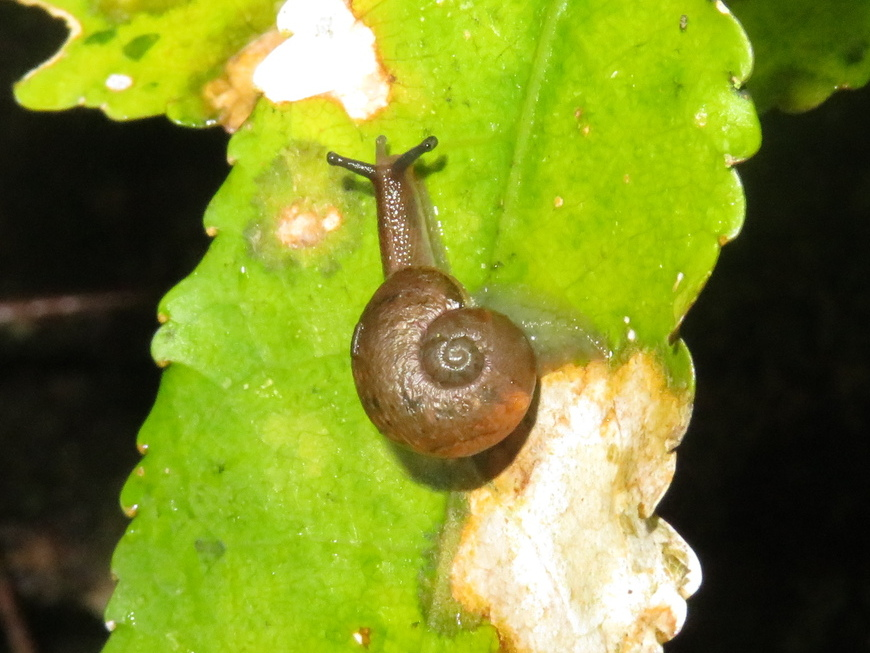

Scientific classification
- Kingdom: Animalia
- Phylum: Mollusca
- Class: Gastropoda
- Order: Stylommatophora
- Family: Rhytididae
- Genus: Rhytida
- Species: R. meesoni
- Subspecies: R. m. perampla

Trinomial name
- Rhytida meesoni perampla Powell, 1946

= Rhytida meesoni perampla =

Subspecies of gastropod

Rhytida meesoni perampla is a subspecies of small, air-breathing land snail, a terrestrial pulmonate gastropod mollusc in the family Rhytididae.
