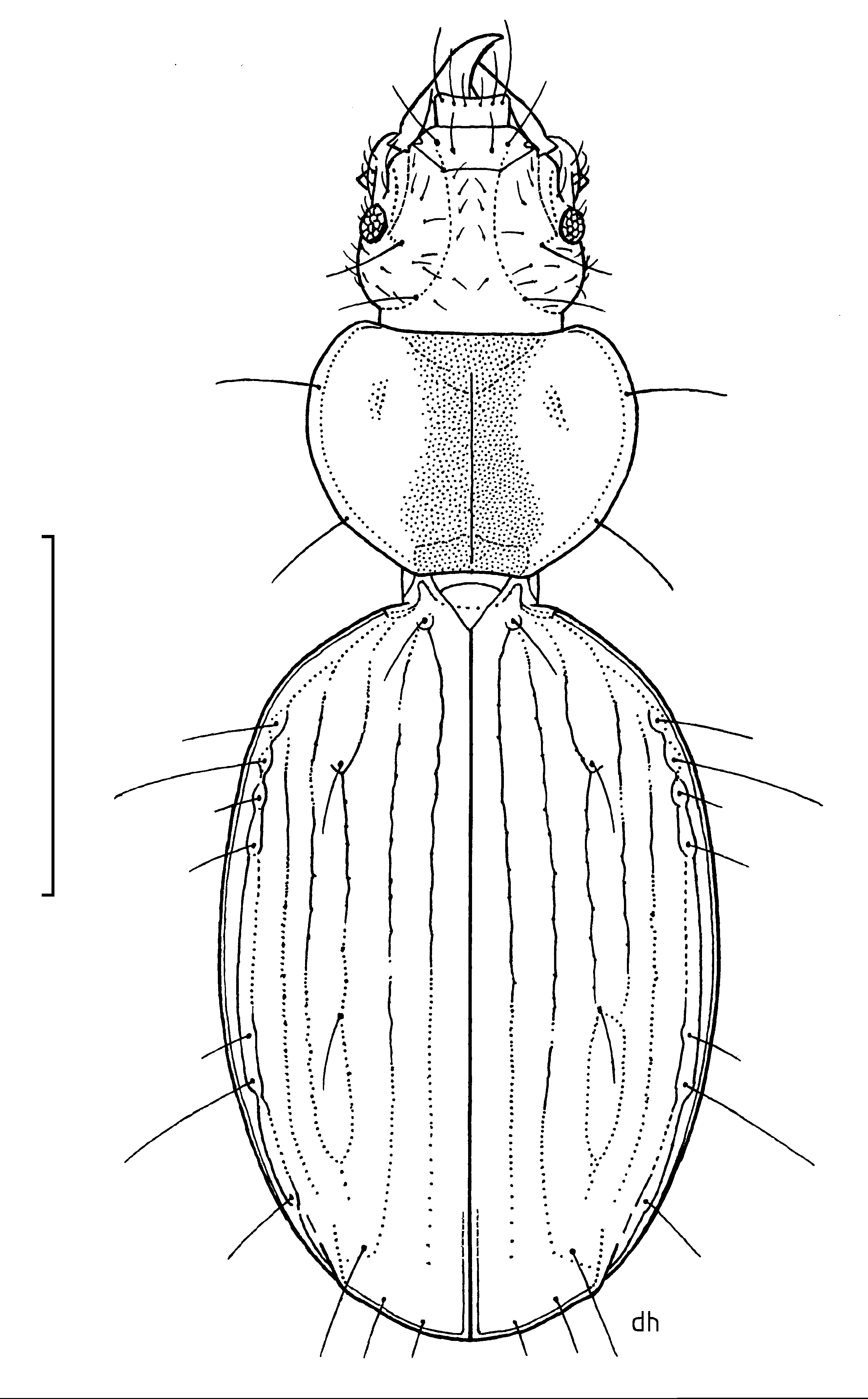
- Kiwitrechus karenscottae illustrated by Des Helmore

Scientific classification
- Kingdom: Animalia
- Phylum: Arthropoda
- Class: Insecta
- Order: Coleoptera
- Suborder: Adephaga
- Family: Carabidae
- Tribe: Trechini
- Subtribe: Aepina
- Genus: Kiwitrechus; Larochelle & Larivière, 2007
- Species: K. karenscottae

Binomial name
- Kiwitrechus karenscottae Larochelle & Larivière, 2007

= Kiwitrechus =

Genus of beetles

Kiwitrechus is a genus in the ground beetle family Carabidae. This genus has a single species, Kiwitrechus karenscottae. It is found in New Zealand.
