= Tiraumea River (Tasman) =

Location
- Country: New Zealand

Physical characteristics
- Source
  - elevation: 960 metres (3,150 ft)
- Mouth
  - location: Tutaki River
  - coordinates: 41°50′03″S 172°28′14″E
  - elevation: 275 metres (902 ft)
- Length: 16 km (9.9 mi)

The Tiraumea River is a river of the Tasman Region of New Zealand's South Island. The river has its source on the slopes of Mount Hutton (1,400 metres (4,600 ft)) at the southern end of the Braeburn Range, and runs northwest from the Tiraumea Saddle (672 metres (2,205 ft)). It reaches the Tutaki River 10 kilometres southeast of Murchison. The area is known for hunting.

The Tiraumea Track runs the full length of the river, descending from the Tiraumea Saddle to Lake Rotoroa. A Department of Conservation back-country hut is located beside the river.
