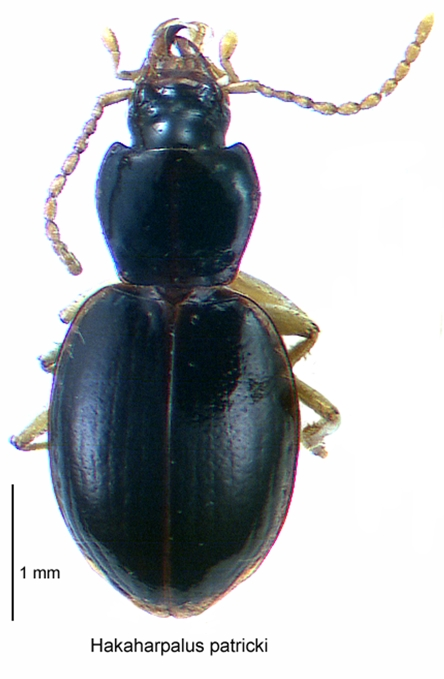
- Hakaharpalus patricki

Scientific classification
- Kingdom: Animalia
- Phylum: Arthropoda
- Class: Insecta
- Order: Coleoptera
- Suborder: Adephaga
- Family: Carabidae
- Subfamily: Harpalinae
- Genus: Hakaharpalus; Larochelle & Lariviere, 2005

= Hakaharpalus =

Genus of beetles

Hakaharpalus is a genus of beetles in the family Carabidae, containing the following species:

- Hakaharpalus cavelli (Broun, 1893)
- Hakaharpalus davidsoni Larochelle & Lariviere, 2005
- Hakaharpalus maddisoni Larochelle & Lariviere, 2005
- Hakaharpalus patricki Larochelle & Lariviere, 2005
- Hakaharpalus rhodeae Larochelle & Lariviere, 2005
