= Deepdale River =

River in Tasman District, New Zealand

Coordinates: 41°46′34″S 172°08′42″E

Location
- Country: New Zealand

Physical characteristics
- Source
  - location: Brunner Range
  - elevation: 1,130 m (3,710 ft)
- Mouth
  - location: Buller River
  - elevation: 97 m (318 ft)
- Length: 28 km (17 mi)

The Deepdale River is a river of New Zealand located in the Tasman Region of the South Island.

The Deepdale flows generally north from its source in the Brunner Range north of Mount Pelion, within Victoria Forest Park, forming a deep valley. It reaches the Buller River at the upper Buller Gorge, 20 kilometres (12 mi) west of Murchison.

== See also ==
- List of rivers of New Zealand
