= Newton River (Fiordland) =

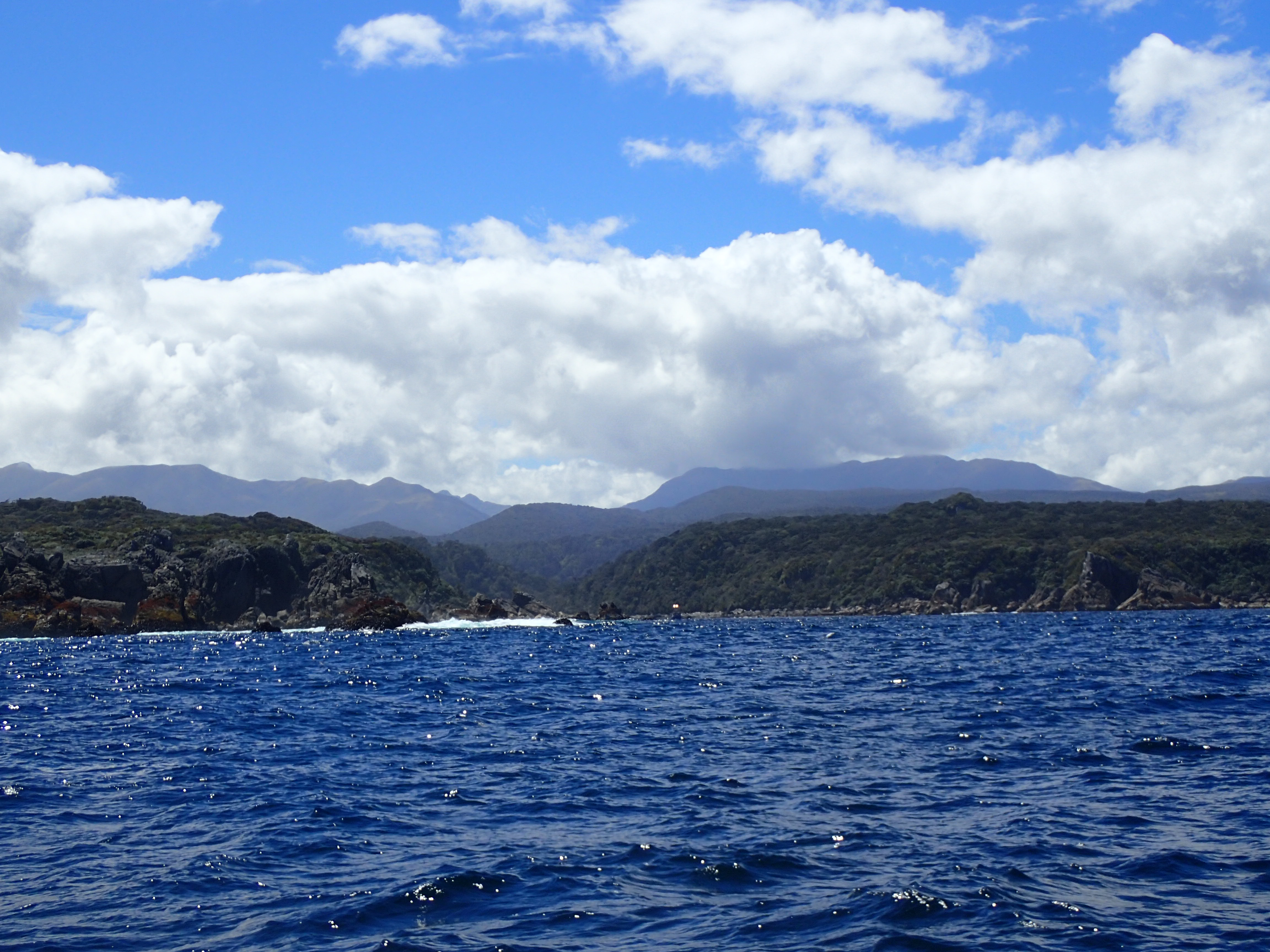
- West Cape & Newton River Mouth
- Route of the Newton River
- Mouth of the Newton River Newton River (Fiordland) (South Island)
- Native name: Waipōuri

Location
- Country: New Zealand

Physical characteristics
- Source: Lake Fraser
  - coordinates: 45°53′13″S 166°29′57″E
  - elevation: 31 m (102 ft)
- Mouth
  - location: Tasman Sea
  - coordinates: 45°54′30″S 166°26′01″E
  - elevation: 0 m (0 ft)
- Length: 9 km (5.6 mi)

Basin features
- Progression: Newton River → Tasman Sea

The Newton River is a river in Fiordland, New Zealand. It drains Lake Fraser south-westward into the Tasman Sea just south of West Cape.

Newton River is an official name, gazetted on 4 February 1960, after being in use by local fishermen for some time. It is about 9 km (5.6 mi) long.

The river flows over the Newton River pluton of Carbonferous biotite, granodiorite and granite, which has been glaciated and also forms a rock arch to the south of the river mouth, where a marine terrace has been uplifted within the last half a million years.

The beech forest in the valley includes black beech (tawairauriki), kāmahi, and silver beech (tawhai).

== See also ==
- List of rivers of New Zealand
