= Lyell, New Zealand =

Lyell
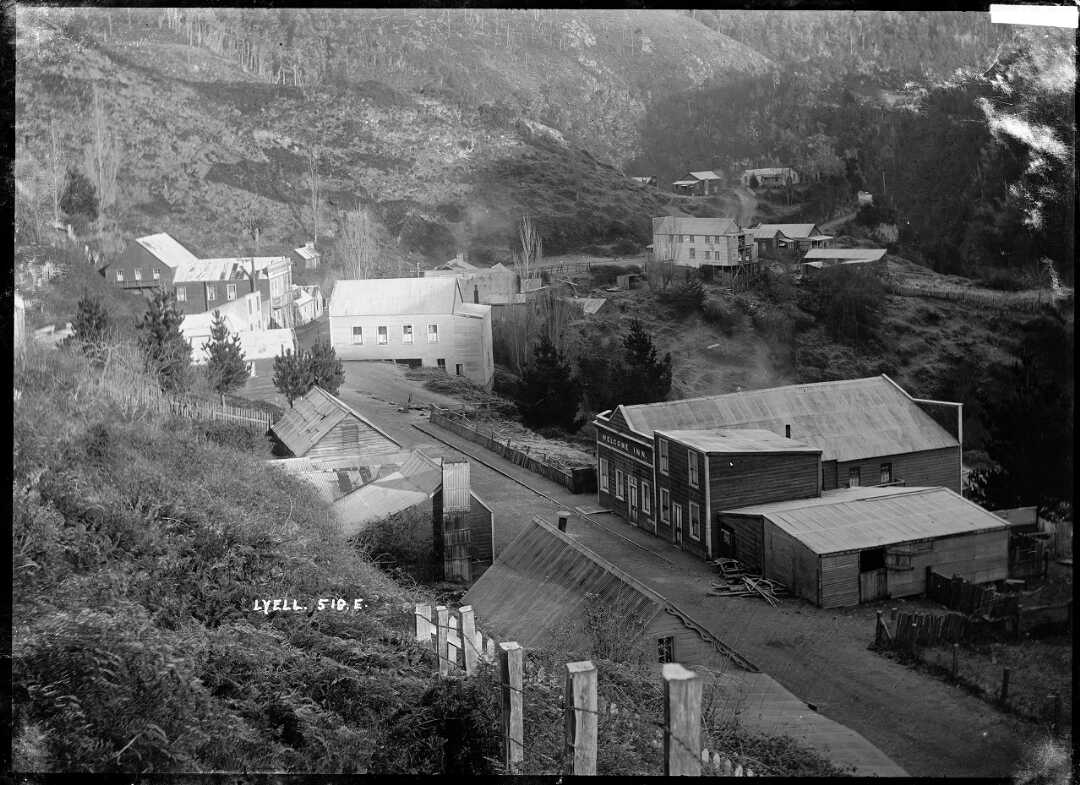
- Lyell in circa 1910

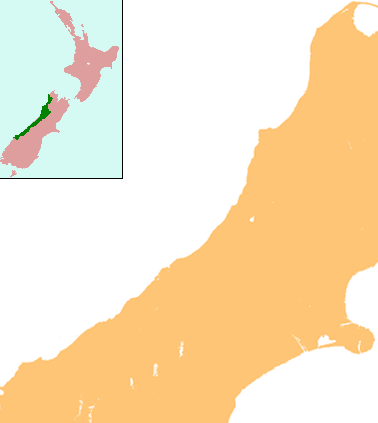
- Location within West Coast
- Coordinates: 41°47′49″S 172°2′54″E
- Country: New Zealand
- Region: West Coast
- District: Buller District
- Electorates: West Coast-Tasman; Te Tai Tonga

Population (2006)
  - Total: 0

Lyell is the site of a historic gold mining town in the Buller Gorge in the South Island of New Zealand. It lies on State Highway 6, 18 km (11 mi) northeast of Inangahua.

Lyell was named by the geologist Julius von Haast after the British geologist Charles Lyell, a friend of Sir George Grey, whose writings had influenced Charles Darwin.

The gold rush in Lyell began in 1862 when Māori prospectors found gold in Lyell Creek, a tributary of the Buller River. In 1869 two Italian miners, Antonio Zala and Giorgio Zanetti, discovered gold in quartz veins in the Lyell Creek area. The mine in this quartz reef was worked from 1872 until 1912. Gold in quartz reefs was successfully mined in only two places on the West Coast: Lyell and Reefton.

The settlement grew quickly with a population of about 100 in 1863, despite the area being inaccessible, difficult to work and prone to flooding. In the 1870s Lyell had a main street, Cliff St, with banks, newspaper offices and hotels. The population grew to more than 2000 in the late 1880s. By 1901 the population was 90 with 40 children at the school and in 1905 the Alpine Extended Gold Mining Co Ltd still employed 60 people.

Local newspapers were published during the height of settlement: the Lyell Argus and Matakitaki Advertiser from 1873 to 1882 and the Lyell Times and Central Buller Gazette from 1881 to 1898. The newspaper office and other buildings in Cliff St were destroyed by a fire in 1896.

One of the miners who worked at Lyell in the 1880s and 1890s was the Irish woman Bridget Goodwin, known as Biddy. The Italian miners later turned to dairy farming in the Lyell area.

A small settlement at Lyell continued until the 1960s. The ghost town is now a campsite maintained by the Department of Conservation. None of the original buildings remain but a track from the campsite leads to a cemetery and an old stamping battery. A dray road that was built at the time of the gold working towards the Lyell Saddle is now the start of the Old Ghost Road, a mountain biking and walking trail, 85 km (53 mi) in length, that finishes at Seddonville.

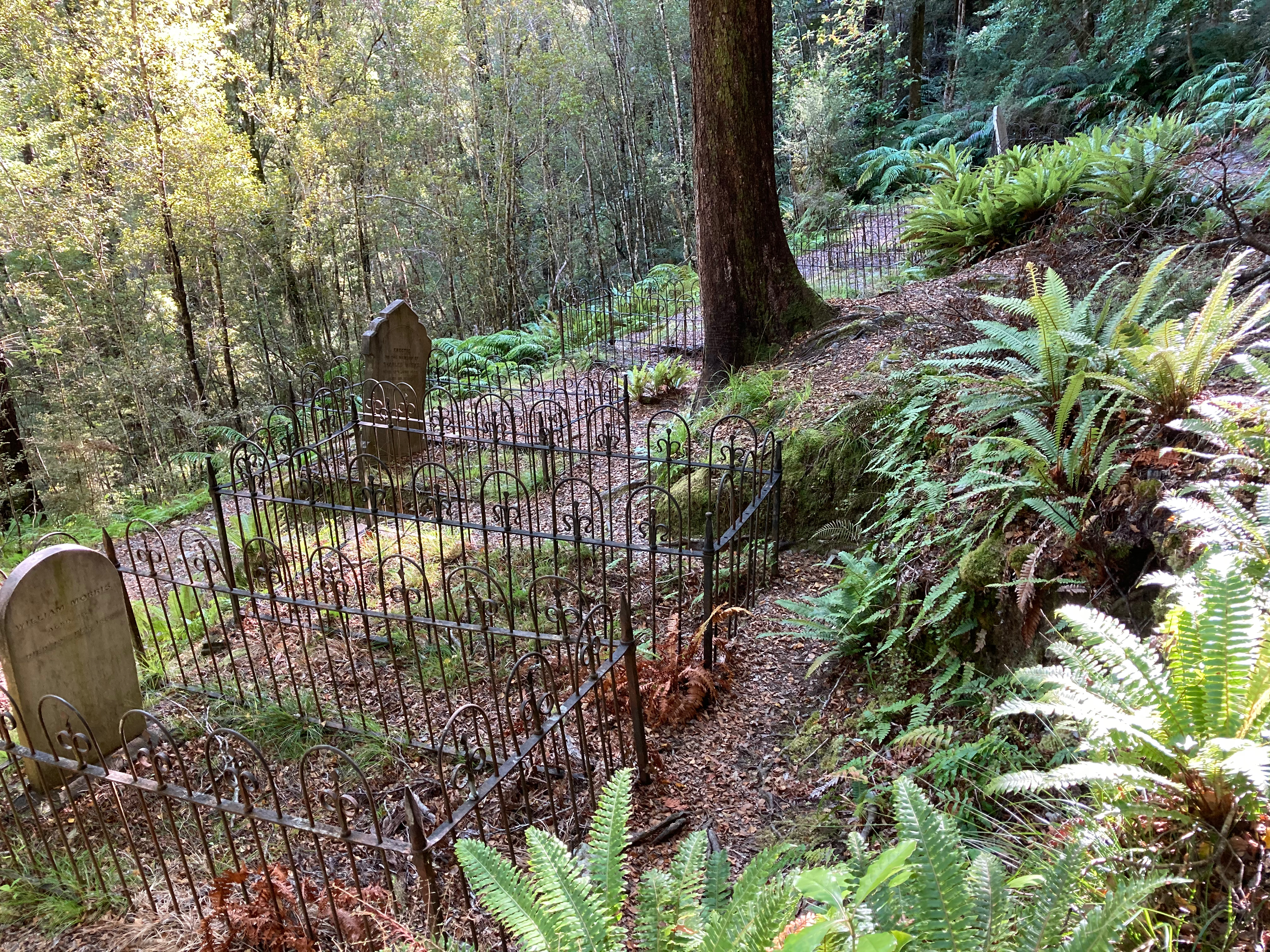
Lyell Cemetery. March 2021

Demographics for the area are covered at Inangahua Junction.
