= West Cape =

West Cape Te Waituna (Māori)
- Cape
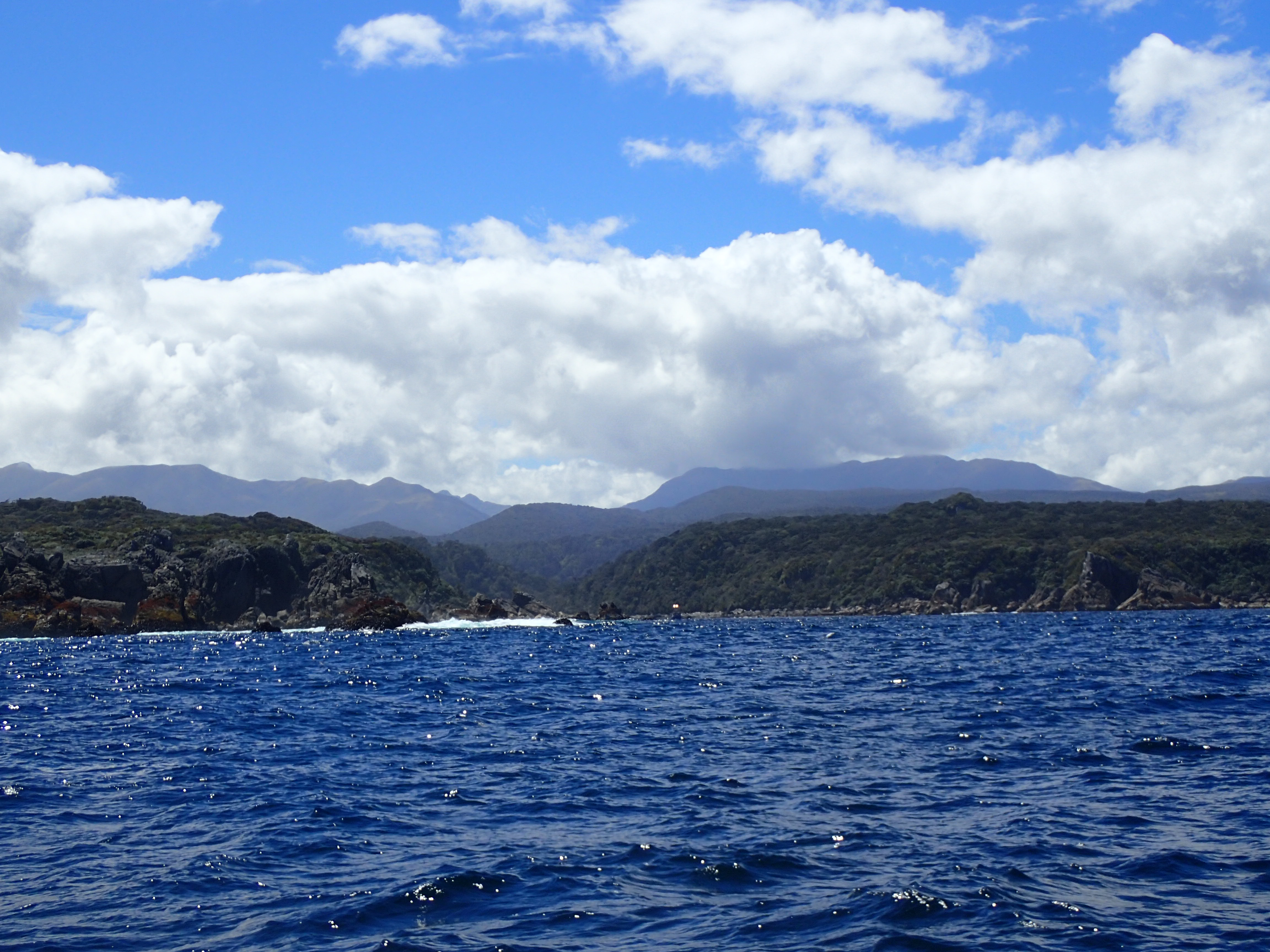
- West Cape & Newton River Mouth, Fiordland, New Zealand

- Location within Fiordland Location within New Zealand
- Coordinates: 45.9060°S 166.4276°E
- Location: Fiordland, Southland District, New Zealand
- Water bodies: Tasman Sea

West Cape is the westernmost point in the main chain of islands of New Zealand. It is located in the far southwest of the South Island, within Fiordland National Park, between Tamatea / Dusky Sound and Taiari / Chalky Inlet. The cape consists of a small rocky shore and low forest-covered sloping land, and is located just north of the Newton River mouth.

West Cape is one of the 4 New Zealand Cardinal Capes, as named by Captain James Cook, on his first voyage to the region in 1769-70. The other Cardinal Capes named at the time are North Cape, Cape East, and Cape South.
