= Tūtaki River =

Coordinates: 41°50′S 172°28′E

Tutaki River

Location
- Country: New Zealand

Physical characteristics
- Mouth
  - location: Mangles River
- Length: 20 km (12 mi)

The Tutaki River is a river of the Tasman Region of New Zealand's South Island. It flows north from its sources southwest of Lake Rotoroa to reach the Mangles River 10 kilometres east of Murchison.

== See also ==
- List of rivers of New Zealand

To access the river you head 6 kilometres (3.7 mi) north of the town Murchison and turn off to the Mangles valley on the right. You will follow the road down the Mangles Valley until a T junction at which point you can choose to head north or south along Tutaki Road. The road follows the river, which is excellent for trout fishing. From the north branch you can turn off and head through the Braeburn track to visit Lake Rotoroa. In the south branch you will find Matakitaki station.
