= Pioneer Energy (NZ) =

New Zealand electricity generation company

Pioneer Energy (previously known as Pioneer Generation) is a New Zealand electricity generation and retail company based in Alexandra, Otago. As of 2024 it owns and operates three wind farms and 18 hydroelectric power stations, with a combined capacity of 94.7MW.

== History ==
The company was formed as Central Electric in 1993 after the Energy Companies Act 1992 required the Otago Central Electric Power Board to reform into a commercial power company. More reforms in 1998 required electricity companies nationally to split their lines and retail businesses; Central Electric decided to retain the generation and retail assets, and rebranded as Pioneer Generation.

In 2012 the company acquired industrial heat generator Energy For Industry from Meridian Energy.

In 2015 it teamed up with Buller Electricity to take over electricity retailer Pulse Energy. The same year it formed the Southern Generation Partnership as a joint venture with The Power Company and Electricity Invercargill. In 2021 the partnership acquired three small North Island hydro-power stations. In May 2024 it acquired the remainder of the partnership. Southern Generation was rebranded as Pioneer Energy Renewables, with Buller Electricity taking a 24.2% stake.

== Ownership ==
The company was initially 100% owned by the Central Lakes Trust on behalf on electricity consumers in the Central Otago and Queenstown-Lakes districts. The trust consists of three appointed and five elected trustees. Elections for the election positions are held every three years, with the most recent election being held in 2025.

In June 2025 the company entered an equity partnership with Māori-led Tōtara Energy to fund further expansion, reducing the trust's ownership to 70%.

== Generation assets ==
=== Operational ===
Name	Type	Location	Capacity (MW)	Annual generation (average GWh)	Commissioned
Aniwhenua	Hydro	Bay of Plenty	25	127	1980
Flat Hill	Wind	Bluff, Southland	6.8		2015
Fraser (Lower)	Hydro	Central Otago	2.8		1956
Fraser (Upper)	Hydro	Central Otago	8		2019
George	Hydro	Central Otago	1		1924
Horseshoe Bend	Hydro	Central Otago	4.3		1999
Horseshoe Bend	Wind	Central Otago	2.3	1.9	2009
Kowhai	Hydro	Central Otago	1.9		2010
Mangapehi	Hydro	Waikato	1.6		2008
Matawai	Hydro	Gisborne	2		2009
Matiri	Hydro	Lake Matiri, Buller	5	28	2020
Mt Stuart	Wind	Manuka Creek, South Otago	7.7	21	2012
Oxburn/Glenorchy	Hydro	Queenstown-Lakes	0.4		1968
Roaring Meg	Hydro	Cromwell, Central Otago	4.3	30	1936
Speedy's Road	Hydro	Waikato		7.7	2011
Teviot Bridge	Hydro	Roxburgh, Central Otago	1.1		1972

=== Proposed / under construction ===
Name	Type	Location	Projected capacity (MW)	Status
Jericho	Wind	Blackmount, Southland	35	Proposed
Kaihiku	Wind	Gore, Southland	300	Proposed

== Subsidiaries ==
- Pioneer Energy Renewable (75.8%)
- Pulse Energy
- Ecogas
