= Takaka (disambiguation) =

Tākaka is a town in New Zealand's Golden Bay. It may also refer to:

In New Zealand

- Takaka County, a former administrative body
- Tākaka Hill, the southern boundary of Golden Bay
- Tākaka River, the main river through the New Zealand town
- Takaka Terrane, a geological feature

Elsewhere

- Takaka, Afghanistan
