= Matiri River =

River in the Tasman District, New Zealand

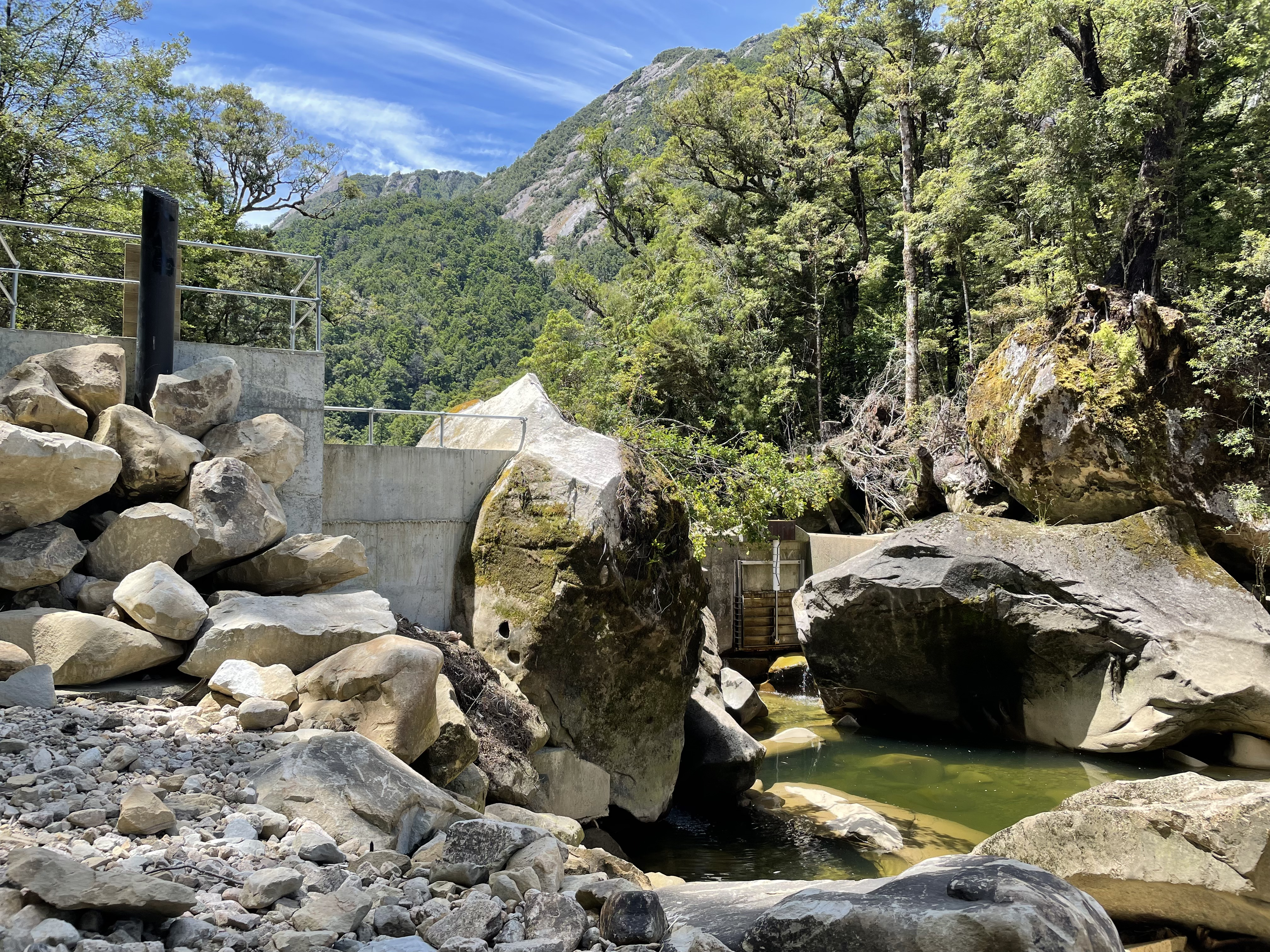
- Matiri Project intake weir
- Route of the Matiri River
- Mouth of the Matiri River Matiri River (South Island)

Location
- Country: New Zealand

Physical characteristics
- Source
  - location: Matiri Range
  - coordinates: 41°29′29″S 172°23′34″E
- Mouth
  - location: Buller River
  - coordinates: 41°46′39″S 172°18′40″E
- Length: 30 km (19 mi)

Basin features
- Progression: Matiri River → Buller River → Tasman Sea
- Tributaries
  - left: Trent Stream, Matiri River East Branch, Sandstone Creek, Valley Creek
  - right: Bull Creek, Bay Creek, Matiri River West Branch

The Matiri River is a river located in the northwest of New Zealand's South Island. The river is in the Tasman Region.

It runs south for 30 kilometres from its headwaters west of Mount Owen in Kahurangi National Park to its confluence with the Buller River just below the town of Murchison. Halfway along its length, it passes through Lake Matiri. Downstream from Lake Matiri the banks of the river has mixed livestock farming and some small scale forestry. Downstream from Lake Matiri, the Matiri River East Branch and the Matiri River West Branch flow into the Matiri River.

== Recreation ==
The river is used for whitewater recreation. It has a tight grade III rapid in a narrow cleft of a gorge a short distance upstream of the road end. There are also two bouldery drops that can only be run in high flows when it may reach grade IV. The river is considered to be best run when the Buller River is too high and dangerous.

A tramping track that starts at the road end runs along the western side of the river.

== Hydroelectricity ==
New Zealand Energy Limited have proposed the Matiri Project hydroelectric power scheme on the river.
