= Jessie Weston =

Jessie Weston may refer to:

- Jessie Weston (scholar) (1850–1928), English independent scholar, medievalist and folklorist
- Jessie Weston (writer) (1865–1939), New Zealand novelist and journalist
