= John Barnicoat =

New Zealand politician, surveyor, engineer (1814–1905)

The Honourable John Barnicoat
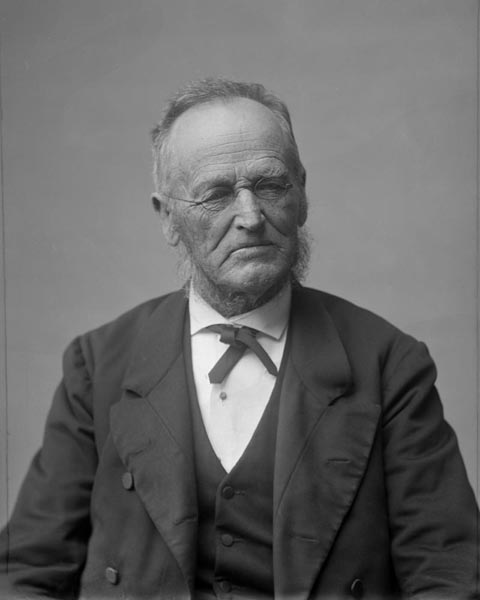
- Barnicoat (year unknown)

Member of the New Zealand Legislative Council
- In office 14 May 1883 – 21 June 1902

Personal details
- Born: John Wallis Barnicoat; June 1814 Falmouth, Cornwall, England
- Died: 2 February 1905 (aged 90) Nelson
- Spouse: Rebecca Lee Hodgson (m. 1849)
- Children: Constance Barnicoat

John Wallis Barnicoat (June 1814 – 2 February 1905) was an English civil engineer and surveyor who emigrated to New Zealand. In his chosen homeland, he became a local politician in Nelson. Towards the end of his life, he was a member of the New Zealand Legislative Council for 19 years.

== Early life ==
Barnicoat was born in Falmouth, Cornwall, England in June 1814. He received his early education at Falmouth proprietary school and then articled to a civil engineer. He practised in that profession for some years before he left England on the Lord Auckland for New Zealand. The Lord Auckland left from the West India Docks in London on 25 September 1841 and they arrived in Nelson on 23 February 1842.

== Life in New Zealand ==
Barnicoat took up survey contracts in Waimea and the Moutere valley for the New Zealand Company. He worked alongside fellow civil engineer Thomas John Thompson with whom he had shared a cabin on the Lord Auckland. Barnicoat was present at the Wairau Affray and escaped without injury together with fellow surveyor Frederick Tuckett. Together with Tuckett, Barnicoat then surveyed the districts of Motueka and Tākaka. During 1844, Barnicoat travelled as an assistant to Tuckett along the east coast of the South Island to find a suitable "New Edinburgh" settlement for the New Zealand Company; Tuckett's choice of Dunedin as the site was later accepted. In late 1844, Barnicoat settled on land near Richmond. Further exploration happened in 1846, when he explored Pelorus Sound / Te Hoiere in the Marlborough Sounds, and in 1850, when he searched for a more direct route connecting Nelson and the Wairau alongside John Tinline. They found a route through Rai Valley and the Tinline River commemorates the discovery.

== Political career ==
Barnicoat was elected to the first Nelson Provincial Council in August 1853 in the Waimea East electorate. He remained a representative for Waimea East until the end of 1876, i.e. the whole period that the provincial council system was in place. From January 1858, he was the council's second Speaker (succeeding Donald Sinclair) for the council's remaining period. On 23 December 1861, Barnicoat unsuccessfully contested the position of Superintendent of Nelson Province against the incumbent, John Perry Robinson. After Robinson died on 28 January 1865, Barnicoat was acting Superintendent for two months. He was the council's last Deputy Superintendent from July 1875.

Barnicoat was a member of the New Zealand Legislative Council from 14 May 1883 to 21 June 1902, when he resigned.

== Private life ==
Barnicoat married Rebecca Lee Hodgson in 1849. During 1865, Barnicoat and her brother, William Charles Hodgson (1826–1894), were both members of the Nelson Provincial Council.

Barnicoat died at his home in Hardy Street, Nelson, on 2 February 1905. He was the father of Constance Barnicoat.
