= Gillian Thornley =

New Zealand mathematician

- Born: Gillian Brown; 1940 (age 84–85); Murchison, New Zealand
- Scientific career
- Fields: Mathematics, differential geometry

Gillian Thornley is a retired New Zealander mathematician.

Gillian Brown Thornley was born in 1940 in Murchison, New Zealand. Living on the family dairy farm, she won a scholarship to board at Nelson College for Girls and in 1958 enrolled at Canterbury University where she graduated with a masters with first class honours in mathematics in 1963. At Canterbury she was a contemporary of Beatrice Tinsley.

== Academic career ==
Thornley received her PhD in metric differential geometry from the University of Toronto in 1963. She returned first to Canterbury then took up a two-year lectureship in Trinidad at the University of The West Indies. She then moved back to New Zealand (Nelson and Wellington), combining part-time positions in both academia and the public service (where she worked on economic modelling) with caring for her two young children. She joined the mathematics institute at Massey University, Palmerston North, remaining there from 1980 to her retirement in 2006. In 1989 she was elected first woman President of the New Zealand Mathematical Society. Thornley presented at the 1990 Conference of the International Mathematics Organisation on the experience of women mathematicians in academia. She also co-authored an article in 2001 on the experience of mathematics doctoral students in New Zealand.

The Gillian Thornley Award was inaugurated by the New Zealand Mathematical Society in her honour in 2020.

== Selected works ==
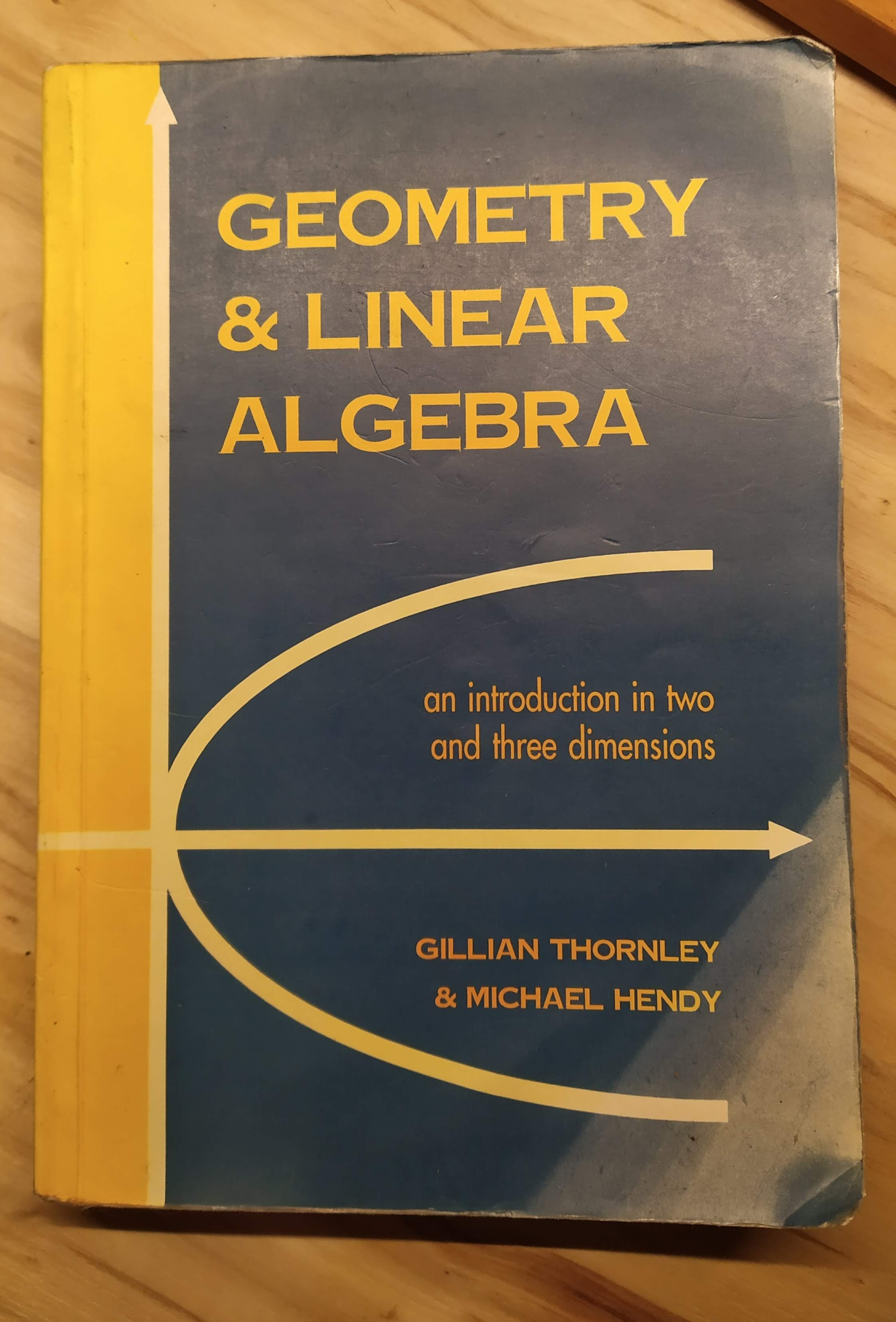

- Gillian Thornley and Michael Hendy. "Geometry & Linear Algebra an introduction in two and three dimensions". The Dunmore Press Limited. ISBN 0864690533 (1986).
- Knight, Gordon, Greg Arnold, Michael Carter, Peter Kelly, and Gillian Thornley. "The mathematical needs of school leavers." Journal issue 1 (1994).
- Morton, Margaret, and Gillian Thornley. "Experiences of doctoral students in mathematics in New Zealand." Assessment & Evaluation in Higher Education 26, no. 2 (2001): 113–126.
- Senarath, Padma, and Gillian M. Thornley. Locally Projectively Flat Finsler Spaces with ([alpha],[beta])-metrics. Institute of Fundamental Sciences, Massey University, 2004.
