= Aimée Eveline Mills =

New Zealand doctor and social reformer in Edinburgh

- Born: 1860; Nelson Province, New Zealand
- Died: 1948 (aged 87–88); Clevedon, Somerset, England
- Education: Canterbury College (B.A., M.A.); University of Otago; University of Edinburgh (M.B.Ch.B.)
- Occupation: Physician
- Known for: New Zealand woman doctor and social reformer in Edinburgh, Scotland.
- Spouse: John Herbert Gibbs

Aimée Eveline Mills or Aimée Eveline Gibbs; Annie Eveline Mills; Mrs John Herbert Gibbs; Aimee Evelyn Mills (1860–1948) was a New Zealand doctor and social reformer in Edinburgh, Scotland.

== Biography ==
Mills was born in Nelson Province on New Zealand's south island and was educated at West Christchurch School and Christchurch Girls' High School before entering Canterbury College in 1885.

She taught at Christchurch Girls High School while still a student at Canterbury College and continued for ten years after graduating with a B.A. in 1888 and a M.A. Hons in Latin and English in 1889. Then in 1900, she changed to study medicine at the University of Otago.

She left New Zealand c. 1901 to study at the University of Edinburgh from 1901 to 1904.

In 1902, the Lyttleton Times reported that in her latest university examinations she gained "first-class honours in Practical Pathology, first-class with the Bow Prize in Public Health, first-class and prize in Forensic Medicine, and first-class honours in Insanity."

She graduated from the University of Edinburgh in M.B. Ch.B. in 1904 and went on to hold resident physician roles in hospitals in London, Dublin, Ireland and Leith, Edinburgh.

She then met and married Edinburgh surgeon John Herbert Gibbs in 1906 and seems to have given up medical work following her marriage. The couple had one son.

== Death and legacy ==
Mills was prominent in the women's movement in Edinburgh and was a strong supporter of women's higher education and women's rights.

Mills died in Clevedon in Somerset, England in 1948.
