= Murchison, New Zealand =

Town in Tasman, New Zealand

Murchison
- Rural settlement
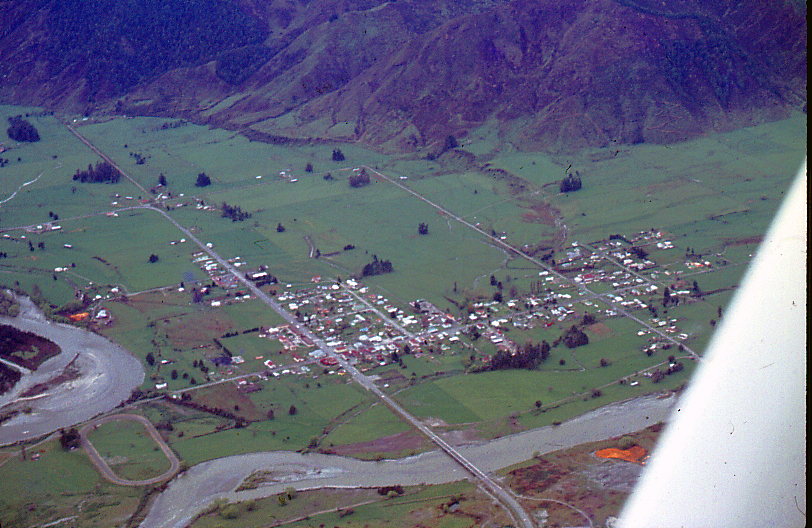
- Aerial view of Murchison in 1978
- Interactive map of Murchison
- Coordinates: 41°48′S 172°20′E
- Country: New Zealand
- Territorial authority: Tasman
- Ward: Lakes-Murchison Ward
- Electorates: West Coast-Tasman; Te Tai Tonga (Māori)

Government
  - Territorial Authority: Tasman District Council
  - Mayor of Tasman: Tim King
  - West Coast-Tasman MP: Maureen Pugh
  - Te Tai Tonga MP: Tākuta Ferris

Area
  - Total: 4.34 km^{2} (1.68 sq mi)

Population (June 2025)
  - Total: 540
  - Density: 120/km^{2} (320/sq mi)
- Postcode(s): 7007
- Area code: 03

Murchison is a town in the Tasman Region of the South Island of New Zealand. It is near the western end of the "Four Rivers Plain", at the confluence of the Buller River and the Mātakitaki River. The other two rivers are the Mangles River, and the Matiri River. It is a rural service town for the surrounding mixed farming district, approximately halfway between Westport and Nelson. Murchison was named after the Scottish geologist Roderick Murchison, one of the founders of the Royal Geographical Society.

== History ==
During the period 1853 to 1876, the area that became Murchison was administered as part of Nelson Province. The future settlement of Murchison did not come into being until gold was discovered in the area, and the town was surveyed in 1865, under the name Hampden.

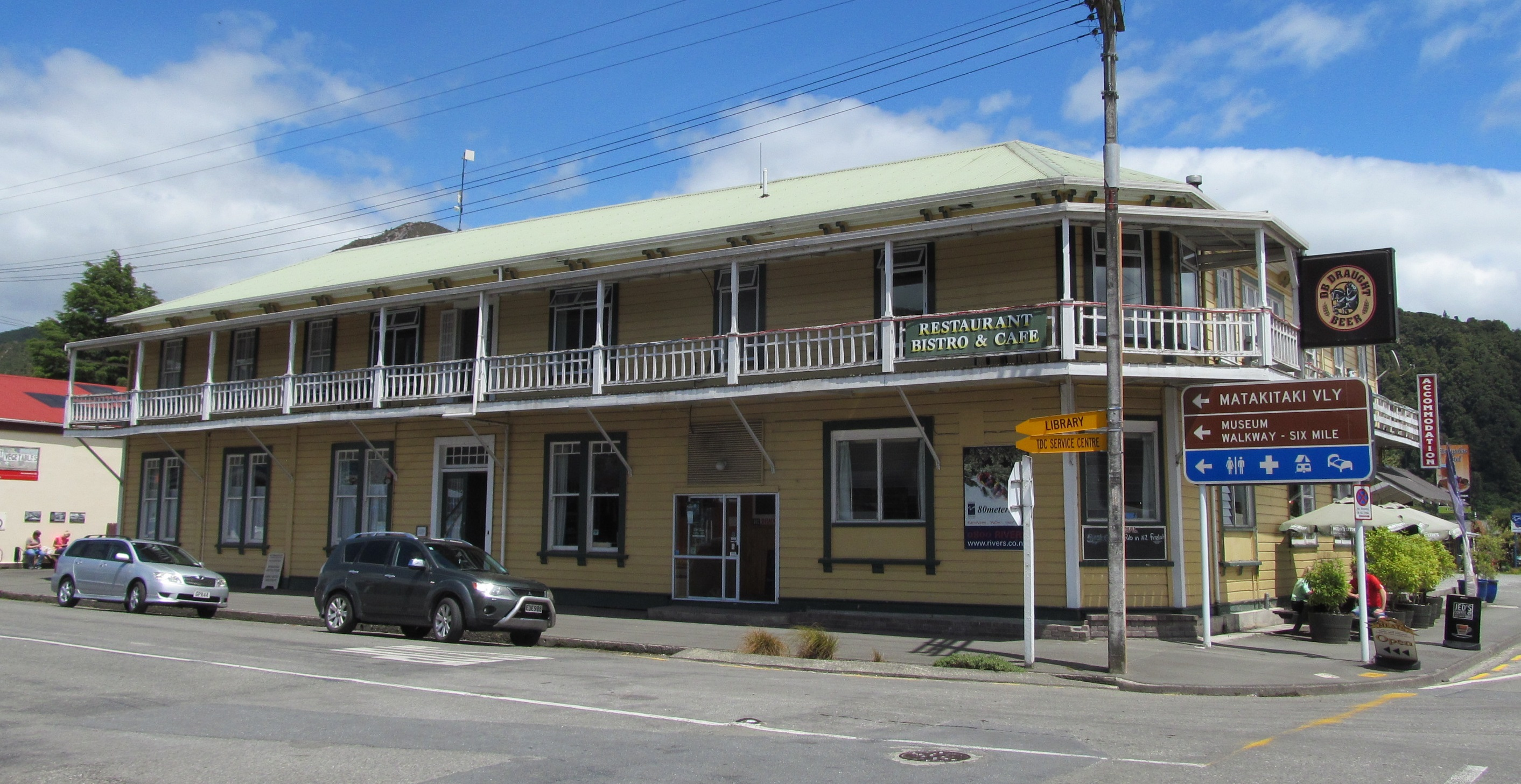
The 19th century Hampden Hotel on the main street of Murchison. The hotel's name recalls the town's original (1865–1882) name.

With the Abolition of Provinces Act 1876, the new Murchison County was created, taking over administration of its area in January 1877, with Hampden as the county's headquarters. The town changed its name to Murchison in 1882, taking its name from the county, to avoid confusion with another South Island town with the same name.

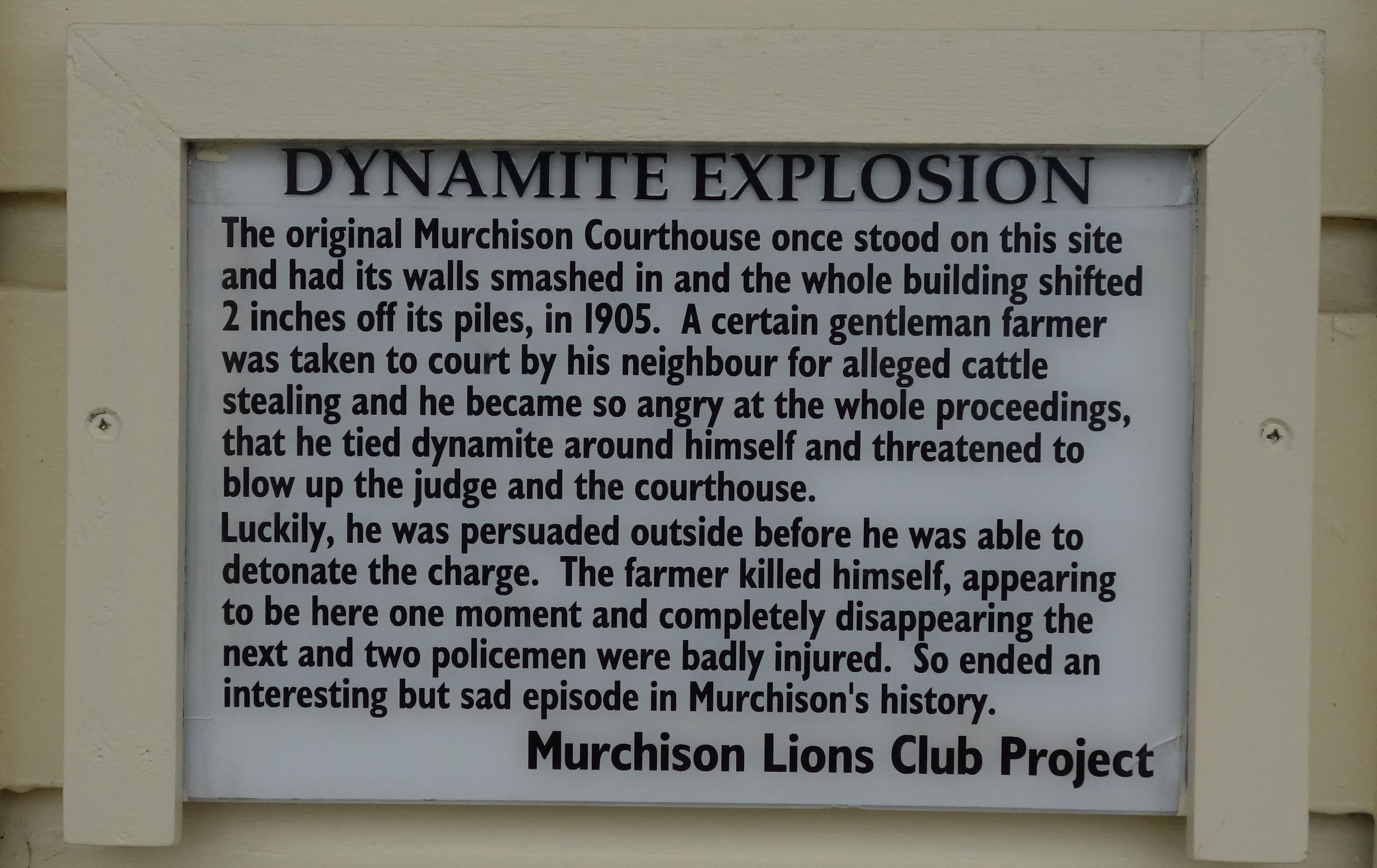
Commemorative plaque for the 1905 Murchison suicide attack

The world's earliest non-military suicide attack is believed to have occurred in Murchison on 14 July 1905. A long-standing dispute between two farmers resulted in a court case, and the defendant (Joseph Sewell) had sticks of gelignite strapped to his body. When Sewell excitedly shouted during the court sitting, "I'll blow the devil to hell, and I have enough dynamite to do just that", he was ushered out of the building. Sewell detonated the charge when a police officer tried to arrest him on the street, and his body was blown to pieces; no one else died from the explosion.

Murchison was the epicentre of the 1929 Murchison earthquake, which resulted in the deaths of 17 people, making it the third deadliest earthquake in New Zealand's recorded history.

Murchison County existed until the 1989 local government reforms, when the Tasman District was formed through the amalgamation of the Murchison County, Golden Bay County, Waimea County and Richmond Borough administrative areas. Since that time, the urban area of Murchison is administered by the Tasman District council, from the district seat of Richmond.

== Demographics ==
=== Murchison ===
Murchison is described by Stats NZ as a rural settlement and covers 4.34 km^{2} (1.68 sq mi). It had an estimated population of 540 as of June 2025, with a population density of 124 people per km^{2}. It is part of the larger Murchison-Nelson Lakes statistical area.

Historical population for Murchison
| Year | Pop. | ±% p.a. |
|---|---|---|
| 2006 | 336 | — |
| 2013 | 435 | +3.76% |
| 2018 | 471 | +1.60% |
| 2023 | 540 | +2.77% |
The 2006 population is for a larger area of 4.62 km^{2}. Source:

Murchison had a population of 540 in the 2023 New Zealand census, an increase of 69 people (14.6%) since the 2018 census, and an increase of 105 people (24.1%) since the 2013 census. There were 267 males, 270 females, and 3 people of other genders in 234 dwellings. 1.7% of people identified as LGBTIQ+. The median age was 50.0 years (compared with 38.1 years nationally). There were 99 people (18.3%) aged under 15 years, 60 (11.1%) aged 15 to 29, 240 (44.4%) aged 30 to 64, and 144 (26.7%) aged 65 or older.

People could identify as more than one ethnicity. The results were 95.0% European (Pākehā); 12.2% Māori; 0.6% Pasifika; 2.8% Asian; 0.6% Middle Eastern, Latin American and African New Zealanders (MELAA); and 4.4% other, which includes people giving their ethnicity as "New Zealander". English was spoken by 98.9%, Māori by 2.2%, and other languages by 5.0%. No language could be spoken by 1.7% (e.g. too young to talk). New Zealand Sign Language was known by 0.6%. The percentage of people born overseas was 13.3, compared with 28.8% nationally.

Religious affiliations were 24.4% Christian, 1.1% Māori religious beliefs, 1.1% Buddhist, 0.6% New Age, and 0.6% other religions. People who answered that they had no religion were 63.3%, and 10.6% of people did not answer the census question.

Of those at least 15 years old, 60 (13.6%) people had a bachelor's or higher degree, 240 (54.4%) had a post-high school certificate or diploma, and 147 (33.3%) people exclusively held high school qualifications. The median income was $30,800, compared with $41,500 nationally. 24 people (5.4%) earned over $100,000 compared to 12.1% nationally. The employment status of those at least 15 was 213 (48.3%) full-time, 81 (18.4%) part-time, and 6 (1.4%) unemployed.

=== Murchison-Nelson Lakes statistical area ===
The Murchison-Nelson Lakes statistical area, which also includes Rotoroa, Saint Arnaud and Tophouse, covers 3,706.01 km^{2} (1,430.90 sq mi) and had an estimated population of 1,490 as of June 2025, with a population density of 0.40 people per km^{2}.

Historical population for Murchison-Nelson Lakes
| Year | Pop. | ±% p.a. |
|---|---|---|
| 2006 | 1,176 | — |
| 2013 | 1,182 | +0.07% |
| 2018 | 1,290 | +1.76% |
| 2023 | 1,491 | +2.94% |

Murchison-Nelson Lakes had a population of 1,491 in the 2023 New Zealand census, an increase of 201 people (15.6%) since the 2018 census, and an increase of 309 people (26.1%) since the 2013 census. There were 771 males, 714 females, and 6 people of other genders in 708 dwellings. 2.4% of people identified as LGBTIQ+. The median age was 48.8 years (compared with 38.1 years nationally). There were 270 people (18.1%) aged under 15 years, 159 (10.7%) aged 15 to 29, 699 (46.9%) aged 30 to 64, and 366 (24.5%) aged 65 or older.

People could identify as more than one ethnicity. The results were 93.4% European (Pākehā); 10.1% Māori; 0.8% Pasifika; 3.6% Asian; 0.6% Middle Eastern, Latin American and African New Zealanders (MELAA); and 5.2% other, which includes people giving their ethnicity as "New Zealander". English was spoken by 98.2%, Māori by 1.6%, Samoan by 0.2%, and other languages by 6.8%. No language could be spoken by 1.6% (e.g. too young to talk). New Zealand Sign Language was known by 0.4%. The percentage of people born overseas was 14.1, compared with 28.8% nationally.

Religious affiliations were 23.5% Christian, 0.2% Hindu, 0.4% Māori religious beliefs, 0.8% Buddhist, 0.6% New Age, and 1.2% other religions. People who answered that they had no religion were 63.2%, and 9.9% of people did not answer the census question.

Of those at least 15 years old, 198 (16.2%) people had a bachelor's or higher degree, 687 (56.3%) had a post-high school certificate or diploma, and 339 (27.8%) people exclusively held high school qualifications. The median income was $31,400, compared with $41,500 nationally. 78 people (6.4%) earned over $100,000 compared to 12.1% nationally. The employment status of those at least 15 was 606 (49.6%) full-time, 231 (18.9%) part-time, and 21 (1.7%) unemployed.

== Attractions ==
Whitewater sports are a popular tourist attraction in Murchison. Nearby rivers include the Gowan River, Mangles River, Matiri River, Glenroy River, Matakitaki River, Maruia River, and the Buller. These rivers vary from Class 2 to 4 whitewater. Kahurangi and Nelson Lakes National Parks are nearby, as well as Lake Matiri and Mount Owen.

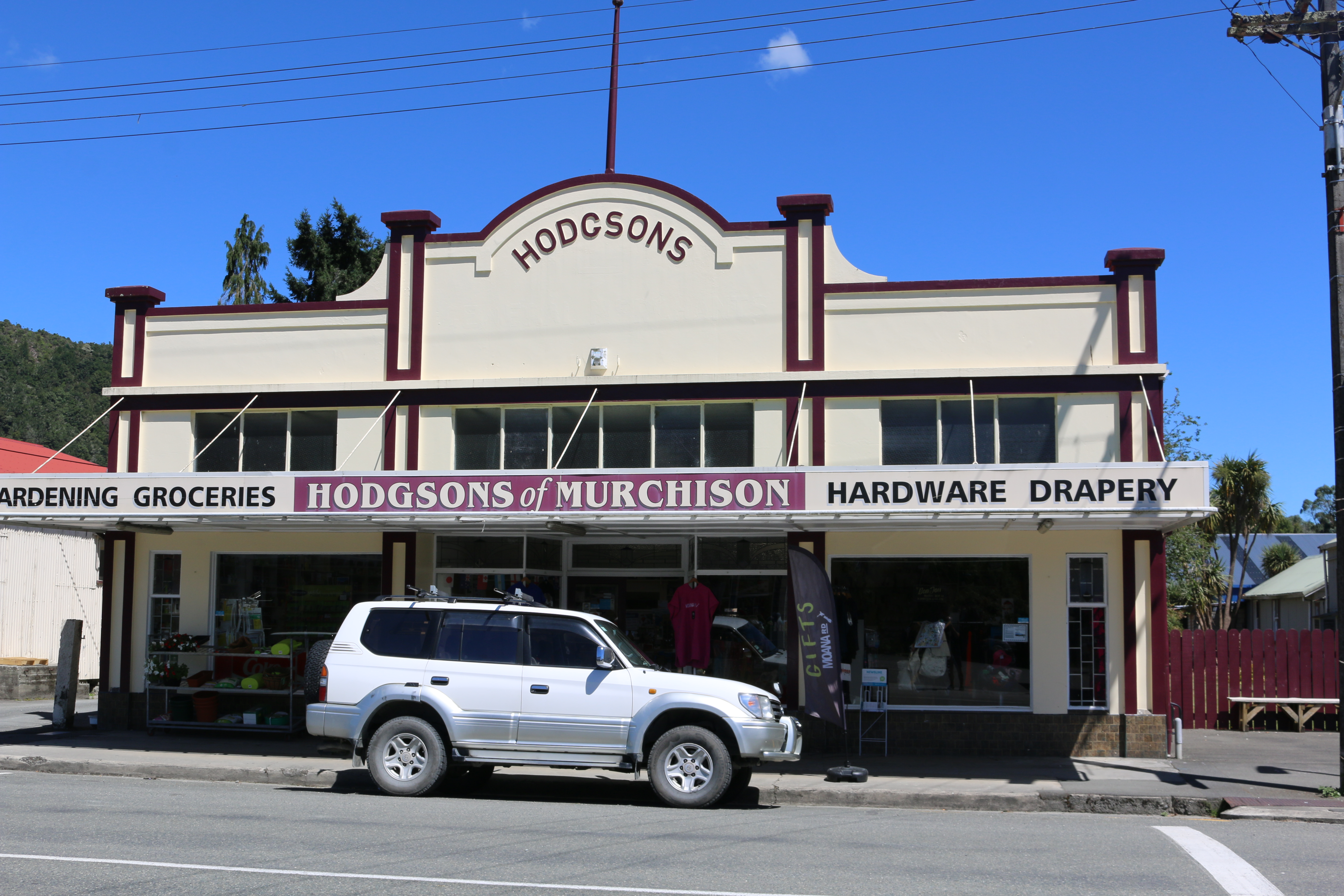
Hodgsons of Murchison (2021)

== Notable buildings ==
=== Hodgsons of Murchison ===
Hodgsons has been the local store in Murchison for over 100 years. It is listed as a historic place category 2 by Heritage New Zealand. It was damaged significantly by the 1929 Murchison earthquake.

=== Murchison Museum ===
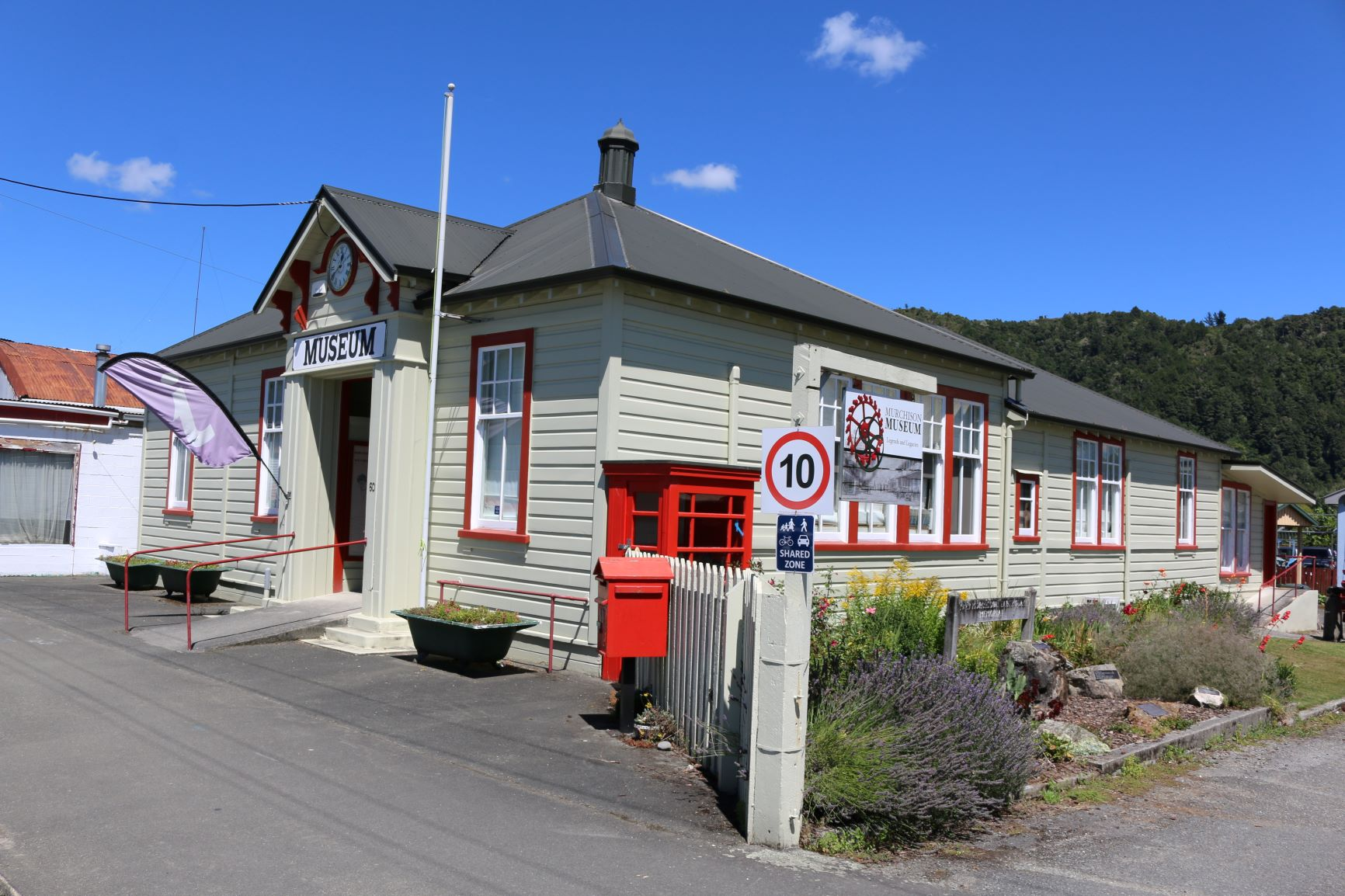
Murchison Museum (2021)

The Murchison Museum focuses on the effects of the 1929 Murchison Earthquake on the township. it is located at 60 Fairfax Street.

=== St Paul's Anglican church ===
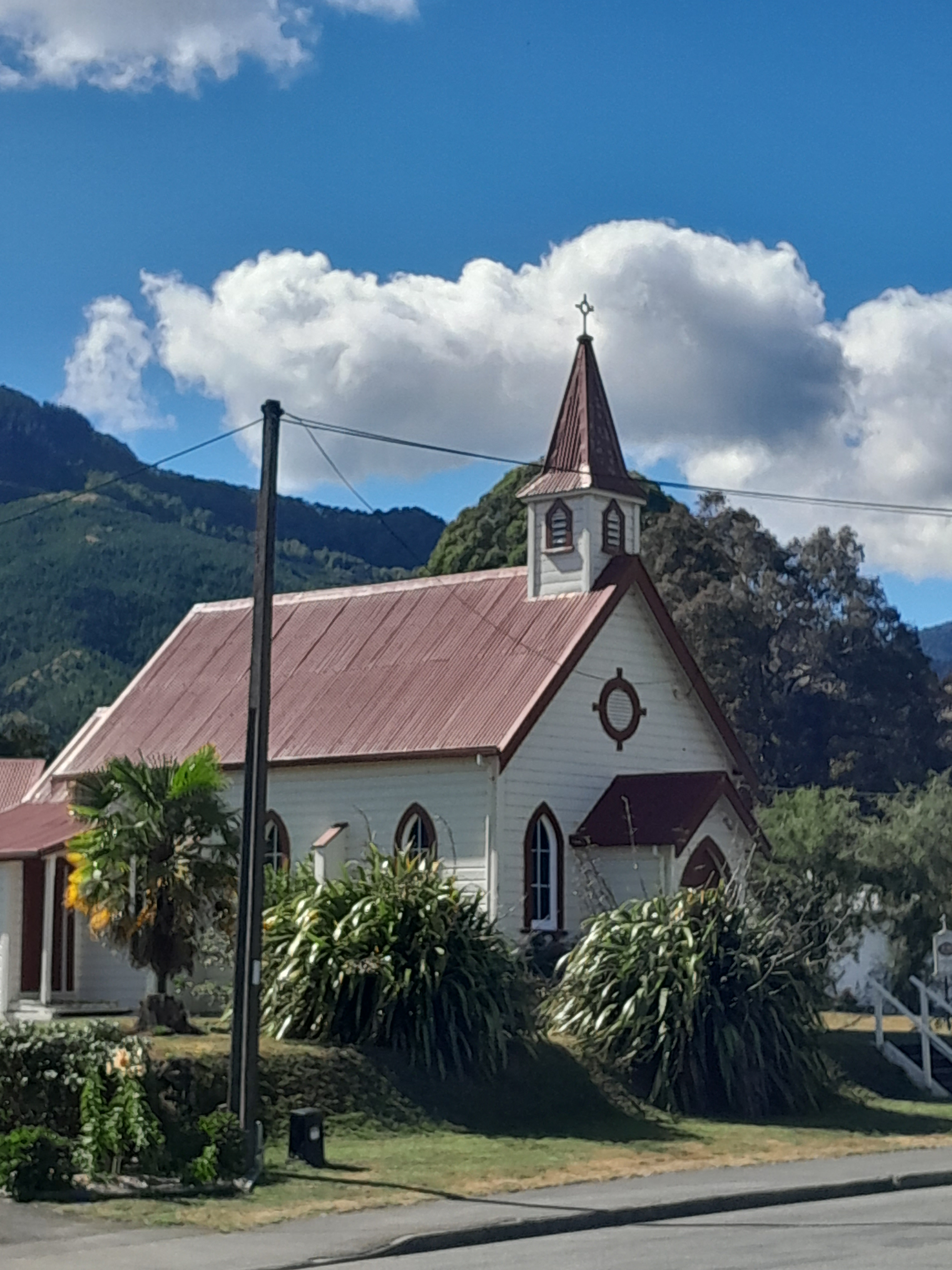
St Paul's Anglican church, 95 Fairfax Street, Murchison (2023)

St Paul's was built in a gothic style on Fairfax Street in 1905. It was designed by Nelson architect David Greg and built by John Downie. It was listed as a category two historic place in 2009.

== Transport and infrastructure ==
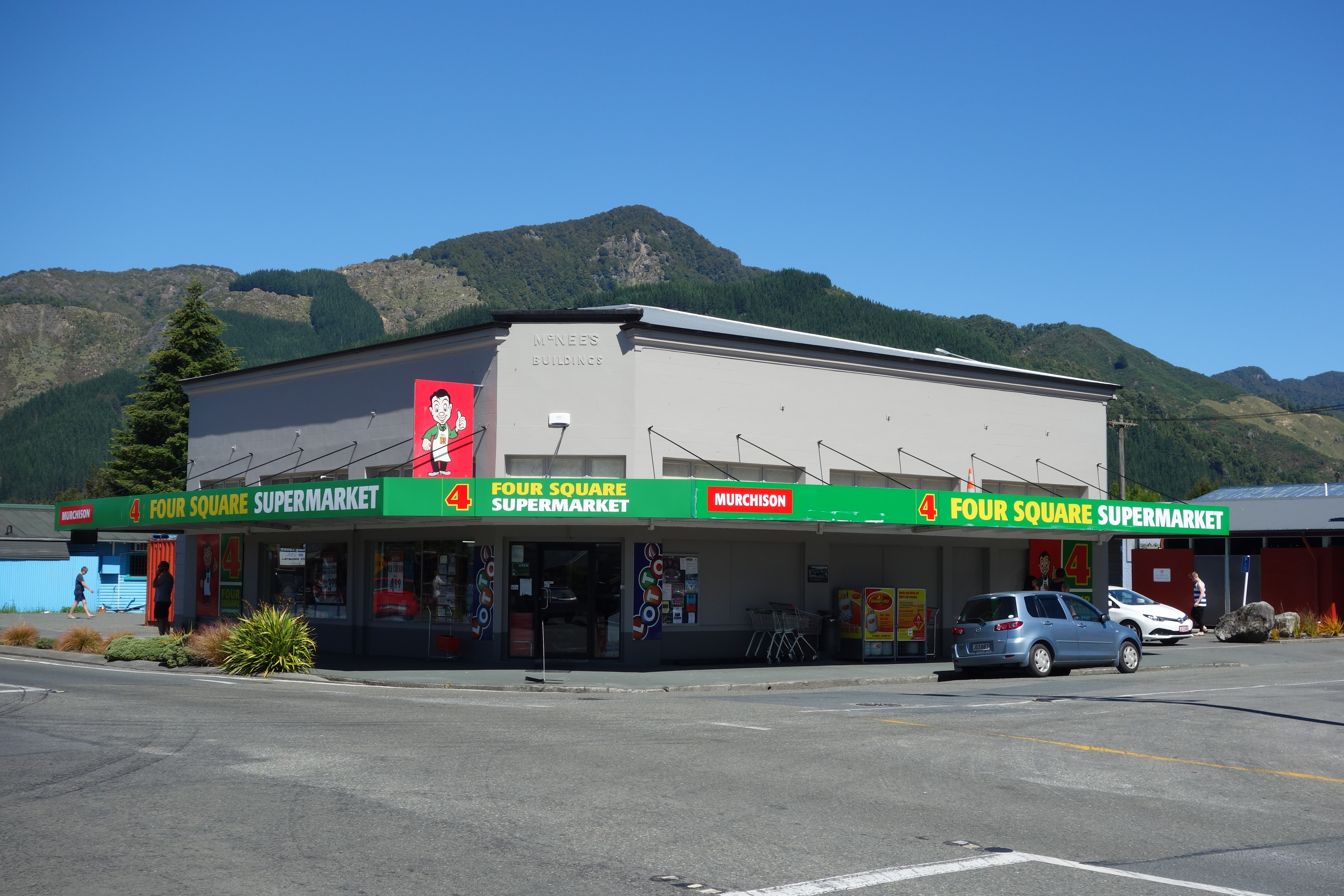
Four Square supermarket in Murchison

Murchison is located on State Highway 6, 11 km (7 mi) east of its junction with State Highway 65 and 35 km (22 mi) west of its western junction with State Highway 63. The town is located on the main route connecting Nelson and Marlborough with the West Coast, and one of two main routes connecting Nelson with Christchurch. After the 2016 Kaikōura earthquake, which closed State Highway 1 and Main North Line through Kaikōura for 13 months, all traffic north of Christchurch to Nelson, Blenheim, Picton and onwards to the North Island was diverted via Murchison. The resulting detour resulted in traffic volumes through the town more than doubling, with accommodation in the town at capacity and food outlets struggling to cope with the influx. Murchison has two petrol stations (Mobil) and bp rural (self-service only), which are adjacent to each other, and one electric vehicle charging station.

Network Tasman owns and operates the electricity distribution network in Murchison. Electricity is fed from Transpower's national grid at its Murchison substation, on Matiri Valley Road northeast of the town.

The Tasman District Council operates reticulated fresh water, stormwater and wastewater systems in Murchison. Fresh water is sourced from two bores west of the town centre, close to the Matakitaki River.

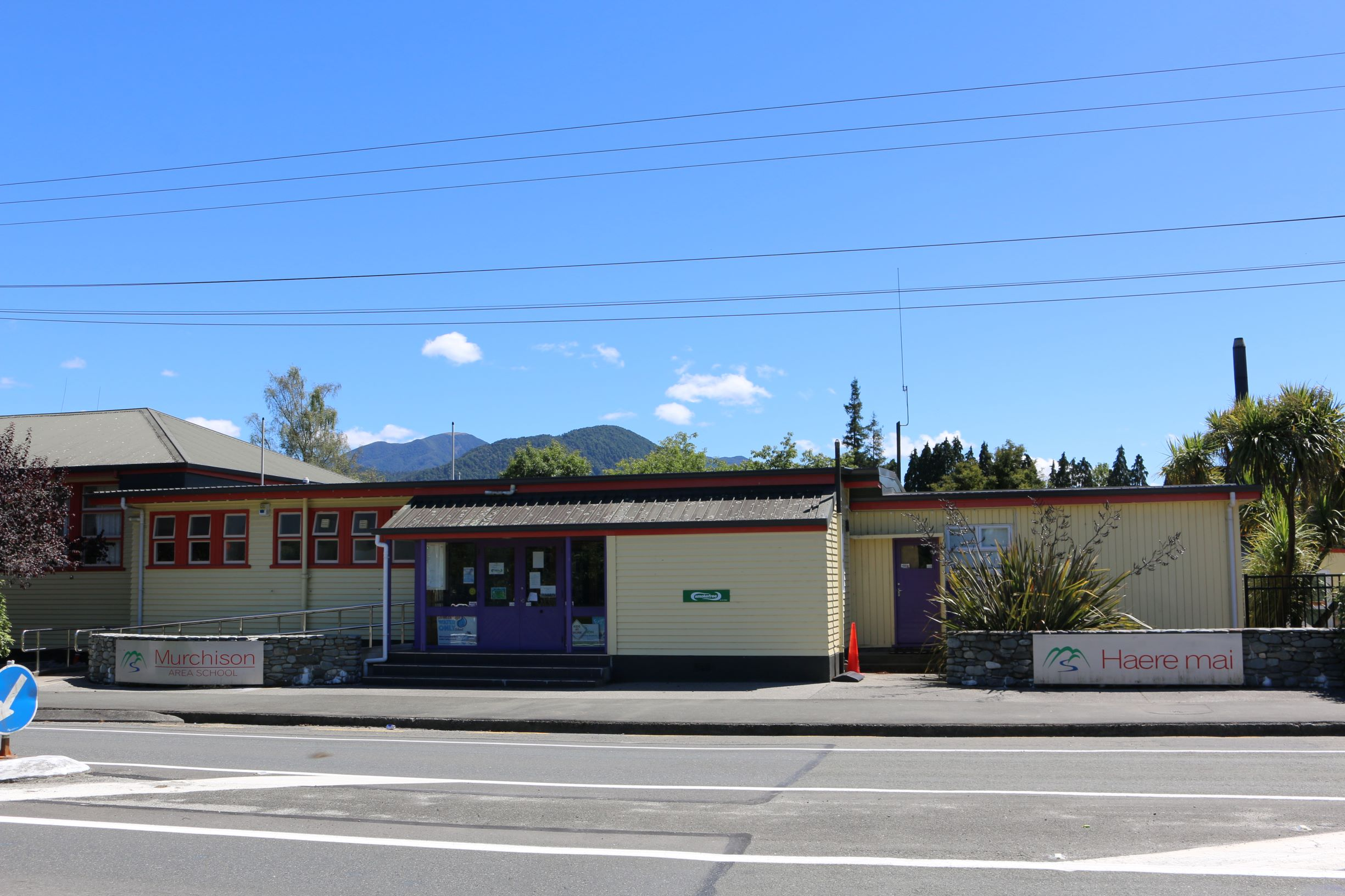
Murchison Area School (2021)

== Education ==
Murchison Area School is a co-educational state area school for Year 1 to 13 students, with a roll of 165 as of July 2026.

Murchison School opened in 1883 although it was not called that until the following year. It became Murchison District High School by 1929. A new school opened in 1947. The District High School advertised its 75th jubilee for 1960 and was extant in 1980. Murchison Area School was the name later in 1980.

== Notable people ==
- Annette King – politician and diplomat
- Muriel Bell – nutritionist and medical researcher

== Climate ==
Climate data for Murchison (1991–2020 normals, extremes 1969–1976, 1998–2013)
| Month | Jan | Feb | Mar | Apr | May | Jun | Jul | Aug | Sep | Oct | Nov | Dec | Year |
|---|---|---|---|---|---|---|---|---|---|---|---|---|---|
| Record high °C (°F) | 36.8 (98.2) | 36.8 (98.2) | 32.0 (89.6) | 27.8 (82.0) | 27.4 (81.3) | 19.3 (66.7) | 18.0 (64.4) | 21.7 (71.1) | 23.9 (75.0) | 27.4 (81.3) | 32.4 (90.3) | 33.5 (92.3) | 36.8 (98.2) |
| Mean daily maximum °C (°F) | 25.8 (78.4) | 25.8 (78.4) | 23.1 (73.6) | 18.8 (65.8) | 14.6 (58.3) | 10.3 (50.5) | 10.3 (50.5) | 13.6 (56.5) | 15.9 (60.6) | 18.3 (64.9) | 21.2 (70.2) | 23.5 (74.3) | 18.4 (65.2) |
| Daily mean °C (°F) | 18.2 (64.8) | 18.3 (64.9) | 16.0 (60.8) | 12.8 (55.0) | 9.7 (49.5) | 6.4 (43.5) | 5.7 (42.3) | 8.1 (46.6) | 9.9 (49.8) | 12.0 (53.6) | 14.3 (57.7) | 16.7 (62.1) | 12.3 (54.2) |
| Mean daily minimum °C (°F) | 10.7 (51.3) | 10.9 (51.6) | 9.0 (48.2) | 6.7 (44.1) | 4.9 (40.8) | 2.5 (36.5) | 1.1 (34.0) | 2.7 (36.9) | 4.0 (39.2) | 5.6 (42.1) | 7.4 (45.3) | 9.9 (49.8) | 6.3 (43.3) |
| Record low °C (°F) | 0.5 (32.9) | 0.5 (32.9) | −2.2 (28.0) | −3.1 (26.4) | −4.6 (23.7) | −8.8 (16.2) | −7.4 (18.7) | −6.3 (20.7) | −4.2 (24.4) | −3.5 (25.7) | −0.8 (30.6) | 0.5 (32.9) | −8.8 (16.2) |
| Average rainfall mm (inches) | 126.4 (4.98) | 75.4 (2.97) | 89.7 (3.53) | 137.9 (5.43) | 139.8 (5.50) | 144.7 (5.70) | 151.1 (5.95) | 134.3 (5.29) | 143.3 (5.64) | 167.2 (6.58) | 139.4 (5.49) | 132.1 (5.20) | 1,581.3 (62.26) |
Source: NIWA (rain 1971–2000)
