= Matiri Project =

NZ hydroelectric scheme

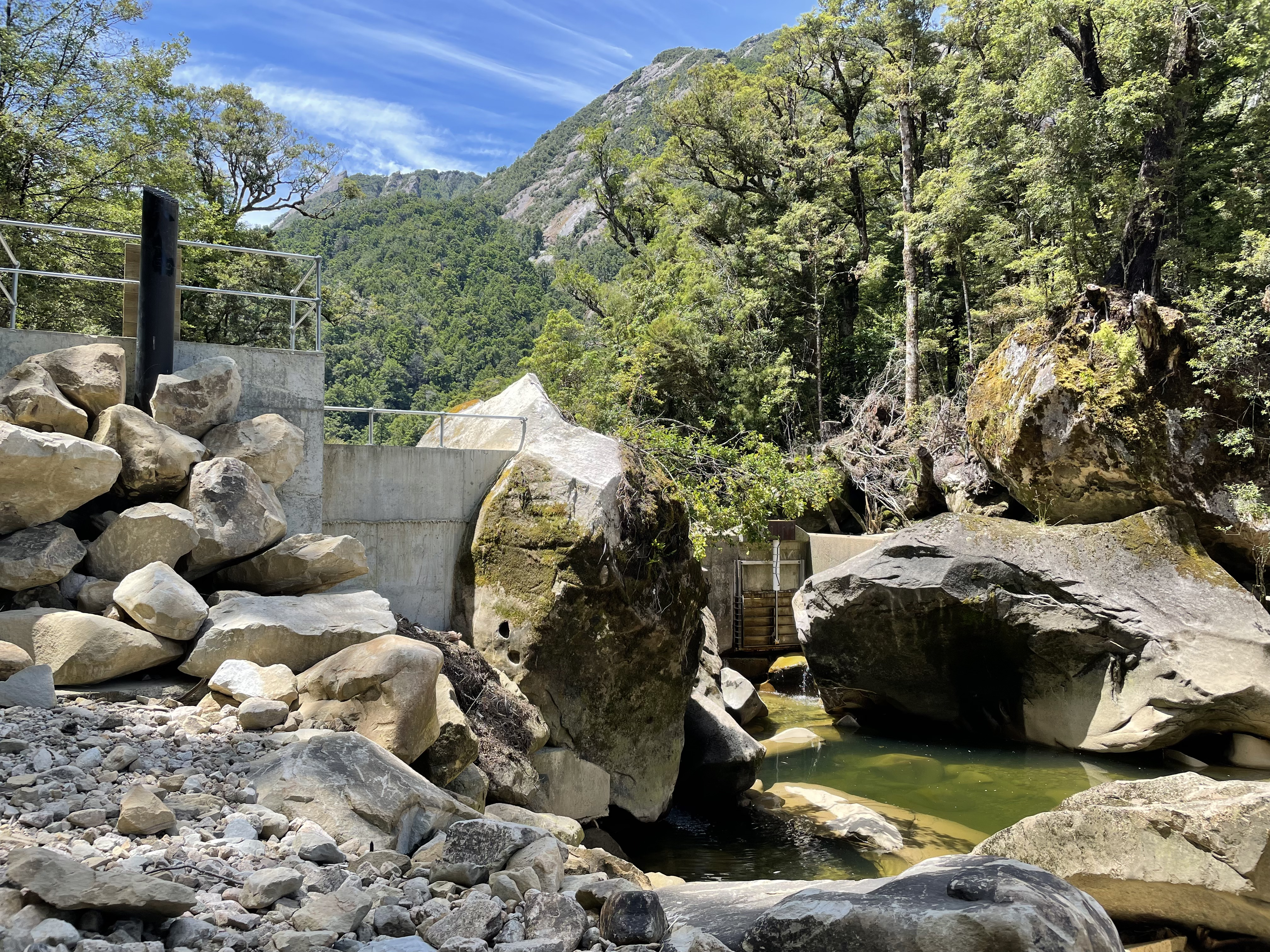
- Intake weir of the hydro scheme
- Country: New Zealand
- Location: Matiri Valley, Tasman District
- Coordinates: 41°39′43″S 172°20′4″E
- Status: Operational
- Commission date: 11 December 2020
- Owner: Southern Generation Partnership
- Operator: Pioneer Energy

Thermal power station
- Primary fuel: Hydropower

Power generation
- Nameplate capacity: 4.6 MW

External links
- Commons: Related media on Commons

The Matiri Project is a run-of-river hydroelectric scheme at Lake Matiri and the Matiri River in the South Island of New Zealand. The project takes water from a series of intake weirs at Lake Matiri and pipes it through a 2.4 km long buried pipeline to a power station.

The project was originally proposed by New Zealand Energy Limited, which applied for resource consent for a 4.6 MW station in August 2008. The scheme was opposed by environmentalists and kayakers some of whom were angry that the resource consents were not notified nationwide. The proposal was approved and it included a concession granted by the Department of Conservation to build structures on public land. Forest and Bird did not see that there would be any conservation gain in giving the approval.

The development rights were purchased by Pioneer Energy in 2014. Construction began in 2018. Construction was delayed by a slip and by the COVID-19 pandemic, and the scheme was finally commissioned in December 2020. Ownership was transferred to the Southern Generation partnership on completion.

== See also ==
- Electricity sector in New Zealand
- List of power stations in New Zealand
