= Kaihiku Wind Farm =

Proposed wind farm in New Zealand

Coordinates: 46.301°S 169.486°E

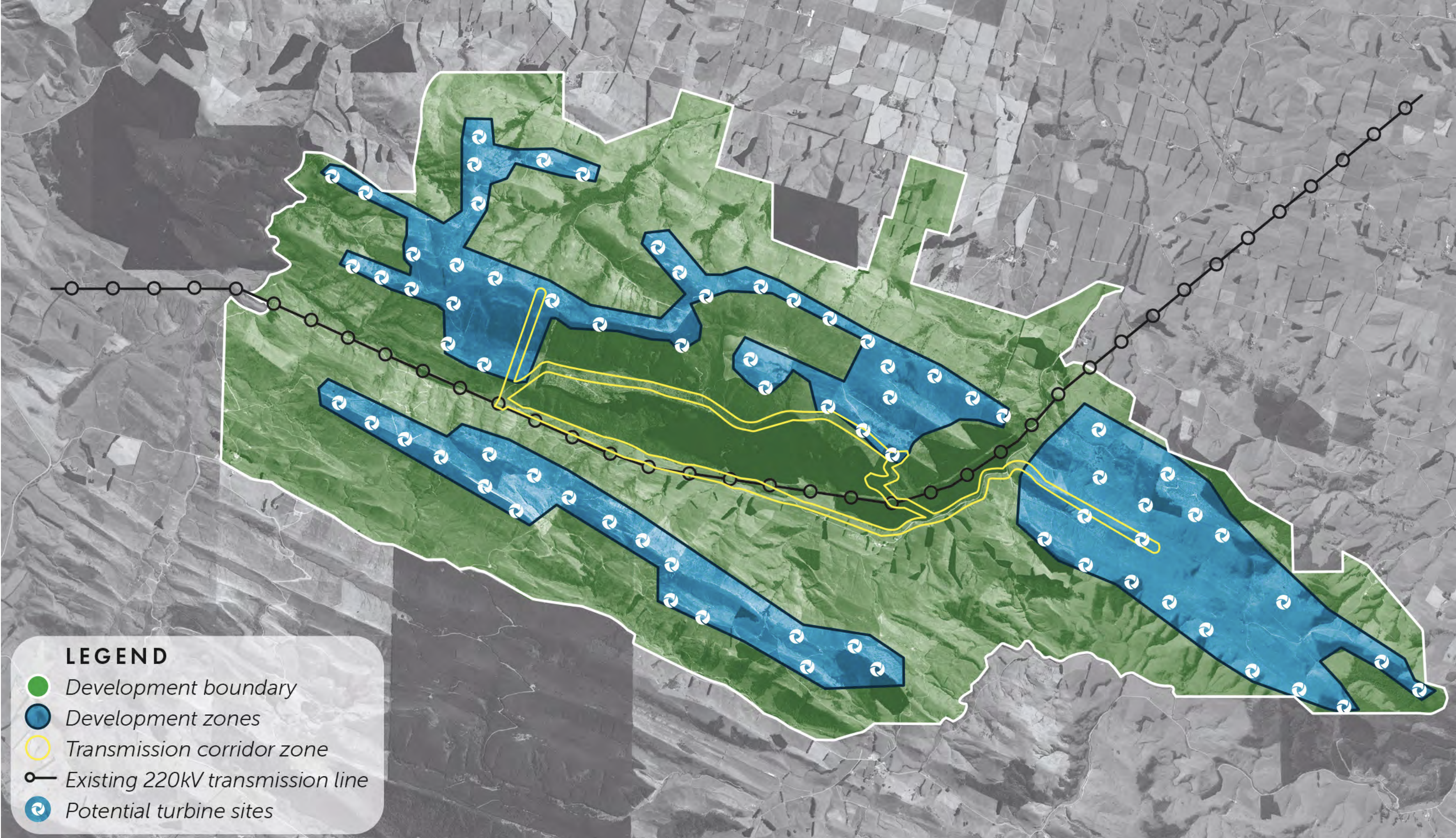
Proposed Kaihiku Wind Farm layout and existing transmission line

The Kaihiku Wind Farm is a proposed wind farm near Gore, New Zealand. As of July 2025, the project is 50-50 owned by Contact Energy (via an acquisition of Manawa Energy), and Pioneer Energy.

== Energy production ==
Kaihiku is proposed to be 300MW across 73 turbines. The site is considered to be a "top tier" resource with average wind speeds between 9.0 and 9.5 m/s. The developer predicts that the farm would generate at maximum capacity 44% of the time, and that the project would cost $750 million to $1 billion NZD to develop. Local reaction to the project was mixed to positive.

In July 2025, Contact Energy announced they had bought Manawa Energy in order to continue the Kaihiku wind farm project, taking a 50% stake in the project. The project has been entered into the fast-track approvals scheme.
