= Waimea Intermediate =

Waimea Intermediate School

Location
- Salisbury Road, Richmond, Tasman, New Zealand; 41.3403°S 173.1949°E

Information
- Type: Co-educational state intermediate, years 7–8
- Established: 1959
- Ministry of Education Institution no.: 3233
- Principal: Justine McDonald
- Enrolment: 621
- Socio-economic decile: 7

Waimea Intermediate is a co-educational intermediate school in Richmond, Tasman District, New Zealand.

== History ==
Waimea Intermediate opened in 1959 with a roll of 485 students.

== Syndicates ==
Students of Waimea Intermediate are split into six different syndicates, which are named after Māori symbols and their associated meaning/proverb.

- Nīkau – importance of knowledge
- Rangiātea – aiming high
- Tū Tangata – shared knowledge
- Kākano – growth
- Tamanui Te Rā – rays of hope
- Tangaroa – strength and vigilance
