= John Robinson (New Zealand politician) =

New Zealand politician (1810/1811?–1865)

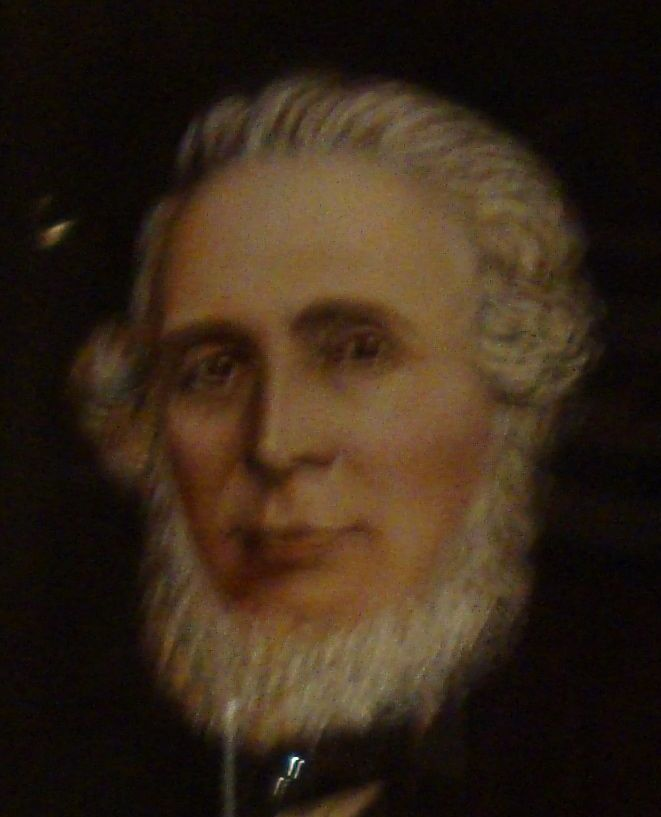
- Robinson

2nd Superintendent of Nelson Province
- In office 1856 – 28 January 1865

Personal details
- Born: John Perry Robinson; 1810/1811? Surrey, England
- Died: 28 January 1865 (aged 53–55) Buller River bar, New Zealand
- Spouse(s): Mary Gaskell (married 1836), ten children
- Profession: Woodturner, storekeeper, politician

John Perry Robinson (1810/1811? – 28 January 1865) was the second Superintendent of the Nelson Province in New Zealand. His election came as a surprise, but he proved so popular that he won two subsequent elections with comfortable majorities. He remained Superintendent until his accidental drowning on the bar of the Buller River.

== Early life ==
Robinson is believed to have been born in Surrey, England. His year of birth is uncertain (either 1810 or 1811). He married Mary Gaskell on 22 October 1836 at Derby. They had two children (Eliza (b. 1838) and Samuel (b. 1840) when they decided to emigrate to New Zealand. They arrived in Nelson on the Phoebe on 29 March 1843.

== Life in New Zealand ==
The economic situation in Nelson in the early 1840s was difficult. The New Zealand Company had not managed to attract a sufficient number of landowners to the area and ended up being the major employer themselves. This led to a shortage of employment positions, and the pay was considered inadequate.

In April 1844, Robinson was appointed headmaster of a school in Bridge Street. The following year, he moved to the Bay of Islands to run an agency for the brewery Hooper and Company. That business failed and he moved to Auckland, but was back in Nelson by 1848. He was employed as a storekeeper before working in his original trade of woodturning again. In 1855, he went to Motupipi in Golden Bay (then known as Massacre Bay) to establish a sawmill with three partners.

== Political career ==
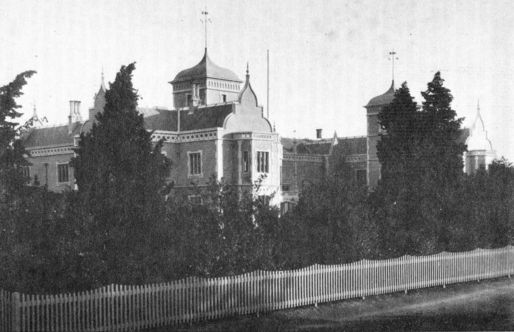
Nelson Provincial Council buildings

In April 1850, Robinson chaired a meeting of labourers, when it was decided to approach the New Zealand Company for its unfulfilled promises. The issues were lack of work and difficult working conditions. He followed this up in 1852 with a letter to Governor George Grey, and in 1854 brought the issue to the attention of the New Zealand Government.

While living in Golden Bay, Robinson was urged to stand for election to the Nelson Provincial Council in 1855 as the representative in the Massacre Bay electorate. At the nomination meeting, the election was contested by Robinson and W. R. Nicholson. A show of hands indicated a majority for Robinson, who was thus declared duly elected.

Edward Stafford, the first Superintendent of Nelson, resigned from the position in September 1856. Robinson and David Monro contested the superintendency on class issues. Monro had represented Waimea in the 1st Parliament and thus had a high political profile. Robinson represented 'the man of small means' (he has been described as a believer in a "society of small-property owners"), whereas Monro represented the wealthier colonists. An history of Nelson published in 1892 described the election campaign as "the keenest, best fought, political battle ever seen in Nelson". On voting day (31 October 1856), the turnout was low. Many of Monro's supporters stayed away, as Robinson was never expected to be able to win. Robinson and Monro received 425 and 409 votes, respectively. With a majority of 16 votes, Robinson was declared elected.

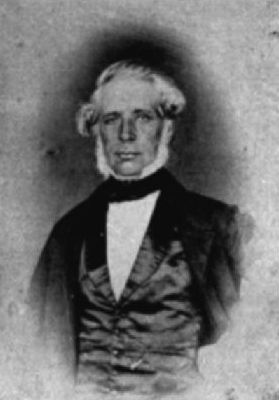
Photo of Robinson

The 1857 superintendency was contested by Robinson against John Waring Saxton. Saxton had been representing Waimea South on the Provincial Council since 1853. The election on Thursday, 8 October 1857 resulted in 681 and 451 votes for Robinson and Saxton, respectively. With a majority of 230 votes, Robinson was re-elected.

The next election was held in December 1861. Robinson and John Barnicoat contested it. Barnicoat was an early settler, having arrived in Nelson in 1842. He was elected to the first Provincial Council in 1853 and later in life (1883–1902) served on the Legislative Council. The election was held on Monday, 23 December 1861 resulted in a large majority of 443 votes for Robinson, who received 685 votes, while Barnicoat got 242 votes.

Robinson thus served three terms as Superintendent, being elected in 1856, 1857 and 1861, with his majority increasing at each succeeding election.

During his second term, Robinson laid the foundation stone for the Provincial Government Buildings in Nelson on 26 August 1859.

=== Separation of Marlborough from Nelson ===
There was considerable conflict between Robinson's policies of supporting smaller land holders, and the objectives of the large pastoral run-holders in the Wairau Valley. The New Provinces Act 1858 allowed for parts of a province to break away if the area was large enough, and enough voters supported such a move. The petition was signed by almost all settlers; only six withholding their support for a split. The new Marlborough Province was gazetted on 4 October 1859.

== Death and commemoration ==
Robinson undertook an official visit on the steamer Wallaby to the West Coast to visit the new gold fields and some coal deposits. On 28 January 1865, Robinson and a party of eight including his son Edward, were lowered into a boat to go ashore, but this boat overturned on the bar of the Buller River. Robinson, the Wallaby's chief officer and two of her crewmen were drowned. Robinson's son Edward survived, only to be drowned 23 years later in similar circumstances at the Waitapu entrance, while attempting to take a boat from the coaster steamer Lady Barkly into Motupipi, Golden Bay, on 2 August 1888. John Robinson's body was never found. He was survived by his wife, two sons and seven daughters. Robinson Street in Greymouth is named after him.

Political offices
Preceded by Edward Stafford	Superintendent of Nelson Province; 1856–1865	Succeeded by Alfred Saunders
