= Collingwood County =

Former county of New Zealand

Coordinates: 41.5°S 172.8°E

- County of New Zealand
- 1876–1956
- History
  - Established: 1876
  - Disestablished: 1956
- Today part of: Tasman District

Collingwood County was one of the counties of New Zealand on the South Island. The county existed in its original form from 1876 to 1904, when Takaka County was split off. This split was reversed in 1956, when the amalgamation resulted in Golden Bay County being formed.

== History of the county ==
The former Collingwood County office building is now used as the Collingwood Museum

During the period 1853 to 1876, the area that would become Collingwood County was administered as part of Nelson Province. With the Abolition of Provinces Act 1876, Collingwood County was created, taking over administration of its area on 1 January 1877. Two ridings were created: Takaka and Aorere. The county existed alongside the Takaka and Collingwood Road Boards, which had been founded during the provincial era.

In 1903, the New Zealand Government voted to reduce the size of Collingwood County to just its western Aorere region, with the remaining eastern region of Golden Bay being constituted as Takaka County, effective April 1904. The two counties were re-amalgamated in 1956 to form Golden Bay County.

Golden Bay County existed until the 1989 local government reforms, when it was amalgamated into the new Tasman District.

The former Collingwood County office building in 2 Tasman Street is now used as the Collingwood Museum. In 1990, the building was registered as Category 2 by the New Zealand Historic Places Trust (now Heritage New Zealand).

== Area ==
Neighbouring counties were Buller County in the south, and Waimea County to the south-east. The boundary between Buller and Collingwood counties was initially at Kōhaihai Bluff, some 16 km (9.9 mi) north of Karamea. This boundary moved north in 1922 towards Kahurangi Point.

== Elected members ==
During the period from 1876 to 1904, there were 34 county councillors. Five of them were chosen as chairmen by their fellow councillors (in this order): Henry Lewis, Joseph Packard, William Calverley Riley, Frederick West, and Andrew Sinclair. In the period after Takaka County had been split off (1904–1956), there were 64 county councillors, of which 13 were chosen as chairmen by their fellow councillors (in this order): G. H. Allan, William Grant, J. Walker, N. L. Buchanan, John Fish, H. B. Riley, John Bassett, A. H. Fletcher, L. D. Flowers, N. J. Doogan, P. G. Fish, W. J. Solly, and H. L. Riley.
