= Jericho Wind Farm =

Proposed wind farm in New Zealand

- Country: New Zealand
- Location: Blackmount, Southland
- Coordinates: 45.72518553200021°S 167.66228766146432°E
- Status: Proposed
- Owner: Pioneer Energy

Power generation
- Units planned: 35MW across 8 Turbines
- Annual net output: 140GWh

The Jericho Wind Farm is a proposed 35 MW wind farm near Blackmount, Southland, New Zealand. It will have eight turbines up to 210m high (to blade tip), and with a rotor diameter of up to 160m.

== History ==
A wind monitoring mast was installed some time in the 2010s on the site, while the land Jericho Station, was under the ownership of Landcorp. The station was sold in 2018 to a private owner. In December 2022, Southern Generation Limited Partnership announced the project saying it intended to lodge consents with Southland District Council and begin construction in 2024 if they were granted.

In August 2024 the project was accepted to the fast track consenting process by the Minister for the Environment Penny Simmonds.

== Operation ==
The wind farm will connect to the 66 KV line immediately adjacent to the site. The line is a ring circuit running from Heddon Bush – Monowai – Te Anau – Mossburn – Heddon Bush and is owned by The Power Company Ltd. The same line already receives power from Pioneer Energy's Monowai Hydro station and Meridians White Hill Wind Farm near Mossburn, and ultimately connects to the national grid at the North Makarewa substation.

== Location ==
The wind farm will be located approximately 25 km south of Manapouri and approximately 50 km north of Tuatapere, near the Blackmount – Redcliff Road. The site is within the Waiau river valley between the Fiordland and the Takitimu Mountains, on a terrace that forms the southern end of the Te Anau basin. The area is presently farmland with shelter belts, an agricultural air strip, and several farm sheds. The land immediately to the south is exotic forestry.
