= Constance Barnicoat =

Secretary, interpreter, mountaineer, journalist

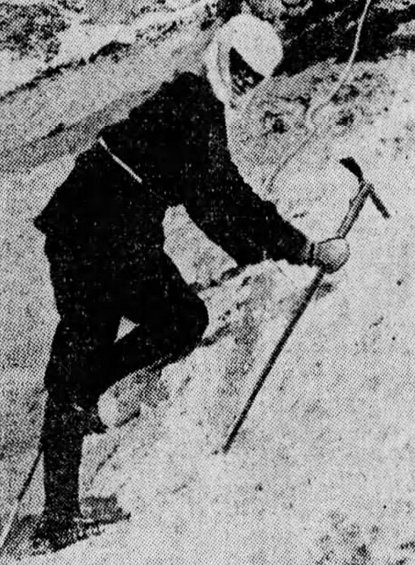
- Climbing the Schreckhorn in 1911
- Born: Constance Alice Barnicoat; 27 November 1872; Richmond, New Zealand
- Died: 16 September 1922 (aged 49); Geneva, Switzerland
- Education: Canterbury College, Christchurch
- Occupations: Secretary, interpreter, mountaineer, journalist
- Spouse: Israel Julian Grande (m. 1911)
- Father: John Barnicoat

Constance Alice Barnicoat (27 November 1872 – 16 September 1922) was a New Zealand secretary, interpreter, mountaineer and journalist.

== Early life ==
Barnicoat was born in Richmond, Nelson, New Zealand on 27 November 1872, the youngest of seven children. Her parents were farmers; her father was John Barnicoat, a member of the Nelson Provincial Council and of the Legislative Council, and her mother was Rebecca Lee Hodgson. Barnicoat was educated at home until 1888, when she began studying at Nelson College for Girls. She attended the school for two years, before moving to Christchurch to study at Canterbury College, Christchurch. She completed a bachelor arts degree, graduating in 1895.

Starting in 1895, she was a secretary in Wellington for almost three years for Dillon Bell, a member of the House of Representatives. In 1896 she was the country's first female shorthand reporter.

== Mountain climbing achievements ==
In the early 1900s Barnicoat became one of the world's most prominent women mountain climbers, ascending peaks such as the Ailefroide, Mount Grindelwald, and the Schreckhorn. In 1905, she ascended the Ailefroide in the Dauphine Alps, France. In 1911 she ascended Switzerland's Grosser Schreckhorn. A peak in the Southern Alps was named in her honor by Julian Grande in 1923.

== Personal life ==
She married journalist and lecturer Israel Julian Grande in London on 29 March 1911. In 1913 they settled in Bern, Switzerland and later moved to Geneva where she died on 16 September 1922.
