= Waimea County =

Former county in New Zealand

Coordinates: 41°20′S 173°11′E

- County of New Zealand
- 1 November 1876 – 31 October 1989
- Capital: Richmond
- Area
  - 1896: 4,304 km^{2} (1,662 sq mi)
  - 1976: 7,511 km^{2} (2,900 sq mi)
- Population
  - 1896: 8,591
  - 1976: 16,651
  - 1986: 18,471
- History
  - Established: 1 November 1876
  - Disestablished: 31 October 1989
- Today part of: Tasman District

Waimea County was one of the counties of New Zealand, covering a large but lightly populated region at the top of the South Island. The county existed from 1876 to 1989.

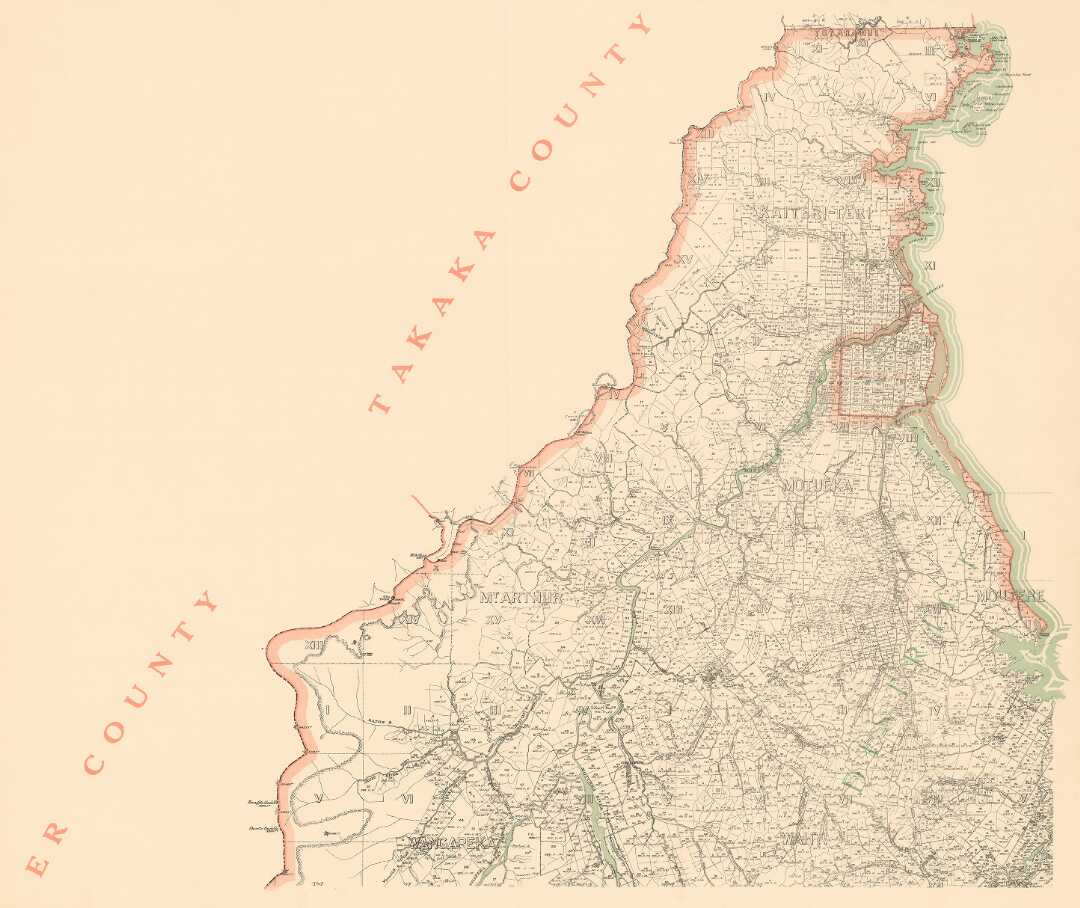
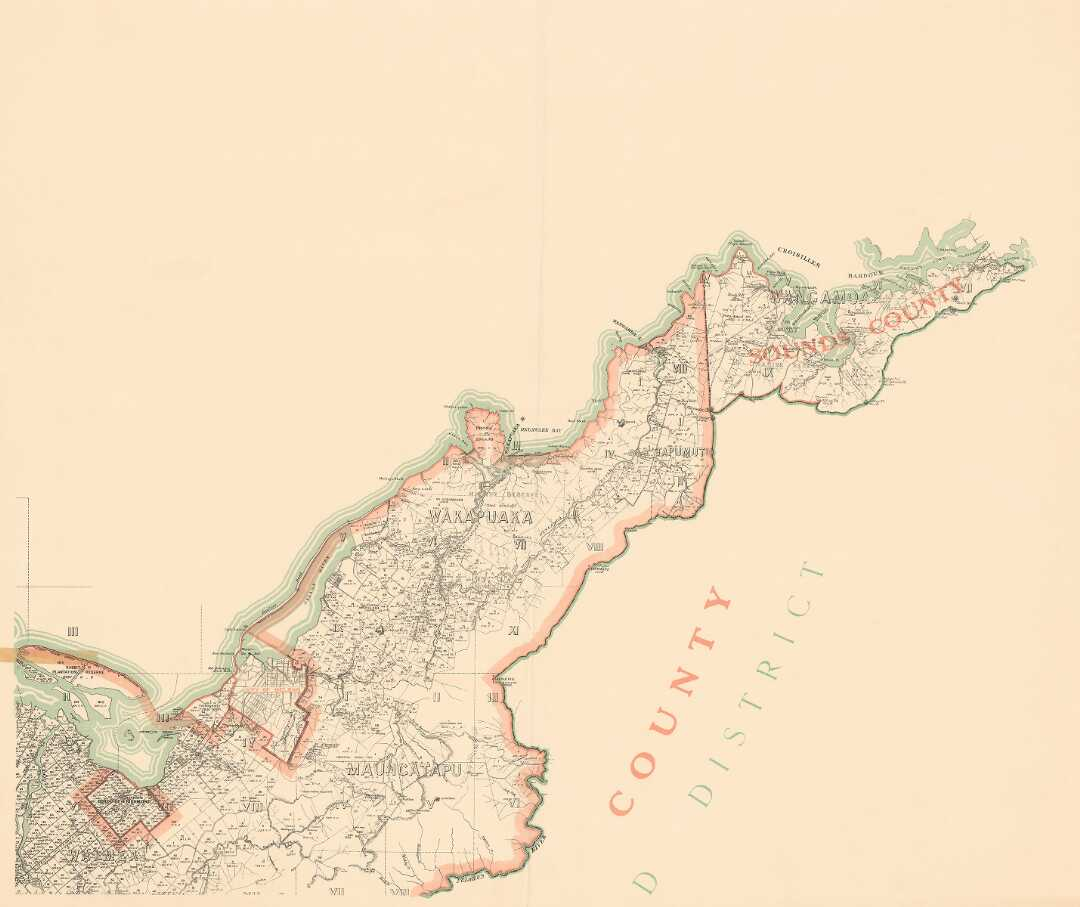
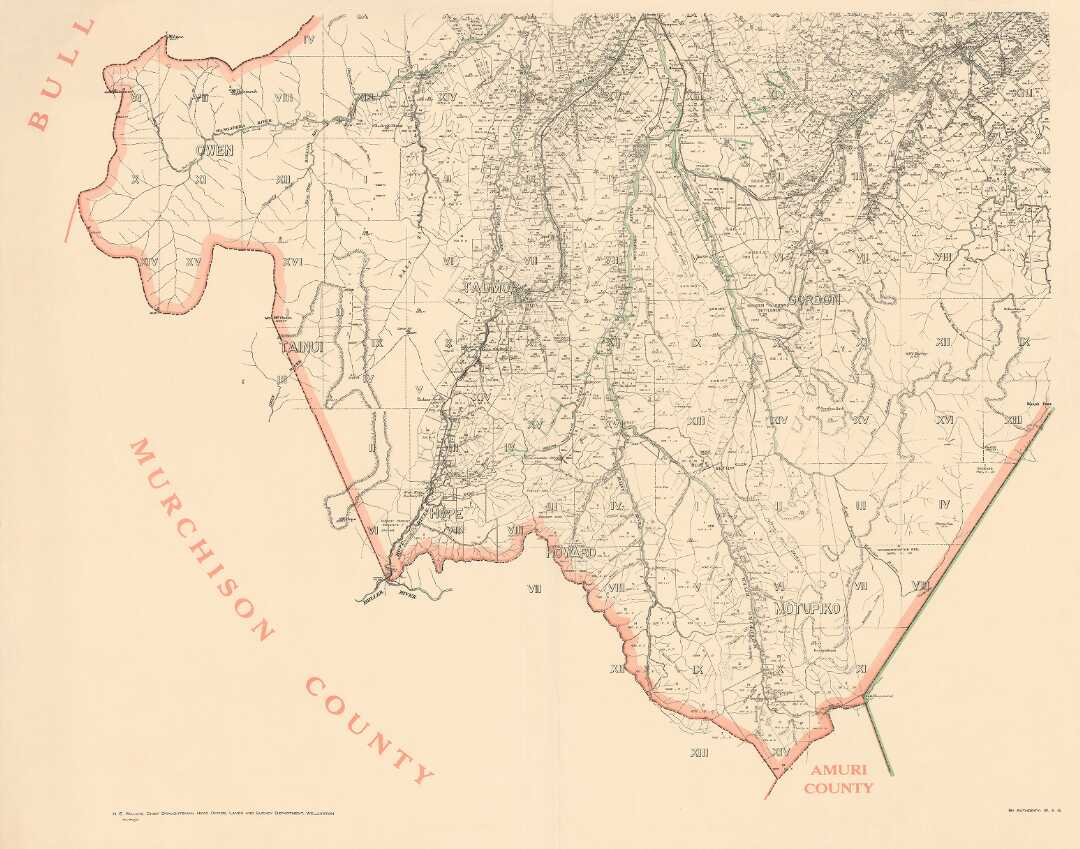
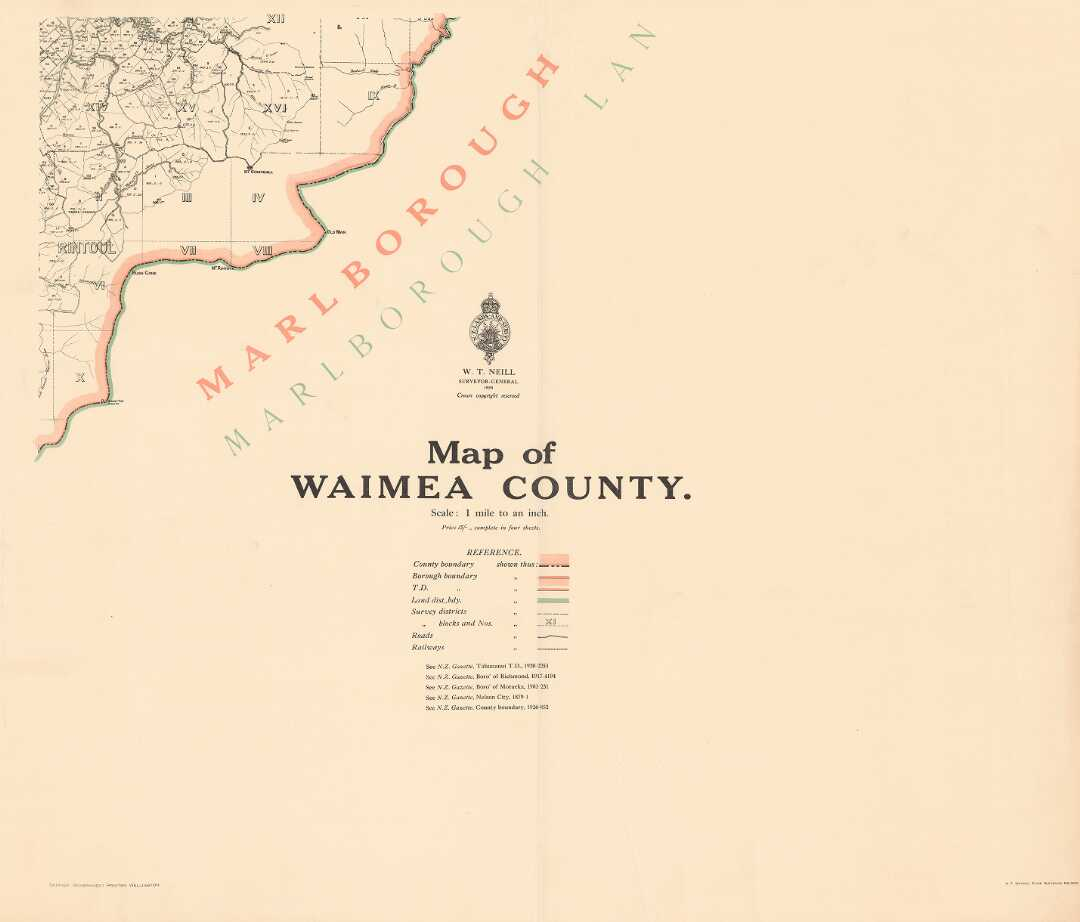
Waimea County in 1928

During the period 1853 to 1876, the area that would become Waimea County was administered as part of Nelson Province. With the Abolition of Provinces Act 1876, Waimea County was created, taking over administration of its area in January 1877. The county council's administrative headquarters was located in Richmond.

Neighbouring territorial authorities in 1928 were (anti-clockwise from north) Takaka County (previously part of Collingwood County and later Golden Bay County), Buller County, Murchison County, Amuri County, Marlborough County, and Sounds County. Neighbouring territorial authorities that were enclosed were Motueka Borough, Richmond Borough, and Nelson City. Stoke, these days a suburb of Nelson, was part of Waimea County and physically separated Richmond and Nelson.

== Geographic extent ==
The area encompassed by the county was set forth in First Schedule of the Counties Act 1876. Roughly, this consisted of the catchment areas of the Motueka, Waimea and Hope rivers, as well as the mountain ranges surrounding Nelson city and the coastline to the northeast. Section 31 of the Municipal Coroporations Act (1876) explicitly excluded boroughs and cities from their surrounding counties. As a result, Nelson was never part of the county.

The county boundaries underwent several modifications. Richmond was awarded borough status on 1 July 1891 and so left the county. Similarly, Motueka left the county when awarded borough status on 6 December 1899.

In 1958, Stoke, Enner Glynn, Wakatu, Annesbrook, and Monaco were taken from Waimea County and amalgamated with Nelson City. Waimea County lost Atawhai to Nelson City in April 1968.

The biggest geographical change to the county occurred on 1 April 1965, when Waimea county merged with neighbouring Murchison County. Technically, this merger abolished both counties, and created a new Waimea County covering both regions.

== Governance ==
The county was governed by the Waimea County Council. A 1954 map shows the council offices located in the Smythe Building on Trafalgar Street in central Nelson. The council moved to a new building on Queen Street in Richmond in March 1966.

The large rural county was divided into a number of Ridings, each with their own representation on the council. The order for the Waimea/Murchison merger in 1965 specified the ten ridings: Wangapeka, Whangamoa, Waimea East, Appleby, Wai-iti, Central, Moutere, Motueka, Murchison North and Murchison South. Each was represented by one member of the council.

== Abolition ==
Waimea County existed until the 1989 local government reforms took effect on 1 November 1989. The Whangamoa Riding, covering the area east and northeast of Nelson, was incorporated into a much-expanded Nelson city. The remainder of the county was amalgamated with Golden Bay County, Motueka Borough and Richmond Borough to form the Tasman District. The regional council function was given to the short-lived Nelson-Marlborough Regional Council.

== Demographics ==
Population and area of Waimea County
Census Year	Population	Area	Notes
1891	8,942		
1896	8,591	1,662 square miles (4,300 km^{2})	excludes Borough of Richmond
1901	7,833	1,662 square miles (4,300 km^{2})	excludes Borough of Motueka
1931	9,150		
1956	17,032	1,537 square miles (3,980 km^{2})	
1961	14,103	1,533 square miles (3,970 km^{2})	excludes Stoke and environs
1966	16,888	2,905 square miles (7,520 km^{2})	merged with Murchison County
1976	16,651	7,511 square kilometres (2,900 sq mi)	
1981	16,878		
1986	18,471		
