= Jessie Weston (writer) =

New Zealand novelist and journalist (1867–1939)

- Born: 1865; Parnell, Auckland, New Zealand
- Died: 21 May 1939 (aged 74); London, England
- Occupations: Novelist; journalist
- Writing career
- Pen name: C. de Thierry
- Notable works: Ko Méri, or, A Cycle of Cathay: A Story of New Zealand Life (1890)

Jessie Edith Weston (also known as Jessie Weston-Campbell, 1865 – 21 May 1939) was a New Zealand novelist and journalist. She was best known for her novel Ko Méri, or, A Cycle of Cathay: A Story of New Zealand Life (also known as Ko Meri), published in 1890. The novel formed part of what was termed the Maoriland movement in New Zealand literature. She spent the rest of her life living in the United Kingdom, where she wrote articles promoting imperialism for British newspapers and magazines, and published a collection of essays called Imperialism (1898) under her pseudonym C. de Thierry.

== Early life ==
Weston was born in Parnell, a suburb of Auckland, in 1865. Her father, Robert William Weston, was a Scottish agriculturalist, who immigrated to New Zealand from New South Wales in the 1860s and became one of Whangārei's pioneer settlers. He wrote articles on agriculture for The Daily Southern Cross and Auckland Weekly News. He died of a heart attack in October 1866. Weston grew up in Auckland with her mother, Isabella Weston, and attended Wellesley Street School, where she became a pupil teacher. She would later describe her early life as being beset by "worries, disappointments and struggles".

Weston's first short stories were published in newspapers at age 15, and she began writing her first novel at age 20. While in the process of writing it, she travelled from New Zealand to London via the United States and Canada; she would later write that she saw the United States as suffering from widespread corruption and an unfortunate history of poor treatment of "inferior races".

== Ko Meri ==
On reaching London, Weston sought a publisher for her novel, and it was published in 1890 by the British firm of Eden, Remington & Co under the title Ko Méri, or, A Cycle of Cathay: A Story of New Zealand Life (also known as Ko Meri).

Ko Meri featured a relationship between a half-Māori half-Pākehā woman named Mary Belmain and an Englishman. It reflected a widespread belief at the time that Māori people would die out after European contact. When the Englishman is killed, Belmain returns to her mother's family's pā, saying: "The night that has fallen upon my race has fallen upon me, and it is well that I should share the darkness with my own people." Like other colonial writers at the time, particularly those part of the Māoriland movement, Weston was inspired by and adopted Māori traditions and legends. Joan Stevens said in 1966 that the belief that the Māori people were doomed enabled Weston to "dignify the Maori in fiction by giving him tragic stature".

Contemporary reviews were generally positive. New Zealand newspaper The Observer said of the book that "in addition to being very entertaining to New Zealand people will be useful to friends in the old country who wish to obtain a correct idea of life in Auckland ... Miss Weston's pictures of domestic and social life, language and manners are quite perfect." It criticised the book, however, for describing how "the sun sank to the cone of Rangitoto", being "a direction in which no mortal [Aucklander] ever saw the sun sinking". The Taranaki Herald praised the novel and said "the story throughout indicates the hand of an observant, conscientious and fluent writer". The New Zealand Herald similarly felt that Weston had "woven the materials at her command with considerable skill".

British newspapers such as The Graphic and The Morning Post praised the novel for its exotic setting and realistic depiction of Māori. Weston also sent a copy to William Gladstone, then the prime minister of the United Kingdom, who wrote in response: "There are few subjects of more interest than the present relations of the aboriginal peoples to creation. I think you have rendered a real service by the exhibition of a very curious portion of the subject."

By contrast, The Press was dissatisfied with the lead character's return to the "condition of the primitive Maori", suggesting "it is difficult to conceive such a civilised creature as the heroine 'going back', except under stress of madness", and concluded that "one cannot commend [the book] for any special merit".

== Journalism and later life ==
Weston remained in London after her novel's publication, and decided to become a journalist. She found it difficult to obtain work until the Jameson Raid took place in South Africa over the New Year weekend of 1895–96, at which point she had an article on the subject accepted by William Ernest Henley, then editor of the New Review magazine. She began using the pseudonym C. de Thierry, and later said she had written for the magazine for 18 months before Henley discovered that she was a woman. She said Henley "was greatly surprised and amused, as from the articles of 'C. de Thierry' he concluded his contributor was of the sterner sex". In later life, Weston said that she had encountered no sexism in her journalistic career.

Weston was a keen imperialist and her work reflected these views. A collection of her articles was published as Imperialism in 1898 by Duckworth and Company, with a preface written by Henley. It was dedicated to the Primrose League, a conservative lobby group. Weston argued for a symbiotic and supportive relationship between the imperial Great Britain and its colonies, with each having an important role and without any suggestion of colonial inferiority.

For over twenty years she contributed articles on political, military and literary topics to other newspapers and magazines such as The Cornhill Magazine, The United Service Magazine, The Broad Arrow, The Globe and The English Illustrated Magazine. She also advocated for the Tariff Reform League, and gave talks to organisations such as the Royal Colonial Institute. She was described in a 1913 article as being "small and quiet and reserved, but ... gifted with an immense amount of fiery energy and vitality". Constance Barnicoat said of her: "Over her well-known non de plume brilliant and sometimes vitriolic articles frequently appear, even in the pages of the most exclusive magazines". Weston's mother, who lived with her in London for many years, died in March 1914.

On 7 February 1923, Weston was married in Adelaide to a man from Melbourne with the last name Campbell. In 1933, she returned to New Zealand for the first time in thirty-three years. She recorded her impressions of Whangārei for The Northern Advocate, and expressed her appreciation of the town's progress and beauty. She died on 21 May 1939 in Chelsea, London, England, aged 74.
