= Golden Bay County =

Former county of New Zealand

Coordinates: 40°40′38″S 172°40′58″E

- County of New Zealand
- 1956–1989
- History
  - Established: 1956
  - Disestablished: 1989
- Today part of: Tasman District

Golden Bay County was one of the counties of New Zealand on the South Island.

During the period 1853 to 1876, the area that would become Golden Bay County was administered as part of Nelson Province. With the Abolition of Provinces Act 1876, the areas bordering Golden Bay (an arm of the Tasman Sea) were placed under the administration of newly formed Collingwood County, effective 1 January 1877.

In 1903, the New Zealand Government voted to reduce the size of Collingwood County to just its western Aorere region, with the remaining eastern region being constituted as Takaka County, effective April 1904. The two counties were re-amalgamated in 1956 to form Golden Bay County.

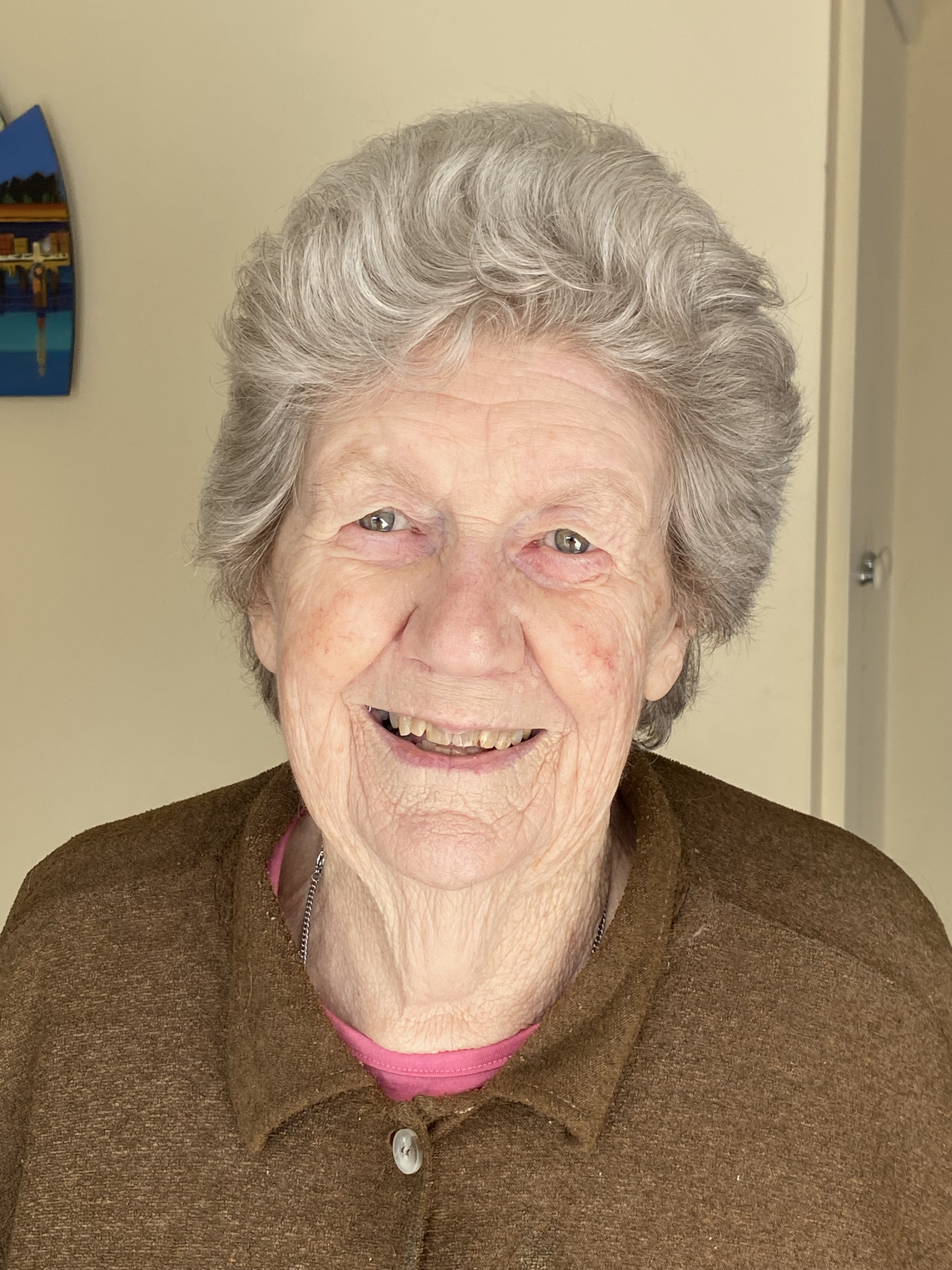
Ann Lewis in 2025

Golden Bay County existed until the 1989 local government reforms, when the Tasman District was formed through the amalgamation of Murchison County, Waimea County and Richmond Borough administrative areas in circa April 1989. Golden Bay County joined Tasman District on 1 November 1989.

Chairpersons included Rodney Nees and Philip Woollaston. The last chairperson of Golden Bay County Council was Ann Lewis, who was first elected to the council in the 1980 local elections, and was chair for the final term from 1986 to 1989.
