= Nelson Province =

- Provinces of New Zealand
- Nelson Province as constituted in 1853

- Seal
- Motto: Palmam qui meruit ferat (Latin); Let him, who has earned it, bear the palm
- Interactive map of Nelson Province
- Coordinates: 41°16′15″S 173°17′2″E
- Country: New Zealand
- Provinces of New Zealand: Nelson Province
- Founded: 1853
- Abolished: 1876
- Named for: Horatio Nelson
- Seat: Nelson
- Demonym: Nelsonian
- Time zone: UTC+12 (NZST)
  - Summer (DST): UTC+13 (NZDT)

Nelson Province was constituted in 1853 under the New Zealand Constitution Act 1852, and originally covered the entire upper South Island, including all of present-day Buller, Kaikoura, Marlborough, and Tasman districts, along with Nelson City, Grey District north of the Grey River, and the Hurunui District north of the Hurunui River. It was reduced in size by Marlborough Province splitting off in November 1859. It was abolished in 1876, along with all the provinces of New Zealand.

== Area ==
Map showing Nelson Province after Marlborough Province split off in 1859

Nelson Province initially covered the entire upper South Island. Marlborough Province split off from Nelson Province on 1 November 1859 because the majority of the income of the provincial council came from land sales in the Marlborough region, but the funds were mostly used in the Nelson region. Land sales in Nelson and Marlborough netted the Nelson Provincial Council £33,000 and £160,000, respectively. Of that, £200 was expended benefiting the Marlborough region. There was considerable conflict between Superintendent John Perry Robinson's policies of supporting smaller landholders, and the objectives of the large pastoral runholders in the Wairau Valley. The New Provinces Act 1858 allowed for parts of a province to break away if the area was large enough, and enough voters supported such a move. The petition was signed by almost all settlers in the Wairau; only six withholding their support for a split. Marlborough Province was gazetted on 4 October 1859.

== History ==
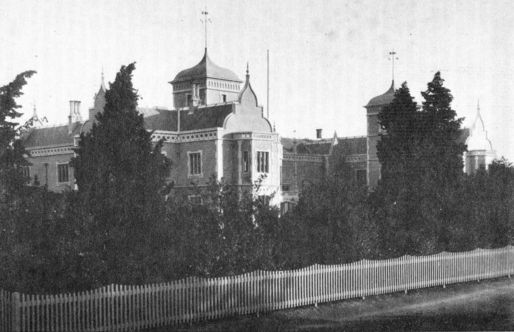
Nelson Provincial Council buildings

The Nelson Provincial Council was established with fifteen members, and the province was divided into electoral districts for the election of the Superintendent and members of the council. The seven districts were: Town of Nelson, five members; Suburban Districts, one member; Waimea East District, two members; Waimea West District, one member; Waimea South District, two members; Motueka and Massacre Bay District, two members; Wairau District, two members.

Three candidates, Edward Stafford, Francis Jollie and John Waring Saxton, ran for election as Nelson's first superintendent on 1 August 1853. Stafford won, with vote counts being: Stafford (251), Saxton (206), Jollie (130). Stafford is remembered for his free, secular and compulsory education system that became the model for New Zealand, with this 'Nelson system' introduced to all state primary schools in 1877.

Nelson was the designated seat of government and Superintendent John Perry Robinson laid the foundation stone for the Provincial Government buildings in Nelson on 26 August 1859. The building was in Albion Square in Bridge Street. It was designed by visiting architect Maxwell Bury and modeled on Aston Hall near Birmingham, although the Government buildings were built in timber, whereas Aston Hall was in stone. When the buildings were demolished in 1969, amidst much controversy, they were run down and had stood empty for some years. The Nelson District Court building now stands on the site.

During the First Taranaki War in 1860 nearly 1,200 Taranaki settlers, including women and children, were relocated to Nelson. The Nelson Provincial Council funded the building of cottages known as the "Taranaki Buildings" to house them. Upon the cessation of hostilities the war refugees were offered free passage back to Taranaki. The majority took up the offer, but some chose to remain in Nelson.

From 1853 to 1873, the area that would later become Grey County was partly in Nelson Province and partly in Canterbury Province. The boundary between the provinces had been set as a straight line from the head of the Hurunui River to Lake Brunner at a time when the area was virtually uninhabited. The West Coast gold rush of the 1860s straddled that boundary, with a population boom also straddling the boundary. In 1866, there had been a proposal for the portion in Canterbury Province, including the urban area of Greymouth and the rural area south, to be annexed and solely administered by Nelson Province. The Canterbury portion was transferred to a newly created Westland Province in 1873 and the other portion remained in Nelson Province until the abolition of the provinces in 1876.

=== Abolition ===
Nelson Province was abolished under the Abolition of Provinces Act 1875, with its former area then being administered by a number of newly constituted boroughs and counties, effective 1 January 1877.

Borough / County	Established	Disestablished	Area	Headquarters	Notes
Amuri County	1876	1989	11,000 km^{2}	Culverden	Merged into Hurunui District
Buller County	1876	1989	15,000 km^{2}	Westport	Merged into Buller District
Cheviot County	1876	1989	847.28 km^{2}	Cheviot	Merged into Hurunui District
Collingwood County	1876	1956			In 1903, the New Zealand Government voted to reduce the original Collingwood County to its western Aorere area, with the eastern area being constituted as Takaka County, effective April 1904. The two counties were re-amalgamated in 1956 to form Golden Bay County, which merged into Tasman District in 1989.
Grey County	1876	1989	4,091 km^{2}	Greymouth	Merged, along with Greymouth Borough, to form Grey District
Inangahua County	1876	1989	2,440.8 km^{2}	Reefton	Merged into Buller District
Motueka Borough	1900	1989	47.9 km^{2}	Motueka	Merged into Tasman District
Murchison County	1 April 1909	1989		Murchison	Merged into Tasman District
Richmond Borough	1891	1989	10.52 km^{2}	Richmond	Merged into Tasman District
Takaka County	1904	1956		Takaka	Created from eastern portion of original area of Collingwood County in 1904. Re-amalgamated with Collingwood County to form Golden Bay County, which merged into Tasman District in 1989.
Waimea County	1876	1989	7,547 km^{2}	Richmond	Merged into Tasman District
Westport Borough	1873	1989	3.44 km^{2}	Westport	Merged into Buller District

== Demographics ==
In 1851 the statistics of the area that was to become the Nelson Province was 4,587 and by 1869 it had a population of 22,501.

== Anniversary day ==
New Zealand law provides for a provincial anniversary day.

Provincial district	includes	Actual day	Observance day
Nelson	Nelson, Tasman, Buller and parts of North Canterbury	1 February	Monday nearest to the actual day

== Superintendents ==
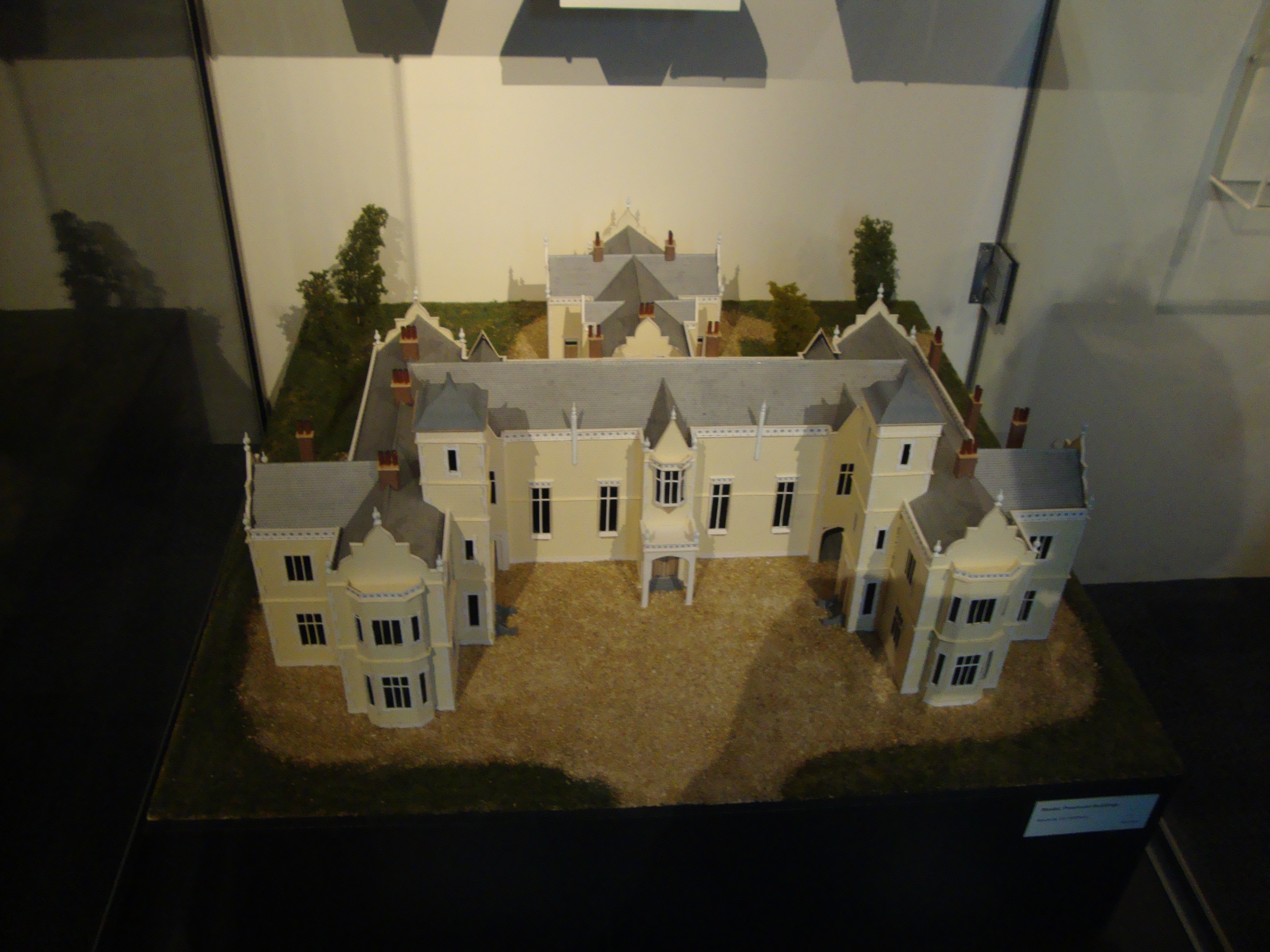
Model of the Nelson Provincial Government building on display in the Nelson Provincial Museum (building existed 1859–1969)

Nelson Province had four superintendents:

No.	from	to	Superintendent
1	1 August 1853	Sep 1856	Edward Stafford
2	12 December 1856	28 January 1865	John Perry Robinson
3	Mar 1865	4 February 1867	Alfred Saunders
4	Apr 1867	1 January 1877	Oswald Curtis

== Elected members ==
Name	From	To	Electorate
Acton Adams	1873	1876	Nelson
John Barnicoat	1853	1861	
William Cautley	1853	1854	Waimea
Oswald Curtis	1857	1867	
Nathaniel Edwards	1868	1869	Nelson
Nathaniel Edwards	1875	1876	Nelson
George Horne	1868	1869	Grey
Joseph Ivess	21 January 1873	31 October 1876	Inangahua
Carl Friederich Christian Kelling	1862	1869	Moutere
Carl Friederich Christian Kelling	1869	1873	Waimea West
Fedor Kelling	1857	1876	Waimea East
David Luckie	1869	1873	
James Mackay	1857	1861	Nelson
Charles Parker	1853	1857	Motueka and Massacre Bay
Albert Pitt	1867	1876	Nelson
Richard Reeves	28 April 1876	31 October 1876	Grey
James Crowe Richmond			
John Perry Robinson	1853	1865	Motueka and Massacre Bay
William Robinson	5 October 1857	2 April 1859	Amuri
Andrew Rutherford	1869	1871	Amuri
Alfred Saunders	1855	1865	Waimea East
John Sharp			Waimea East
John Sharp			Amuri
Edward Stafford	1 August 1853	September 1856	
Samuel Stephens	19 June 1854	26 June 1855	Town of Nelson
William Travers	1853	1854	Town of Nelson
Thomas Henry Wigley			

== Legislation ==
- Nelson Education Act 1856
- Nelson Improvement Act 1856
- Nelson Institution Act 1859
- Nelson Waterworks Act 1863
- Nelson Waterworks Act Amendment Act 1875

== Subordinate boards ==
- Nelson Central Board of Education
- Nelson Board of Works

== See also ==
- Nelson-Marlborough Regional Council
