= New Zealand Energy Limited =

New Zealand electricity generator company

New Zealand Energy
- Industry: Energy
- Headquarters: Motueka, New Zealand
- Area served: Nelson; Tasman Region
- Website: www.nzenergy.co.nz

New Zealand Energy is a New Zealand electricity generation energy retailer company, servicing the Nelson and Tasman Regions of the country.

The company is based in Motueka, and generates their renewable hydro and solar electricity locally within the Nelson and Tasman Regions by operating small hydroelectric power stations in Haast, Fox, Ōpunake and Raetihi.

== Power stations ==
In August 2008, NZ Energy proposed to build a 4.6 MW hydroelectric scheme at Lake Matiri near Murchison, Nelson. They gained the necessary resource consent in 2009, and Department of Conservation (DOC) concession in 2011, required to build, own, operate and maintain the scheme. Pioneer Energy purchased the development rights in 2014, and construction of the scheme began in 2018. While the Matiri hydro scheme was expected to be operational by the end of 2019, the construction was delayed by a slip on the Matiri West Bank Road near Murchison in August 2019, and the ongoing COVID-19 pandemic. The scheme officially opened in December 2020, capable of generating 28 GWh annually - enough to power just under 4000 homes.

In 2023, the company applied for consent to build a second hydro power station on the Turnbull River, to increase the supply to the Haast region.
