= Lake Matiri =

Lake in New Zealand

- Location within South Island
- Location: South Island
- Coordinates: 41°39′S 172°20′E
- Primary inflows: Matiri River
- Primary outflows: Matiri River
- Basin countries: New Zealand
- Frozen: No
- Islands: None
- Settlements: Murchison

Lake Matiri is a lake adjoining Kahurangi National Park in the northwest corner of New Zealand's South Island. The lake is part of the Matiri River.

== Hydroelectric power scheme ==
Pioneer Energy Ltd purchased the Matiri Project from New Zealand Energy in 2014 and has now commenced construction of a hydroelectric power scheme on the lake outflow.

== See also ==
- List of lakes in New Zealand
