= Richmond, Tasman =

Town in Tasman District, New Zealand

Richmond Waimea
- Town
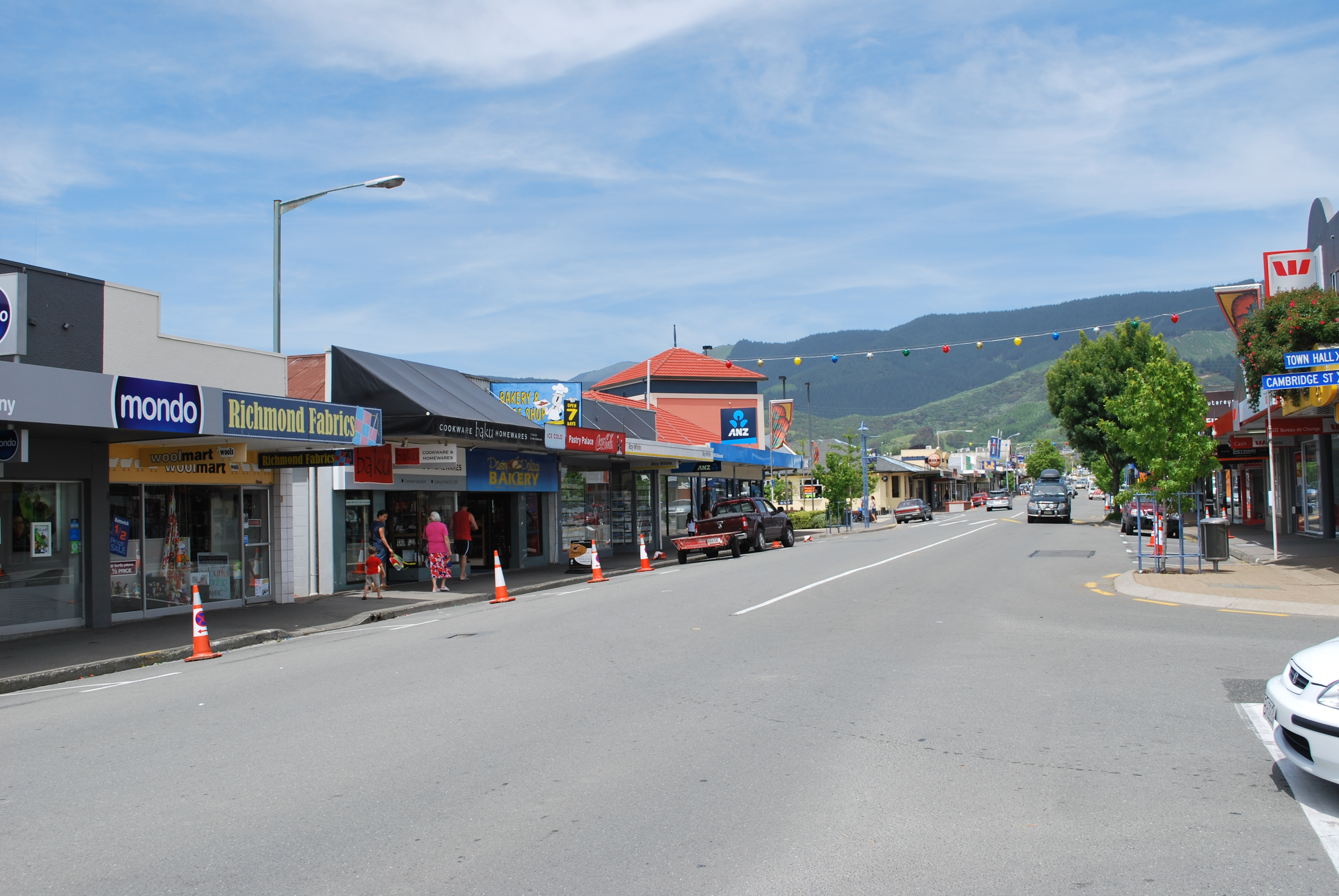
- Queen Street, the main street of Richmond in New Zealand (as of 2011)
- Interactive map of Richmond
- Coordinates: 41°20′S 173°11′E
- Country: New Zealand
- Territorial authority: Tasman
- Ward: Richmond Ward
- Founded: 1854
- Electorates: Nelson; Te Tai Tonga (Māori)

Government
  - Territorial Authority: Tasman District Council
  - Mayor of Tasman: Tim King
  - Nelson MP: Rachel Boyack
  - Te Tai Tonga MP: Tākuta Ferris

Area
  - Total: 17.55 km^{2} (6.78 sq mi)

Population (June 2025)
  - Total: 19,950
  - Density: 1,137/km^{2} (2,944/sq mi)
- Postcode(s): 7020
- Area code: 03

Richmond (Māori: Waimea), originally known as Waimea East, is a town and the seat of the Tasman District Council in New Zealand. It lies 13 kilometres (8 mi) south of Nelson in the South Island, close to the southern extremity of Tasman Bay. The town, first settled by Europeans in 1842, was named in 1854 after the town of Richmond on Thames near London. The town has an estimated population of 19,950 as of June 2025.

Although most of Richmond lies outside the boundaries of Nelson City and the town is considered a separate urban area, Richmond is part of the wider Nelson metropolitan area along with nearby Brightwater, Hope, Māpua and Wakefield. The two unitary authorities (Nelson and Tasman) co-operate for tourism-marketing purposes via "Latitude Nelson". As of 2020 Richmond forms part of the Nelson parliamentary electorate.

== History ==
When the area was first settled, it was known as Waimea East.

During the period 1853 to 1876, the Richmond urban area was administered as part of Nelson Province. With the Abolition of Provinces Act 1876, Waimea County was created, effective in January 1877. Richmond was included in the Waimea County boundaries, and served as the administrative headquarters of the county.

In 1891, the administrative authority for the urban area of Richmond was transferred from Waimea County to the Richmond Borough Council.

Richmond Borough existed until the 1989 local government reforms, when the Tasman District was formed through the amalgamation of the Richmond Borough, Golden Bay County, Murchison County and Waimea County administrative areas.

== Demographics ==
Stats NZ describes Richmond as a medium urban area, which covers 17.55 km^{2} (6.78 sq mi). It incorporates nine statistical areas. The Daelyn statistical area, covering 1.47 km^{2} (0.57 sq mi), is the sole area of Richmond within Nelson City; the remaining eight areas are within Tasman District. It had an estimated population of 19,950 as of June 2025, with a population density of 1,137 people per km^{2}.

Historical population
Year	Pop.	±% p.a.
2006	12,420	—
2013	13,473	+1.17%
2018	15,378	+2.68%
2023	18,447	+3.71%
The 2006 population is for a smaller area of 17.37 km^{2}. Source:

Richmond had a population of 18,447 in the 2023 New Zealand census, an increase of 3,069 people (20.0%) since the 2018 census, and an increase of 4,974 people (36.9%) since the 2013 census. There were 8,841 males, 9,546 females, and 60 people of other genders in 7,266 dwellings. 2.3% of people identified as LGBTIQ+. The median age was 45.6 years (compared with 38.1 years nationally). There were 3,069 people (16.6%) aged under 15 years, 3,000 (16.3%) aged 15 to 29, 7,689 (41.7%) aged 30 to 64, and 4,692 (25.4%) aged 65 or older.

People could identify as more than one ethnicity. The results were 90.2% European (Pākehā); 8.5% Māori; 1.9% Pasifika; 6.0% Asian; 0.8% Middle Eastern, Latin American and African New Zealanders (MELAA); and 2.7% other, which includes people giving their ethnicity as "New Zealander". English was spoken by 97.6%, Māori by 1.5%, Samoan by 0.2%, and other languages by 8.9%. No language could be spoken by 1.6% (e.g. too young to talk). New Zealand Sign Language was known by 0.5%. The percentage of people born overseas was 20.1, compared with 28.8% nationally.

Religious affiliations were 32.4% Christian, 0.7% Hindu, 0.3% Islam, 0.1% Māori religious beliefs, 1.2% Buddhist, 0.4% New Age, 0.1% Jewish, and 0.9% other religions. People who answered that they had no religion were 56.2%, and 7.9% of people did not answer the census question.

Of those at least 15 years old, 3,045 (19.8%) people had a bachelor's or higher degree, 8,667 (56.4%) had a post-high school certificate or diploma, and 3,660 (23.8%) people exclusively held high school qualifications. The median income was $38,200, compared with $41,500 nationally. 1,530 people (9.9%) earned over $100,000 compared to 12.1% nationally. The employment status of those at least 15 was 7,074 (46.0%) full-time, 2,232 (14.5%) part-time, and 270 (1.8%) unemployed.

Individual statistical areas
Name	Area (km^{2})	Population	Density (per km^{2})	Dwellings	Median age	Median income
Richmond West	6.46	2,853	442	1,233	41.7 years	$40,400
Richmond Central	1.15	1,920	1,670	780	37.2 years	$36,100
Ben Cooper Park	0.92	2,400	2,609	960	42.1 years	$37,600
Richmond South	2.69	1,044	388	384	46.1 years	$42,800
Wilkes Park	0.88	2,289	2,601	873	46.5 years	$41,600
Templemore	1.43	2,040	1,427	729	51.4 years	$37,700
Easby Park	1.13	2,754	2,437	996	37.5 years	$39,600
Fairose	1.42	1,815	1,278	789	58.9 years	$35,500
Daelyn	1.47	1,332	906	522	53.9 years	$30,500
New Zealand					38.1 years	$41,500

== Economy ==
=== Richmond Mall ===
Richmond Mall opened on 2 October 1973. It covers an area of 23,142 m^{2} and has 800 carparks and 70 stores, including Farmers and Pak'nSave.

== Education ==
=== General public schools ===
Waimea College is a co-educational state secondary school for Year 9 to 13 students, with a roll of 1,526 as of July 2026. It opened in 1957.

Waimea Intermediate is a co-educational state intermediate school for Year 7 to 8 students, with a roll of 550. It opened in 1959.

There are two state primary schools for Year 1 to 6 students:

- Richmond School, with a roll of 500 It opened in 1856 as Richmond Primary School. It was structured as separate Boys' and Girls' schools, which combined in 1904.
- Henley School, with a roll of 483 It opened in 1962.

In addition, there is a primary school at Appleby

=== Specialist schools ===
Salisbury School is a state school for Year 3 to 10 girls with complex learning needs, with a roll of 12. It was established on 1916, on a homestead established by William McRae in 1850.

Te Kura Kaupapa Māori o Tuia Te Matangi is a co-educational state Māori language immersion school for Year 1 to 13 students, with a roll of 48. It opened in 2004.

=== Roman Catholic schools ===
Garin College is a co-educational state-integrated Catholic school for Year 9 to 13 students, with a roll of 634. It opened in 2002.

St Paul's School is a co-educational state-integrated Catholic school for Year 1 to 8 students, with a roll of 362. It opened in 1999.

== Sport ==
Nelson Speedway is a motorcycle speedway, approximately 4 kilometres to the north on Lansdowne Road, off Lower Queen Street. The track races various types of cars, such as stock cars, superstocks, midgets, sprint cars, sidecars and saloons. It was a significant venue for motorcycle speedway events, including qualifying rounds of the Speedway World Championship, (the first in 1988).

== Climate ==
Climate data for Richmond (1991–2020)
Month	Jan	Feb	Mar	Apr	May	Jun	Jul	Aug	Sep	Oct	Nov	Dec	Year
Mean daily maximum °C (°F)	23.1 (73.6)	23.0 (73.4)	21.5 (70.7)	18.6 (65.5)	16.0 (60.8)	13.5 (56.3)	12.9 (55.2)	13.7 (56.7)	15.6 (60.1)	17.7 (63.9)	19.4 (66.9)	21.3 (70.3)	18.0 (64.5)
Daily mean °C (°F)	18.1 (64.6)	17.9 (64.2)	16.3 (61.3)	13.4 (56.1)	10.7 (51.3)	8.1 (46.6)	7.3 (45.1)	8.6 (47.5)	10.5 (50.9)	12.7 (54.9)	14.3 (57.7)	16.6 (61.9)	12.9 (55.2)
Mean daily minimum °C (°F)	13.0 (55.4)	12.8 (55.0)	11.0 (51.8)	8.2 (46.8)	5.4 (41.7)	2.7 (36.9)	1.7 (35.1)	3.4 (38.1)	5.3 (41.5)	7.6 (45.7)	9.1 (48.4)	11.8 (53.2)	7.7 (45.8)
Source: NIWA

== Gallery ==
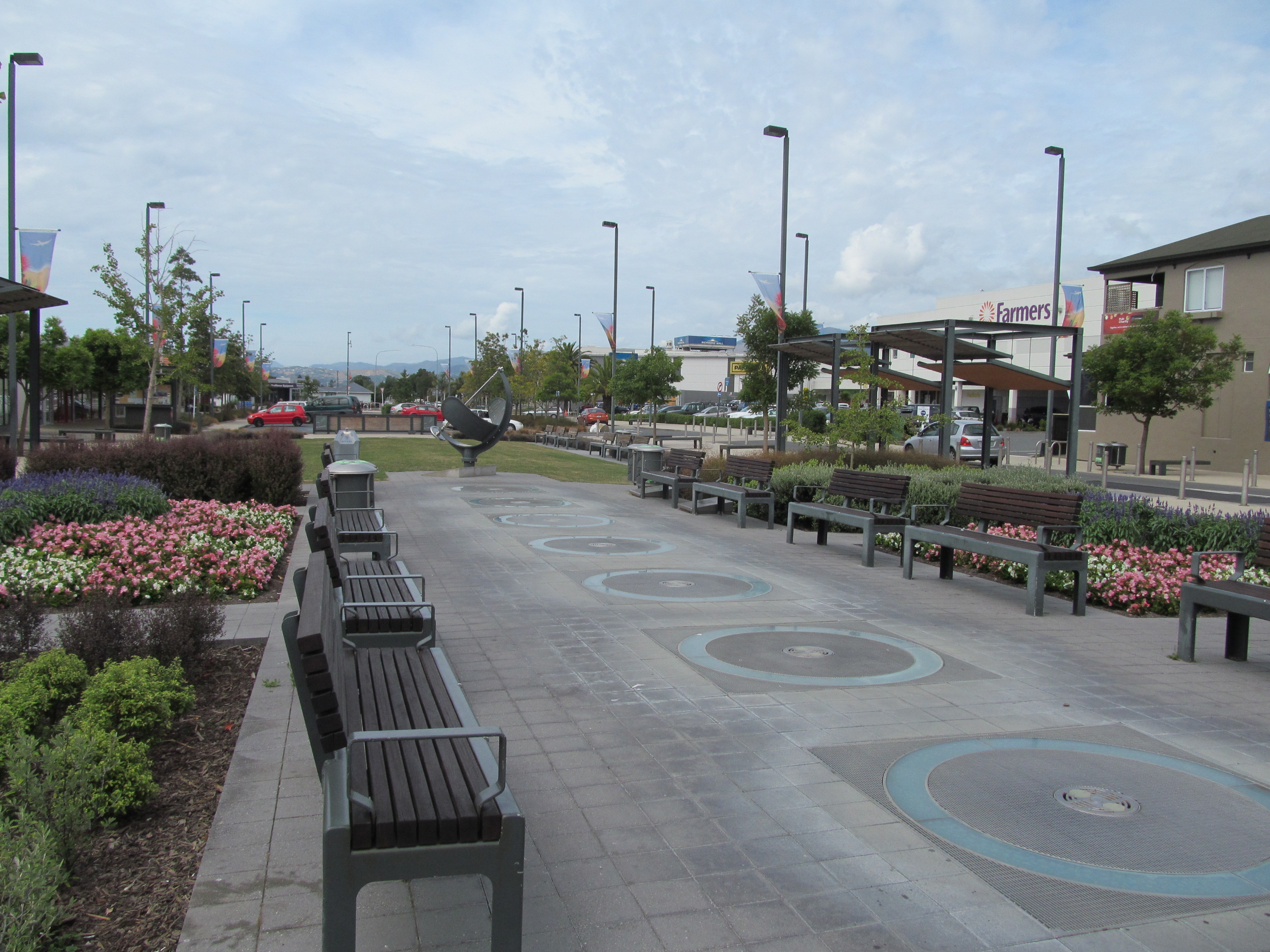
Sundial Square in central Richmond, New Zealand. The sundial in view was unveiled in 1994 and weighs 800 kilograms.

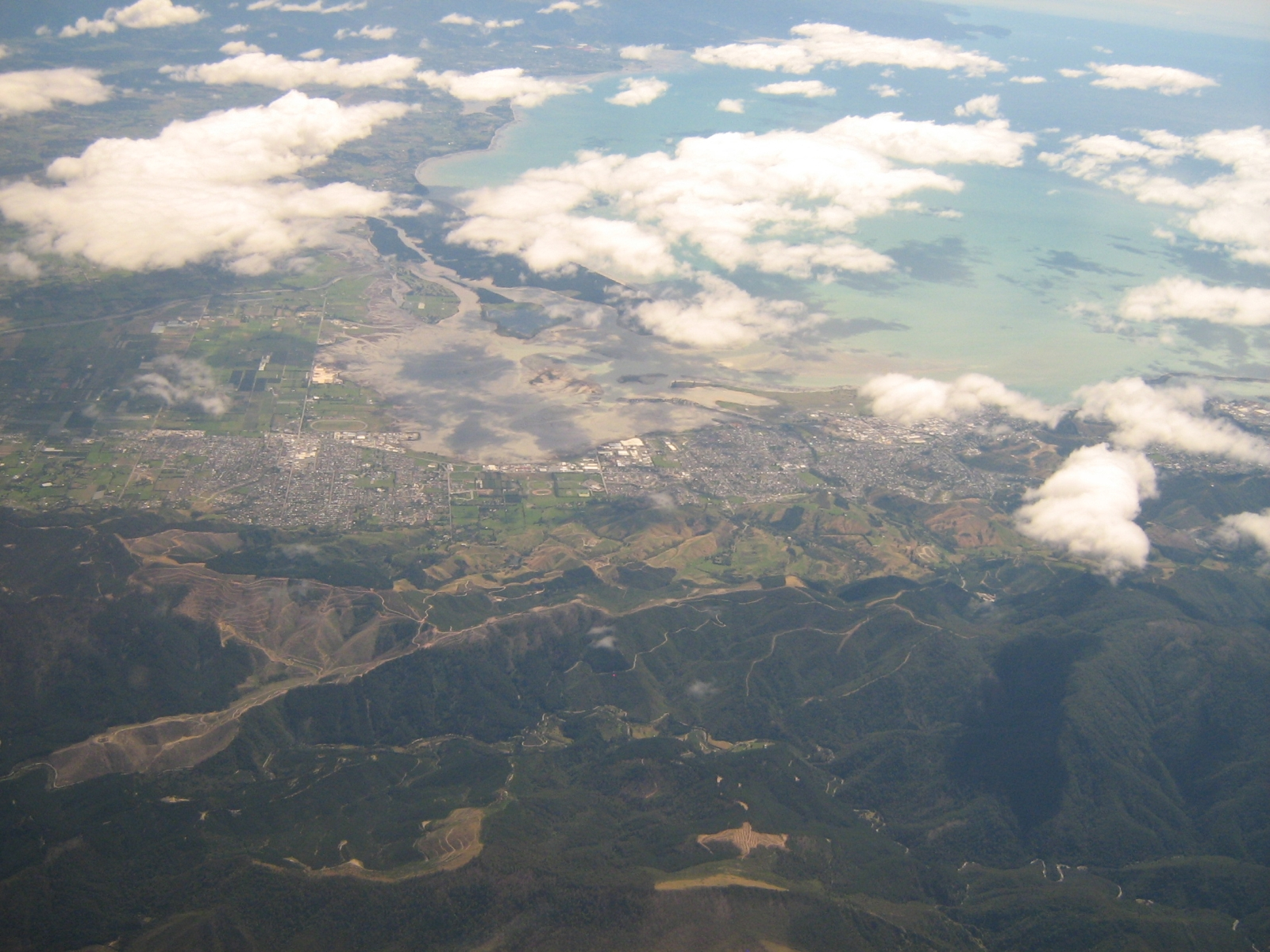
Richmond seen from the air, showing its close connection to Nelson at the right

== See also ==
- Nelson
- Tasman District
- Hope
- Brightwater
- Wakefield
