= Takaka County =

Former New Zealand county in the South Island

Coordinates: 40°51′15″S 172°48′25″E

- County of New Zealand
- 1904–1956
- Capital: Tākaka
- History
  - Established: 1904
  - Disestablished: 1956
- Today part of: Tasman District

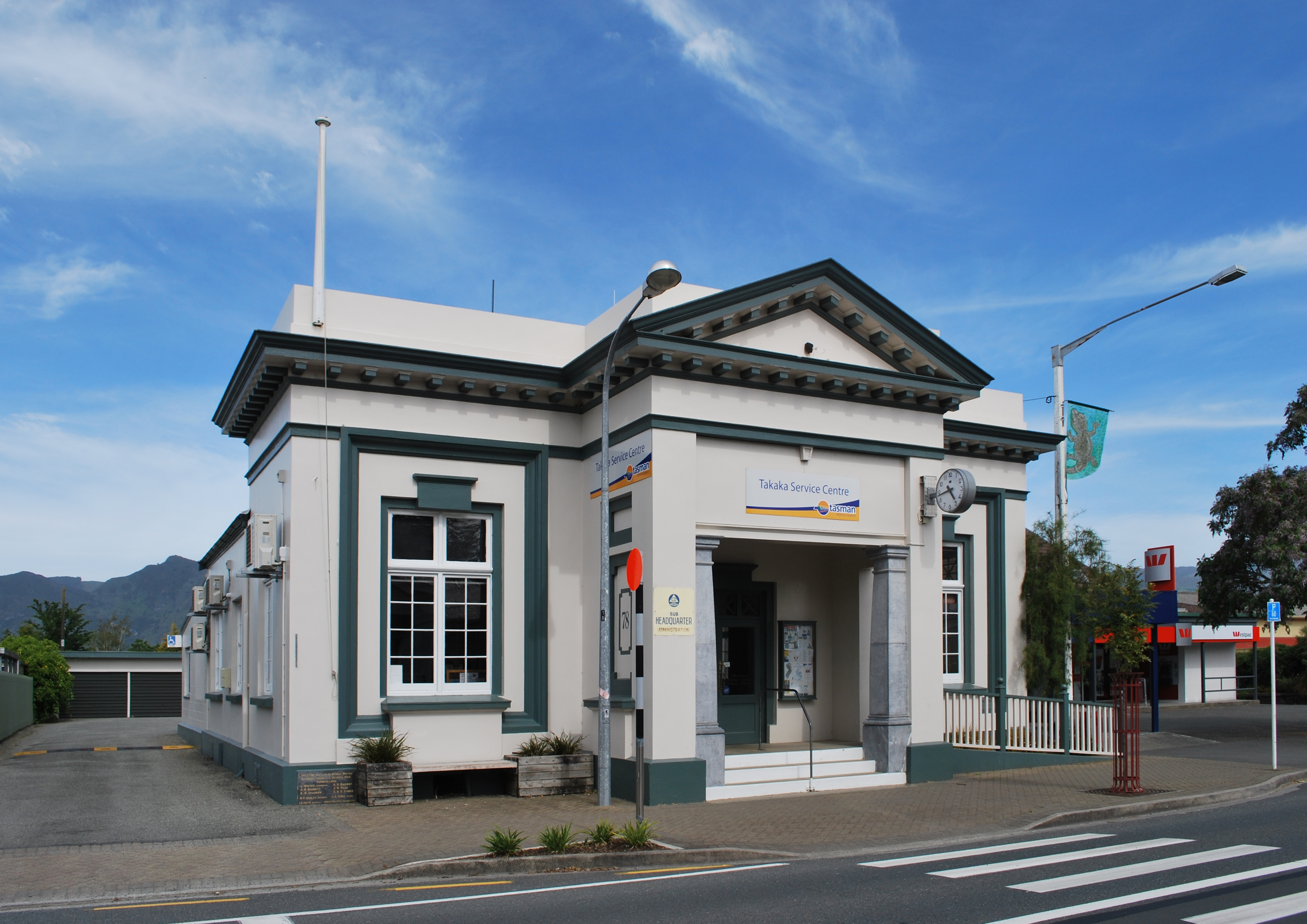
Tasman Region service centre at Takaka, New Zealand

Takaka County was one of the counties of New Zealand in the South Island.

During the period 1853 to 1876, the area that would become Takaka County was administered as part of Nelson Province. With the Abolition of Provinces Act 1876, the areas bordering Golden Bay (an arm of the Tasman Sea) were placed under the administration of the newly formed Collingwood County, effective 1 January 1877.

In 1903, the Government of New Zealand voted to reduce the size of Collingwood County to just its western Aorere region, with the remaining eastern region being constituted as Takaka County, effective April 1904. The county council's administrative headquarters was located in Tākaka.

Takaka County existed until 1956, when it re-amalgamated with Collingwood County to form Golden Bay County. Golden Bay County existed until the 1989 local government reforms, when it was amalgamated into the new Tasman District.
