= Murchison County, New Zealand =

Former county of New Zealand

Coordinates: 41°48′S 172°20′E

Murchison County
- County of New Zealand
- 1 April 1909–31 March 1965
- Capital: Murchison
- Area
  - 1964: 3,553 km^{2} (1,372 sq mi)
- Population
  - 1964: 1,460
- History
  - Established: 1 April 1909
  - Disestablished: 31 March 1965
- Today part of: Tasman District

Murchison County was one of the counties of New Zealand on the South Island, existing from 1909 to 1965.

== History ==
During the period 1853 to 1876, the area that would become Murchison County was administered as part of Nelson Province. With the abolition of provinces in 1876, the area became the Hampden Riding of Inangahua County.

== Formation ==
The foundational document for Murchison County was the Murchison County Act 1908, which created the new county out of Hampden Riding. This act came into force on 1 April 1909; the precise boundaries of the county are set out in the First Schedule of the Act. The county council's administrative headquarters was located in the county's largest town, Murchison.

== Abolition ==
Murchison County was abolished, and merged with Waimea County by an Order in Council issued by then-Governor General Bernard Fergusson, Baron Ballantrae, on 31 March 1965. Technically, this order abolished both counties, and created a new Waimea County covering both regions.

In the 1989 New Zealand local government reforms, the former Murchison County, along with most of Waimea County, became part of the newly-formed Tasman District.

== Demographics ==
The 1911 New Zealand census recorded a population of 1,014 in Murchison County. Also, 4,824 cattle and 33,727 sheep.

In 1964, an estimated population of 1,460 was spread over an area of 1,372 square miles (3,550 km^{2}).
