= Appleby railway station, Tasman District =

Defunct railway station in New Zealand

Appleby

General information
- Location: State Highway 60, Tasman District
- Coordinates: 41°20′37.72″S 173°9′57.68″E
- System: New Zealand Government Railways Department regional rail
- Owner: Railways Department
- Line: Nelson Section
- Platforms: None
- Tracks: 1 main line, 1 siding

History
- Opened: 29 January 1876
- Closed: 3 September 1955
Location

Appleby railway station was a rural railway station between the towns of Richmond and Hope in the Tasman district of New Zealand's South Island, and was located on State Highway 60, otherwise known as Appleby Highway. The settlement of Appleby was actually located some distance from the railway, but Appleby station was the closest station to its namesake settlement. It was one of 25 stations on the Nelson Section, and existed from 1876 to 1955.

Facilities at this station included a small wooden passenger shelter, a goods shed and a siding to serve it.

== History ==
The first section of the Nelson Section to be built was from Stoke to Foxhill, as the route for this part of the line was the first to be confirmed while the route out of Nelson was still being debated. This included the construction of the Appleby railway station, which was opened along with the first completed section from Nelson to Foxhill on 29 January 1876.

Because this station did not have a direct connection with a neighbouring settlement, it was always considered to be a small station of lesser importance, though it did attract some regular traffic such as school students from the surrounding rural districts who commuted into Nelson to attend secondary school.

One of Appleby's few claims to fame is that it was located beside one of only two road overbridges on the entire Nelson Section which carried State Highway 60 over the railway line. These overbridges were built at the behest of the Highways Board, NZR, and the local council to improve the safety of traffic accident blackspots.

In 1949, the parlous state of the goods shed came to the attention of the Progress League in its ongoing campaign to encourage government investment in the railway. This problem was resolved shortly after being brought to the attention of the government by having the goods shed demolished.

This station was closed for three days in June 1954 until the Nelson Section was granted a reprieve, and closed permanently on 3 September 1955.

== Today ==
Remarkably, given the length of time since the railway closed, the State Highway 60 overbridge is still in use today.

== See also ==
- List of Nelson railway stations
