= Gowanbridge railway station =

Defunct railway station in New Zealand

Gowanbridge
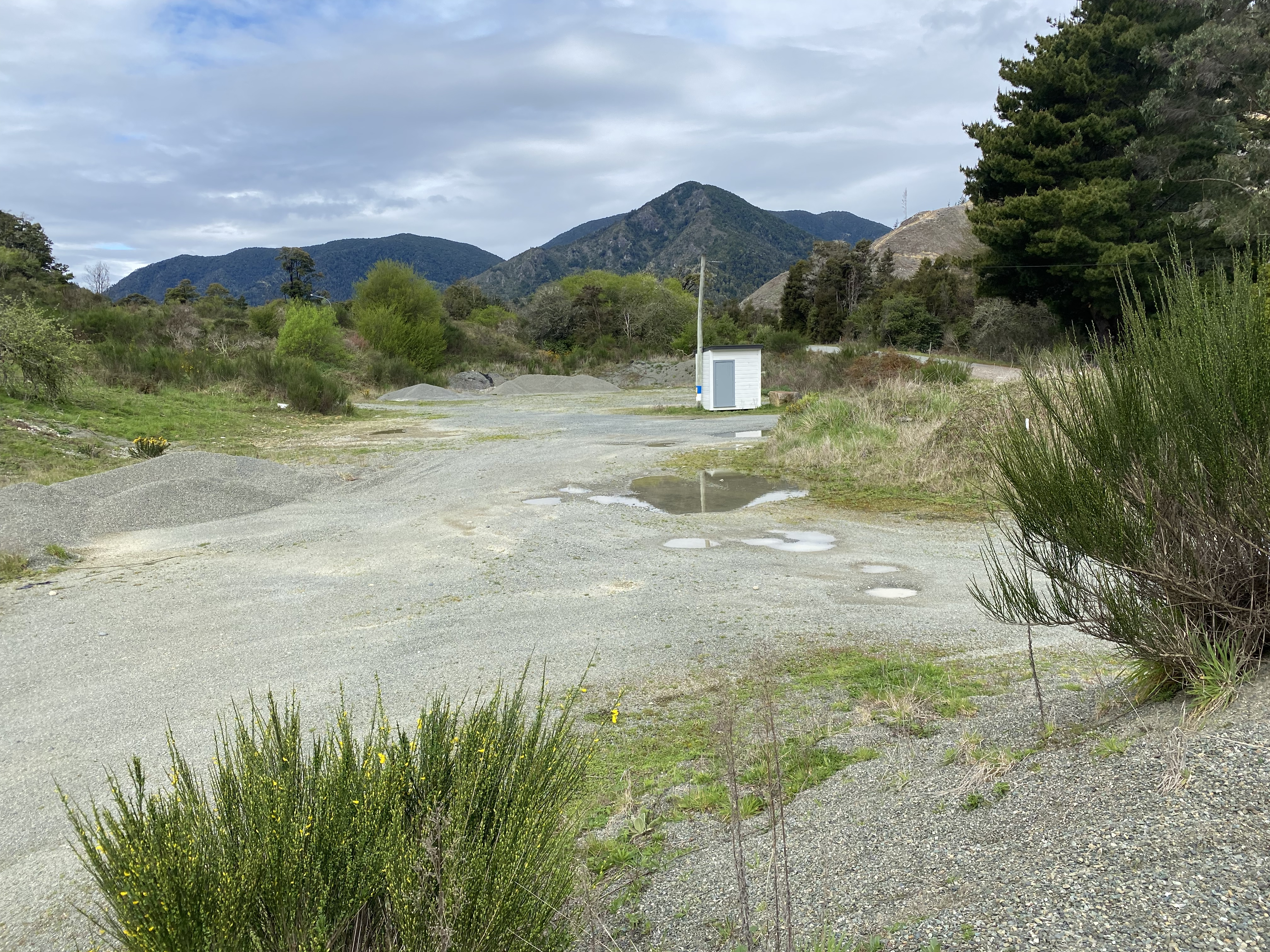
- Gowanbridge railway station

General information
- Location: State Highway 6, Gowanbridge
- Coordinates: 41°42′45.49″S 172°33′21.12″E
- Owner: Public Works Department
- Line: Nelson Section
- Platforms: Single side
- Tracks: Main line (1); Sidings (2)

Construction
- Parking: No
- Cycle facilities: No

History
- Opened: 1929
- Closed: 17 July 1931
Location

Gowanbridge railway station was a rural railway station that served the small settlement of Gowanbridge in the Tasman District of New Zealand’s South Island. Gowanbridge is located on State Highway 6 at the junction with Gowan Valley Road, and is also passed by on one side by the Buller River. It was one of 25 stations on the Nelson Section, and though completed in 1929, it never saw any revenue service nor was it ever owned or operated by the Railways Department.

Facilities at this station included a platform, stockyards, goods shed, two sidings, and a loading bank. As this was the last station on the line before construction ceased in 1931, it was also a staging point for construction crews and materials, necessitating the erection of several additional buildings for this activity.

== History ==
By 1928 formation work between Kawatiri and Gowanbridge had been completed, though a lack of enthusiasm for the project and an official rejection of a continuation of the line past Gowanbridge contributed to a reduction in the workforce down to an average of sixty. The 1928 general election in December was won by Sir Joseph Ward and the United Party, with one of their planks being to borrow £70,000,000 to fund a public works campaign, of which £10,000,000 would be set aside for railway projects. This led to renewed vigour on the construction of the Nelson Section, and by 1929 the rails had reached Gowanbridge. All of the station buildings were also completed by the end of the year.

Over the next year, Gowanbridge was a hive of activity as work progressed towards Murchison. The Gowanbridge yard was completed and materials for the construction of the line beyond Gowanbridge were brought in by Public Works Department trains and stored there pending their shipment to the railhead.

An economic depression led to the establishment of a Commission in June 1930 to review the construction and operation of NZR lines around the country. Of the Nelson Section, it reported in December 1930 that construction of the line should be one of the public works to be "suspended" which is what happened in January 1931. The line up to this point had only been open as far as Kawatiri Station, so the halt to all construction work brought a sudden end to all regular traffic through the station. Several months later on 17 July 1931 the line between Glenhope and Kawatiri was also closed.

The materials not yet used were shipped back to Nelson for use on other projects. It would be 11 years later in 1942 before the rails and sleepers beyond Glenhope were finally lifted and recovered due to the expediency of World War II and the need to use them on other projects deemed more worthy.

== Today ==
The station yard is still discernible beside State Highway 6 and is adjacent to a loop road below the highway. In the station yard can still be seen the remains of the platform and loading bank.

== See also ==
- List of Nelson railway stations
