= Brightwater (disambiguation) =

Brightwater is a town 20 kilometres southwest of Nelson in Tasman district in the South Island of New Zealand.

Brightwater may also refer to:

- Brightwater, Arkansas, United States
- Brightwater Science and Environmental Centre, a Canadian nature reserve
- Brightwater railway station, a New Zealand railway station that operated between 1876 and 1955
- Brightwater sewage treatment plant in Washington state, USA

== See also ==
- Bright Water
- Brightwaters (disambiguation)
