= List of Nelson railway stations =

This is a list of the stations that were established on the Nelson Section, an isolated 96 kilometres (60 mi) long railway in the Tasman district of New Zealand’s South Island. Most stations handled passenger traffic until passenger services were withdrawn in 1954, and most also handled freight. One, Gowanbridge, was never used in revenue service, and Kawatiri had a relatively short lifespan of only 5 years and 21 days. All stations, other than Gowanbridge and Kawatiri, were closed to passenger services on 13 June 1954, and to goods services, along with the line, on 3 September 1955.

== List ==
Station	Distance (km)	Coords	Opened	Closed	Notes
Port Nelson (Wakefield Quay)	00.00	41°15′45.1″S 173°16′13.7″E	17 May 1880	3 September 1955	Station building preserved by Nelson Railway Society. Currently located at Founders Heritage Park.
Nelson	01.61	41°16′24.5″S 173°16′36.3″E	29 January 1876 (Official Opening); 31 January 1876 (Scheduled service)	3 September 1955	Station building located near St. Vincent Street and Gloucester Street, where fire station is now located. Yards stretched to Haven Road.
Hampden St. Crossing		41°16′50.9″S 173°16′11.6″E	-		Listed in some Working Timetables as a place where the train could stop if required for school students to disembark. Not a real station.
Bishopdale, Nelson	04.67	41°17′50.1″S 173°15′49.0″E	29 January 1876	3 September 1955	Triangle bounded by Clarence Drive, Waimea Road and the cycle path/rail route. Preserved as ″Station Reserve″ by the Nelson City Council, but no remains.
Stoke	08.67	41°18′44.1″S 173°13′50.9″E	29 January 1876	3 September 1955	Immediately south of Songer Street. The exact line of the rail here is lost to housing.
Freezing Works	11.10	41°19′41.3″S 173°12′29.8″E	April 1909	3 September 1955	Sidings alongside (now) Kotua Place, stretching south from Elms Street.
Richmond	13.52	41°20′9.20″S 173°10′55.24″E	29 January 1876	3 September 1955	Located in triangle bounded by Lower Queen Street, Stratford Street, Beach Road (now Richmond Deviation)
Appleby	15.13	41°20′37.7″S 173°9′57.6″E	23 April 1895	3 September 1955	Immediately north of overbridge? Historical evidence needed.
Hope	16.74	41°21′9.4″S 173°9′8.6″E	29 January 1876	3 September 1955	From aerial photos, station was located adjacent to where the cycle trail meets Ranzau Road; the road had an overbridge over the rail line.
Brightwater	21.24	41°22′36.3″S 173°6′35.1″E	29 January 1876	3 September 1955	Railway cut diagonally through reserve next to 4 Square on Ellis street; continuing through the now-back yards of houses on Ben Nevis Cres.
Spring Grove	23.50	41°23′4.6″S 173°5′10.1″E	29 January 1876	3 September 1955	Telenius Road; there's railway crossing and station signs here. The railway alignment clearly visible on Google Earth between here and Wakefield, mostly farm tracks and tree-lines. Station building preserved by Nelson Railway Society. Renamed to "Grove Station" and located at the end of Sovereign Street.
Wakefield	27.84	41°24′19.1″S 173°2′34.8″E	29 January 1876	3 September 1955	Station area now a small reserve, parking area, section of SH6.
Wai-iti	32.19	41°25′41″S 172°59′50″E	29 January 1876	3 September 1955	Evidence of exact location needed. 4.35km from Wakefield places it 500m or so before river crossing. Rail route visible in Google Earth.
Foxhill	34.12	41°26′24″S 172°58′29″E	25 July 1881	3 September 1955	Precise location uncertain. 6.28km from Wakefield, 1.51km from Belgrove leaves a gap of about 800 metres, by Google Maps.
Belgrove	c35.63		25 July 1881	c.1890	First location of this station was about 100 metres south-west of the highway due to the original route chosen for the railway which was later changed. Station building preserved at Belgrove.
Belgrove	35.63	41°26′58.2″S 172°57′33.7″E	c.1890	3 September 1955	The second location of Belgrove station was established with the change of route from 1890. Located at the Belgove Windmill.
Motupiko	51.34	41°27′22.9″S 172°50′14.2″E	16 February 1899; 1 March 1899 (Scheduled service)	3 September 1955	Located alongside SH6, a few hundred metres south of the Kohatu junction; Aerial photos available.
Mararewa	56.49	41°24′42.6″S 172°50′20.2″E	22 October 1906	3 September 1955	Located alongside Motueka Valley Highway, adjacent to a small cemetery; Aerial photos available.
Tapawera	59.22	41°23′22.5″S 172°49′27.6″E	6 August 1906	3 September 1955	Matai Crescent and Main Road Tapawera; Aerial photos available.
Rakau	63.73	41°24′46.8″S 172°47′32.0″E	6 August 1906	3 September 1955	Relying on maps at nzrailmap.nz; historical evidence needed.
Tadmor	68.08	41°26′18.24″S 172°45′14.4″E	6 August 1906	3 September 1955	Remnants of platforms clearly visible in Google satellite imagery (2026).
Kiwi	76.28	41°30′21.6″S 172°44′58.1″E	18 December 1908	3 September 1955	Station building preserved at Tapawera, housing a museum. Remnants of platform clearly visible in Google satellite imagery (2026).
Tui	81.43	41°32′15.8″S 172°43′34.2″E	2 September 1912	3 September 1955	Station building preserved by Nelson Railway Society. Located near Miyazu Japanese Gardens, Nelson. Original location, relying on NZ Rail Maps again.
Kaka	85.94	41°33′48″S 172°41′34″E	2 September 1912	3 September 1955	Relying on NZ Rail Maps again.
Glenhope	96.64	41°38′51.4″S 172°38′59.3″E	2 September 1912	3 September 1955	Station building preserved, at original location.
Kawatiri	103.20	41°41′37.28″S 172°37′2.92″E	21 June 1926	21 June 1931	Junction SH6/SH63. Now a reserve with displays and short walks. Shelter is not from the original station.
Gowanbridge	109.50	41°42′45.4″S 172°33′21.2″E	August 1930	3 October 1932	Never used for timetabled or revenue traffic.

Note, Mararewa is described as a ″stopping place for passengers″ by Juliet Scoble, and did not reopen after June 13, 1954.

== See also ==
- Nelson Section
- Nelson Railway Society, which has the Tui railway station
