= Freezing Works railway station =

Defunct railway station in New Zealand

Freezing Works

General information
- Location: Kotua Street & Elms Street, Stoke
- Coordinates: 41°19′43.26″S 173°12′26.42″E
- System: New Zealand Government Railways (NZGR) regional rail
- Owner: Nelson Freezing Company
- Line: Nelson Section

History
- Opened: April 1909
- Closed: 3 September 1955
Location

The Nelson Freezing Company's works between Stoke and Richmond in the Tasman district of New Zealand's South Island were a major source of traffic for the Nelson Section from 1909 to 1955. This was a freight-only station, with no passenger facilities ever being located at this site.

Facilities at this station included a twenty-three wagon loop, stockyards, an unloading ramp and a private siding that ended beside the freezer chamber.

== History ==
The Nelson Freezing Company constructed its freezing works beside the railway (which was between the Waimea Inlet and the works) and in April 1909 shipped its first load of frozen mutton carcases the 7 miles (11 km) to the port in three trains of 6 insulated wagons to be loaded on the refrigerated ship SS Rakaia. This allowed for one train to be loading at the works, one to be unloading at the port, and the other to be in transit.

Much of the livestock that supplied the works was transported in via the railway from farms to the south. For around three decades, an average of 30,000 head of livestock per annum were transported to the works, though this could fluctuate significantly from one year to the next. The livestock trade on the Nelson Section, however, paled in comparison to that on the neighbouring Picton Section (now part of the Main North Line) which was consistently transporting 150,000 head per annum.

Rail operations at the works included mixed trains collecting empty livestock wagons to be transported south and leaving full livestock wagons in the loop ready for unloading, as well as shuttling insulated wagons to and from the port.

The Waterfront Strike of 1951 brought an end to the traffic to the port when an Anchor Company vessel berthed at the port to load a shipment of frozen meat bound for Wellington. Permission was requested for an exemption to operate trains from the works to the port, which was refused. The traffic was thus lost to road transport, and never returned to the railway. This station did, however, continue to be used for the transport of livestock from the south to the works for processing until the line was closed on 3 September 1955.

== Today ==
The freezing works have long since closed and been demolished. The site has more recently been redeveloped for other commercial and industrial interests.

== See also ==
- List of Nelson railway stations
