= Tui railway station =

Defunct railway station in New Zealand

Tui

General information
- Location: Tui Road, Tasman District, New Zealand
- Coordinates: 41°32′18.58″S 172°43′29.88″E
- System: New Zealand Government Railways (NZGR)
- Owner: Railways Department
- Line: Nelson Section
- Platforms: Single side
- Tracks: Main line (1); Loops (2)

History
- Opened: 2 September 1912
- Closed: 3 September 1955
- Former names: Manu
Location

Tui railway station was a rural railway station that served the small farming settlement of Tui in the Tasman District of New Zealand’s South Island. It was one of 25 stations on the Nelson Section, and lasted from 1912 to 1955.

Facilities at this station included: stockyards, accessed via a 22-wagon backshunt; two loops, having a 37 and 27 wagon capacity respectively; a station building; a main goods shed with dimensions of 30 by 20 feet (9.1 m × 6.1 m) and a second smaller goods shed; a loading bank; an outhouse; a railway house (for many years occupied by the local surfaceman); and a water vat.

== History ==
Tui station was opened along with the Kiwi to Glenhope section of the line on 2 September 1912, the date the Public Works Department handed control over to the Railways Department. This section became the last section of the line for most of the life of the Nelson Section, with Glenhope remaining the terminus for all but five years of its operation.

The area in which the station was located was originally known as Mana, and was home to several sawmills. Much of the verdant growth was cleared so farms could be established on the land. While initially successful, these farms eventually proved to be uneconomic.

One of the more prominent local facilities was a school, which opened the same year as the railway and lasted until amalgamation with the nearby Tapawera school in 1942. This proved to be an unpopular move with local parents of school-aged children, until they were mollified by the decision of the last teacher to work at the school to remain in the area and drive a school bus to and from Tapawera.

With the increasing popularity of motor cars in the early 20th century, the plan for the Tui area included the construction of a road overbridge at the southern end of the station yard to safely convey traffic for the upper Sherry River valley over the railway line. The bridge was completed with no problems in 1909. About 260 metres (850 ft) along Tui Road from its junction with the main highway nearest the station, the road turned left to cross the overbridge. On the other side of the bridge, the road rounded a 90-degree right-hand curve to pass behind the station yard before turning left again to cross the river.

This station was closed for three days in June 1954 until the Nelson Section was granted a reprieve, and closed permanently on 3 September 1955.

Shortest names: The three stations with the shortest (three-letter) names in New Zealand are Tui; with Ava in Wellington and Oio in the Ruapehu District.

== Today ==
The road overbridge at the southern end of the yard has been removed, and Tui Road now runs straight through where it used to turn left towards the bridge. At the northern end of the former station yard, the road curves left and heads towards the river.

Tui station was one of the longest surviving and best preserved of the former Nelson Section stations still on its original site. The station building and smaller goods shed remained in situ until 2006 when they were donated to the Nelson Railway Society and moved to Founders Park, Nelson for restoration. The Society received a Merit Award at the 2008 FRONZ Conference for their work on this restoration project. The restored station was officially reopened at a ceremony on Saturday, 16 August 2008.

== See also ==
- Nelson Section
- List of Nelson railway stations
