= Stoke railway station, Tasman Region =

Defunct railway station in New Zealand

Stoke

General information
- Location: Songer Street & St. Francis Way, Stoke
- Coordinates: 41°18′44.08″S 173°13′50.93″E
- System: New Zealand Government Railways Department regional rail
- Owner: Railways Department
- Line: Nelson Section
- Platforms: Single

History
- Opened: 1876-01-29; 1954-06-17 (freight only)
- Closed: 1954-06-13; 1955-09-03
Location

Stoke railway station was a single-platform provincial railway station serving the town of Stoke, south of Nelson in New Zealand’s South Island. It was one of 25 stations on the Nelson Section, and existed from 1876 to 1955.

Facilities at the station included a small wooden station building, a thirty-one wagon loop, a loading bank and stockyards.

== History ==
The first section of the Nelson Section to be built was from Stoke to Foxhill, as the route for this part of the line was the first to be confirmed while the route out of Nelson was still being debated. This included the construction of the Stoke railway station, which was opened along with the first completed section from Nelson to Foxhill on 29 January 1876.

The first "turning-of-the-first-sod" ceremony on the Nelson Section was held at Saxton’s Field, just south of Stoke, and this location, along with the Stoke racecourse, would become some of the first destinations for excursion trains. In later years, the station became popular with racecourse patrons and students commuting to secondary school in Nelson.

One notable feature of Stoke is the fact that it was the only location on the Nelson Section where the mainline rail was heavier than the standard 53 pounds per yard, at 70 pounds per yard.

This station was closed for three days in June 1954 until the Nelson Section was granted a reprieve, and closed permanently on 3 September 1955.

== Today ==
When work started on the Nelson section in the 19th century, Stoke was a small township south of Nelson where one of the main commercial activities was fruit husbandry. In the decades that followed the closure of the railway, the orchards were supplanted by suburban growth from Nelson, and Stoke is now no longer a separate entity. Whereas Stoke railway station was once surrounded by empty paddocks, the site is now in the midst of houses.

== See also ==
- List of Nelson railway stations
