= Brightwaters =

Brightwaters may refer to:

- Brightwaters, New South Wales, Australia
- Brightwaters, New York, United States

== See also ==
- Brightwater (disambiguation)
