= Hope railway station, Tasman Region =

Defunct railway station in New Zealand

Hope
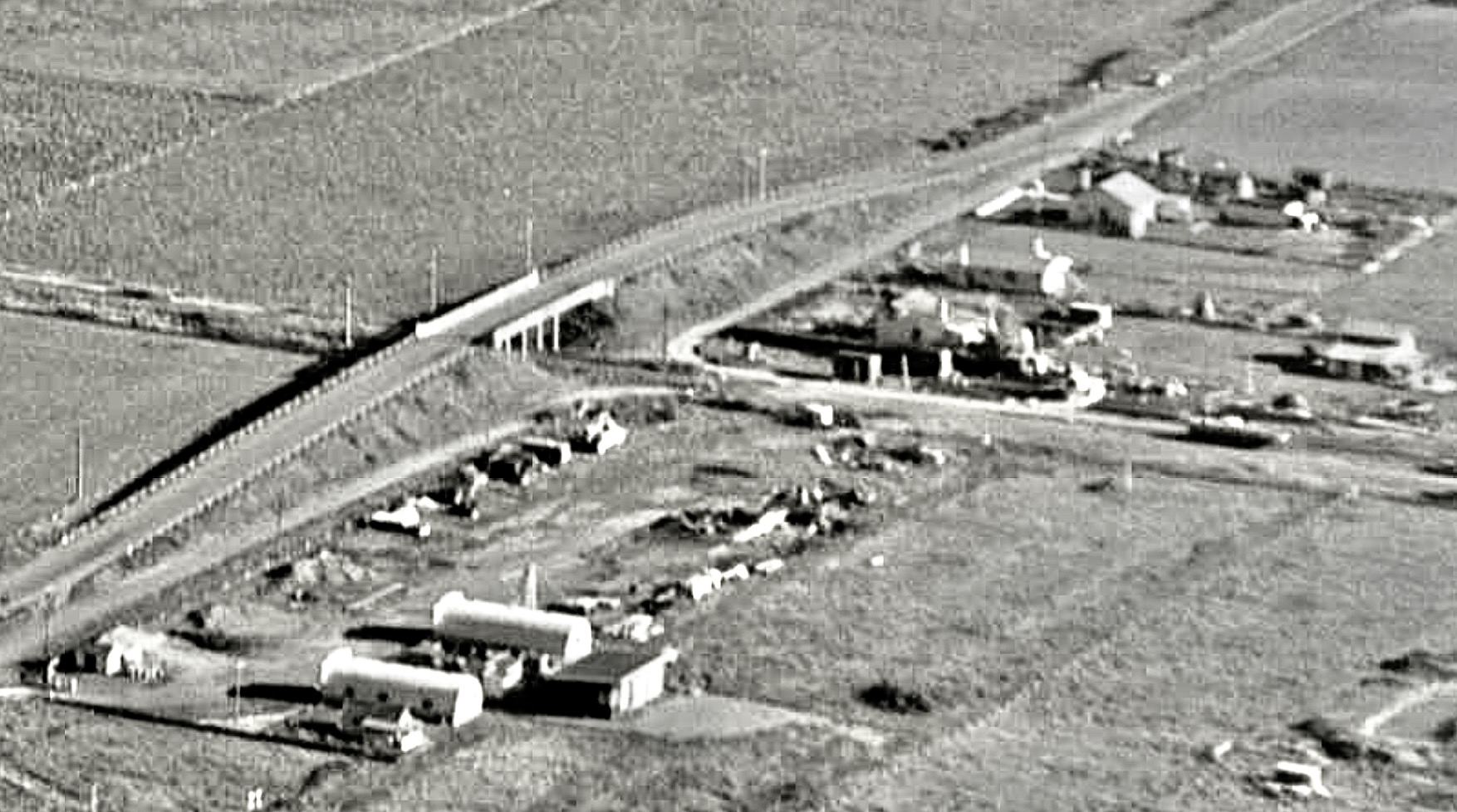
- Hope station in 1951

General information
- Location: 194 Ranzau Rd West, Hope, Richmond
- Coordinates: 41°21′10.65″S 173°9′4.69″E
- System: New Zealand Government Railways Department regional rail
- Owner: Railways Department
- Line: Nelson Section
- Platforms: None
- Tracks: Main line (1); Siding (1)

History
- Opened: 1876-01-29
- Closed: 1955-09-03
Location

Hope railway station was a rural railway station serving the small town of Hope in the Tasman district of New Zealand’s South Island. Hope is located on State Highway 6 between the larger towns of Richmond, to the north, and Brightwater, to the south. It was one of 25 stations on the Nelson Section, and existed from 1876 to 1955.

Facilities at this station included a small wooden passenger shelter, goods shed and siding.

== History ==
The first section of the Nelson Section to be built was from Stoke to Foxhill, as the route for this part of the line was the first to be confirmed while the route out of Nelson was still being debated. This included the construction of the Hope railway station, which was opened along with the first completed section from Nelson to Foxhill on 29 January 1876.

Hope was one of seven stations on the Nelson Section between Nelson and Belgrove to have a goods shed, and came to the attention of the Nelson Progress League in 1949 because of the condition of the goods shed. The League was, at the time, conducting a campaign to encourage government investment in the line, and cited Hope as an example of the dilapidated state of the railway. The goods shed was later demolished and replaced with a smaller lean-to structure. In 1949 the wooden goods shed was 40 ft (12 m) x 20 ft (6.1 m), with a corrugated iron roof.

In the 1950s, the Valetta Timber Company established a sawmill in a paddock behind the goods shed which included a private rail siding. This resulted in one of the busiest periods for revenue traffic for the station.

This station was closed for three days in June 1954 until the Nelson Section was granted a reprieve, and closed permanently on 3 September 1955.

== Today ==
The former Hope station yard is now part of the commercial premises of Taylor Timbers Ltd, a lumber wholesaler.

== See also ==
- List of Nelson railway stations
