= Richmond railway station, New Zealand =

Defunct railway station in New Zealand

Richmond

General information
- Location: Queen Street & State Highway 6, Richmond
- Coordinates: 41°20′9.08″S 173°10′52.84″E
- System: New Zealand Government Railways Department regional rail
- Owner: Railways Department
- Line: Nelson Section
- Platforms: Single

History
- Opened: 1876-01-29
- Closed: 1955-09-03
Location

Richmond railway station was a single-platform urban railway station serving the town of Richmond in the Tasman district of New Zealand’s South Island. It was one of 25 stations on the Nelson Section, and existed from 1876 to 1955.

Richmond was, at the time, the second largest town in the district, and accordingly received a station befitting its status. Facilities included a wooden station building (which for several decades also housed a Post & Telegraph Office), two water vats, gangers sheds, stockyards, a 12 wagon backshunt, and a goods shed.

== History ==
The first section of the Nelson Section to be built was from Stoke to Foxhill, as the route for this part of the line was the first to be confirmed while the route out of Nelson was still being debated. This included the construction of the Richmond railway station, which was opened along with the first completed section from Nelson to Foxhill on 29 January 1876.

Richmond was appointed a stationmaster, who was based there until being transferred in 1910. The station remained unstaffed until protests from locals resulted in the appointment of a porter in 1913. With improvements to the local highways, traffic through Richmond station was gradually lost to the roads, and in 1924 the porter was transferred and never replaced.

Some of the traffic specific to Richmond included the Army Volunteers who held Easter camps on land near the station from soon after the railway opened, and patrons for Richmond Park, which was established by the Nelson Jockey Club in 1884. As Richmond Park was near the station, it attracted large crowds, most of whom travelled there by train, and only had a short distance to walk to the racecourse.

This station was closed for three days in June 1954 until the Nelson Section was granted a reprieve, and closed permanently on 3 September 1955.

== Today ==
There are no signs remaining in Richmond of the station that used to be there. The last relic, the stations platform edge, has disappeared.

The Richmond Deviation occupies much of the former railway formation between the Freezing Works and the Richmond station site.

== See also ==
- List of Nelson railway stations
