= Founders Heritage Park =

Museum in Nelson, New Zealand

Coordinates: 41°15′42″S 173°17′49″E

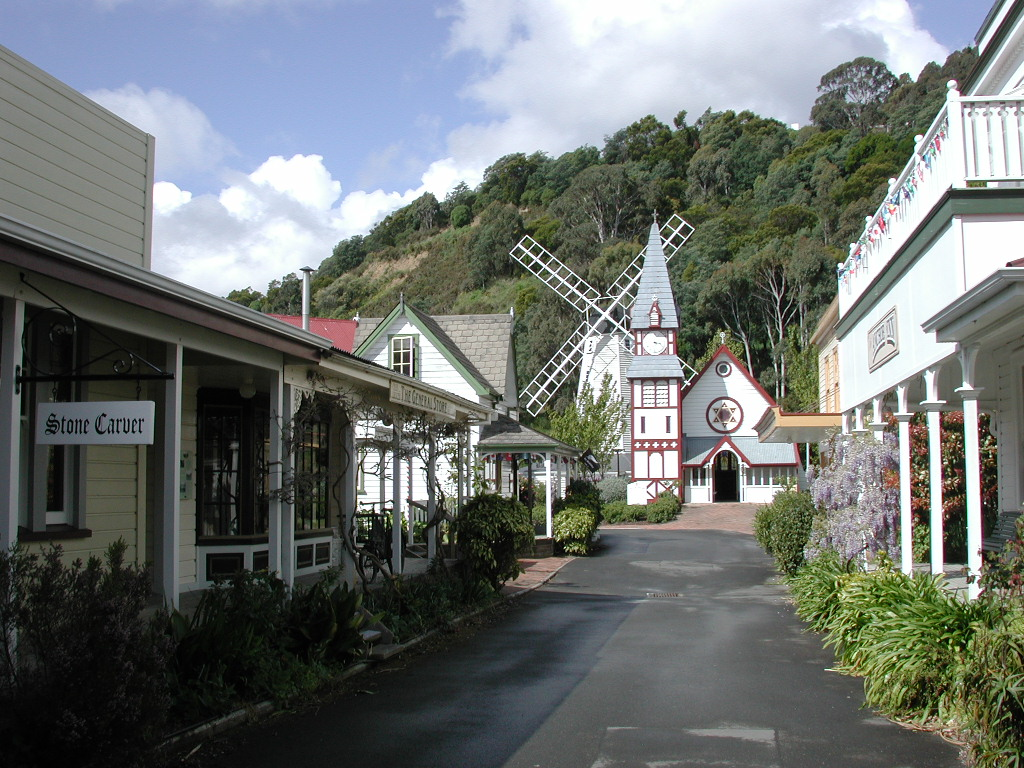
Main street with old shops

Founders Heritage Park is a museum in Nelson, New Zealand, housing a number of groups with historical themes, including transport. A short heritage railway line is operated by the Nelson Railway Society. Several shops operate in the museum, selling bakery and other artisan foods, as well as locally made arts & crafts.

== History ==
Founders Heritage Park was set up largely by community effort via Founders Inc. in 1977 and opened to the public in 1986. The buildings it houses are a mix of donated original buildings and historic replicas constructed with the help of local companies. Most of the historic collections have been donated by Nelson residents.

The ownership and management of the park transferred to Nelson City Council in 1995. The park also hosts events such as craft and book fairs.

== See also ==
- List of New Zealand railway museums and heritage lines
