= Dun Mountain Railway =

Former tramway line in Nelson, New Zealand

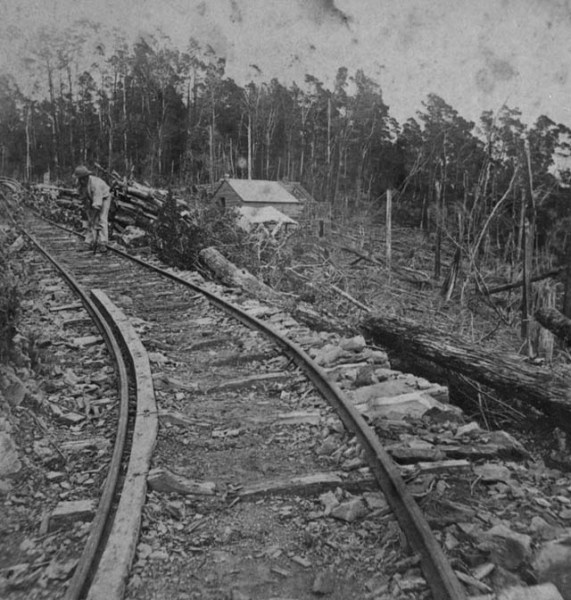
- Dun Mountain Railway

Overview
- Status: Closed
- Owner: Dun Mountain Company; Robert Levien; Moses Crewdson; Jonathan Harle; Nelson City Council
- Locale: Nelson, New Zealand
- Termini: Hardy Street, Nelson (passenger), Wooded Peak (freight); Nelson Port
- Stations: 2 (passenger); 4 (freight)

Service
- Type: Tramway
- Operator(s): Dun Mountain Company; Thomas Nesbitt; James McConkey; William Weeden and Alfred Brind; Bray Bros. William Taylor; Stevenson and McGlashan; Thomas Newton; Robert Levien; Moses Crewdson; Jonathan Harle; Nelson City Council

History
- Opened: 3 February 1862
- Closed: January 1866 (freight); 30 May 1901 (passenger)

Technical
- Line length: 21.5 km (13.4 mi) (original); 1.8 km (1.1 mi) (subsequent to the closure and lifting of the incline)
- Character: mountainous, suburban
- Track gauge: 3 ft (914 mm)

The Dun Mountain Railway was a privately owned and operated 3 ft (914 mm) narrow gauge, 21.5 km (13.4 mi) long horse-drawn tramway from chromite mines in the vicinity of Duppa Lode on the eastern slopes of Wooded Peak to Nelson port in the Tasman District of New Zealand's South Island. It operated from 3 February 1862 to 30 May 1901, with the last mineral traffic on the incline section operated in January 1866.

This line was the first "railway" to be opened and operated in New Zealand, preceding the first public railway and the first railway to be operated by steam trains, the line between Ferrymead and Christchurch, which opened on 1 December 1863. The city of Nelson had the first city tramway to both open and close in New Zealand.

== History ==
=== Background ===
Prominent advocates for the mining of mineral deposits found on Wooded Peak included a syndicate formed by William Long Wrey, William Travers and William Wells. In the winter of 1853 a local runholder, George Duppa, discovered a large deposit of chromite between Wooded Peak and Dun Mountain, about 8 kilometres south-east of Nelson township. It was named the Duppa Lode, but considered to be of no commercial value at the time.

The syndicate readily agreed that in order to exploit the mineral deposits a tramway would need to transport the product back to Nelson. After attempts to raise capital for the project locally failed in August 1853, Wrey headed to England in October to raise further capital. His efforts were successful, resulting in the formation of the New Zealand Land Fund Association backed by 20 London financiers, who had each contributed £500. Wrey returned to New Zealand on 8 August 1855 with 24 miners and an engineer, Jeremiah How.

In early 1857 the Dun Mountain Copper Mining Company Ltd. formed, and shareholders in the Cook's Straight Company previously formed by the mining syndicate were able to exchange their shares for fully paid-up ones in the new company, with a further 5,000 B shares reserved for sale in New Zealand.

The first shareholders' meeting of the company took place on 22 July 1857. Investors learned of plans to construct a 16-kilometre (9.9 mi) long light railway along the Maitai Valley - to be worked up the incline by horses and in the opposite direction by gravity.

To determine the extent of the copper deposits on which the company could rely the directors employed mining engineer Thomas R. Hacket. A local management committee was appointed to assist Hacket, consisting of Wrey, Wells, merchant George Ridings and Maxwell Bury as secretary.

Hacket arrived in Nelson on 31 October 1857 and set about appraising the copper deposits, which he found wanting. Rather than make known in Nelson his disappointing first impression, he allowed the survey for the Maitai Valley railway to go ahead.

On completion of the survey, conducted by local engineer Edward Moody, the first consignment of tramway materials arrived from London on 11 January 1858. They were stored in the company's yard on Haven Road pending the enactment of the necessary railway legislation.

By 1858 word had spread locally of Hacket's negative reports on the deposits, causing considerable antagonism between Hacket and Wrey. Some of the shareholders in London were sufficiently angry to claim that Wrey had defrauded them. Though Wrey was never subjected to legal action, he was removed from the Nelson management committee.

Though it was realised that there were no commercially exploitable copper deposits in the mineral belt, Hacket was sufficiently impressed with the chromite deposits that had earlier been found on Wooded Peak. The directors were thus dissuaded from liquidating the company while awaiting the testing of chromite samples forwarded to England. As these new mineral deposits were at a higher elevation on Wooded Peak the earlier proposed route of the tramway along the Maitai Valley had become redundant, and Hacket set about investigating a more direct route around Wooded Peak.

Testing confirmed the high quality of the ore, later confirmed by Joseph Gibbs in June 1858. In 1859 Hacket demonstrated with underground prospecting that the deposits persisted below the surface. With his favourable reports extolling the extent of the ore available, the directors were convinced to begin mining, which would involve a tramway from the Coppermine Saddle to Nelson Port. On 24 February 1860 notice was given by company secretary Maxwell Bury of the company's intention to seek legislative approval for the construction of a tramway along a route chosen by Hacket.

=== Construction ===
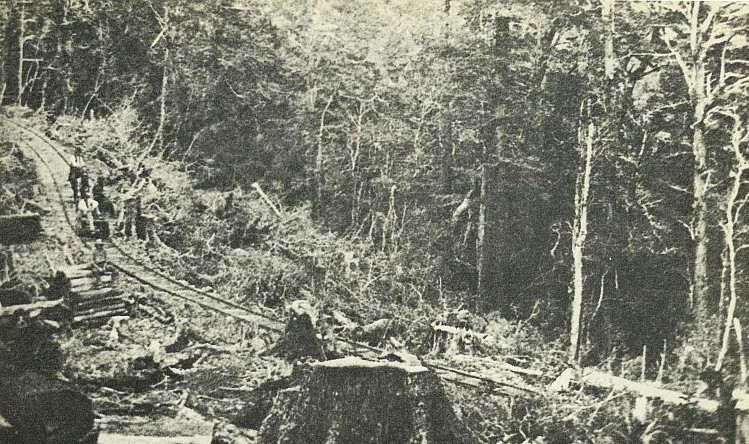
Stack of wooden ties beside the Dun Mountain Railway in heavily wooded country

Two Irish engineers with railway experience, William Doyne assisted by Abraham Fitzgibbon, were engaged by the directors to manage the construction of the line. They arrived in Nelson along with the Fitzgibbon's family on 18 July 1860.

They quickly dismissed Hacket's proposal and agreed that a better route to Wooded Peak was to be had through the Brook Valley. This change in plans was not well received by the committee that had been appointed to study the proposal as submitted for the accompanying legislation, which was accordingly withdrawn by the company.

The earthworks for the 5.8-kilometre (3.6 mi) long section between the mines and the Wairoa Saddle were put out to tender in 1861 and awarded the following February to contractors Charles Ambler, John Davis and Robert Carter, each working on approximately equal lengths. The work included a 1.8-metre (5 ft 11 in) wide ledge in the side of Wooded Peak, drainage and six bridges.

The route of the next 11-kilometre (6.8 mi) section from Brook Street to the Wairoa Saddle was debated amongst the engineers, but they eventually settled on a gradient of 1:18 for the first 8 kilometres (5.0 mi) with the rest at 1:20. This was divided into seven sections that were put to tender and let on 3 June 1861 to, amongst others, the contractors Hale, Vercoe and party; John Ward and John Mitchell; John Brown and George Cummins; and W. Martin and John Avery.

The company advertised for a supply of 20,000 sleepers after rejecting a trial in which sleepers had been cut from trees adjoining the rail formation. The price they were quoted in response was £1 per hundred more than the price they had earlier received for sleepers supplied from their own land, but having spent two months on the tender process they decided to proceed with the tenders received from the sawmills. Approximately 24,000 sleepers were required.

On 17 August the Dun Mountain Railway Act authorising the construction of the railway on public lands was passed. It was based on earlier bills from the Provincial Council and one of 1860 which was withdrawn over the issue of the route of the line.

The act allowed the company to begin construction of the line from the incline section through Nelson, following Brook, Tasman, Manuka, Alton, Hardy, and Rutherford Streets, and along the shoreline on Haven Road to the port. Three contracts for this section were let in late August 1861 to contractors Mark Blythe and Robert Carter. Work on the town section was completed within four months.

At around the same time work commenced on the formation between the incline and the port, Dudderidge Gibbs submitted a successful tender for track laying work on the incline section. This work started on 4 September 1861, but it was soon clear that it would not be completed by the end of the year as expected. Eager to begin revenue traffic on the line, the company dismissed Gibbs despite his protestations, and continued the work itself on 23 September.

The final shipment of rails arrived on 25 October 1861, numbering 2,314, including 26 casks of bolts. The last rail was laid in January 1862.

=== Inauguration ===
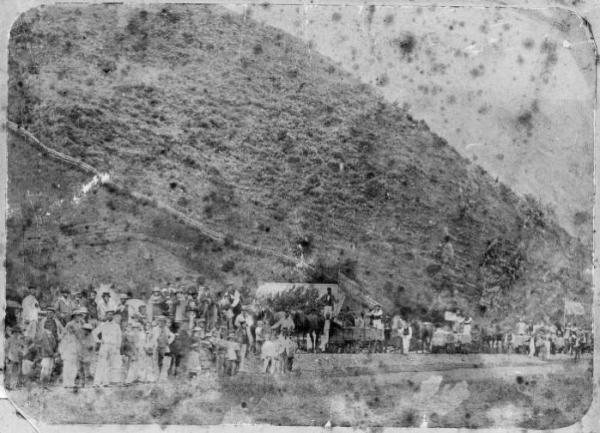
Opening of Dun Mountain tramway, 3 Feb 1862

The railway was officially opened on 3 February 1862. Around £75,000 had been spent, of which approximately a third went into the construction of the railway.

At noon, horse-drawn paired wagons left the company depot in Brook Street for the port, with the Nelson Brass Band being seated in the first pair of wagons. The next set of wagons carried company officials and guests, also on temporary seating. The remaining wagons were loaded with ore.

The procession proceeded along streets lined with the local inhabitants, who had earlier erected flags and banners. Once the procession reached the port and the ore had been dumped at the privately owned Albion Wharf, they returned to town.

In gratitude for the efforts of the men who had been involved in the construction of the line, the company gave each of them a paid holiday, and treated them to a lunch at the Freemasons' Hall. As was then customary several speeches were given, after which a toast was offered to Wrey. The day's festivities were concluded with a soiree and ball.

=== Operation ===
==== Freight services ====
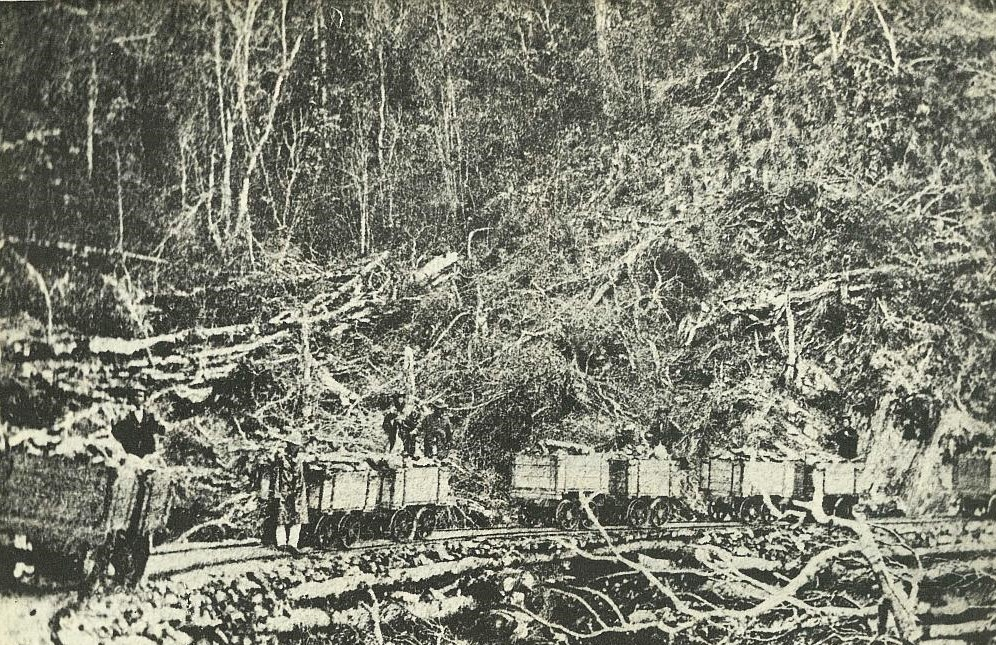
Freight train of the Dun Mountain railway. Trucks were pulled up the grade by horses, and descended by gravity.

The tramway's act of parliament prohibited the use of locomotives within the city limits. This was no real problem for the company, as they had always intended to work the line with horses and rely on gravity for descending ore wagons. The horses averaged 4 miles per hour (6.4 km/h) when pulling empty wagons up the incline to the mines, where they were unhitched and returned to First House on Brook Street. Once the wagons were full, they descended to Nelson in pairs under the control of a brakeman.

Trials were undertaken to determine safe working procedures for descending wagons. It was soon discovered that as the line had over 700 corners ranging from 20 to 200 metres (22 to 219 yards) radius, descending speeds in excess of 4 miles per hour (6.4 km/h) meant an unacceptable risk of derailment. At the bottom of the incline, the wagons usually retained sufficient momentum to continue unaided to the corner of Hardy and Rutherford Streets. The wagons were then hauled by horses at up to 4 miles per hour (6.4 km/h) through the city to the port where the ore was later shipped to England from the Provincial Government-owned wharf.

In February 1862 the company prohibited the carriage of any persons in the wagons on the line as the entire capacity of the 20 wagons was required for the transport of the ore. Horses hauled the empty wagons up to the mine in the mornings, and once loaded they departed for the port under gravity at 13:15. The distance was expected to be covered in 45 minutes to Third House, with a further 1 hour and 30 minutes to the Alton Street depot. Any trip conducted in less than the allotted time could lead to the dismissal of the brakeman for speeding. On 23 March 1862 the capacity of the line was increased with the arrival of an additional 25 wagons.

In late 1862 Fitzgibbon had to tell the directors in London that the ore was not available in such abundance as was first thought. It was no longer profitable to continue to mine the chromite, and after transporting around 1,400 tonnes (1,378 long tons; 1,543 short tons) of the ore mining operations were suspended from early 1863. Thereafter, the company relied on sales of firewood, timber, flagstones and road gravel from its own land, and revenue from the passenger "city bus" (a horse-dawn tram) to meet their overheads. This generated only around £1,300 per year, approximately a quarter from the passenger operation.

However, by mid-1863 the chromite market showed signs of improvement, allowing the company to sell 1,400 tonnes (1,378 long tons; 1,543 short tons) of ore and receive forward orders for an additional 2,100 tonnes (2,067 long tons; 2,315 short tons) either stored in England or en route from Nelson. In order to stabilise the demand for its ore, the company purchased a controlling stake in Connah's Quay Chemical Company, a dye manufacturer due to be established in North Wales.

Confident in the security of the market for chromite, the company resumed mining on Wooded Peak later that year. With the departure of Hacket, the company sought to hire someone with mining experience to support the Nelson management team, and accordingly appointed an experienced mining engineer by the name of Joseph Cock from Tavistock in Devon as the new manager.

The company had also developed some new sources of revenue, including lime from a kiln built at Wooded Peak, gravel for use on the roads, and the leasing of wagons to local merchants for the transport of inbound goods from the port to Nelson.

Traffic increased on the line to levels not seen for some time when the mining resumed. During 1863 the mines produced 595 tonnes (586 long tons; 656 short tons) of ore for export, over half of which was exported in November. Congestion at the port was such that permission was obtained from the Board of Works to install a loop siding on Haven Road at Auckland Point, though it is not known if this work was completed. Other small safety improvements were also made.

==== Passenger services ====
Though the railway was initially used only for the transport of ore to the port, the company had made provision for the operation of both freight and passenger services. The railway's act of Parliament required the company to institute at least one daily return service between the city and the port, except where the revenue from all services failed to exceed 10 shillings.

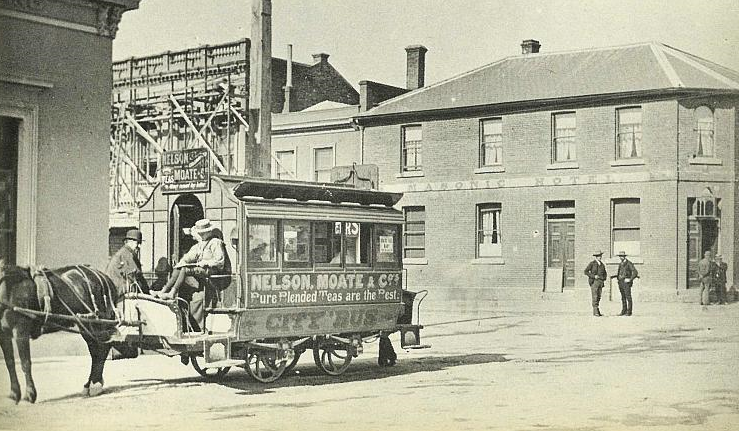
Horse tram on Hardy Street from Trafalgar Street via Rutherford Street, Haven Road to the Tasman Hotel at the port. It operated until 1901 as last remnant of the old Dun Mountain railway.

The company already had wagons in which to conduct its freight traffic, so for the passenger services they ordered a horse-drawn tram in late 1861 from the Australian firm of Keary and Company. The tram was soon known as a bus, also referred to as the Dun Mountain Bus or the City Bus, and later as a tram. It arrived in Nelson on 23 March 1862.

The first operator of the tram was Thomas Nesbitt, a long-time local who arrived in Nelson in 1842.

The inaugural service of the tram occurred on Saturday, 3 May 1862. A trial run between the city and the port showed, amongst other things, that fears the tram would be unstable when fully laden on account of the narrow gauge were not warranted. Vibrations were experienced, however, due to the wheels being locked to the axles. Fare-paying passengers were carried throughout the day, with regular services commencing at 0900 the following Monday.

The tram departed every half-hour from either the Port or Hardy Street termini, providing a reliable daily service. Though the legislation specified a speed limit of 4 mph (6.4 km/h), in practice average speeds of 6 to 7 mph (9.7 to 11.3 km/h) were maintained. Among the conditions imposed by the company on the operator, he had to provide services between 0900 and sunset at not more than 6d per fare (the fare cap did not apply to services operated outside these times). As the company was originally established to profit from the chromite ore, which was at the time making them in excess of £1,000 in revenue per week, the local management saw no need to burden themselves with the running of passenger services.

Later that year the company realised that in not taking an interest in the passenger services they were forgoing a reasonable source of revenue, and accordingly entered into a leasing arrangement with the operator.

Late in 1863 James McConkey purchased the lease on the tram and introduced some changes, including freeing the wheels to turn independently of the axles. This had the benefit of making the ride more comfortable and reducing wear on both the tram and rails. He also reduced the daylight running fare to 3d, though the after dark fare remained unaltered. McConkey's tenure as operator of the tram lasted to the mid-1860s, by which time he had become a timber merchant.

An increase in confidence in the company's future subsequent to the resumption of mining activities in 1863 led to debate on whether the line should be extended into Trafalgar and Bridge Streets. Despite popular support for such a move no-one was prepared to finance it, and there was a small band of vocal opponents, including competing transport operators. Though their concerns were largely commercial, it is easy to see that the tram was providing strong competition, for in mid-February 1864 the services were increased to half-hourly in both directions. City departures were on the hour and half-hour, with Port departures 15 minutes later.

At around the time Cock arrived, further changes were made to the operation of the tram. In July 1864 railway by-laws were introduced that forbade smoking on the tram and the carrying of inebriated passengers, and introduced penalties for failing to purchase a ticket.

By April 1866 the tram was being operated by William Weeden and Alfred Brind. It was during their tenure that the tram received its first refurbishment, during which time passenger services were provided using wagons with temporary seating.

On encountering financial difficulties in the winter of 1866 Weeden terminated his connection with the tram, with Brind doing likewise soon after. The lease was picked up by the Brays.

In 1870 the Brays relinquished the lease on the tram, which was briefly taken over by William Taylor, who had earlier worked as a driver of the tram for the Brays. The following year, the lease passed to Stevenson and McGlashan, and in early 1872 to Thomas Newton.

In the winding up of the company the line between Nelson and the port, including the passenger operation, was sold in June 1872 as a going concern to Moses Crewdson by Levien. With the mining operation gone the line was essentially passenger only, with only the occasional carriage of goods on the line for Crewdson. The line was still subject to the provisions of the Dun Mountain Railway Act.

Crewdson renovated the service, including rehabilitating the line and painting the tram. The service was renamed to Crewdson's City Bus, and employed several drivers in addition to Crewdson himself and several stable hands to tend to the horses. At some point an additional tram was purchased, with the original tram thereafter only being used when passenger demand or maintenance on the new tram required it.

Crewdson had been unable to come to an acceptable agreement regarding the sale of the tram service to the council, so in June 1884 he sold the operation to its last owner, Jonathan Harle. Though Harle was interested in maximising his revenue from the service he was equally determined to spend as little on maintenance as possible, with the only apparent change to the service on the transfer of ownership being the removal of Crewdson's name from the livery. He continued with the postal delivery contract established by his predecessor, and came to an arrangement with the proprietor of the Marine Baths on Wakefield Quay whereby he could sell concession tickets covering a return fare and use of the baths.

=== Demise ===
==== Freight services ====
The revival in the company's fortunes was short-lived. By the autumn of 1864, after exporting 768 tonnes of ore that year, it was discovered that the chromite deposits had been worked out, leaving only small pockets of low-grade ore. Again mining was suspended, though the company continued to use the incline to rail out firewood, rock and lime.

The company was keen to secure reliable shipments of chromite from its mines to supply Connah's Quay Chemical Company, which was by this time ready to commence operations. Because the new manager, Joseph Cock, had yet to arrive in Nelson, a geological survey of the mines was conducted on 1 June 1864 by Dr James Hector, an assayer working for the Otago Provincial Government.

On 5 July 1864 Cock and his family arrived in Nelson. The directors were disappointed when on examining the mines Cock came to the same conclusion that had already been conveyed to them regarding the chromite supplies. He set about prospecting other areas in the mineral belt in an attempt to find other workable lodes of chromite, including a deposit below the railway that would have required a branch line to be constructed. In the end, Cock reported that constructing such a line would not be financially viable.

Cock estimated that revenue from other sources would be almost sufficient to cover overheads, so any decision on the future of the company was deferred. As part of the retrenchment measures, the secretary was terminated in August 1865. Cock was also authorised to extract the remaining 400 tonnes of ore from the mines, though because of its inferior quality, only 281 tonnes of it was exported. Mining operations ceased in January 1866.

In March 1866 the London-based directors resolved to liquidate the company, though this was not carried out. They tried without success to sell the assets of the company in April 1867 and again in March 1868.

Though there was no hope that chromite or copper mining would resume, the company remained hopeful that other mineral resources would be found on its land, and in October 1869 halted plans to sell or dismantle the railway. Surveys conducted the following year and in September 1871 by the New Zealand Geological Survey confirmed that there were no commercially viable mineral deposits.

As a result of these reports the directors decided in 1871 to liquidate the company. The following year, the company's assets were advertised for sale by auction.

As the date for the auction drew near, Cock wrote to the Board of Works suggesting that they consider purchasing the railway to safeguard their supply of rock that the company had been producing. The Board advised that though it was not legally able to purchase the railway itself, it could be considered by the provincial council. A public meeting was held to discuss the proposal on 10 May, at which the consensus was to not proceed with the proposal, despite a minority advocating the idea, so as to be able to completely remove it.

Five days later, all of the assets of the company were sold by auctioneers William Stavert and Company to local merchant Robert Levien. Considering the investment made and the valuation of the company's assets, the price attained of only £4,750 was a poor result. After confirming that the provincial council had no interest in the railway, Levien was quick to split up and sell off the assets. The line from Trafalgar Street to the mines was lifted and sold to various buyers, with this work complete by the end of 1872. The Alton Street yard was sold to Sir David Munro in September 1873, and the timber processing machinery had already been sold to James Burford. Three months later the company's land at Wooded Peak was sold to James Newport.

==== Passenger services ====
By July 1893, the tram had been running for over 30 years and the maintenance costs were rising at an unacceptable rate, with much of this attributable to the run-down state of the assets, particularly the rails. Harle resolved to sell the operation and put everything up for sale by tender. When no tenders were received to his satisfaction, he approached the council to see if it was interested in purchasing it. As it were in some financial difficulties and realising that a significant expense would be involved in upgrading the railway, it declined Harle's offer.

On 18 January 1901, the council received a petition from Hardy Street business owners and cab drivers demanding that something be done about the parlous state of the railway. The council held a meeting to consider the petition, and the majority of councillors were in favour of purchasing and dismantling the railway, though the minority were in favour of retaining it. Following this meeting, the council's finance committee was authorised to conduct due diligence on the railway.

At the next council meeting, on 5 February 1901, an offer from Harle for the sale of the tram operation including all assets bar the Haven Road property was tabled. The council agreed to commence negotiations, but first needed to obtain statutory authorisation from a ratepayer plebiscite as a loan would need to be raised.

The poll was conducted on 19 April 1901, with the result being 369 in favour, 244 against and 12 informal of a total of 625 ballots cast from 1,591 eligible voters. Six days later a new council was elected, which quickly confirmed the intention to purchase and close the railway. A problem was encountered when the council was reminded by the Treasury that it would be illegal for them to raise a loan under the Loans to Local Bodies Act, which they resolved by instead issuing debentures on 15 May 1901.

The city purchased the railway and trams on 30 May 1901, with the last fare-paying journey being made the same day. This service to the port and back carried several local dignitaries, including Mayor Henry Baigent, councillors Charles Harley, Frederick Fairey and William Akersten, and several members of the public. Town Clerk Harry Gully was on hand to ensure that the fares collected made it into the city coffers.

The council voted on 7 June 1901 to lift the rails, with work commencing on 26 June 1901 and being completed by 6 July 1901. The sleepers were sold, though many of the rails were retained by the council for its own use. The trams were sold at auction on 14 December 1901 to Joseph Taylor, acting on behalf of the Puponga Coal & Gold Mining Company.

== Stations ==
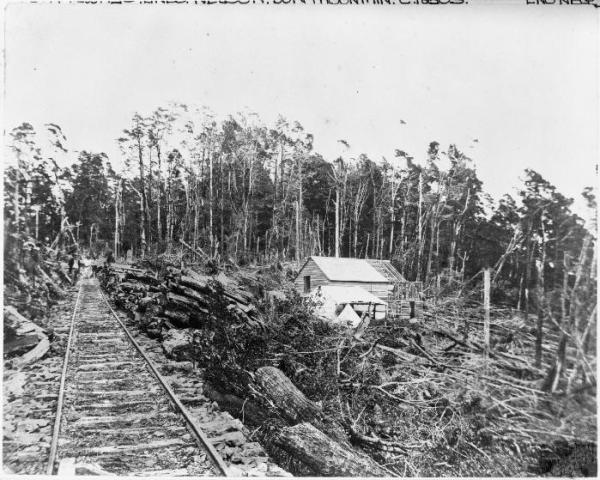
Scene at Dun Mountain, 1862

The company did not have stations on the incline section: it established four depots that it called "houses". The first, at the start of the incline section, included stores, workshops for the carpenters and blacksmiths, stables for up to ten horses, a four-room house and a two-room cottage. The next most important depot was Third House, on the Wairoa Saddle, approximately halfway along the incline section. Second and Fourth Houses included small buildings for maintenance work and shelter for the staff.

While waiting for the delivery of the tram, the company communicated with the Board of Works in January 1862 to arrange for the installation of suitable passenger stations, as required under the act. The Board initially deferred a response, pending a decision on suitable sites. Later that month the company again wrote to the Board to suggest that four stations be established, at Alton Street; outside the Masonic Hotel; adjacent to the City Market Hall, on the Fish Market Reserve; and at the Government Wharf at the port. The company suggested that further stations would be required when it exercised its right to extend the line into Trafalgar Street and Bridge Street.

Only a week later it changed its stance and suggested that only stations at the port and outside the Masonic Hotel would be required. On 30 January the Board agreed with this suggestion, but attached the stipulation that the latter station should only be a temporary stopping place, that the footpath was not to be obstructed, and that no buildings were to be erected on the roadway.

== Today ==
No trace remains of the City Bus operation in Nelson itself, though one may still walk the Coppermine Trail featuring the incline section of the Dun Mountain Railway from Brook Street. Some parts of the City Bus route are almost unrecognisable today from the days of its operation, largely due to significant reclamation works in the Nelson Haven along Hardy Street.
