= Hope, New Zealand =

Town in Tasman District, New Zealand

Hope
- Town
- Interactive map of Hope
- Coordinates: 41.354°S 173.154°E
- Country: New Zealand
- Territorial authority: Tasman
- Ward: Richmond Ward
- First Settled: 1844
- Electorates: Nelson; Te Tai Tonga (Māori)

Government
  - Territorial Authority: Tasman District Council
  - Mayor of Tasman: Tim King
  - Nelson MP: Rachel Boyack
  - Te Tai Tonga MP: Tākuta Ferris

Area
  - Total: 6.81 km^{2} (2.63 sq mi)

Population (June 2025)
  - Total: 840
  - Density: 120/km^{2} (320/sq mi)

Hope, previously known as Ranzau, is a small settlement in the Tasman District of New Zealand. It lies south of Nelson city, between Richmond and Wakefield.

Hope began as a German settlement, founded by many of the families on the barque Skjold, which left Hamburg on 21 April 1844 and arrived in Nelson on 1 September. The voyage was underwritten by German nobleman Count von Rantzau; in appreciation, Carl Kelling, an early farmer and Count von Rantzau's representative, gave his homestead the name "Ranzau", a name used for the entire village until it was renamed after Jane Hope, another early settler. The German influence survives in Ranzau Road, which itself houses Ranzau School (dating from 1848) as well as a Lutheran church (established in 1849) opposite the newer Hope Community Church.

Hope post office was open by 1886. From 1900 it had a telephone. It closed from 5 February 1988 when Postmaster-General, Richard Prebble, closed or reduced 580 offices.

Today the settlement remains largely rural, dominated by farms and orchards. There are two primary schools (Ranzau School and Hope School), scattered speciality shops (many operating from an orchard or market garden), a restaurant/bar, a convenience store, and a park with tennis courts and a recreation hall.

== Demographics ==
Stats NZ describes Hope as a small urban area, which covers 6.81 km^{2} (2.63 sq mi). It had an estimated population of 840 as of June 2025, with a population density of 113 people per km^{2}.

Historical population
| Year | Pop. | ±% p.a. |
|---|---|---|
| 2006 | 912 | — |
| 2013 | 837 | −1.22% |
| 2018 | 867 | +0.71% |
| 2023 | 840 | −0.63% |
The 2006 population is for a larger area of 7.44 km^{2}. Source:

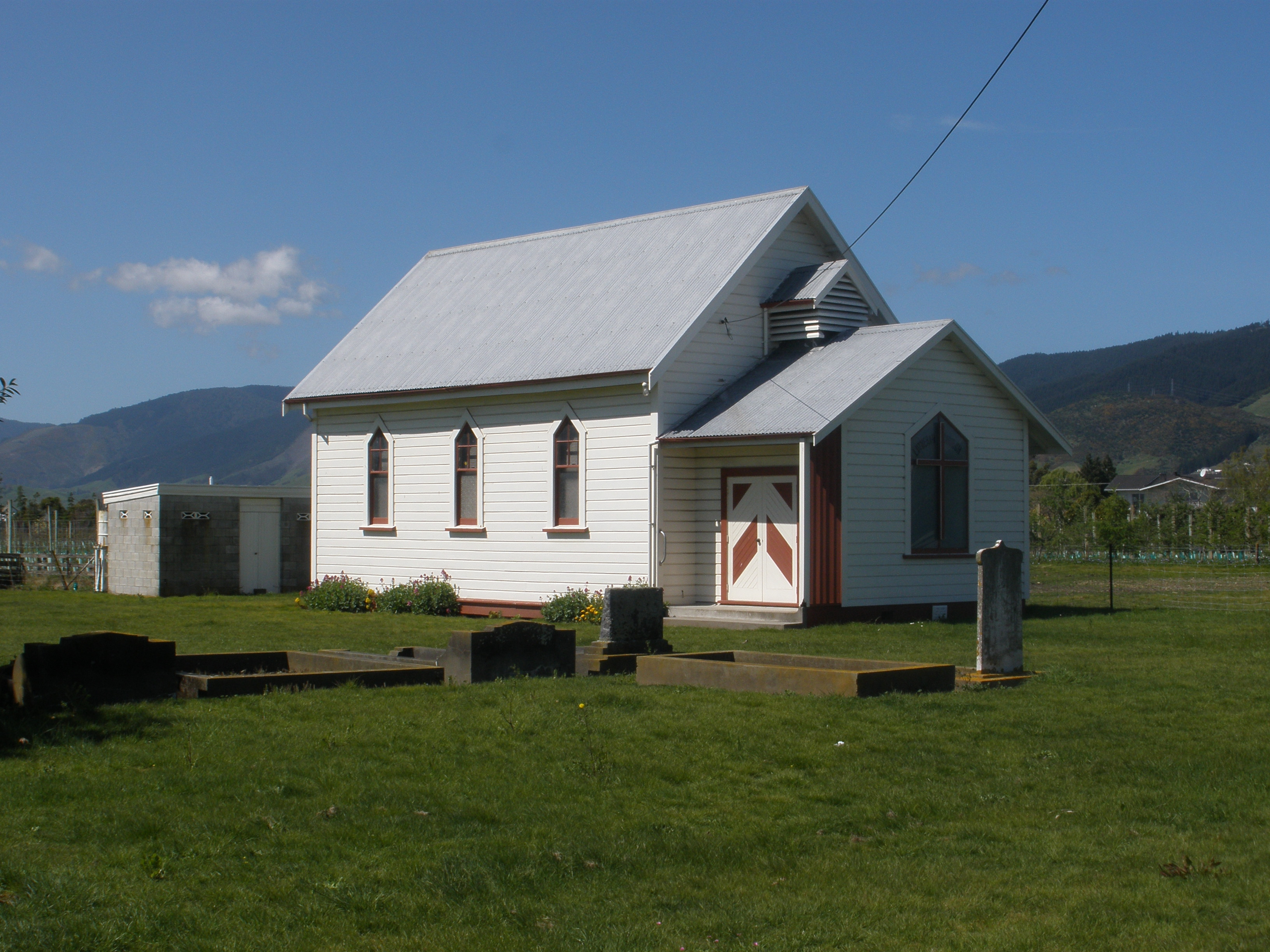
Ranzau Road, Hope, Nelson

Hope had a population of 840 in the 2023 New Zealand census, a decrease of 27 people (−3.1%) since the 2018 census, and an increase of 3 people (0.4%) since the 2013 census. There were 429 males, 405 females, and 6 people of other genders in 297 dwellings. 3.6% of people identified as LGBTIQ+. The median age was 46.1 years (compared with 38.1 years nationally). There were 117 people (13.9%) aged under 15 years, 147 (17.5%) aged 15 to 29, 423 (50.4%) aged 30 to 64, and 150 (17.9%) aged 65 or older.

People could identify as more than one ethnicity. The results were 91.1% European (Pākehā); 11.8% Māori; 2.9% Pasifika; 3.6% Asian; 0.4% Middle Eastern, Latin American and African New Zealanders (MELAA); and 5.4% other, which includes people giving their ethnicity as "New Zealander". English was spoken by 97.5%, Māori by 1.8%, and other languages by 7.5%. No language could be spoken by 1.1% (e.g. too young to talk). New Zealand Sign Language was known by 1.1%. The percentage of people born overseas was 12.5, compared with 28.8% nationally.

Religious affiliations were 27.9% Christian, 0.7% Māori religious beliefs, 0.7% Buddhist, 0.4% New Age, 0.4% Jewish, and 0.7% other religions. People who answered that they had no religion were 60.0%, and 9.3% of people did not answer the census question.

Of those at least 15 years old, 90 (12.4%) people had a bachelor's or higher degree, 462 (63.9%) had a post-high school certificate or diploma, and 171 (23.7%) people exclusively held high school qualifications. The median income was $43,800, compared with $41,500 nationally. 60 people (8.3%) earned over $100,000 compared to 12.1% nationally. The employment status of those at least 15 was 411 (56.8%) full-time, 111 (15.4%) part-time, and 12 (1.7%) unemployed.

== Education ==
Hope School, in the south, is a co-educational state primary school for Year 1 to 6 students, with a roll of 87 as of July 2026. It opened in 1852.

Ranzau School, in the north, is also a co-educational state primary school for Year 1 to 6 students, with a roll of 108 as of July 2026. It opened in 1848. There was an earlier school established in 1845. Lessons at Ranzau School in the early years were in German.

== See also ==
- Great Taste Trail
- Hope railway station
