= Brightwater, Arkansas =

Community in Arkansas, US

Coordinates: 36°25′04″N 94°03′25″W

Brightwater is a community in Benton County, Arkansas, United States.

It is the location was generally along the Springfield to the Fayetteville Road, where it crossed Little Sugar Creek, located at N Old Wire Road/Benton Cty Rd. 67, south of US 62 and was listed on the National Register of Historic Places from 2005 to 2009..

A segment of the Springfield to Fayetteville Road was ordered to be constructed in 1835 by the Washington County court to start at Fayetteville, routed northward about 45 miles to the Missouri state line. About 8 miles south of the state line, the road descended into a valley, and with a crossing at Little Sugar Creek, settlement began to evolve. Before 1837, the road was in use, providing one of several routes for the migration of the Cherokee along the Trail of Tears.

Area histories began to recognize and note the community.c. 1840. A post office called Brightwater was established in 1882, and remained in operation until 1907.

The route of the Springfield-Fayetteville Road connecting to routes in Missouri eventually established a major route to the southwest between St. Louis, Missouri, and Fort Smith, Arkansas, Fort Worth and El Paso, Texas, Tucson in the Arizona Territory, and ending in San Francisco. It was this route that John Butterfield was awarded a contract to transport U.S. Mail, establishing the Butterfield Overland in 1858.
