= Kawatiri railway station =

Defunct railway station in New Zealand

Kawatiri
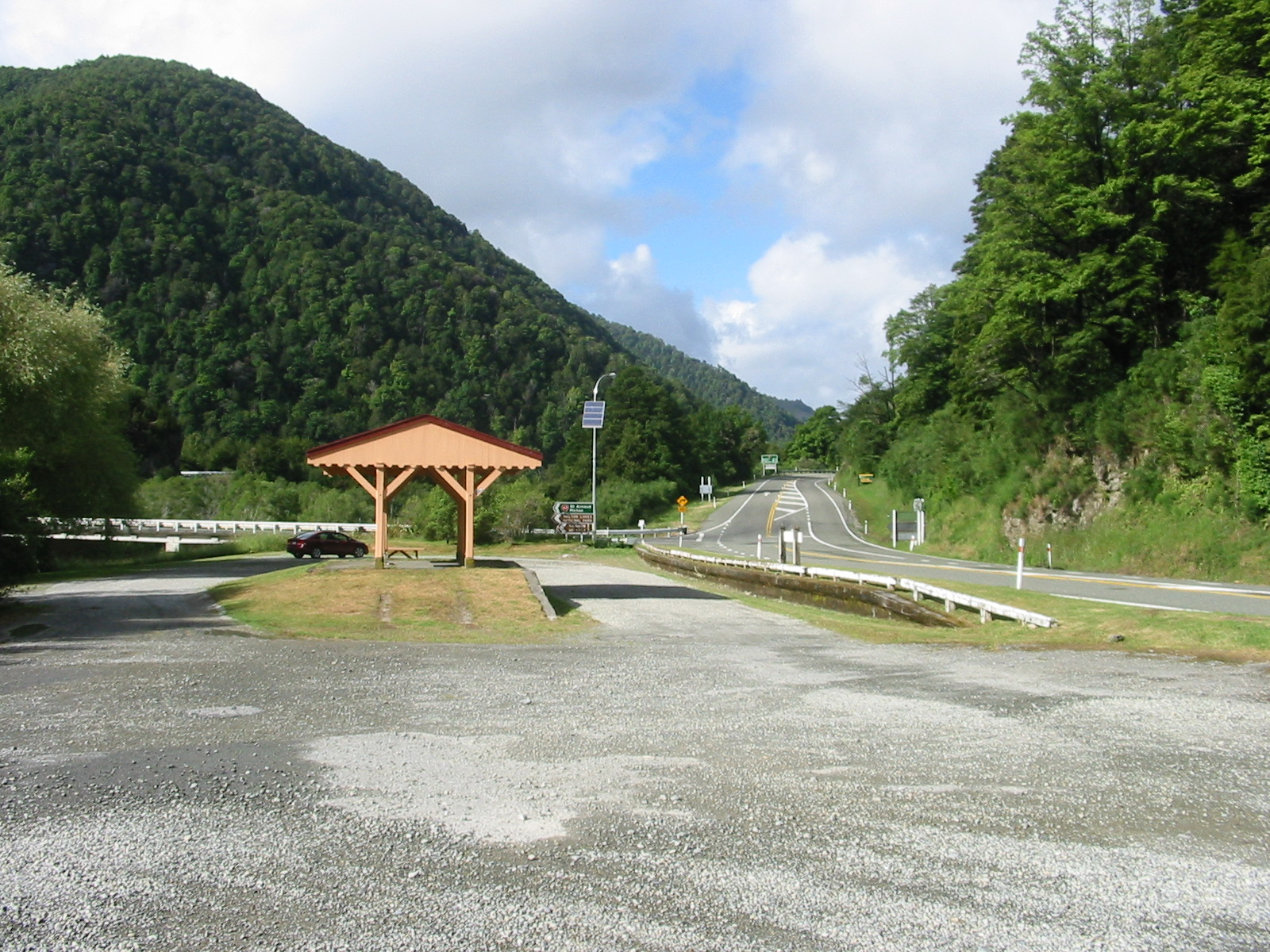
- Remnants of Kawatiri Station, 2007.

General information
- Location: State Highway 6 / State Highway 63, Kawatiri
- Coordinates: 41°41′37.28″S 172°37′2.92″E
- System: New Zealand Government Railways (NZGR) regional rail
- Owner: Railways Department
- Line: Nelson Section
- Platforms: Single side
- Tracks: Main line (1); Siding (1)

Construction
- Parking: No
- Cycle facilities: No

History
- Opened: 21 June 1926
- Closed: 12 July 1931
Location

Kawatiri railway station was a rural railway station that served the small settlement of Kawatiri in the Tasman District of New Zealand’s South Island. Kawatiri is located on State Highway 6 at the junction with State Highway 63. It was one of 25 stations on the Nelson Section, and marked the furthest extent of Railways Department operations on the line. Kawatiri was one of the shortest-lived stations operated by the Railways Department: 5 years, 21 days between 1926 and 1931. The original intention was to extend the line to Inangahua Junction and Westport. Only the Westport-Inangahua section was built in the end.

Kawatiri is situated in the Hope River gorge, with the Kahurangi National Park to the west and the Hope River to the east. State Highway 63 crossed the station yard via a bridge at the northern end of the yard, before crossing the Hope River and continuing on into the Wairau Valley. State Highway 6 passed by the station to the west between the station yard and the national park.

Facilities at this station included a platform, loading bank, goods shed, siding, passenger shelter and equipment shed.

== History ==
During the construction of the Kawatiri Section, as it became known, the Pikomanu workers camp was established in the Hope River gorge, between what would become the Kawatiri tunnel and the station yard. The camp was in use between 1920 and 1926 when the Kawatiri Section opened, and housed, at its greatest extent, over 300 labourers, tradesmen and other support staff.

Kawatiri was never of any great importance to the Railways Department, initially being served by only two trains a week on Mondays and Wednesdays from its opening on 21 June 1926. It was always considered to be a flag station, and this was reflected in the level of service offered there. Though goods could be consigned to Kawatiri if they were to be collected the same day, outbound goods still had to be consigned at Glenhope.

This initial timetable did not last long before being rescinded, after which the Railways Department only operated heavy goods trains to the station. Those living at Kawatiri or further south and wanting to travel north by rail had to catch a train at Glenhope. Apart from these scheduled services, the only other trains to pass through Kawatiri were Public Works Department construction trains and occasional passenger excursions.

An economic depression led to the establishment of a Commission in June 1930 to review the construction and operation of NZR lines around the country. Of the Nelson Section, it reported in December 1930 that construction of the line should be one of the public works to be "suspended", which is what happened in January 1931. The line up to this point had only been open as far as Kawatiri Station, so the halt to all construction work brought a sudden end to all regular traffic through the station. Several months later on 12 July 1931 the line between Glenhope and Kawatiri was also closed.

Following the closure of the Kawatiri Section, the road across the station yard was realigned as the bridge was no longer required.

== Today ==
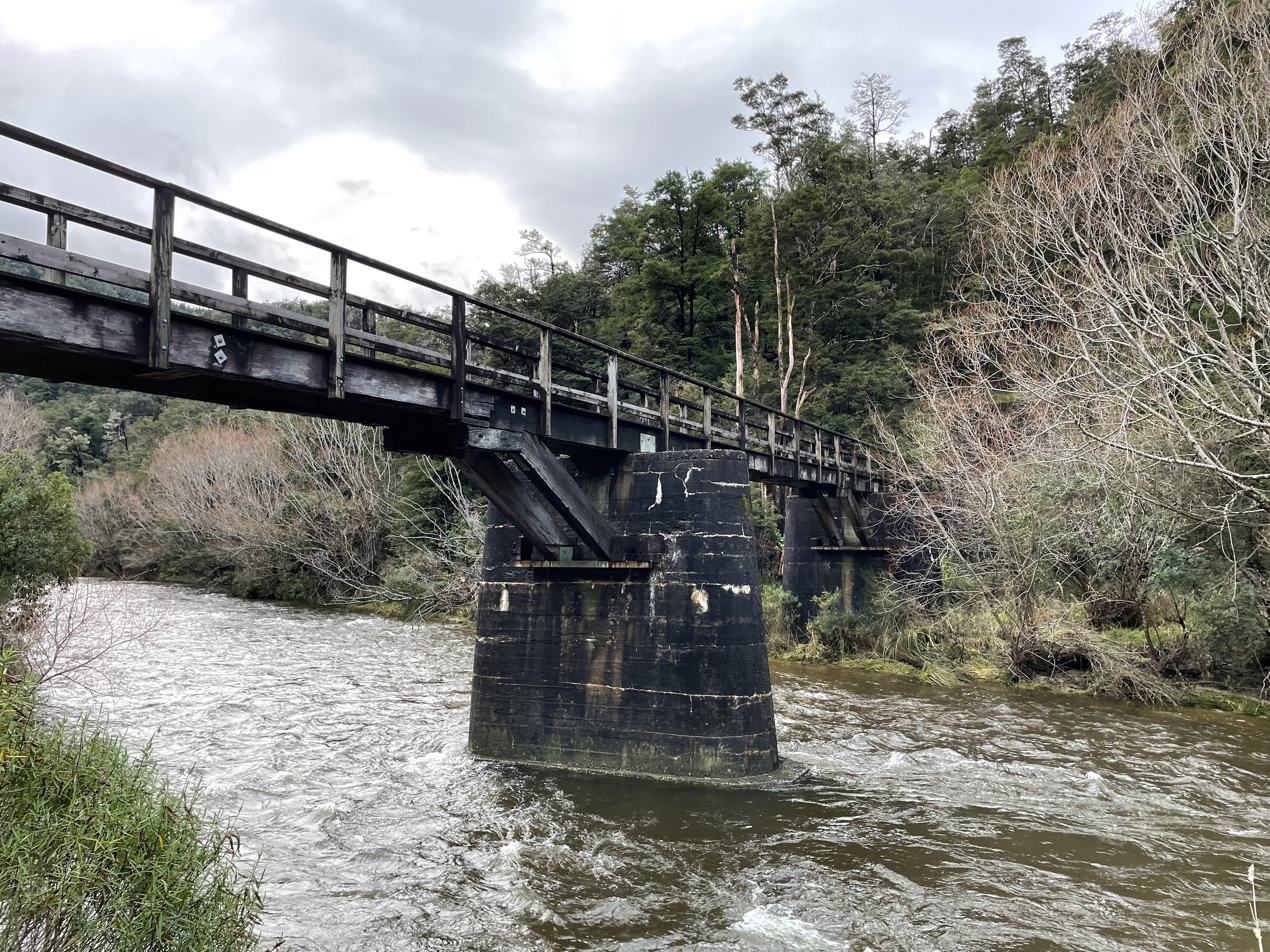
Pikomanu Bridge over the Hope River near Kawatiri, adapted for pedestrian use.

A public walkway encompassing the Kawatiri Tunnel has been established between Pikomanu Bridge and Kawatiri, including footbridges where river crossings are required.

At the Kawatiri station yard, a platform still exists, where the Department of Conservation has erected informational signboards.

A bronze memorial plaque commemorates the 1944 accident when an aircraft operated by Air Travel Ltd crashed nearby in bush on the slopes of Mount Hope with the loss of two lives.

== See also ==
- List of Nelson railway stations
