= Brightwater railway station =

Defunct railway station in New Zealand

Brightwater

General information
- Location: Ben Nevis Crescent, Brightwater
- Coordinates: 41°22′36.08″S 173°6′31.53″E
- System: New Zealand Government Railways Department regional rail
- Owner: Railways Department
- Line: Nelson Section
- Platforms: Single
- Tracks: Main line (1); Crossing loop (1); Siding (1); Private siding (1)

History
- Opened: 1876-01-29
- Closed: 1955-09-03, due to closure of the Nelson Section
Location

Brightwater railway station was a rural railway station that served the town of Brightwater in the Tasman district of New Zealand’s South Island. Brightwater is located on State Highway 6, approximately midway between the towns of Richmond, to the north, and Wakefield, to the south. It was one of 25 stations on the Nelson Section, and existed from 1876 to 1955.

Facilities at this station included a Class 5 Vogel-era wooden station building, a platform, goods shed, crossing loop, siding (through the goods shed), station master's house, and windmill.

To the east of the station, there was a level crossing where the line crossed Ellis Street before it headed into the curve that led to the straight to Hope and crossed the Waimea River. To the west, the line crossed Lord Rutherford Road, the then main highway south through the area. On the opposite side of Ellis Street there was the two-storey Everett Brothers’ store and G. Robertson’s sawmill and workshop.

== History ==
The first section of the Nelson Section to be built was from Stoke to Foxhill, as the route for this part of the line was the first to be confirmed while the route out of Nelson was still being debated. This included the construction of the Brightwater railway station, which was opened along with the first completed section from Nelson to Foxhill on 29 January 1876.

Brightwater was an officered station until staff reductions in 1888 led to the removal of the station master's position. The station was, thereafter, an unstaffed flag station, though the station master's house was used by other staff based at Brightwater, such as surfacemen. The station building also housed a Post & Telegraph Office until 1887 when the Post Office relocated. Morning trains crossed at this station until 1948.

In 1946, W. L. Lawry Ltd leased half an acre of land next to the station on which it constructed a second lime crushing plant to complement the primary plant it already had in the Lee Valley. This necessitated the extension of the crossing loop and siding, in order for a private siding to the crushing plant to be laid. Production of bagged lime began in September 1946, with approximately 20% of the output being transported by rail in L class wagons to Nelson. A stand-off between the limeworks and NZR Head Office ensued in the 1950s when, with the introduction of bulk handling of lime, the company requested facilities be provided for loading the lime, but NZR wanted guarantees that bulk loads would be dispatched. By the time a clam-bucket tractor was provided in 1955, it was too late to help save the railway.

The Nelson Progress League visited this station in 1949 to gather evidence for its campaign to encourage government investment in the railway. The station master's house was cited as an example of the dilapidated state of the railway, which led to its repair and repainting.

The windmill, built in 1896, was used to pump well water into a vat for watering the steam locomotives. It remained in use until the late 1940s when it was replaced by an electric pump.

This station was closed for three days in June 1954 until the Nelson Section was granted a reprieve, and closed permanently on 3 September 1955.

== Today ==
The former Brightwater station yard and limeworks site is now part of a housing subdivision. The limeworks was sold by Lawrys in the late 1970s, and it was closed altogether in the early 1980s.

To the south, State Highway 6 now occupies part of the railway formation from the intersection of Lord Rutherford Road to midway between the intersections of Robertson Road and Simmonds Road / Roughton Lane.

== See also ==
- List of Nelson railway stations
