= Nelson Railway Society =

Heritage railway in New Zealand

Coordinates: 41.261876°S 173.295755°E

The Nelson Railway Society operates a short heritage railway line in the Founders Heritage Park, Nelson, New Zealand.

The society has recovered and now utilises station buildings from a couple of former stations on the Nelson Section, including the Tui Railway Station building.

The society uses a DSA class diesel locomotive on running days, and restored a W^{F} class steam locomotive W^{F} 403. 403 has not yet been steamed nor is in usual service due to its six driving wheels being unable to negotiate the curves of the society's line.

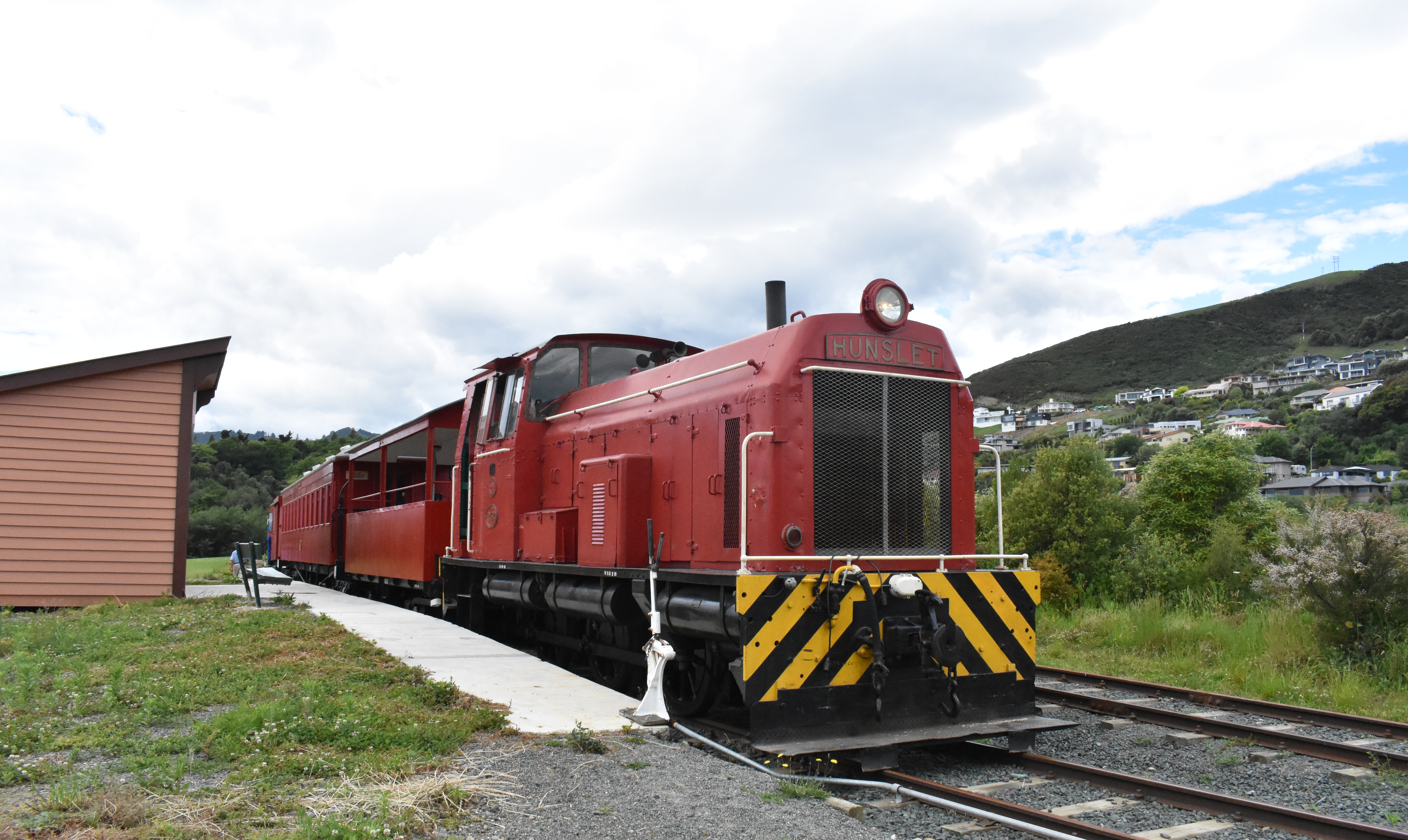
Dsa 262 outside Tui Station.

The society was originally incorporated as the "Grand Tapawera Railroad Company" with the intention of establishing and operating a line on the original formation of the Nelson Section near Motupiko.

== Rolling Stock ==
Class	Number	TMS number	Year built	Builder	Status	Description
W^{F}	403	n/a	1907	NZR Hillside workshops	Restored but not operational	Ex-NZR 2-6-4T steam locomotive.
D	143	n/a	1874	Neilson Brothers	Under restoration	Ex-NZR 2-4-0 steam locomotive, worked on the Nelson Section with D 144. Leased from Silver Stream Railway. To be returned to SSR August 2019. May have originally been named Trout however this has not been proven.
D^{SA}	262	660	1957	Hunslet	In service	Ex-NZR 0-6-0D diesel shunting locomotive.
T^{R}	62	275	1950	Drewry	In service	Ex-NZR 0-4-0D diesel shunting tractor.
Rm	1	n/a	2009	Nelson Railway Society	In service	Society-built open-side railcar. Seats 14 passengers.
A	173	n/a	1898	NZR Hillside Workshops	In service	43' 9" wooden clad passenger carriage.
A	785	n/a	1903	NZR Addington Workshops	In service	47' 6" wooden clad passenger carriage.
F	491	898	1928	NZR Hillside Workshops	In service	30' wooden clad guard's van.
Nb	527	308	1975	NZR Otahuhu Workshops	In service	Originally built as a Jc sheep wagon, converted to an open-side passenger carriage by Nelson Railway Society.
Z	647	3968	1962	NZR Addington Workshops	Display	Wooden box wagon, used for model railway display.
H	1565	1184	1959	Hurst Nelson	In service	Flat deck wagon, originally built as a cattle wagon.
Nc	1137	5749	1966	NZR Otahuhu Workshops	In service	Flat deck wagon.
Q	1401	7247	1953	Charles Roberts	In service	Flat deck wagon.
W	1213	1377	1960	NZR Addington Workshops	In service	Wooden insulated box wagon.
La	42641	72682	1948	NZR Addington Workshops	In service	Steel high-side wagon.
Yb	Unknown	n/a	Unknown	Unknown	In service	Ballast wagon. Number unknown. YB 610 is written on the wagon.
Yc	785	1123	1961	NZR East Town Workshops	In service	Ballast wagon.
Lb	2969	n/a	1890	Unknown	Stored	Wooden high-side wagon, chassis only. Builder unknown.

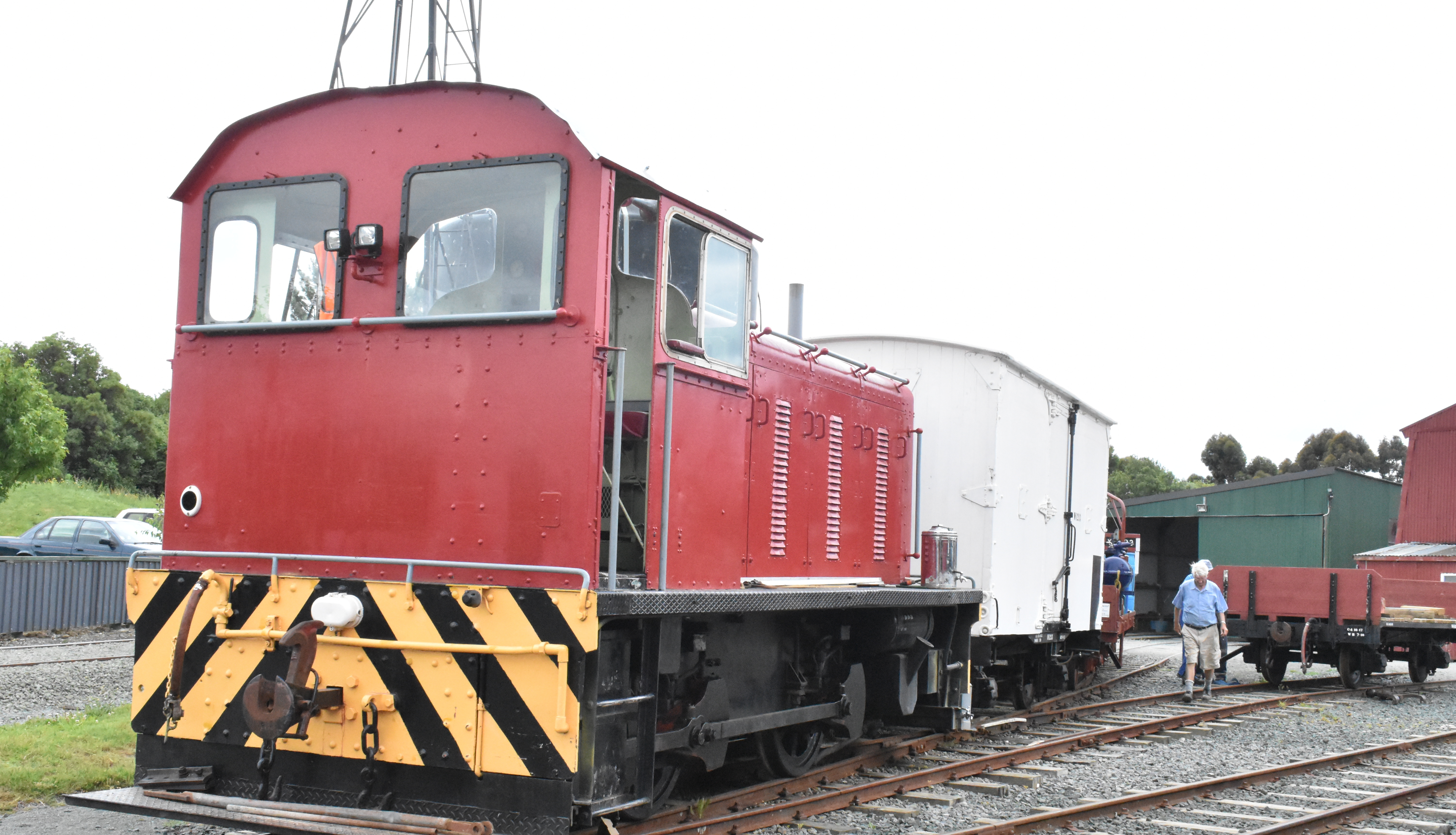
Tr 62 with a work train.

Map
