= Nelson section =

Railway line in Tasman, New Zealand

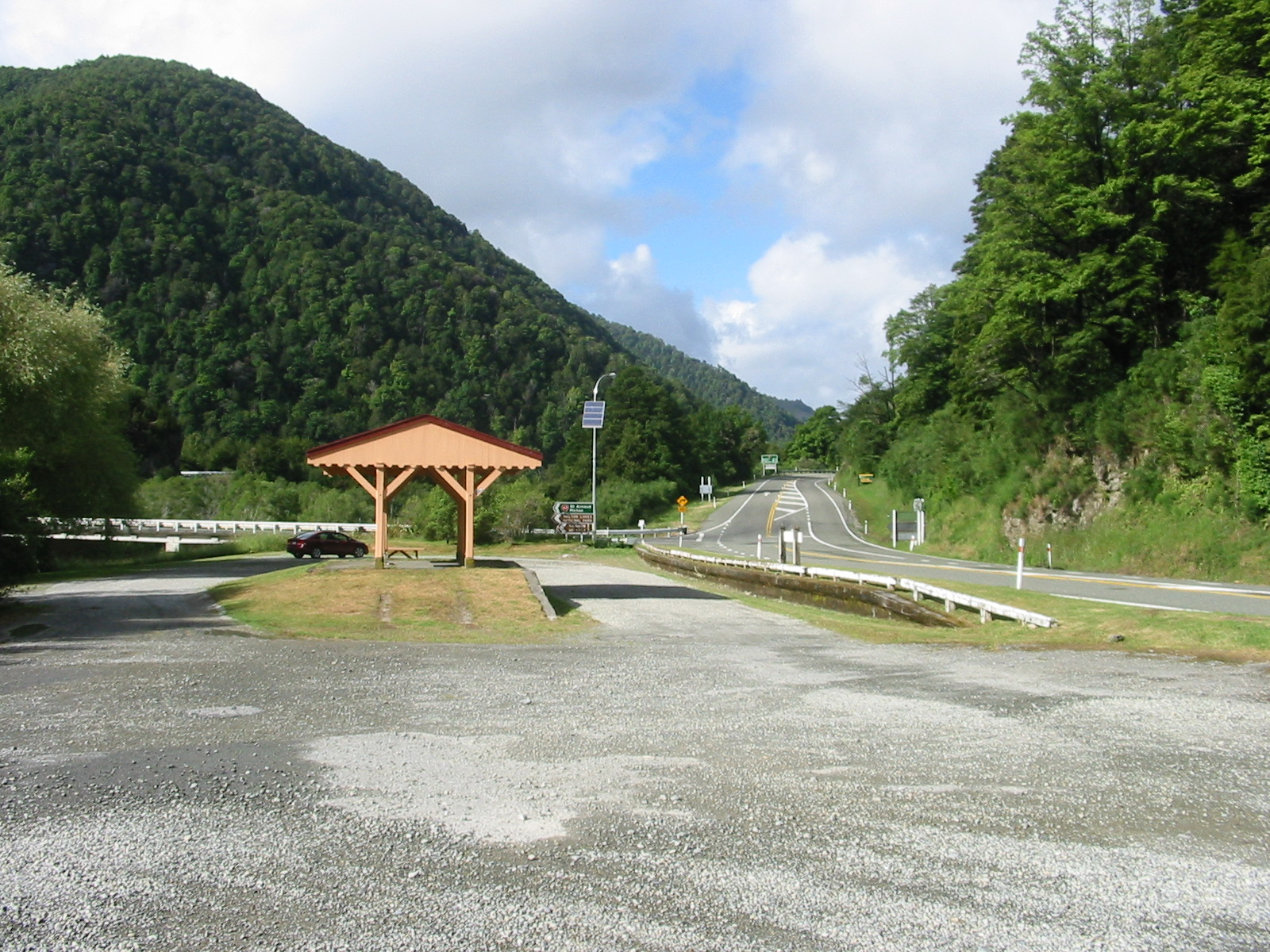
- Remains of the Kawatiri station, 2007

Overview
- Status: Closed
- Owner: Railways Department
- Locale: Tasman District, New Zealand
- Termini: Port Nelson; Glenhope (1912 to 1926, 1931 to 1955) Kawatiri (1926 to 1931)
- Stations: 25

Service
- Type: New Zealand Government Railways regional rail
- Operator(s): Railways Department; Public Works Department

History
- Opened: 29 January 1876 (Nelson to Foxhill); 17 May 1880 (Nelson to Port); 25 July 1881 (Foxhill to Belgrove); 2 March 1899 (Belgrove to Motupiko); 6 August 1906 (Motupiko to Tadmor); 18 December 1908 (Tadmor to Kiwi); 2 September 1912 (Kiwi to Glenhope); 21 June 1926 (Glenhope to Kawatiri); 17 June 1954 (freight only)
- Closed: 12 July 1931 (Glenhope to Kawatiri); 13 June 1954 (passengers); 3 September 1955 (freight)

Technical
- Line length: 96.64 km (60 mi) (to Glenhope); 103.20 km (64.1 mi) (to Kawatiri)
- Number of tracks: Single
- Character: Rural
- Track gauge: 3 ft 6 in (1,067 mm)

Map

The Nelson section was an isolated government-owned railway line between Nelson and Glenhope in the Tasman district of New Zealand's South Island. While part of the New Zealand Government Railways, the section was never connected to the national railway network, although there were plans to do so. The line operated for 79 years between 1876 and 1955. Unusually for an isolated line, there were passenger and freight services for most of its existence, with freight outlasting passenger services by just a year.

This line is noteworthy for several reasons, including being the last completely isolated section of the government-owned railway network; gaining a reprieve after being closed for the first time until being closed for a second – and final – time; and, its route was chosen to serve existing communities in Nelson's hinterland rather than being constructed to open up new areas for development or serve specific industries.

== History ==
Nelson was founded as a New Zealand Company settlement in 1842, and became the capital of the Nelson Province following the creation of the provinces of New Zealand in 1853. Initially, provincial councils were responsible for building railways, and the first in Nelson was the privately funded and constructed railway of the Dun Mountain Company, opening in 1862. The first steam-operated railway opened between Christchurch and Ferrymead in 1863.

=== Background ===
It was the early success of the Dun Mountain Company that first prompted suggestions of a railway to link Nelson with the West Coast town of Cobden. In May 1862, Fedor Kelling, the Nelson Provincial Council member for Waimea West, requested a feasibility study for a line from Nelson to the Wairoa River bridge. When the council agreed, Abraham Fitzgibbon – previously associated with the Dun Mountain Railway – was appointed to do the work. He chose a route that had the line leaving Nelson via Jenkins Hill (modern-day Bishopdale), and also planned a branch line to the end of Parkers Road where he envisaged a branch line terminating at a port. Though the select committee examining the idea was left in no doubt as to the economic benefits of such a railway, they were equally cognizant of the debt that would be required to fund it.

It was only later that, on reports of a gold rush on the west coast, the matter was considered again by the council, enthusiastically supported by Fedor Kelling. The committee decided on a line to Cobden, with a branch line to Westport, along the Buller River. Financing for the project was to come in part from a land grant scheme, whereby 4,000 hectares (9,900 acres) of land would be granted for every 1.6 kilometres (0.99 mi) of progress on the line. Later that year, the General Assembly passed the Nelson, Cobden and Westport Railway Land Act, authorising the reservation of the necessary land.

It was decided to engage the services of an expert to examine the matter. For this task, Henry Wrigg, an Auckland civil engineer, was hired to survey the 320 kilometres (200 mi) route. He completed the work between September 1867 and January 1868 in appalling weather, which did give him the advantage of seeing the area at its worst. When he presented his report to the council the following 1 April, he enthusiastically supported the project and was confident that construction should take only three years with work starting simultaneously at Nelson, Cobden and Westport.

Though the financial requirements of such a project were beyond the means of both the provincial and central governments at the time, it was suggested that a British firm be engaged to finance, construct and own the line as had already been successfully done in other developing nations. As a further incentive, Wrigg suggested that the Brunner coal mine be given to the successful tenderer as an immediate and certain source of income.

When the authorisation legislation was submitted to the General Assembly, it did not include a provision for the gifting of the coal mine, which the provincial council was reluctant to relinquish, nor was Wrigg included in the deputation that was sent to England to solicit interest in the project.

John Morrison, a London-based businessman, was appointed by the council to act as their agent in accordance with the authorising Act. Assisted by former colonial governor Sir George Grey and engineer Fitzgibbon, he set about trying to find financiers to fund the project. Though he met with much early disappointment and scepticism, he eventually found such a group headed by Alexander Brogden. Morrison wrote of the good news to Superintendent Oswald Curtis who was able to put the letter before the council two months later.

This was as far as the project got thanks to the intervention of two unrelated events. On the day the contract was due to be signed, 19 July 1870, France declared war on Prussia, an event that caused such uncertainty that the investors were no longer willing to commit to such an undertaking. In June, it was announced that the Colonial Treasurer, Sir Julius Vogel, planned to borrow £10,000,000 over ten years to finance the Great Public Works policy. It was expected that well-funded government contracts would soon be available thus depriving the Nelson scheme of its former lustre for the private investor.

=== Construction ===
The line was opened in stages to regular traffic over a period of 50 years between 1876 and 1926. This included several periods of inactivity, as well as a change in the route after Belgrove had been reached.

==== Nelson–Foxhill ====
Before work could begin on the Nelson–Foxhill section of the route, it was necessary to pass through the General Assembly empowering legislation, which could not happen before a survey had been completed. This was done by August 1871, when the surveyor Albert Austin was able to forward his plans and estimates to the Colonial Secretary, William Gisborne. He attached an appraisal in which he noted that the Stoke–Foxhill section would present few problems and that the hard part would be in choosing a route out of Nelson, for which he had chosen two routes for consideration:

- Beach Line: Cost estimated at £77,361, and would depart from a terminus in Trafalgar Street for the Port, from whence it would run along the shoreline until turning in towards Stoke. Features would include a 460 metres (1,510 ft) seawall and a 95 metres (312 ft) tunnel at Rocky Point. Advantages would include little contact with town property and direct access to the port.
- Jenkins Hill Line: Cost estimate £82,344, and would begin in Hardy Street, run through the Toi Toi Valley, and over Jenkins Hill (now Bishopdale) to Stoke. This route would have required a substantial amount of money be paid to affected landowners over whose town property the line would have to pass. Other features of this route would include steep gradients and sharp curves in the saddle area. As constructed, there was a steep 1 in 35 grade up the Bishopdale Hill.
- Beach Line (variant): Very similar to the Beach Line proposal, except for the Rocky Point tunnel being replaced with a longer 700 metres (2,300 ft) tunnel which would pass through more stable ground. While more expensive up front, it was expected that this would save more money in the long run.

On the basis of this survey, a bill could now proceed through the House of Representatives. It was therefore with much delight in Nelson when the local newspaper, The Nelson Evening Mail, announced on 10 November:

We have great pleasure in announcing the fact that the construction of the Nelson and Foxhill Railway was yesterday agreed to in the House of Representatives by a majority of 33 to 4.

By the end of the month, the Nelson section, along with 3 other lines, had been authorised by legislation. It would be a year before the Governor would officiate the "turning-of-the-first-sod" ceremony.

Austin embarked on the process of preparing the working surveys and estimates, which would take him until August 1872 to complete. Despite this progress, there was unease within Nelson province with regard to the fact that contracts had yet to be awarded for work on the line. When it was announced on 10 August that nine contracts had been let for railway construction but that the Nelson line was not among them, Nelsonians were left to wonder if the government had broken its promises. As it turned out, the problem for the authorities was in deciding on a route out of Nelson. While Austin was tasked with investigating the matter further, tenders were called for the 21 kilometres (13 mi) section from Stoke to Foxhill and steps were taken to acquire the necessary land. The successful tenderer for the Waimea contract was a local firm by the name of Scott and Robinson.

Though the official turning of the first sod ceremony took place on 6 May 1873, sub-contractors who started at the end of the line began work a month earlier on 7 April. The official ceremony was officiated by Superintendent of the Nelson Province Oswald Curtis who declared the day to be a public holiday. Around 3,000 people attended the proceedings at Saxton's field, about 1 kilometre (0.62 mi) south of Stoke.

The choice of a route for the line out of Nelson still had to be made and, though it was well known that the authorities favoured the Jenkin's Hill route, the Inland Communication Committee was convinced that the coastal route was the better option. In order to resolve the matter, the Minister of Public Works was prevailed upon on 28 July by a deputation from Nelson to make a decision. On 7 November the committee received a letter stating that the Jenkin's Hill route had been chosen.

The contract for the Nelson–Stoke section was let on 16 March 1874 to the Bray Bros. on which they started work nine days later. One of the few noted benefits of this route was the discovery a month later in one of the cuttings of a small seam of coal.

The line presented few engineering problems and included only one sizeable bridge, but by early 1875 there was still some formation work unfinished. By this time, however, rolling stock was being built, rails were being laid, and station buildings erected. Progress improved noticeably after the first engine was fired on 3 May and work trains could then be used to haul rails and ballast to the railhead as it advanced.

The Nelson station was built where the Toi Toi and Washington Valleys met on what had been an undeveloped mudflat. To make the land usable, 15,000 cubic metres of fill was excavated from a hill off Hardy Street to form the yard. Once the land was prepared, sleepers and rails which had been in storage in St. Vincent Street were laid and a class 4 Vogel-type station building was erected.

==== Opening of the Line ====
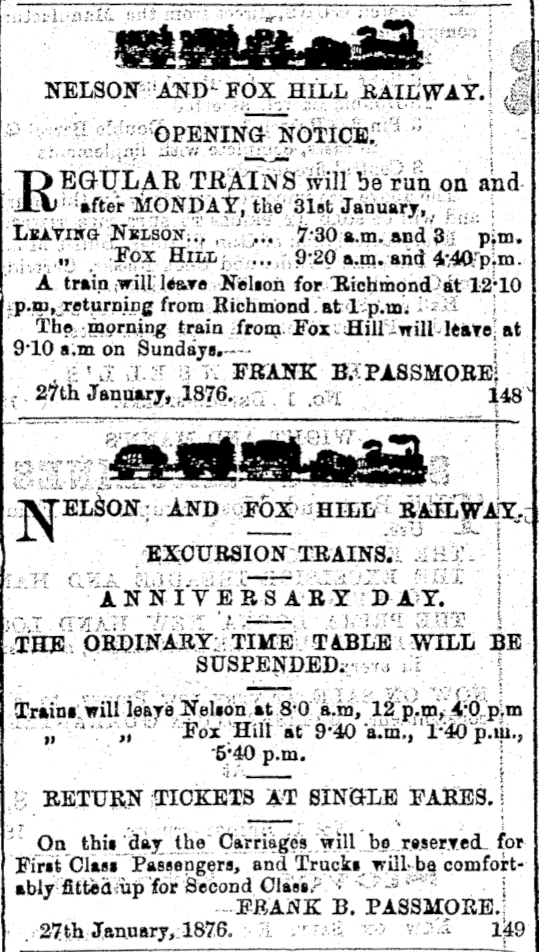

As the line neared completion, trial runs were conducted and on 17 November 1875 30 passengers were conveyed to the Wakefield terminus as guests of Austin. In early December, another group was conveyed to Richmond to evaluate seven recently completed carriages.

With only minor work still to be completed, the line was due to be opened in January 1876. There was little local enthusiasm, and with a Mail report on 27 January exclaiming: "People have been so deceived, misled and disappointed with regard to this line that its opening is not likely to call forth any great display of enthusiasm", it is no surprise that there was such little effort put into marking the occasion.

Accounts of the opening were reported in both the Nelson Evening Mail and The Colonist. The Evening Mail reported, ″That portion of the Nelson and Foxhill railway commencing at the Toi-Toi Valley mudflat and terminating at Wakefield, a distance of about 20 miles, was formally opened by his honor the Superintendent [Frank Bailey Passmore] on Saturday″ (January 29, 1876). An initial service for invited guests only departed Nelson at about 11am, and ″arrived at the Wakefield terminus at a quarter to one″ (Evening Mail) or ″arrived at the station called Fox Hill at about twenty minutes to one o'clock″ (The Colonist). A ribbon-cutting ceremony was held at the station. After lunch, the return train journey began at 3:30pm, arriving back in Nelson at 4:45pm.

Another Nelson Evening Mail article states, ″The Nelson and Wakefield Railway is to be opened to the public on Monday″ (31 January 1876). The article continues with a table of stations and fares:

Scale of Fees
	1st Class		2nd Class	
	s.	d.	s.	d.
Bishopdale	1	0	0	9
Stoke	1	6	1	3
Richmond	2	6	1	9
Hope	2	9	2	0
Wairoa	3	3	2	3
Spring Grove	3	6	2	6
Wakefield	4	3	2	9
Foxhill	5	0	3	3

The Wairoa station was later renamed Brightwater (along with the town that it served). The Foxhill station was located some distance from the locality of Foxhill. When the line was extended further south, a new Foxhill station was built, and the original station re-named Wai-iti. The initial schedule had two round-trips from Nelson to Fox Hill, and a third service from Nelson to Richmond.

The lack of enthusiasm for the railway continued to be expressed in the Evening Mail. A letter from a Richmond resident complained about the 2s 6d fare, ″at the rate of nearly fourpence per mile. By coach now the fare is only 2s.″ In another letter, by Francis Holder, advocates for his coach service over the railway; his many issues including a dig at the location of the original Foxhill station, ″I don't pretend to take you to Foxhill and drop you two miles short of it.″

==== Nelson–Port ====
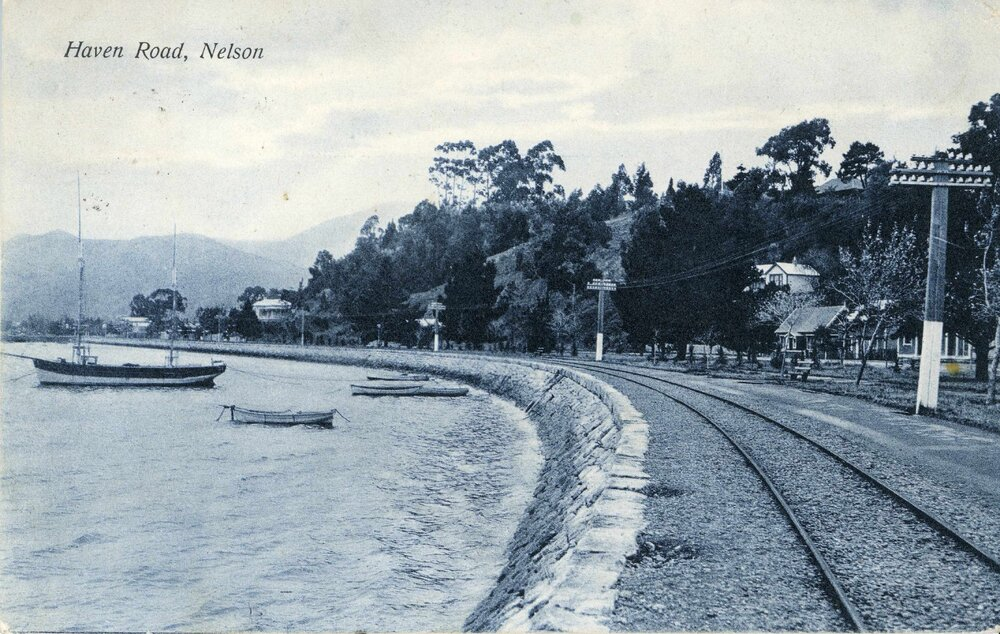
Nelson Section Railway alongside Haven Road

It was soon realised after the opening of the Nelson–Foxhill section that the inconvenience of transferring goods traffic from trains to drays to transfer it to the port at Nelson station, was enough for many merchants in Nelson and surrounding areas to avoid the railway altogether and to ship their goods directly to the port by road. This loss of freight traffic from the railways gave sufficient motivation to the New Zealand Railways for them to make the port section the next to be added to the line.

On an inquiry made on 1 June in parliament, it was made known that planning for the port section was in progress, but returns from the railway could not justify any further extension of the line to the south at that time. There were, however, complications that had slowed this process, primarily the insistence of the Nelson City Council on widening Haven Road along which the line would run. This was to involve considerable additional expense and reclamation works, a cost which was sufficient for the government to be tardy in its progress.

Although the Nelson Provincial Council had come to an agreement with the government for the extension to be built and had committed £8,000 to the project, the issue of widening Haven Road meant that there were insufficient funds to complete the work. Negotiations to overcome the impasse continued through 1877 until May 1878 when it was announced that the project was to be suspended indefinitely. In response, a local deputation left for Wellington on 4 June to prevail upon the authorities the need for the extension and was rewarded the following day when a contract was awarded for the 1.2 kilometres (0.75 mi) of formation. The government-subsidised the work to help cover the cost of widening the road and allowed the use of prison labour. Work began in July and the line was ready for use on 17 May 1880, coinciding with control of the Government Wharf passing to the Railways Department.

==== Foxhill–Belgrove ====
In 1879, William Blair, Chief Engineer for the South Island, was asked to examine and report on proposals that had earlier been suggested by engineer Thomas Foy for connecting Picton and Blenheim to Canterbury. By the time he reported back to the Railway Committee on 21 June in favour of his preferred east coast route, Nelson authorities were already celebrating the fact that the contract for the 5 kilometres (3.1 mi) Foxhill–Belgrove section had been let to Peter Day on 26 May 1879. The Railway Committee was already making plans for the next 16 kilometres (9.9 mi) of the line beyond Belgrove in anticipation of the completion of surveying work along the then planned route to Tophouse via Blue Glen.

Following a change of government in late 1879, and with an approaching economic depression, two railways commissions were appointed in May 1880 and October 1882 to examine the future of railway lines around the country, both planned and in progress. In its report presented on 26 July 1880, the first commission recommended that the almost complete Foxhill–Belgrove section be completed but that the Belgrove–Tophouse section be postponed.

Formation work was completed by June 1880, at which time further contracts were let for plate laying and station buildings. When the new section opened for business on 25 July 1881, an adjusted timetable was introduced and the station that had previously been known as Foxhill became Wai-iti with the new Foxhill station established between Wai-iti and Belgrove.

==== Belgrove–Motupiko ====
It was not until 9 September 1890 that the New Zealand Midland Railway Company put out a call for tenders for the construction of the next section of the line from Belgrove to the Motueka Valley. The successful tenderer was a Wellington-based contractor Allan Maguire, who was awarded the contract in early October.

One local who took particular interest in the progress of construction was Francis Trask, Mayor of Nelson from December 1890 until 1900. From 1891, he arranged annual visits to the construction site for his councillors. By the time they visited the site in March 1892, the Spooners Range tunnel had been advanced to 640 metres (2,100 ft) at the northern end and 240 metres (790 ft) at the southern end with only 520 metres (1,710 ft) remaining. It was expected that the tunnel could be holed through by 24 May, but because of delays due to bad weather and a large landslide, this did not happen until 9 June. Work continued on the tunnel through into the following year, with the lining completed on 14 June 1893. The formation up to the tunnel was finished the following December.

It was here that progress stopped. No contracts had been let for the ballasting or plate laying of the formation completed thus far or the continuation of the line beyond the tunnel. The funds allocated to this section of the line had not been fully spent, yet the company in charge of the project was declared bankrupt. In a surprise move, the government seized the company's assets on 25 May 1895 and declared its intention to proceed with the contract on the company's behalf. It was not until November 1895 that work resumed when six men started preparations for the next stage of construction which started in March 1896. Forty men were assigned to complete the contract over the following year. A series of excursion trips were organised for 1 February 1897 to mark the occasion of trains being able to travel through the tunnel.

Because the contracts that had been let thus far terminated just beyond the tunnel, a temporary station was established there, but it was obvious to all concerned that the line would need to be extended to a commercially useful centre beyond this point for the section beyond Belgrove to be viable. Various delays held up further progress, including obtaining records from the defunct New Zealand Midland Railway Company and deciding on the most suitable route, so it was not until November 1898 that trains could use the new extension and 1899 before the entire Belgrove–Motupiko section was handed over to the Railways Department for normal services. Scheduled services from Nelson to Motupiko commenced on 1 March 1899. On 2 March, the General Manager of New Zealand Railways (Thomas Ronayne) and chief engineer (Mr. Lowe) carried out an inspection of bridges, the tunnel and other works along the route.

==== Motupiko–Tadmor ====
After interested parties in the Tadmor Valley successfully prevailed upon the government to choose a longer route through their area rather than the shorter route over the Hope Saddle selected by the Midland Railway Company, work began on the 16 kilometres (9.9 mi) section to Tadmor in July 1901. Locals expected rapid progress, as the only major work on this section was the Motueka River road-rail bridge. It was, however, this part of the job that was to be the source of considerable delays that prevented the opening of this section until August 1906.

Though the bridge itself was finished in good time (in March 1904), it was to be the following October before the approaches were completed by the Public Works Department. The delays frustrated locals to the extent that they made representations to the government over their concerns at the lack of progress. The response was to the effect that there was a lack of resources – both men and money – for the government to devote to railway construction, especially considering all the other railway projects under-way at the time and that Nelson would just have to wait its turn.

The opening date for the section slipped several times, being planned for December 1905, Easter 1906 then 24 May (Empire Day) before finally being set for 6 August. The occasion was not considered to be an official opening, due to the lack of government (ministerial) representation, brought about by the unexpected death of Premier of New Zealand Richard Seddon on 10 June 1906.

==== Tadmor–Kiwi ====
The deviation of the line through the Tadmor Valley required three authorisations from the government before the work could proceed, those being: Motupiko–Tadmor, Tadmor–Tui, and Tui–Glenhope. A work camp was established at Kaka, including a school for the children, at which the men were based while they worked on the extension of the line from Tadmor.

By 1908, ballasting and plate laying had reached Kiwi station. This section was handed over to the Railways Department on 18 December 1908.

==== Kiwi–Glenhope ====
Of the three sections of the deviation, the last – to Glenhope – was considered to be the most difficult. It had to pass over the 453 metres (1,486 ft) Tadmor Saddle and cross numerous steep-sided creeks.

In May 1911, the Nelson Chamber of Commerce dispatched 25 of its members to the camp at Kaka to see for themselves why progress was so slow. After being shown around the construction site at the Tadmor Saddle and listening to the troubles that had been encountered with the unstable ground and earthworks, they were assured that despite the amount of work remaining, the project was nearing completion.

After several dates were suggested and rumoured, the line to Glenhope was officially opened on 2 September 1912 at a ceremony organised by the Nelson Chamber of Commerce. It was attended by the new Ministers for Railways and for Public Works (Roderick McKenzie), as well as a large entourage of politicians from both houses of parliament. Also well represented were residents from all parts of the province, especially the Murchison district.

==== Glenhope–Kawatiri ====
Prior to leaving office, the Minister Roderick McKenzie obtained parliamentary authorisation for the work to continue and tried to ensure that progress was maintained on it. Despite his best efforts, the Kawatiri section was fraught with delays: work commenced in December 1912; work stopped in April 1913 due to a lack of funds; work resumed in November 1914, but because of the demands of the war, manpower gradually dwindled to the point where work stopped again in February 1917 at which time a caretaker was appointed to maintain the site until such time as work resumed. In all, 5 kilometres (3.1 mi) of formation had been completed.

Work resumed again in 1920, with a start made on the Kawatiri tunnel using crews based at a new construction camp at Woodhen Bend. Local enthusiasm did not translate into significant official support, with only 30 men beginning work on the tunnel and access bridges, and only primitive tools and methods available to start the work. The headings had to be driven for 60 metres (200 ft) before a compressor and pneumatic drill were provided. The 185 metres (607 ft) tunnel was finished in 1923, coinciding with the promised arrival of new construction crews fresh from working on the Otira tunnel.

Despite expectations that the section would be ready by the end of June 1925, the Railways Department did not take control of it until May 1926.

==== Kawatiri–Gowanbridge ====
Construction of the Kawatiri–Gowan section began in 1924. About this time, the Pikomanu work camp was also relocated to Gowanbridge. Progress was steady, and by 1927 construction crews working along the whole of the planned route only had to complete a couple of cuttings before the line could reach Gowanbridge.

With rumours in official circles that there was no desire for the line to be extended beyond Gowanbridge, the workforce dwindled to around 60 men in 1928. The project was revitalised, however, after the December elections when the new government promised to borrow £10,000,000 to complete unfinished railways. With the increased pace, the line was completed through to Gowanbridge the following year, including all the Gowanbridge station buildings and yard.

==== Beyond Gowanbridge ====
Work did not stop at Gowanbridge, with the frenetic pace continuing on to the next section. Several new work camps were established beyond Gowanbridge, the largest of which was at Grassy Flat.

Grassy Flat was where the busiest construction site was located, where a long embankment had to be built. Two shifts worked at this site both day and night. Large cuttings were being made at two other work sites, also employing night shifts.

The Murchison earthquake of 17 June 1929 diverted the railway construction crews on to the more immediate and urgent matter of restoring communication and road links with the affected areas. It was fortunate that there was little impact on the work done thus far on the railway formation, but there was some concern that as the railway progressed through the region that it would be subject to similar dangers.

Formation work was completed to the 132 kilometres (82 mi) mark at the Mangles River, with ballasting and platelaying due to begin within a month or two. The line through to Murchison, at 136 kilometres (85 mi), was expected to be open by mid-1931. Surveys beyond Murchison were completed to 141 kilometres (88 mi) (permanent line) and 150 kilometres (93 mi) (trial line), and bush clearing had reached 159 kilometres (99 mi). Succinctly put, completion of the Murchison section was within sight and work was beginning on the Inangahua section. Such was the situation on 19 December 1930 when the construction crews began their Christmas vacations. On 4 January 1931, they were informed that all work was suspended with immediate effect. The work never resumed.

Local member of parliament George Black opposed the decision to suspend construction of the railway, which ran through his electorate, and was later expelled from his party after refusing to vote for the government's budget.

Without being opened at least to Murchison, the Glenhope–Gowanbridge section could never hope to be profitable. Several months after this announcement, on 17 July 1931, the Glenhope–Kawatiri section was closed and Glenhope once again became the terminus of the line, a distinction it would hold for the rest of its existence. The rails of the disused section were overtaken by nature until finally being lifted and reclaimed for use elsewhere in 1942.

=== Operation ===
All trains on the Nelson section were operated by the Railways Department, apart from Public Works Department operated construction trains. Because of its isolated status, it was often low on the list of priorities to receive the benefits of new technologies. The line closed before the coming of the diesel age, and consequently, the line was only ever operated with steam-hauled trains.

==== Freight ====
The primary role of the Nelson section as a purveyor of freight transport was to convey the products of Nelson and its hinterland to Port Nelson where it could be shipped to other markets and to bring in supplies, mainly of an agricultural nature for use in farming. Stations were generally established in small, existing settlements that usually served large farming districts and often had private sidings for industrial customers that had located their operations near the railway, as well as goods sheds and loops where loaded wagons would wait to be picked up by the next scheduled freight service. As the railway was being built, new sections were usually opened when the cost of operating it could be justified by the expected returns from freight traffic on the new section.

Some of the primary product shipped out of Nelson via the railway included berry, vegetable, hops and fruit crops, wool, timber, livestock, and meat from the freezing works at Stoke from 1909. Due to the isolated nature of the Nelson section, it was also necessary to ship in all of the fuel, parts and other supplies required to run the railway itself. Because there was no locally available source of coal in a sufficient quantity, a collier brought in supplies of West Coast coal every few months from whence it was shipped by rail either to local merchants in Nelson or to the coal stages at Nelson, Belgrove and Glenhope.

The period 1900 to 1919 were the most prosperous years for the railway. Goods tonnage climbed steadily, helped also by the war, necessitating the delivery from Wellington of several additional wagons in 1913. The reign of Thomas Edwards as stationmaster-in-charge from September 1906 to March 1915 was particularly successful. During this period, freight revenue trebled, an additional £10,000 of rolling stock was brought into service including two new locomotives, Fa 315 in 1912 and Wf 404 in 1915.

==== Passenger ====
Passenger services were mostly operated as mixed trains which drew many complaints from passengers subjected to the frequent shunting of goods wagons at every intermediate station along the route. Along with the complaints came requests for a passenger-only express service, which was trialled over the summer of 1909 at the behest of then stationmaster-in-charge, Thomas Edwards. There is no evidence, however, that this service became a regular feature of the summer timetable in the years that followed.

===== Staff picnic trains =====
One custom that was adopted on the Nelson section was the Railwaymen's Picnic, an idea that originally came from Otago. This annual event was open to all railway staff and their families who could attend for free, though the general public was also invited. The last such picnic excursion was held, with special permission, the day the railway first closed, on 13 June 1954.

===== Excursion trains =====
The first excursion train on the Nelson section was run on 23 February 1876 to a steeplechase held at Wakefield, shortly after the first section opened. Special trains to various events thereafter became a popular activity for the locals, especially during summer, and becoming an annual event for organisations such as clubs, social groups, schools and businesses who arranged picnics for their members, staff or students. Popular locations for these excursions included Snowdens Bush, Faulkners Bush, Baigents Bush, Wai-iti Domain and Glenhope. Some events were popular enough to last for many years as annual events to which revellers were conveyed by train, including the New Years Day picnics and Sunday School picnics (the last of which was held on 19 February 1955).

The Children's Gala Day excursion, first held on 15 December 1923, was intended to be an end-of-year celebration for school students throughout the region. So successful was the first event that they were thereafter held annually in either 1 November or December, steadily becoming more popular, with around 3,500 to 4,000 attending in 1931. The last Gala Day was held in 1932, after which the organising committee decided not to hold the event in 1933 due to the effects of the economic depression. When the economy recovered, the Gala Days were not revived.

One public excursion of special note was the Jaycee Excursion, organised for the day before the line was due to close for the first time, on 12 June 1954. Billed as "the last train to Glenhope", it attracted widespread attention from across the country and 400 eager passengers. Many railfans, from as far away as Christchurch and Auckland, expected it to be their last opportunity to experience rail travel on the Nelson section. Sizeable crowds were on hand at Nelson to see it off and at Glenhope to meet it. After the day out at Glenhope, the train arrived back in Nelson to be greeted by a crowd of 5,000 and exploding track detonators.

===== School trains =====
One of the more important services that the railway would come to provide was to transport students from the various small settlements along the line to their secondary education in Nelson. By 1880, there were 30 boys travelling daily into Nelson, and they were joined in 1883 by girls attending the newly opened Nelson College for Girls. The number of students using the trains increased noticeably in 1903 when concessions became available for those studying at the colleges in Nelson. This led to the number of girls increasing to 43 in 1914, 50–60 in 1918, and 77 in 1932 with, it is believed, a similar number of boys during that period. The increase in student patronage led to more stringent rules regarding the seating arrangements and movement about the train. Carriages were allotted to the colleges and a third for the public as well as any students from the convent and technical school. Trains #1 in the morning and #8 in the afternoon (#10 on Fridays) were made up with freight wagons at the front, followed by the boys carriage, the girls carriage, the public carriage and the guard's van. Movement between the first two carriages was prohibited.

For many years, the speed and condition of the "school trains" and the behaviour that was reputed to occur on them were the subject of complaints from the parents of the school students, and demands made for alternative transport to the schools to be arranged. Though the complaints were somewhat muted during the war, they were renewed with vigour after the war's end. The mother of a new family settled in Wakefield with four school-aged daughters initiated, in June 1947, a petition calling for the school trains to be replaced by buses, for which she received strong local support. The petition was presented to the local MP, and a year later it was announced that from term two 1948 the school trains would cease running. The final such trains ran on Friday, 13 August 1948, ending a 65-year history. The following Monday a new timetable was introduced and the students were conveyed to school in New Zealand Railways Road Services buses.

=== Demise ===
Several events contributed to the eventual demise of the Nelson section. Though it has been argued that the Nelson section was never given a real chance to succeed, or that it was the victim of an outright conspiracy to get rid of it by those in authority, it was often the victim of circumstance that accumulated to the point where it was no longer tenable to keep it open.

==== 1931: Cancellation of all works beyond Glenhope ====
The Great Depression of the 1930s was portended in the 1920s when the prices fetched for primary produce – a significant part of the New Zealand economy of the time – declined to the point where many producers were forced from the industry. The incoming United Party-led government of 1928 headed by Sir Joseph Ward promised to turn around the fortunes of the country, largely by borrowing. When Ward was forced to retire in May 1930 due to ill health, his successor – George Forbes – was given responsibility for a massive budget deficit. The response was to cut government expenditure, to which end a commission was established in June 1930 to review all railway lines.

The commission reported that the Nelson section was making substantial losses which would only increase with the extension of the line, and recommended that services be reduced with closure of the line from Belgrove to Kawatiri if losses continued. The report also listed the section to Inangahua as a line on which works should be "suspended" which was duly carried out in January 1931. Even after the commission's suggestions were enacted, goods traffic continued to decline, decreasing 20% between March 1931 and March 1932, due in part to the loss of construction traffic. The measures had some positive effect, reducing the losses on the line from £18,000 to £12,000 for the financial year ended March 1932, saving the line from closure for the foreseeable future.

==== 1949: Proposed completion ====
In 1949, the then Labour Government announced that it had decided to complete the line from Glenhope to Murchison as soon as resources permit. The government was defeated at the 1949 election in November.

==== 1952: Royal Commission on New Zealand Railways ====
In 1952, a Royal Commission was established to investigate and report on all matters pertaining to the assets and operations of New Zealand Railways. This elicited responses from various parties in the Nelson region with vested interests, including a deputation that submitted a demand that "the gap" be closed to allow the Nelson section to reach its full potential, as well as those – primarily from the road transport industry – who wanted to see the railway closed.

The commission's report included lists of those lines that should be closed and those that should remain under review. The Nelson section was not listed under either category, even though it may as well have been, for the effect of the report was to lead to a significant decline in goods traffic which halved within a year and decreased by two-thirds within two years as customers and patrons abandoned rail. For the financial year ended 31 March 1954, only 8,056 tons of goods traffic was carried, the lowest in nearly 70 years. Timber and cattle traffic declined by 60%, though sheep were still being carried in reasonable numbers, despite being down by 18%. Reported revenue is only half that of 1952.

The end came on 26 April 1954 when Minister of Railways, Stan Goosman, announced that all operations on the Nelson section were to be "suspended shortly". The losses of £25,000 per year were no longer sustainable, and the minister promised that the money saved would be used to improve the region's roads.

The government announced on 3 June 1954 that the railway would close on 13 June. In response, the Nelson Progress League organised a protest rally for 5 June to be held at the Church Steps. That day, a special train was run to Glenhope and return to collect protesters intent on joining the rally in Nelson. In all, a crowd of 5,000 gathered to prevail upon the government to grant the railway a reprieve. Resolutions were passed calling on the government to honour its promise from 1949 to connect the railway to the West Coast.

==== 1954: Reprieve ====
The protest made a political impact; cabinet decided on the following Monday that in order for the Nelson section to remain open, it would have to carry a minimum of 25,000 tons of freight annually. A challenge was issued to the people of Nelson to provide a guarantee by 31 July 1954 that such a target could be met. The Progress League responded, and four days after closure the line was reopened.

On 20 July, the Progress League readied its 12-page report for presentation to the government. It included guarantees for 28,815 tons of freight but requested that improvements be made including bulk handling facilities for coal, fertiliser, lime and timber traffic. The guarantees were accepted by the government and it consequently granted a one-year reprieve.

Some of the requested improvements resulted in a new timetable being introduced including four daily weekday trains, a private siding to a sawmill at Hope, the provision of a tractor at Nelson to assist with the unloading of lime, and the addition of 17 new wagons from Blenheim. However, these changes arrived too late to be of much use; the tractor arrived 7 months later, and the new wagons did not start arriving until May 1955. That same month, the Progress League conceded that the guarantees would not be honoured, with only 12,500 of the promised 28,815 carried to date. Though the performance of the railway did improve, it was not enough, and on 15 August 1955 the Prime Minister announced that the railway would close on 3 September. At just after 16:00 on Friday 2 September, the last scheduled train on the Nelson section completed its journey.

==== 1955: Demolition ====
The Parliamentary Select Committee concurred with the decision to close the line. It was hoped that the work could begin immediately and be completed within six months. There were last-minute petitions and protests organised by the Progress League and direct action from some locals that disrupted the first attempt to demolish the line; Sonja Davies and other local women staged a six-day "sit-in" on the tracks at the Kiwi Station.

Special trains were assembled at Nelson consisting of carriages to provide offices and accommodations for the staff and wagons to haul the scrap. The demolition crews began their work at Glenhope on 21 November 1955, and by the end of the week, the Glenhope station was no more. The original expectation that the work could be completed in six months proved to be too ambitious, as for much of the railways' length there was limited site access, the need to also lift sidings or to not obstruct level crossings to allow for the passage of vehicular traffic. The lifted rails and sleepers were hauled back to and stored in the Nelson station yard pending disposal. Many of the sleepers were sold by tender, while some of the rails ended up at other railway projects around the country. The last rail was symbolically lifted on Friday 21 December 1956.

== Stations ==
There were 25 stations on the Nelson section, though Gowanbridge was never used in revenue service. The shortest-lived station was Kawatiri, closed in 1931 after only 5 years and 21 days of service. All stations handled passenger traffic until passenger services were cancelled in 1954, and most also handled freight traffic. Most were closed with the line on 3 September 1955. Of most, no obvious signs remain. The exceptions (1995) were Tui, Wai-iti, Glenhope, and goods shed at Belgrove.

== Proposals ==
Even before the Nelson section opened, there were plans for a rail connection from Nelson to ports on the West Coast and from there to Canterbury to facilitate trade between the two regions. The Nelson section was just the start of what was intended to become a mainline connection from the region to the West Coast and beyond. There were various proposals for the route of the Nelson section, as well as other proposals to connect Nelson by rail to various points on the South Island rail network, none of which came to fruition.

== Today ==
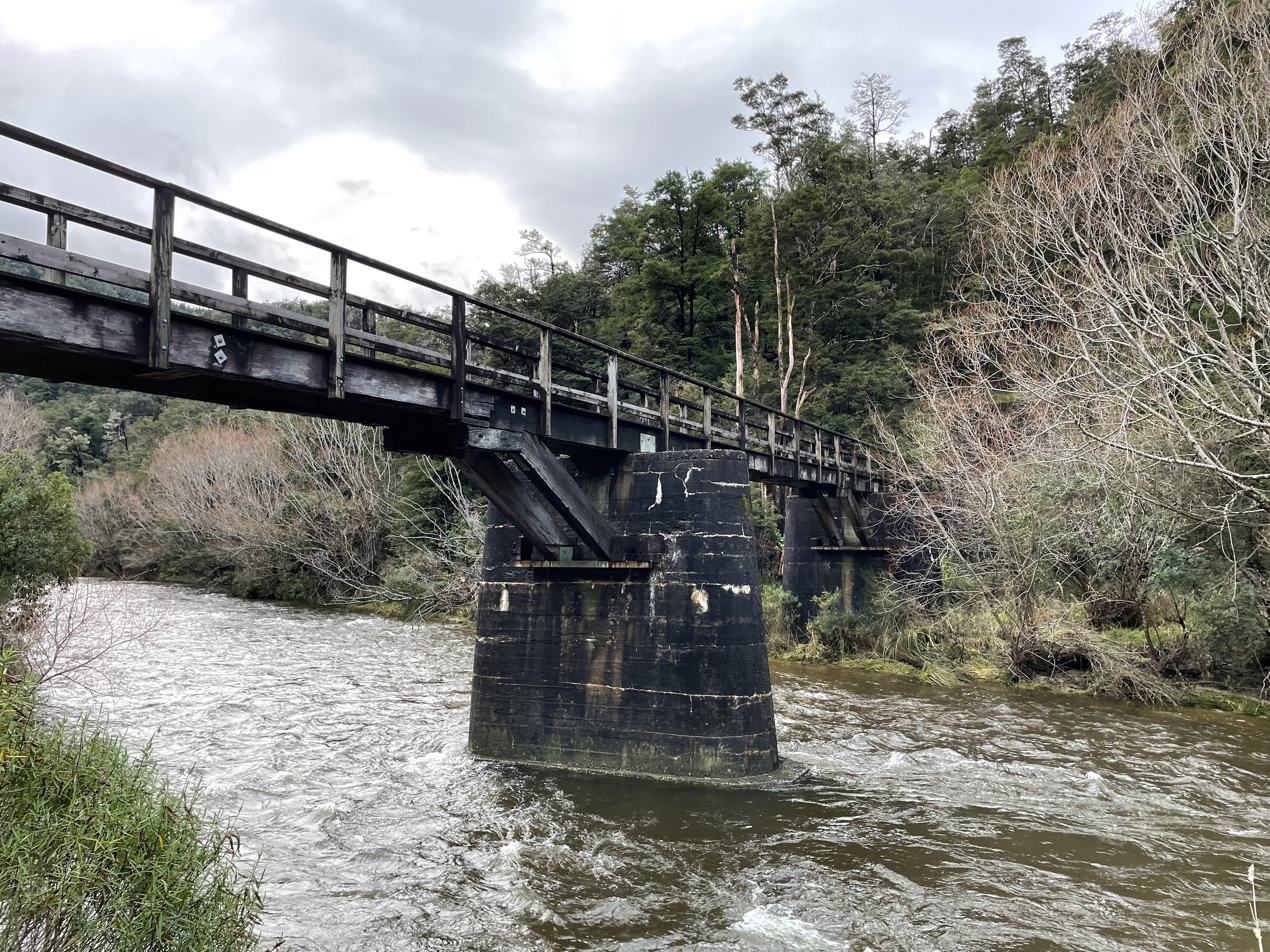
Former railway bridge over the Hope River near Kawatiri, converted for use as part of a short walking track

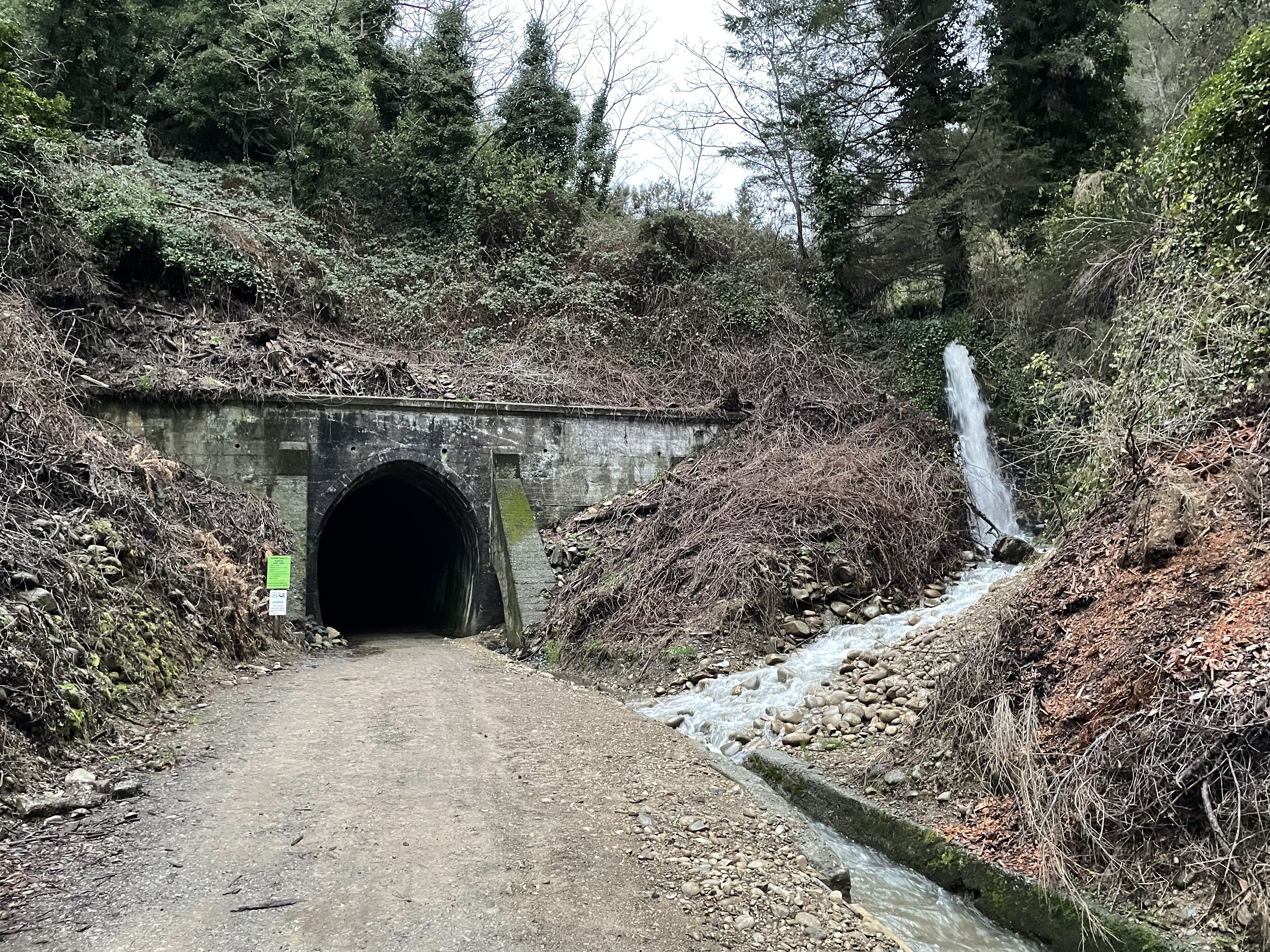
The western portal of the tunnel under Spooners Range

Though in various places road improvements or other development have obliterated the original railway formation, the route can still be followed for much of its length.

The old Nelson station yard has been developed since the 1990s, now containing several commercial premises including a new Fire Station. A plaque outside the Fire Service building is now the only reminder at the site of its former association with the railway.

At the south end of St. Vincent Street, the railway formation can be seen veering off to the left on the climb to the Bishopdale Saddle to join the railway reserve. At Appleby, the road overbridge is still in place, crossing the still clearly visible rail formation. The old Annesbrook Road overbridge was demolished in 2000, and modern road improvements have used parts of the rail formation between Stoke and Richmond.

At the site of the former Spring Grove station, locals have erected the station's old signboard and a railway crossing road sign as an acknowledgment of the site's railway past. Platforms, shelters and displays have been built at the sites of the former Tapawera and Kawatiri stations for the benefit of visitors. The Belgrove windmill has been restored and is maintained by the Department of Conservation.

As of 1998, original station buildings were still standing at Foxhill, Belgrove, Tui, and Glenhope where the station building – converted for use as a farm shed – stands alone in a paddock that was once its station yard.

Both the Spooner's Range and Kawatiri tunnels still exist and are part of public walkways. On 17 April 2016 the Spooner's Range tunnel was permanently opened to the public as part of the Tasman's Great Taste Trail. Previously it was only accessible by appointment.

The Nelson Railway Society, originally incorporated as the Grand Tapawera Railroad Company with the intention of establishing and operating a line on the original formation near Motupiko, now operates a short line in Founders Park, Nelson. They have recovered and now use station buildings from a couple of former stations on the Nelson section, and operate rolling stock from, or at least of the same class or vintage as that used on the Nelson section.

A proposal to rebuild the line between Glenhope and Port Nelson was mooted in 1995 as part of a branch line revival strategy, but no further progress was made.

== See also ==
- Dun Mountain Railway
