= Blue Lake (Tasman) =

Lake in New Zealand

Rotomairewhenua
- Blue Lake
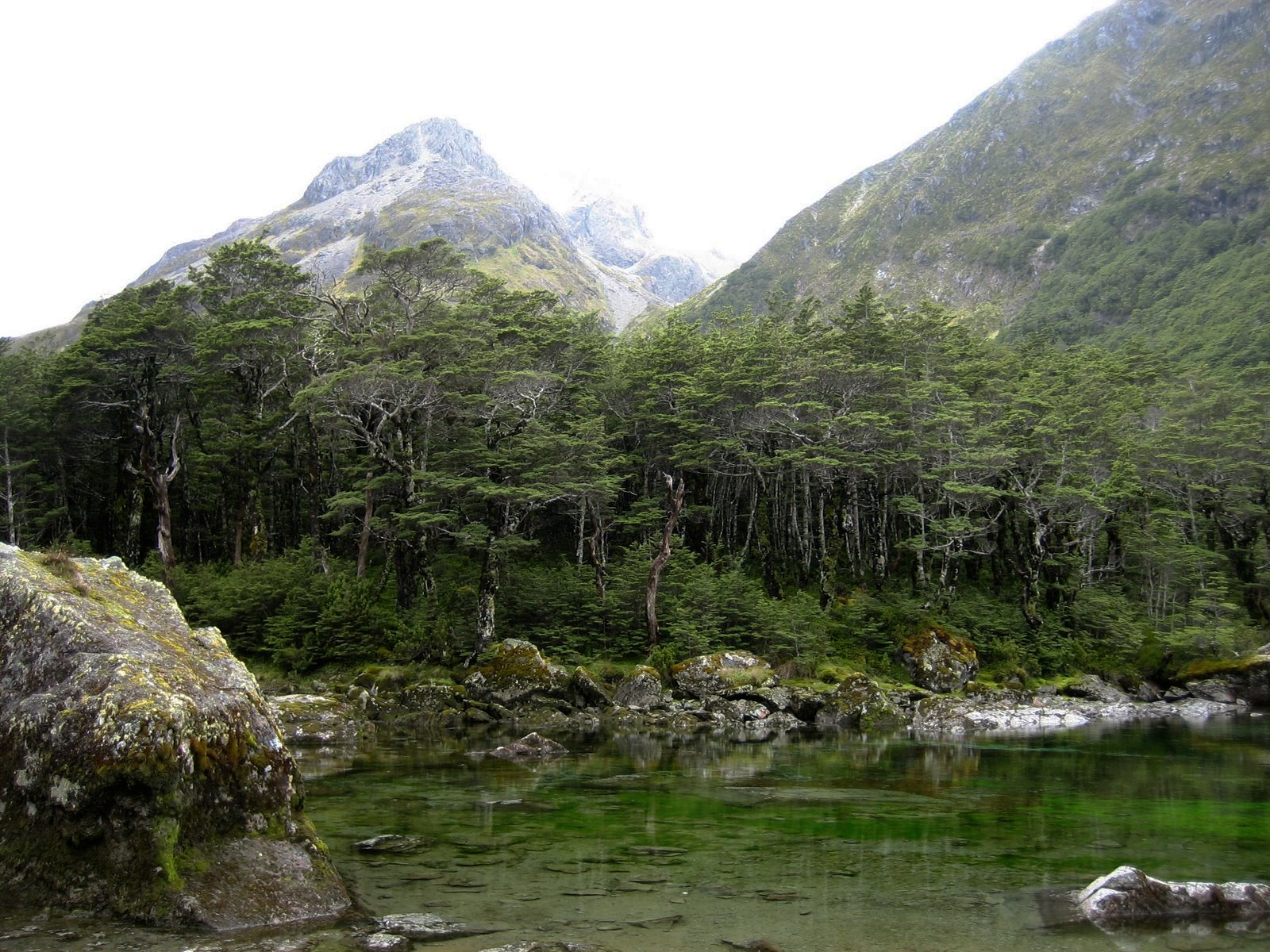
- Blue lake

- Location within South Island
- Interactive map of Rotomairewhenua
- Location: Tasman Region, South Island
- Coordinates: 42°3′30.6″S 172°39′25.6″E
- Primary inflows: springs
- Primary outflows: West Branch of the Sabine River
- Basin countries: New Zealand
- Surface area: 2.45 ha (6.1 acres)
- Average depth: 7 m (23 ft)
- Max. depth: 8.5 m (28 ft)
- Water volume: 180,000 m^{3} (6,400,000 cu ft)
- Residence time: <24 hours
- Surface elevation: 1,180 m (3,870 ft)

Rotomairewhenua / Blue Lake is a small lake in Nelson Lakes National Park, in the northern reaches of New Zealand's Southern Alps. Sacred to local Māori, it has the clearest natural fresh water in the world.

== Description ==
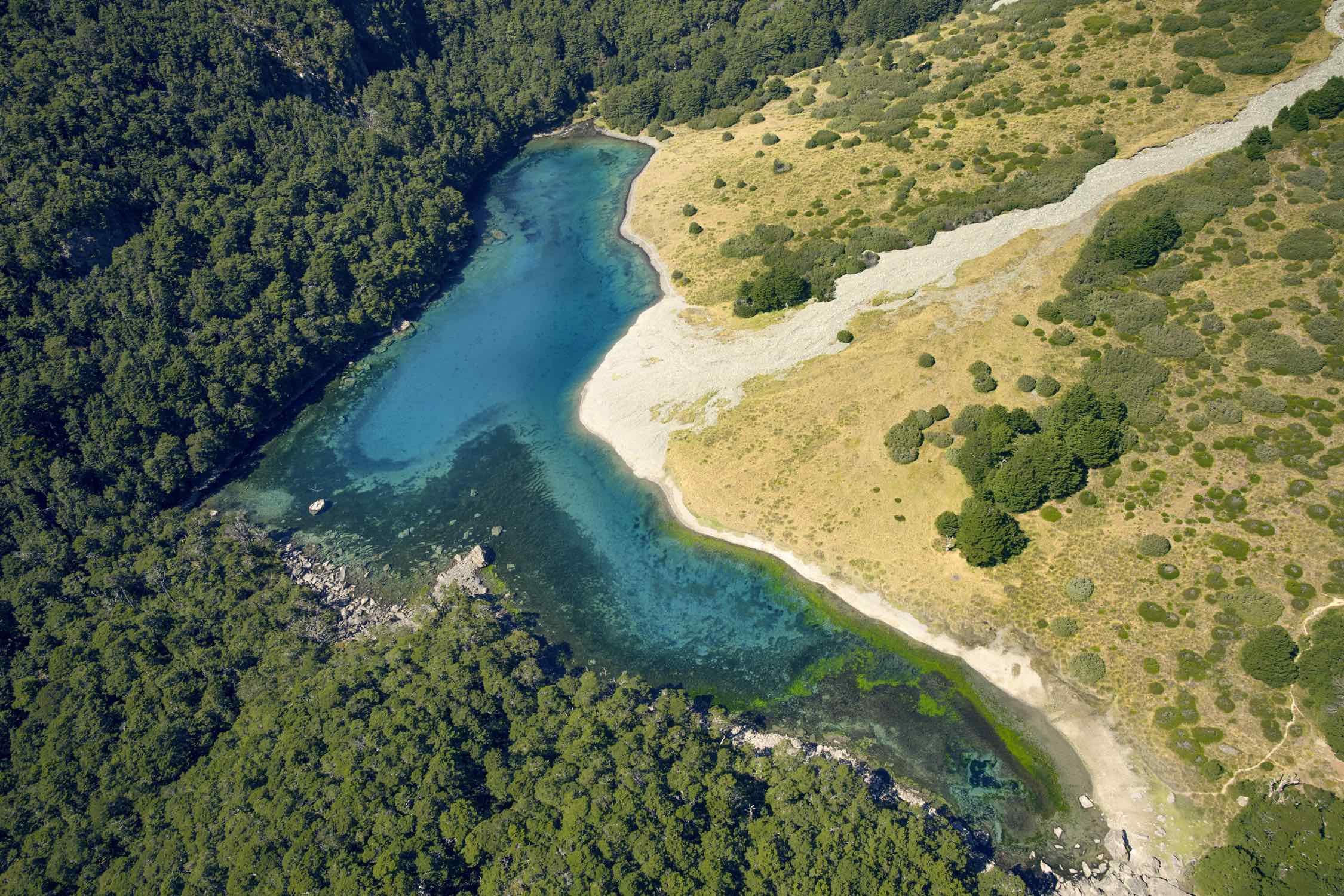
The algae and plant life in the lake make it look blue and green

The Blue Lake is drained by the west branch of the Sabine River, which is part of the Buller River system. It is fed by a short upper segment of the Sabine, which in turn is fed by underground seepage through the landslide debris impounding the much larger Lake Constance. Blue Lake is roughly boomerang shaped, running north then northwest, with each arm of the lake stretching some 200 metres (700 ft). Its waters are cold, ranging from 5 to 8 °C (41 to 46 °F).

=== Clarity ===
The lake has extremely clear water, and is the clearest natural body of fresh water yet reported. A 2011 study found its visibility ranged from 70 to 80 metres (230 to 260 ft), clearer than the 63 metres (207 ft) measured for Te Waikoropupu Springs, a previous record holder. For comparison, laboratory measurements show distilled water has a visibility of approximately 80 metres (260 ft). Scientists attribute the lake water's clarity to its passage underground from Lake Constance, which filters out nearly all the particles suspended in the water. Its clarity reveals water's natural blue-violet colour.

== Facilities and access ==
Blue Lake is most often reached as a side trip from the Travers-Sabine Circuit, although a marked route to the south, over the Waiau Pass and another to the West, via Moss Pass continues beyond the lake. The nearby Blue Lake Hut, with 16 bunks, provides accommodation for more than 700 trampers each year.

== Māori history ==
Blue Lake lies within the rohe (tribal area) of Ngāti Apa ki te Rā Tō. As part of the iwi's 2010 treaty settlement, the lake passed into tribal ownership and was then given back to the Crown. The lake was traditionally used in ceremonies to cleanse the bones and release the spirits of the dead, so they could begin their journey to Hawaiki, and the iwi regard its waters as tapu (sacred). (Blue Lake was used only for males; Lake Constance was used for females.) Its Māori name, Rotomairewhenua, means "the lake of peaceful lands".

In August 2014, the official name for Blue Lake was altered to Rotomairewhenua / Blue Lake, following the Ngāti Apa ki te Rā Tō treaty settlement with the Crown.
