= Arnst River =

- Route of the Arnst River
- Mouth of the Arnst River Arnst River (New Zealand)

Location
- Country: New Zealand
- District: Tasman

Physical characteristics
- Source: Paratītahi Tarns
  - location: about 1,700 m (5,600 ft)
  - coordinates: 41.8962°S 172.84718°E
  - elevation: 82 m (269 ft)
- Mouth: Travers River
  - coordinates: 41°55′58″S 172°48′29″E
  - elevation: about 680 m (2,230 ft)

Basin features
- Progression: Paratītahi Tarns → Arnst River → Travers River → Lake Rotoiti → Buller River → Tasman Sea
- River system: Buller River

The Arnst River in New Zealand is a tributary of the Travers River, which itself flows into Lake Rotoiti, in Nelson Lakes National Park.

The park is at the northern end of the South Island of New Zealand. The Arnst River is named after the champion rower Jacob Diedrich Arnst, known as Richard Arnst or Dick Arnst.
