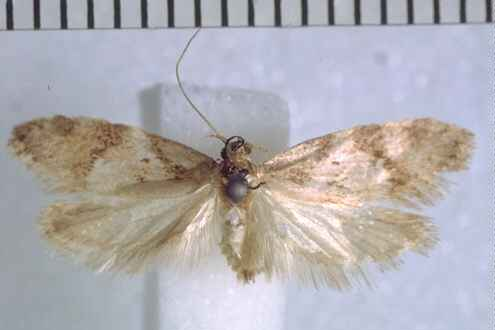
- Male holotype

Scientific classification
- Kingdom: Animalia
- Phylum: Arthropoda
- Class: Insecta
- Order: Lepidoptera
- Family: Oecophoridae
- Genus: Trachypepla
- Species: T. angularis

Binomial name
- Trachypepla angularis (Philpott, 1929)

Synonyms
- Borkhausenia angularis Philpott, 1929

= Trachypepla angularis =

Species of moth endemic to New Zealand

Trachypepla angularis is a species of moth in the family Oecophoridae. It is endemic to New Zealand and has been collected at Lake Rotoroa in the Nelson Lakes National Park in January. This species inhabits mixed native forest.

== Taxonomy ==
This species was first described in 1929 by Alfred Philpott and named Borkhausenia angularis using specimens collected at the foot of Lake Rotoroa in January. In 1939 this species was discussed and illustrated by George Hudson in his book A supplement to the butterflies and moths of New Zealand. In 1988 J. S. Dugdale placed this species in the genus Trachypepla. Dugdale justified this placement saying "the basally strongly arcuate aedeagus and the valval character of angularis accord well with Trachypepla species as figured by Philpott". This placement was confirmed in 2010 by Robert Hoare. The male holotype specimen, collected at Lake Rotoroa by Philpott, is held at the New Zealand Arthropod Collection.

== Description ==
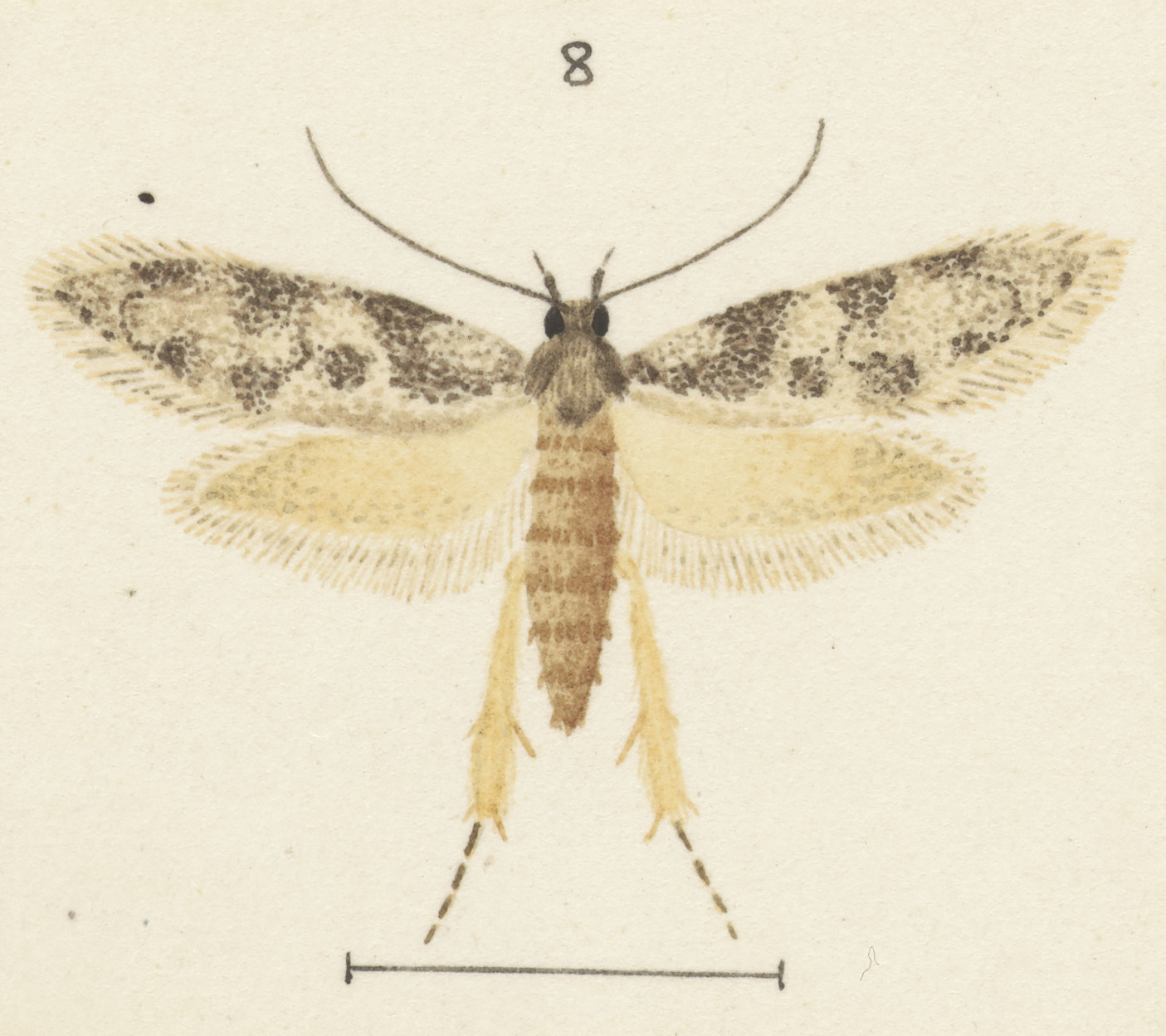
Illustration of female.

Philpott described the adults of this species as follows:

♂ ♀. 16–20 mm. Head and thorax grey. Palpi grey mixed with blackish and ochreous. Antennae grey, ciliations in male 3/4. Abdomen greyish-ochreous, in female mixed with fuscous. Legs ochreous, more or less irrorated with fuscous, tarsi annulated with fuscous. Forewings moderate, costa well arched, apex round-pointed, termen very oblique; whitish-grey; a suffused fuscous bar from costa at 1/3 inwardly oblique to dorsum at 1/4; following this a large triangular whitish area, its apex on costa, enclosing dot-like 1st discal and plical spots; a dark fascia following posterior margin of triangular patch, embracing 2nd discal spot, which is blackish margined beneath with white; a suffused dark patch on costa before apex: fringes grey dotted with fuscous. Hindwings grey, irrorated with fuscous round apex and termen.

Philpott stated that this species was similar in appearance to Tingena seclusa but that T. angularis has more prominent and different markings on its forewings.

== Distribution ==
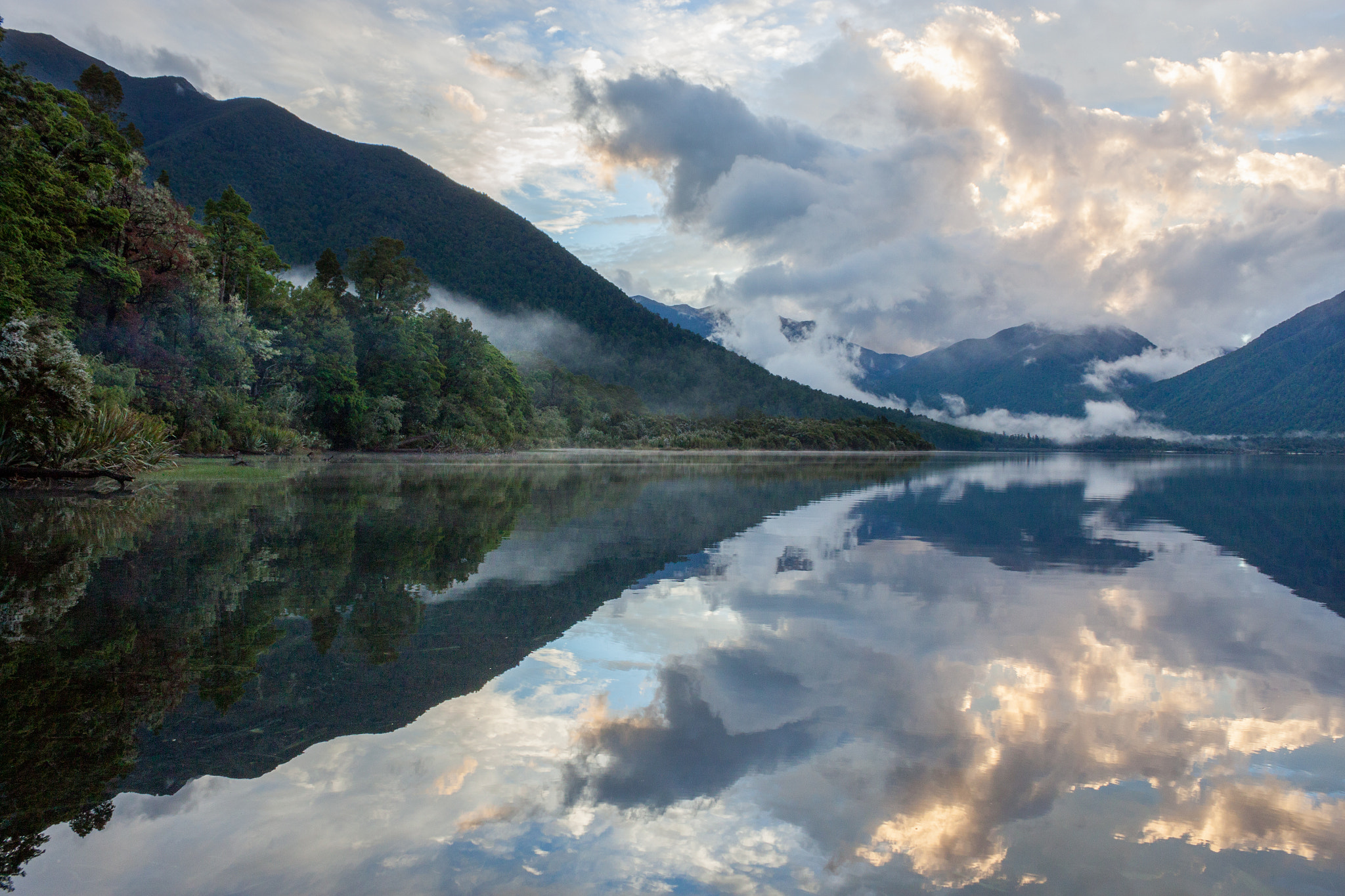
Lake Rotoroa, type locality of this species.

This species is endemic to New Zealand and has been collected in the Nelson lakes area.

== Habitat ==
T. angularis has been observed in mixed native forest.

== Behaviour ==
Adults of this species are on the wing in January.
