= Joanne Baxter =

New Zealand public health researcher

- Born: Joanne Mary Baxter
- Scientific career
- Institutions: University of Otago

Joanne Mary Baxter is a New Zealand Māori public health medicine physician and academic and affiliates with the iwi of Ngāi Tahu, Kāti Māmoe, Waitaha and Ngāti Apa ki te Rā Tō. She is a professor and director of Kōhatu, Centre for Hauora Māori, and co-director of the Māori Health Workforce Development Unit at the University of Otago. Baxter took up the position of dean of the Dunedin School of Medicine on 1 July 2022, and is the first Māori woman in the role.

== Academic career ==
Baxter was educated at Queen Charlotte College in Picton, where she was head girl in her final year. She was one of ten recipients of a Ngarimu Scholarship for undergraduates in 1982. She has MB ChB degrees from the University of Auckland and a Master of Public Health degree from the University of Otago, where she has been employed since 2000. Baxter is a member of the New Zealand College of Public Health Medicine (NZCPHM). Her research focusses on Māori health and mental health, health inequalities, Māori health workforce and medical education. She was promoted to full professor effective from 1 February 2020.

== Honours and awards ==
In 2016, Baxter was a key team member of the Dunedin Study led by Richie Poulton, that won that year's Prime Minister's Science Prize. Baxter was a finalist for Te Ururangi Award for Education in the 2017 Matariki Awards, alongside Dame Georgina Kingi, who won the award, and Robert Jahnke. Baxter has twice been honoured by Te Ohu Rata o Aotearoa / The Māori Medical Practitioners Association, winning the Maarire Goodall Award in 2013, and the Ngākau Award in 2019. In 2022, she won the Diversity, Equity and Inclusion Award at the Osmosis Raise the Line Faculty Awards.

== Selected works ==
- Jack Dummer; Emma Tumilty; Debbie Hannah; Kathryn McAuley; Jo Baxter; Fiona Doolan-Noble; Simon Donlevy; Tim Stokes (10 February 2020). "Health Care Utilisation and Health Needs of People with Severe COPD in the Southern Region of New Zealand: A Retrospective Case Note Review". COPD: Journal of Chronic Obstructive Pulmonary Disease. 17 (2): 1-7, 136-142. doi:10.1080/15412555.2020.1724275. ISSN 1541-2555. PMID 32037897. Wikidata Q89618611.
- Emma Tumilty; Fiona Doolan-Noble; Anna Tiatia Fa'atoese Latu; et al. (1 June 2020). "'A balancing act'. Living with severe chronic obstructive pulmonary disease in Southern New Zealand: a qualitative study". Journal of Primary Health Care. 12 (2): 166-172, 166. doi:10.1071/HC20007. ISSN 1172-6156. PMID 32594984. Wikidata Q96774030.
- Sara R Jaffee; Judith L Sligo; Helena M McAnally; Aroha E Bolton; Joanne M Baxter; Robert J Hancox (21 November 2020). "Early-onset and recurrent depression in parents increases risk of intergenerational transmission to adolescent offspring". Journal of Child Psychology and Psychiatry (in English and English). 62 (8): 979–988. doi:10.1111/JCPP.13356. ISSN 1469-7610. PMID 33222168. Wikidata Q102321025.
