= Mount Franklin (Tasman) =

Mountain in Tasman District New Zealand

Highest point
- Elevation: 2,340 m (7,680 ft)
- Coordinates: 42°3′5″S 172°41′15″E

Geography
- Location: Tasman District, New Zealand

Mount Franklin is a peak in the Nelson Lakes National Park in the Tasman Region of New Zealand. It is the northernmost – and highest – of New Zealand's four Mounts Franklin, located 15 kilometres (9.3 mi) south of Lake Rotoroa. It is the highest peak in the Tasman Region, just two metres higher than the nearby Mount Travers.

Mount Franklin is part of the Franklin Ridge, the northern extremity of the St James Range. The ridge separates the valleys of the east and west branches of the Sabine River.

The mountain was named by Sir Julius von Haast while he was provincial geologist of Canterbury. It is named in honour of Rear-Admiral Sir John Franklin, the British Arctic Explorer and former Governor of Tasmania.

== Notes ==
Some sources give the elevation as 2,327 metres (7,635 ft)
