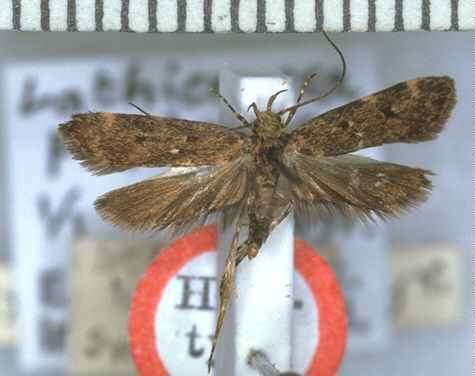
- Male holotype

Conservation status
- Data Deficit (NZ TCS)

Scientific classification
- Kingdom: Animalia
- Phylum: Arthropoda
- Clade: Pancrustacea
- Class: Insecta
- Order: Lepidoptera
- Family: Oecophoridae
- Genus: Lathicrossa
- Species: L. prophetica

Binomial name
- Lathicrossa prophetica Meyrick, 1927

= Lathicrossa prophetica =

Species of insect

Lathicrossa prophetica is a species of moth of the family Oecophoridae. It is endemic to New Zealand and has been found in both the North and South Islands. This species inhabits sub-alpine native forest and adults are on the wing in January. In 2025 this species was classified as "data deficient" under the New Zealand Threat Classification System.

== Taxonomy ==
This species was described by Edward Meyrick in 1927 using a specimen collected by Selwyn Woodward at Mount Arthur in the Nelson district in January. George Hudson discussed and illustrated this species in his 1928 publication The Butterflies and Moths of New Zealand. The male holotype specimen is held at the Natural History Museum, London.

== Description ==
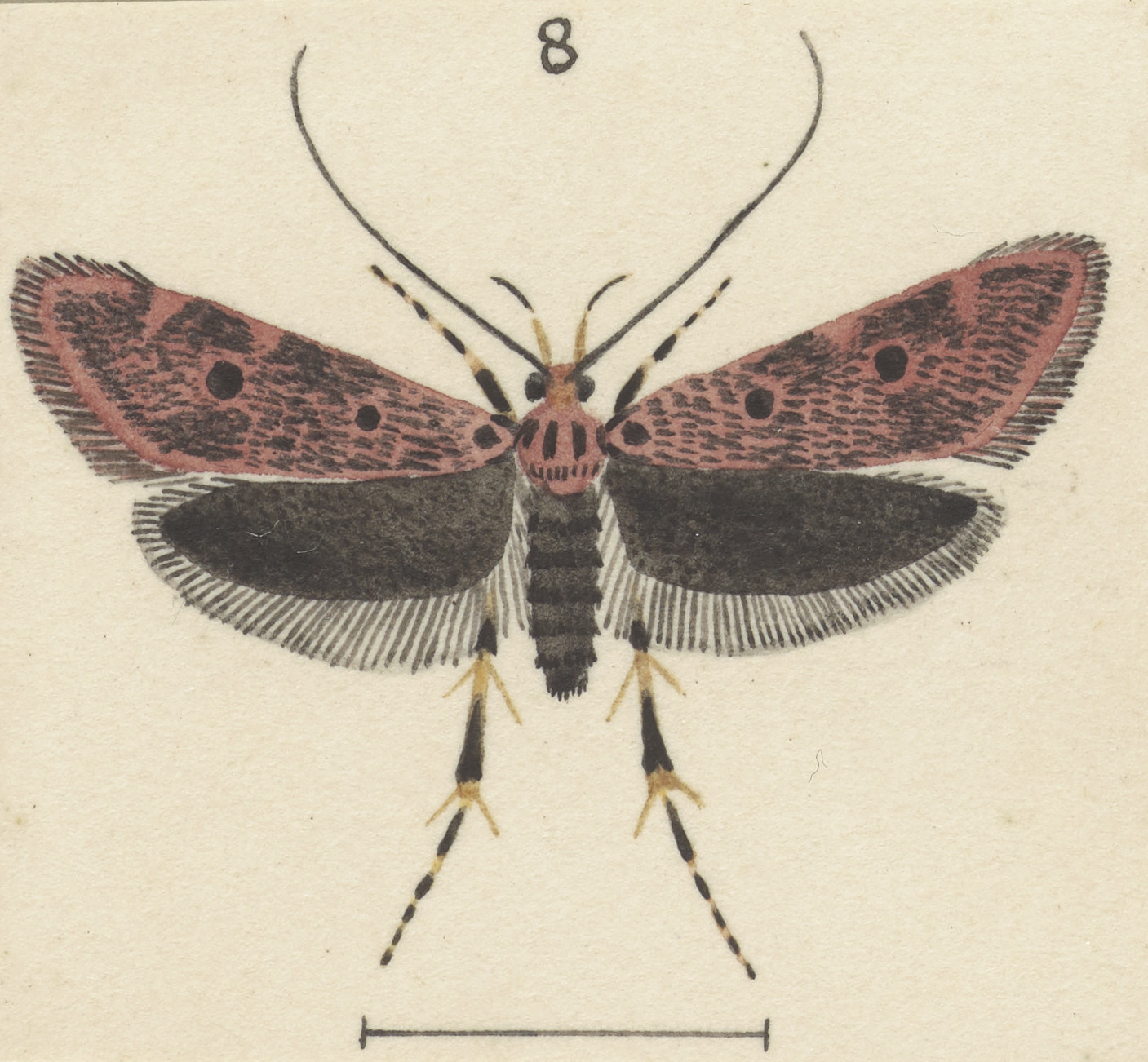
Illustration by Hudson.

Meyrick described the species as follows:

♀ 16 mm. Head whitish with a few blackish scales. Palpi whitish sprinkled blackish, terminal joint with broad blackish band. Thorax pale pink mixed dark grey. Forewings somewhat dilated, apex obtuse-pointed, termen faintly sinuate, oblique; light rose-pink suffusedly mixed dark grey; a small black spot on base of costa, and one just beyond and beneath it; stigmata forming small black spots, plical obliquely beyond first discal and rather smaller, each of these followed by a white dot, second discal subquadrate; the pink groundcolour forms small distinct spots on costa at middle and ¾ between patches of dark suffusion: cilia grey mixed pinky-whitish, base rose-pink. Hindwings grey finely irrorated blackish-grey; cilia grey, basal third blackish-grey.

== Distribution ==
This species is endemic to New Zealand. Other than the type locality, it has been collected at Karori in Wellington, Lake Rotoroa and at Karamea Bluffs on the West Coast.

== Biology and behaviour ==
The adults of this species is on the wing in January.

== Habitat ==
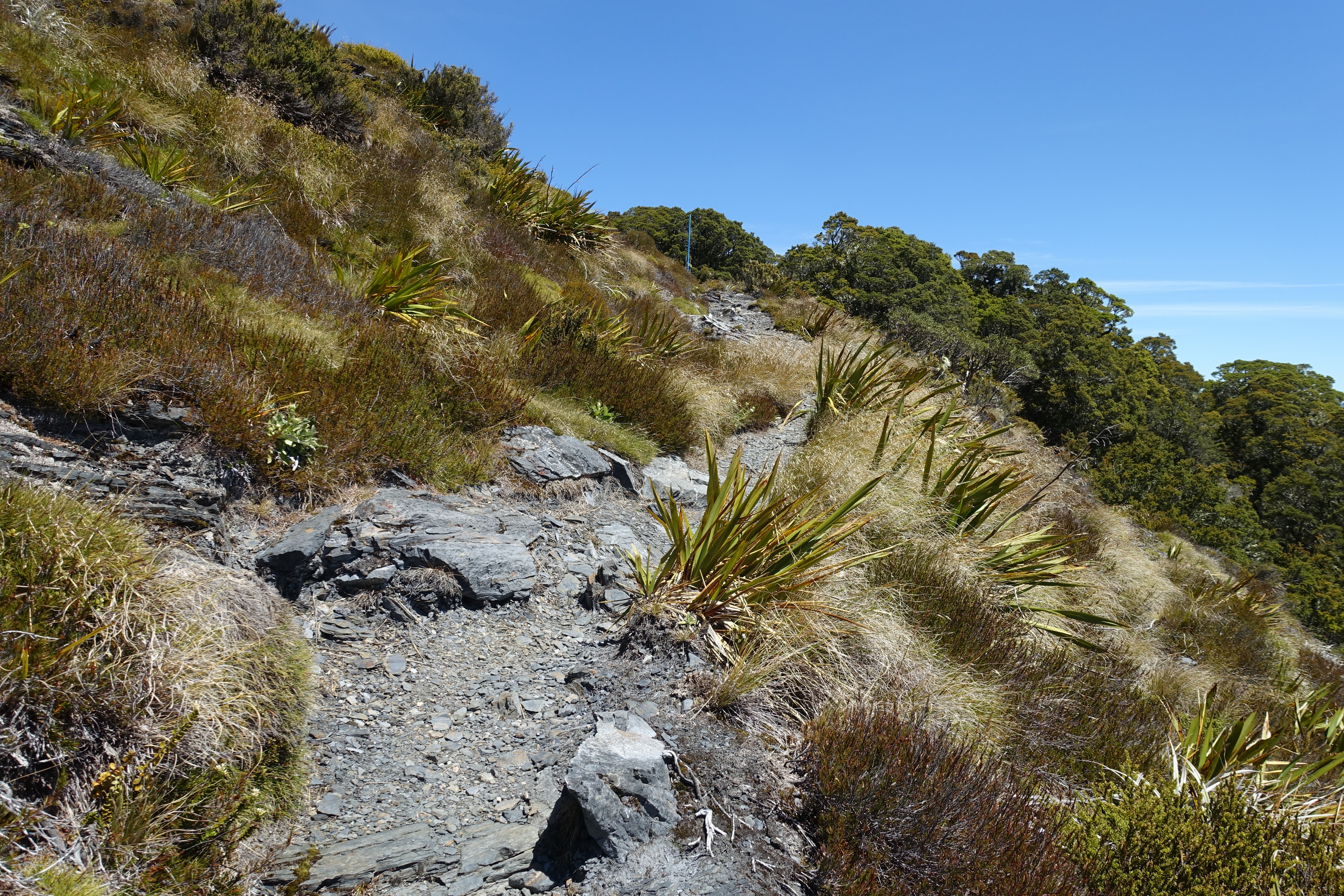
Mount Arthur, type locality of L. prophetica.

The holotype specimen was collected at approximately 1050m above sea-level. This species frequents sub-alpine forest.

== Conservation status ==
In 2025 this species was classified by the New Zealand Department of Conservation as "data deficient" under the New Zealand Threat Classification System. L. prophetica is regarded as being biologically sparse.
