= Sabine River =

Sabine River may refer to:

- Sabine River (Texas–Louisiana), United States
- Sabine River (New Zealand)
