= Lake Constance (New Zealand) =

Alpine lake in the South Island of New Zealand

- Māori: Rotopōhueroa
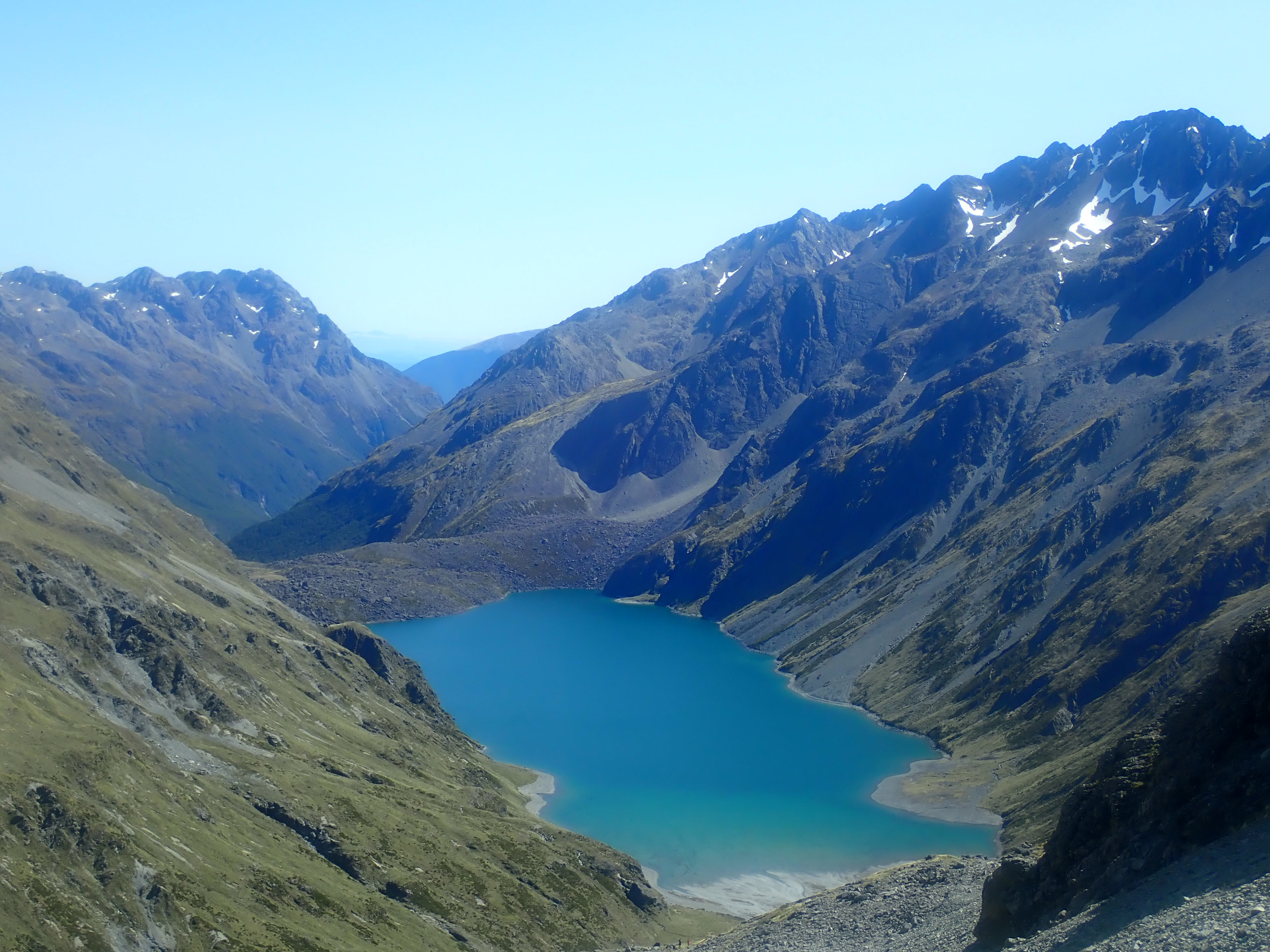

- Location in New Zealand
- Interactive map of Lake Constance
- Location: Tasman Region, South Island
- Coordinates: 42°05′S 172°40′E
- Primary outflows: underground river
- Basin countries: New Zealand

Rotopōhueroa / Lake Constance is an alpine lake in the South Island of New Zealand.

It lies within the borders of the Nelson Lakes National Park. The lake is drained via an underground river into the nearby Blue Lake.

In August 2014, the official name for Lake Constance was altered to Rotopōhueroa / Lake Constance, following the Treaty of Waitangi settlement between the Crown and Ngāti Apa ki te Rā Tō.
