= D'Urville River =

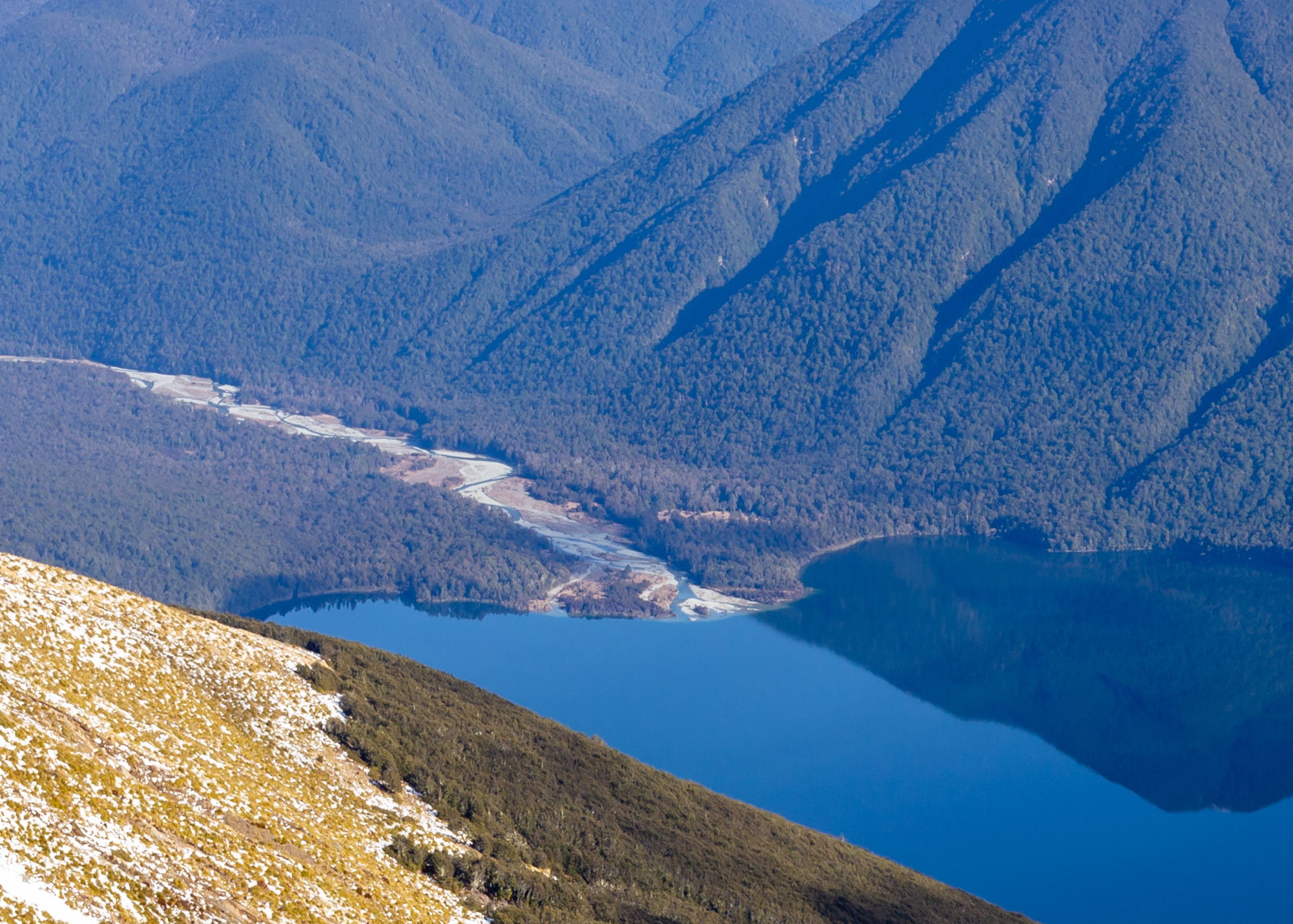
- Mouth of the D'Urville River as it enters Lake Rotoroa
- Route of the D'Urville River
- Mouth of the D'Urville River D'Urville River (New Zealand)
- Etymology: Named after Jules Dumont d'Urville

Location
- Country: New Zealand
- District: Tasman

Physical characteristics
- Source: Spenser Mountains
  - coordinates: 42.1406°S 172.6226°E
  - elevation: 1,480 m (4,860 ft)
- Mouth: Lake Rotoroa
  - coordinates: 41°54′31″S 172°39′12″E
  - elevation: 420 m (1,380 ft)
- Length: 26 km (16 mi)

Basin features
- Progression: D'Urville River → Lake Rotoroa → Te Kauparenui / Gowan River → Buller River → Tasman Sea
- River system: Buller River
- Tributaries
  - left: Bull Creek

The D'Urville River is in the South Island of New Zealand.

It lies within the Nelson Lakes National Park and flows north for 26 kilometres (16 mi) between the Ella and Mahanga ranges into Lake Rotoroa. It is one of the smaller rivers in the Buller River system. The river was named after the French navigator Jules Dumont d'Urville by Julius von Haast.

Brown and rainbow trout can be fished in the D'Urville River.

A tramping track runs along the river.
