= Sabine River (New Zealand) =

River in New Zealand

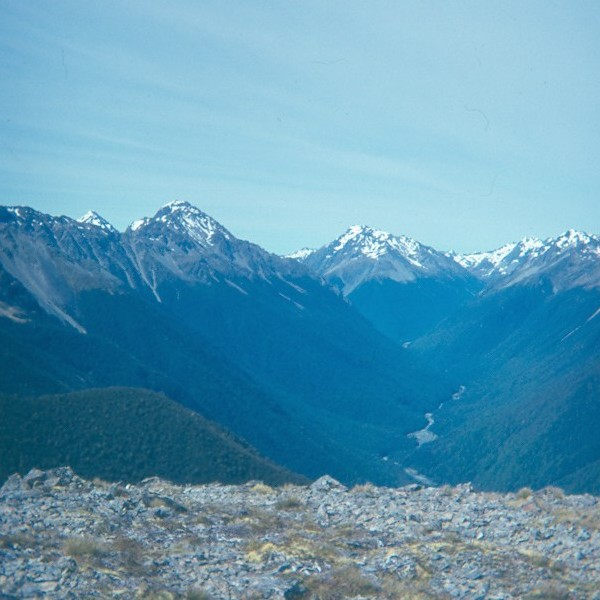
- View up the Sabine Valley
- Route of the Sabine River
- Mouth of the Sabine River Sabine River (New Zealand) (New Zealand)

Location
- Country: New Zealand
- District: Tasman

Physical characteristics
- Source: Sabine River West Branch
  - coordinates: 42.0700°S 172.6430°E
- 2nd source: Sabine River East Branch
  - coordinates: 42.0888°S 172.7220°E
- Mouth: Lake Rotoroa
  - coordinates: 41°54′20″S 172°40′29″E

Basin features
- Progression: Sabine River → Lake Rotoroa → Te Kauparenui / Gowan River → Buller River → Tasman Sea
- River system: Buller River
- Tributaries
  - left: Cattle Stream
  - right: Open Stream

The Sabine River is in the South Island of New Zealand. It is located in Nelson Lakes National Park.

There are two branches to the river—East Sabine and West Sabine. The West Sabine drains Lake Constance and the Blue Lake. The two branches join at the Sabine Forks, and flow into Lake Rotoroa. Apart from the upper reaches, which is open tussock and scrub, the river is set within unmodified beech forest. It is not a navigable river due to the rocky cascades along most of its length.

A tramping track runs along the river and forms the western branch of the Travers-Sabine tramping circuit. This route usually starts from Saint Arnaud at the northern end of Lake Rotoiti. It follows the course of the Travers River, goes up over the sub alpine Travers Saddle (1787 metres), and then descends along the East Sabine Valley and Sabine Valley to Lake Rotoroa. A track also ascends the West Sabine to Blue Lake. This route continues over the Waiau Pass, eventually connecting with the St James Walkway and Lewis Pass.

Three tramping huts are located in the Sabine Valley: Sabine Hut (on the shore of Lake Rotoroa, near the mouth of the Sabine); West Sabine Hut (near the Sabine Forks); and Blue Lake Hut.

== Ecology ==
There is a diversity of flora and birdlife within the Sabine River Valley.
