= Travers River =

River in New Zealand

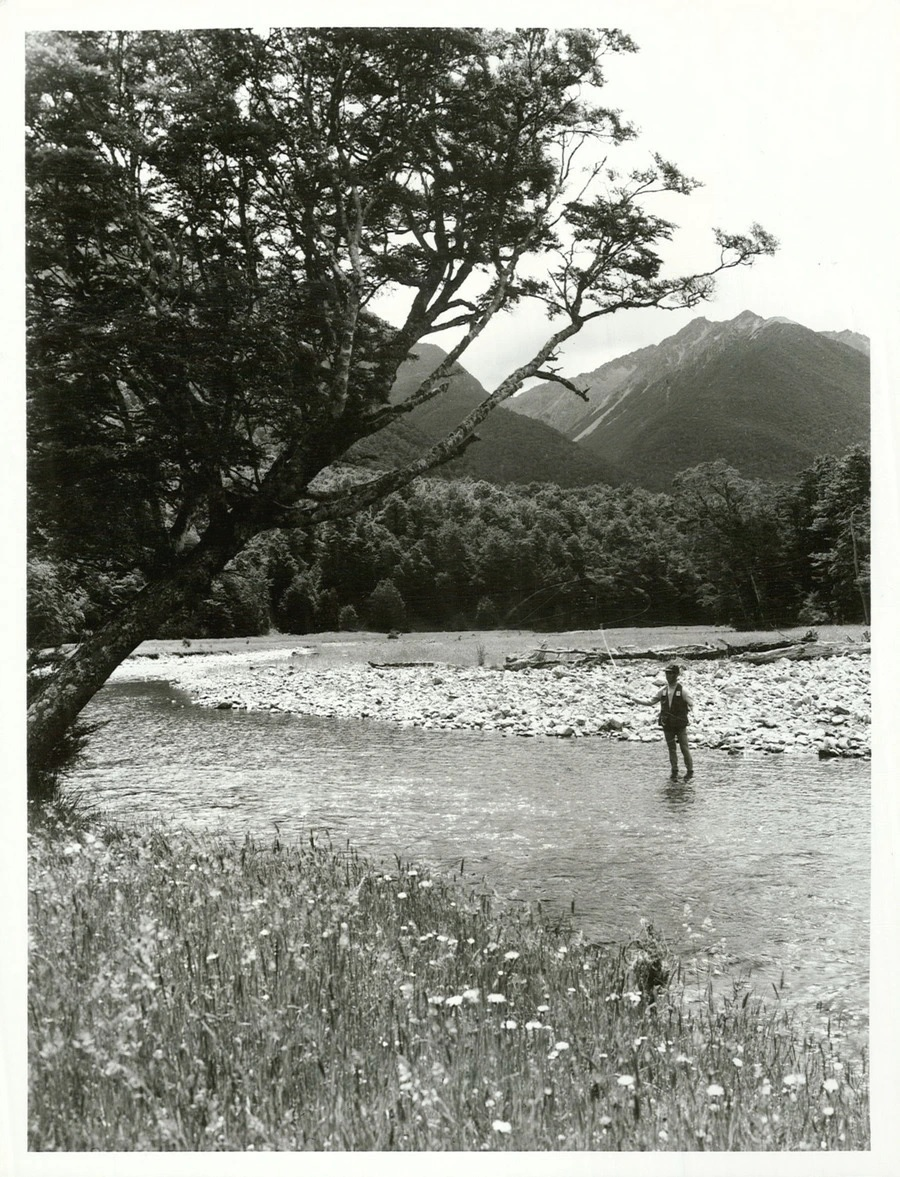
- Trout fishing in the Travers River, October 1979
- Route of the Travers River
- Mouth of the Travers River Travers River (New Zealand)

Location
- Country: New Zealand
- District: Tasman

Physical characteristics
- Source: Poukirikiri / Travers Saddle
  - coordinates: 42.03129°S 172.73314°E
- Mouth: Lake Rotoiti
  - coordinates: 41°52′16″S 172°49′06″E

Basin features
- Progression: Travers River → Lake Rotoiti → Buller River → Tasman Sea
- River system: Buller River
- Tributaries
  - left: Summit Creek, Cupola Creek, Hopeless Creek, Hukere Stream, Shift Creek, Coldwater Stream, Chandler Stream
  - right: Arnst River, Clearwater Stream
- Waterfalls: Travers Falls

The Travers River is in the South Island of New Zealand.

It lies within the borders of the Nelson Lakes National Park. The valley through which the river flows is popular with trampers and is part of the Travers-Sabine tramping circuit, which follows a major portion of the river, starting from Kerr Bay at Saint Arnaud and, after crossing the Travers Saddle (1787 metres), descends the valley of the Sabine River.

The river feeds into Lake Rotoiti. It is not a navigable waterway due to its small size and numerous rocky cascades. The lower reaches of the river lie in open tussock which was burnt and grazed by early European settlers. Further upstream the river flows through unmodified beech forest. The upper reaches are in subalpine scrub above the bushline.

The New Zealand Department of Conservation maintains a number of mountain huts and shelters along the length of the Travers Valley and within the surrounding mountains. These include the Lake Head Hut, Coldwater Hut, the Angelus Hut, the Hopeless Hut, the Cupola Basin Hut, John Tait Hut, and the Upper Travers Hut. Details of these can be obtained from the DOC Visitors Centre in Saint Arnaud.

The river, as well as the nearby Mount Travers, the Travers Range, and the Travers-Sabine Circuit in Nelson Lakes National Park are named after the 19th-century New Zealand politician and naturalist William Travers.
