= Rotoroa, New Zealand =

Rotoroa
- Interactive map of Rotoroa
- Coordinates: 41.7955°S 172.593°E
- Country: New Zealand
- Territorial authority: Tasman
- Ward: Lakes-Murchison
- Electorates: West Coast-Tasman; Te Tai Tonga (Māori)

Government
  - Territorial Authority: Tasman District Council
  - Mayor of Tasman: Tim King
  - West Coast-Tasman MP: Maureen Pugh
  - Te Tai Tonga MP: Tākuta Ferris

Area
  - Total: 167.78 km^{2} (64.78 sq mi)

Population (2023 census)
  - Total: 69
  - Density: 0.41/km^{2} (1.1/sq mi)
- Time zone: UTC+12 (NZST)
  - Summer (DST): UTC+13 (NZDT)

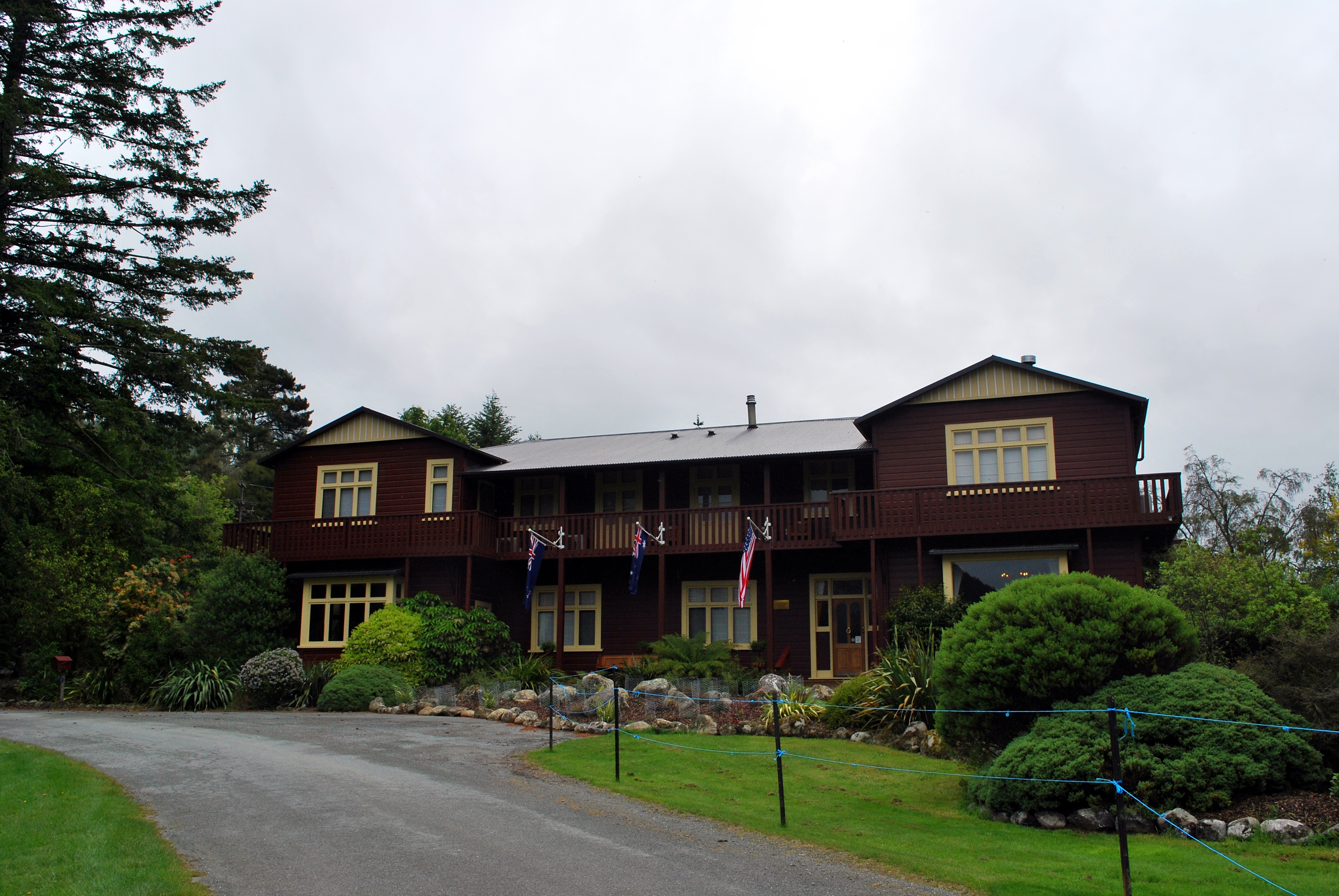
Lake Rotoroa Lodge at Lake Rotoroa, New Zealand

Rotoroa is a small settlement at the north western end of Lake Rotoroa in the South Island of New Zealand. Rotoroa is located in the Tasman Region.

== Demographics ==
Rororoa locality covers 167.78 km^{2} (64.78 sq mi). It is part of the larger Murchison-Nelson Lakes statistical area.

Historical population
Year	Pop.	±% p.a.
2006	54	—
2013	51	−0.81%
2018	54	+1.15%
2023	69	+5.02%

Rotoroa had a population of 69 in the 2023 New Zealand census, an increase of 15 people (27.8%) since the 2018 census, and an increase of 18 people (35.3%) since the 2013 census. There were 39 males and 33 females in 33 dwellings. The median age was 51.9 years (compared with 38.1 years nationally). There were 15 people (21.7%) aged under 15 years, 3 (4.3%) aged 15 to 29, 33 (47.8%) aged 30 to 64, and 18 (26.1%) aged 65 or older.

People could identify as more than one ethnicity. The results were 95.7% European (Pākehā), 4.3% Māori, and 13.0% Pasifika. English was spoken by 95.7%, Samoan by 4.3%, and other languages by 8.7%. No language could be spoken by 4.3% (e.g. too young to talk). The percentage of people born overseas was 13.0, compared with 28.8% nationally.

Religious affiliations were 39.1% Christian, and 4.3% other religions. People who answered that they had no religion were 43.5%, and 13.0% of people did not answer the census question.

Of those at least 15 years old, 6 (11.1%) people had a bachelor's or higher degree, 36 (66.7%) had a post-high school certificate or diploma, and 12 (22.2%) people exclusively held high school qualifications. The median income was $22,100, compared with $41,500 nationally. 3 people (5.6%) earned over $100,000 compared to 12.1% nationally. The employment status of those at least 15 was 24 (44.4%) full-time and 9 (16.7%) part-time.
