= Travers-Sabine Circuit =

Tramping route in New Zealand

Coordinates: 41.808°S 172.852°E

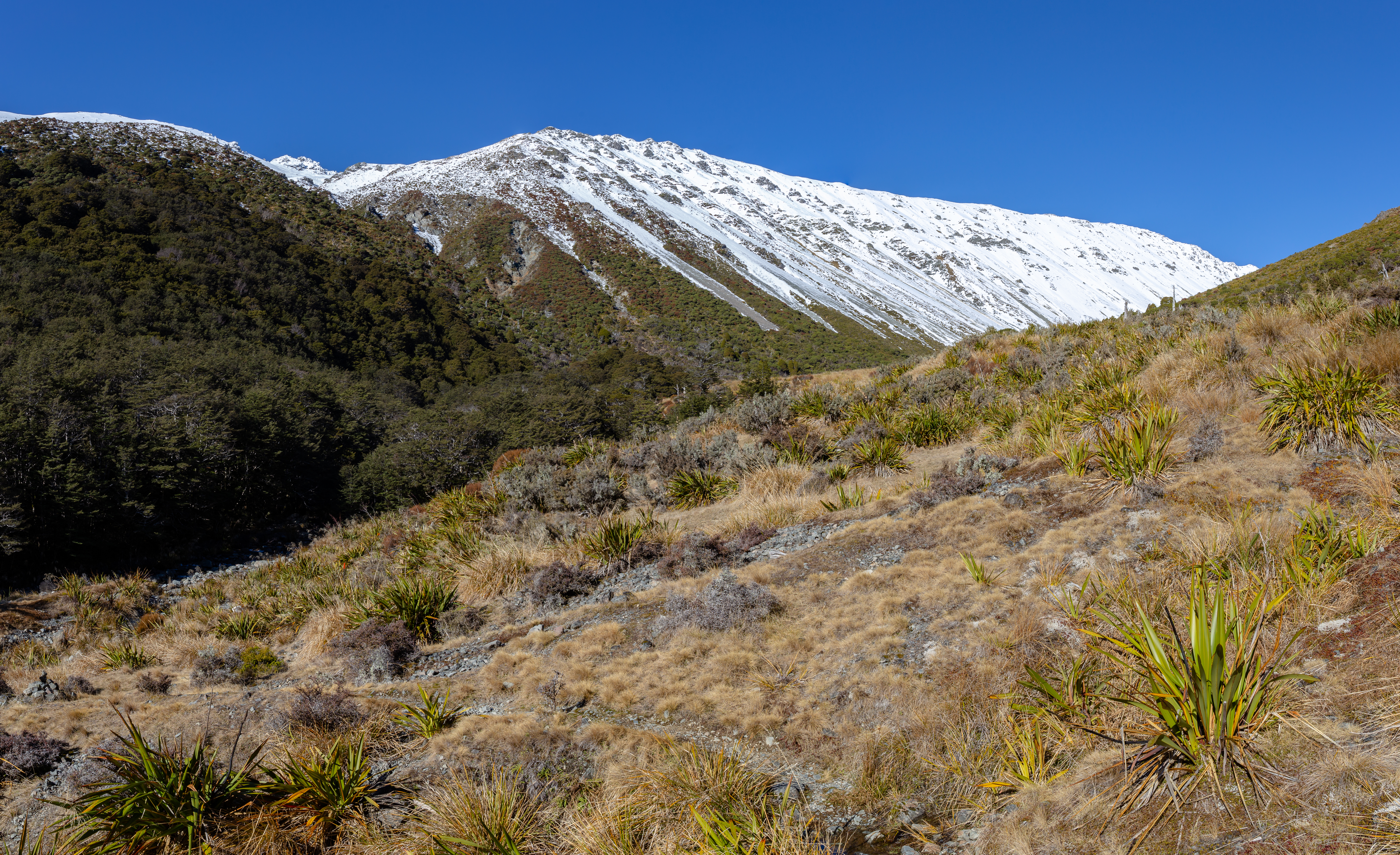
- Speargrass Creek Route to Angelus Hut, Nelson Lakes National Park
- Length: 80 km (50 mi)
- Location: Nelson Lakes National Park, New Zealand
- Designation: New Zealand Great Walk
- Trailheads: Saint Arnaud
- Use: Tramping
- Website: www.doc.govt.nz/parks-and-recreation/places-to-go/nelson-tasman/places/nelson-lakes-national-park/things-to-do/tracks/travers-sabine-circuit/

The Travers-Sabine Circuit is a popular tramping route in Nelson Lakes National Park, New Zealand. The full circuit takes about five to six days, although many side-trips are possible for longer tramps.

The circuit involves both bush-walking and alpine passes. In bush areas, the tracks are well marked. Routes in alpine areas are marked with poles.

In Summer and Autumn (December to April) the circuit is accessible to anyone reasonably fit. During Winter and Spring (May to November), snowfall, especially in Alpine areas, make the route more technical, and appropriate skills, equipment and experience are needed. Some parts of the track are subject to flooding during heavy rain.

No permits are required to walk the route, but trampers should register at the National Park headquarters. Basic huts are available for overnight accommodation at regular intervals on the route, on a first-come, first-served basis. Fees are required for the huts, but there's no fee for the walk itself.

== Typical itinerary ==
- Day 1: From St. Arnaud, walk alongside Lake Rotoiti to Lake Head hut (2–3 hours). Continue up the Travers valley to John Tait Hut (about 5 hours from Lake Head).
- Day 2: Continue up Travers Valley to Upper Travers Hut (3 hours)
- Day 3: Cross the Travers Saddle, descend the East Sabine valley to Sabine Forks and West Sabine Hut (6 hours). New Zealand Mountain Safety Council's video on Poukirikiri/Travers Saddle
- Day 4: Continue down the Sabine Valley to the head of Lake Rotoroa and Sabine Hut (5 hours).
- Day 5: From Sabine Hut climb Mt. Cedric to Lake Angelus (5–6 hours).
- Day 6: From Lake Angelus, proceed along the Robert Ridge to the Mt. Robert car park (6–7 hours). Hitch a ride or walk back to St. Arnaud (1–2 hours).

In this itinerary, days 2 and 4 are half-day walks, and days 3 and 5 are less than full day. Experienced trampers can easily complete the circuit in five days.

Also, an alternative to Days 5-6 is to return via Howard and Speargrass Valleys (quicker and easier in bad weather, but less interesting).

== Shorter circuits ==
- 2 Days: Lake Rotoiti, Travers Valley, Hukere Stream to Lake Angelus (Day 1). Exit via the Robert Ridge (day 2).
- 3 Days: Lake Rotoiti, Travers Valley, Hopeless Creek Hut (Day 1). Ascend through Sunset Saddle to Lake Angelus (Day 2). Exit via Robert Ridge (Day 3).

== Gallery ==
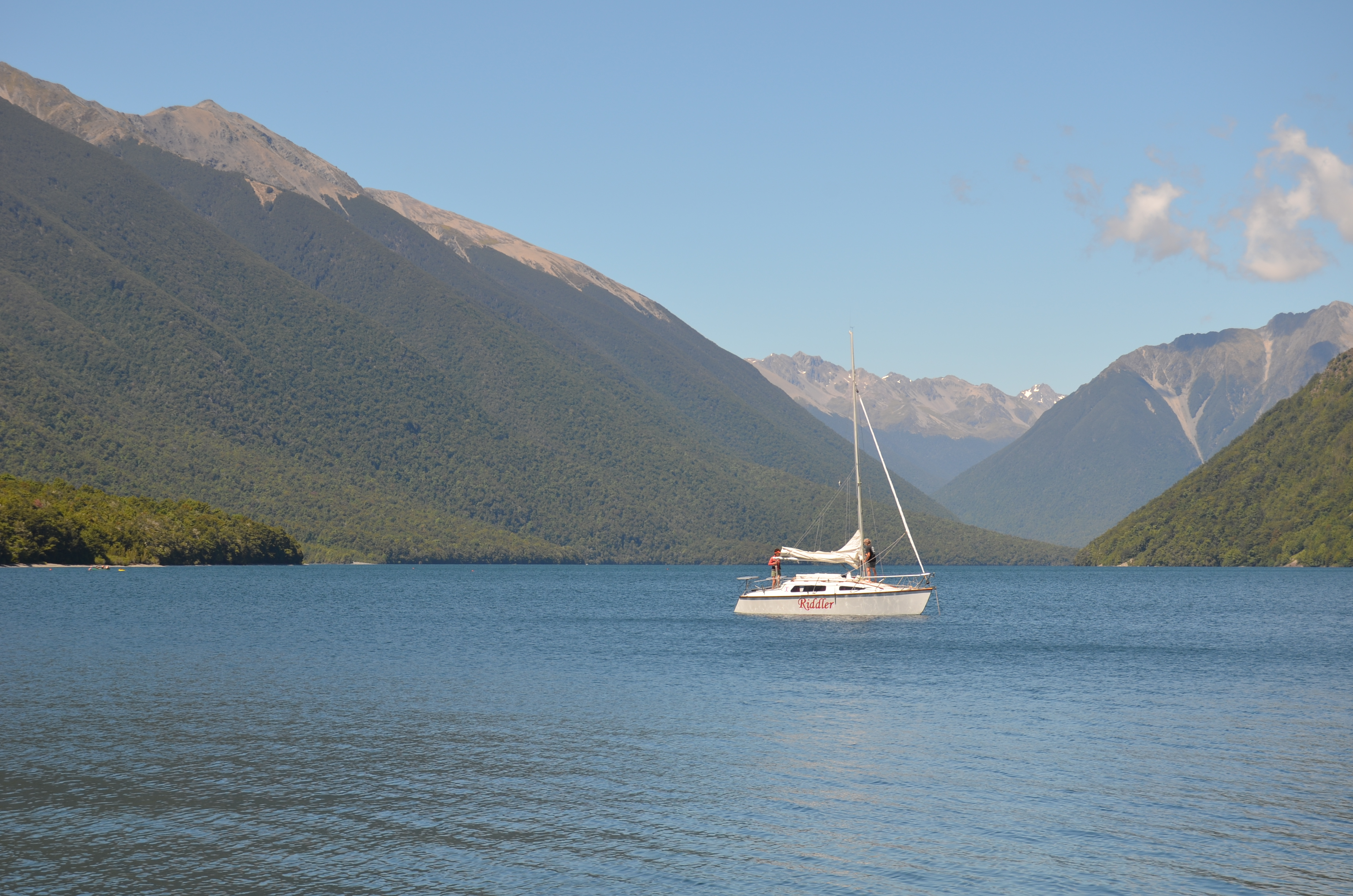
Lake Rotoiti from the start of the Travers-Sabine Circuit at Kerr Bay

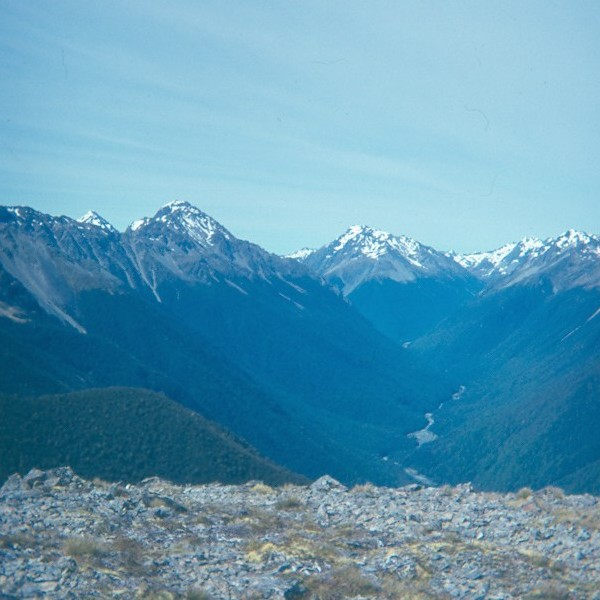
Sabine Valley

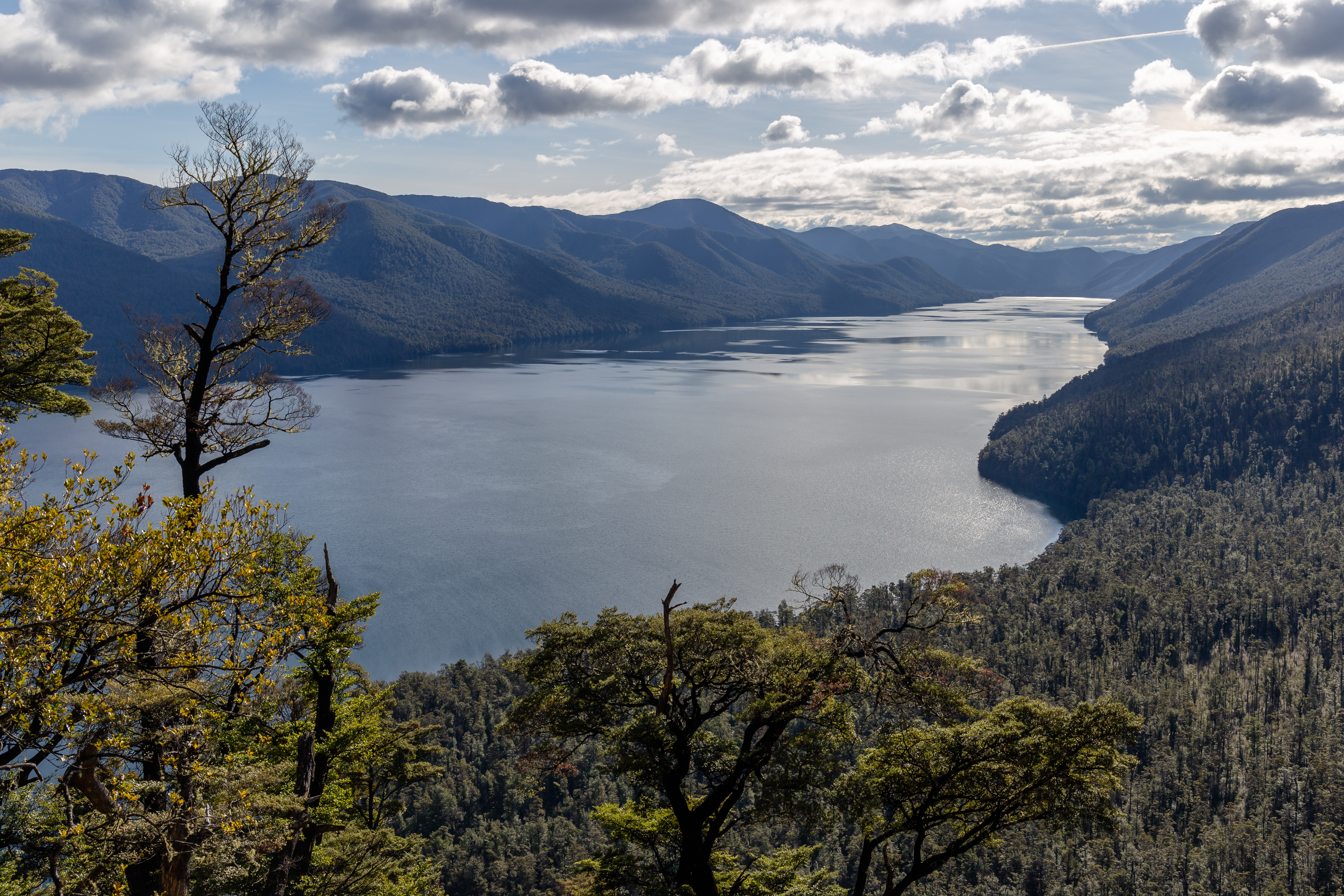
Lake Rotoroa seen from the Travers-Sabine Circuit

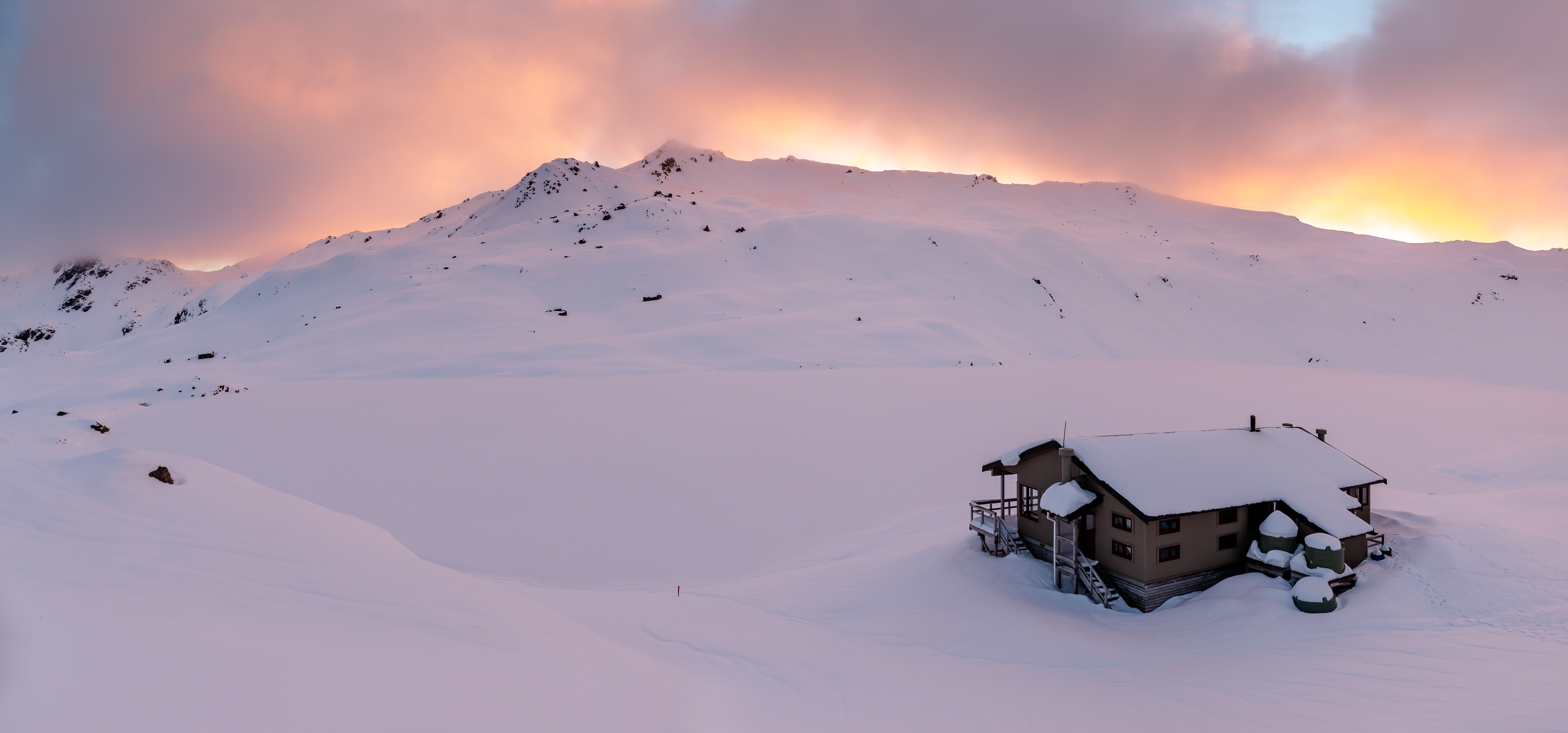
Angelus Hut with Lake Angelus in the winter

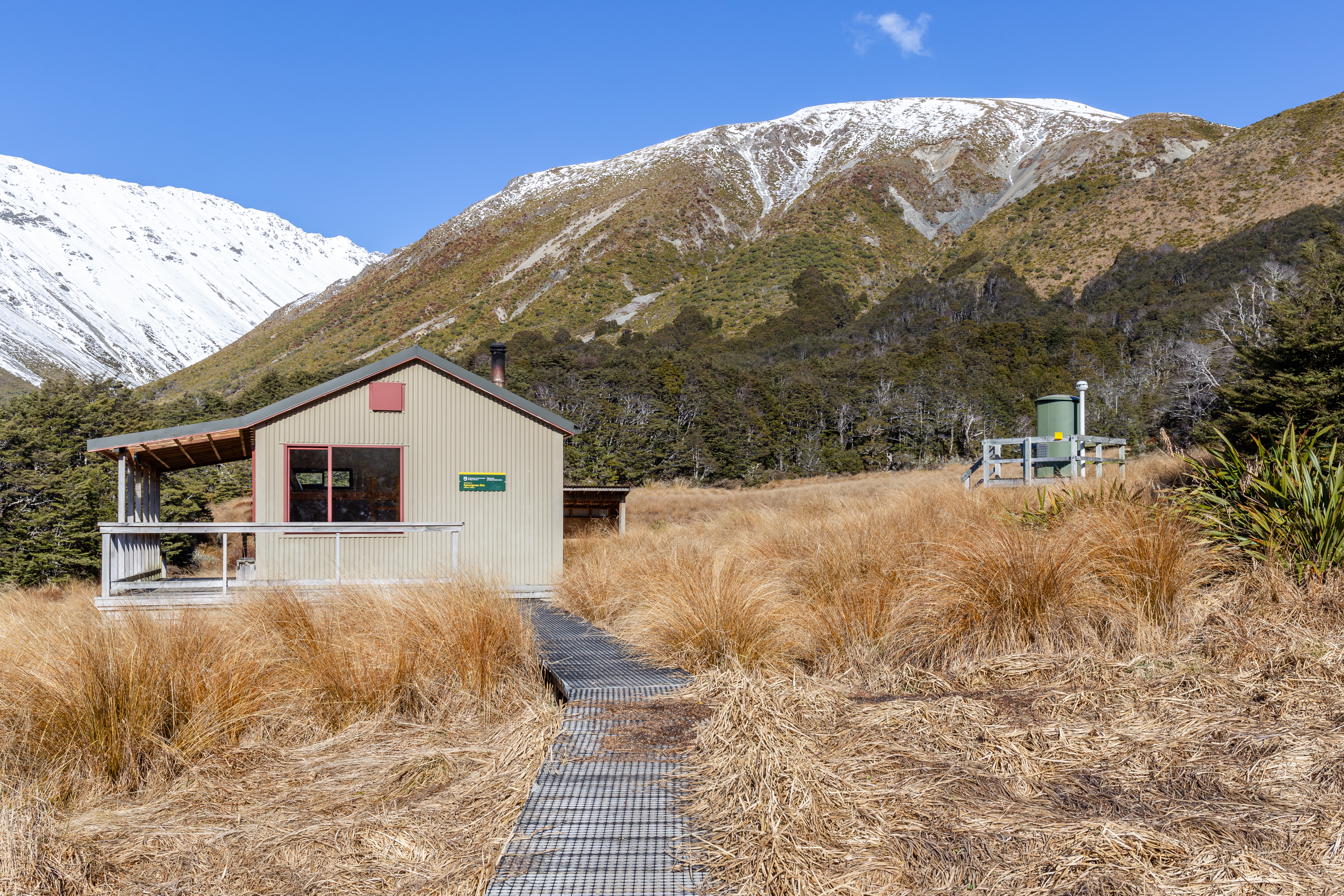
Speargrass Hut
