= Ngāti Apa ki te Rā Tō =

Māori tribe in New Zealand

- Iwi (tribe) in Māoridom
- Rohe (region): Upper South Island
- Waka (canoe): Kurahaupō
- Website: Official website

Ngāti Apa ki te Rā Tō is a Māori iwi (tribe) in the upper South Island of New Zealand. Its rohe (tribal lands) include the areas around Golden Bay, Tākaka, Tasman Bay / Te Tai-o-Aorere, Motueka, Nelson and Saint Arnaud, including the Buller River (Kawatiri) catchment and Lakes Rotoiti, Rotoroa, and the Tophouse.

== Hapū and marae ==
Ngāti Apa ki te Rā Tō has two hapū with affiliated marae:

- Pūaha Te Rangi (Te Taha o Te Awa marae and Te Taha o te Awa wharenui, Westport)
- Tarakaipa (Ōmaka marae and Te Aroha o te Waipounamu wharenui, Blenheim)

== Governance ==
Ngāti Apa ki Te Rā Tō Charitable Trust is the mandated iwi organisation under the Māori Fisheries Act, the iwi aquaculture organisation under the Māori Commercial Aquaculture Claims Settlement Act, is a Tūhono organisation, and is an "iwi authority" under the Resource Management Act 1991. Ngāti Apa ki Te Rā Tō Trust is recognised by the New Zealand Government as the Ngāti Apa ki te Rā Tō governance entity, following its settlement with the Crown under the Ngāti Apa ki te Rā Tō, Ngāti Kuia, and Rangitāne o Wairau Claims Settlement Act 2014. It also represents Ngāti Apa ki te Rā Tō as an iwi authority under the Resource Management Act. The trust is a common law trust governed by six trustees. Both trusts are governed by six trustees: three from Pūaha Te Rangi hapū and three from Tarakaipa hapū.

As of April 2025, the trust chairperson is Nicole Akuhata, the general manager is Darren Ngaru King, and the trust has offices in Blenheim and Nelson.

The iwi has interests in the territories of Tasman District Council, Nelson City Council, Marlborough District Council, the West Coast Regional Council and Buller District Council.

== Notable people ==
- Joanne Baxter – public health academic
- Jackson Hemopo – rugby union player
- Tuiti Makitanara – politician
- Fayne Robinson – master carver
