= Sara Jaffee =

American psychologist

- Education: Oberlin College; University of Wisconsin–Madison
- Known for: Developmental psychopathology
- Scientific career
- Fields: Psychology
- Institutions: University of Pennsylvania
- Thesis: Developmental antecedents of early parenthood: Accounting for the difficulties faced by young mothers, young fathers, and their children (2001)
- Doctoral advisor: Avshalom Caspi

Sara Rachel Jaffee is an American developmental psychologist and professor of psychology at the University of Pennsylvania, where she is also Department Chair. Jaffee's parents were both teachers, which may have influenced her research in academic trajectory and optimism later in life. Professor Sara teaches in four courses. She is the director of the Risk and Resilience Lab and the University of Pennsylvania, an interdisciplinary lab which specializes in the effects of negative life experiences on mental health. She previously held a faculty position at the Institute of Psychiatry. She specializes in the field of developmental psychopathology, with a particular focus on antisocial behavior in children.
