= COPD: Journal of Chronic Obstructive Pulmonary Disease =

- Discipline: Pulmonology
- Language: English

Publication details
- History: 2004-present
- Publisher: Informa Healthcare (United States)
- Frequency: Quarterly
- Impact factor: 2.576 (2016)

Standard abbreviations
- ISO 4: COPD

Indexing
- ISSN: 1541-2555 (print); 1541-2563 (web)

Links
- Journal homepage

The COPD: Journal of Chronic Obstructive Pulmonary Disease is a peer-reviewed medical journal that covers all aspects of chronic obstructive pulmonary disease and its related conditions.

== Editor-in-Chief ==
The editor in chief of COPD: Journal of Chronic Obstructive Pulmonary Disease is Vito Brusasco.
