= Te Kauparenui / Gowan River =

River in New Zealand

Coordinates: 41°43′S 172°34′E

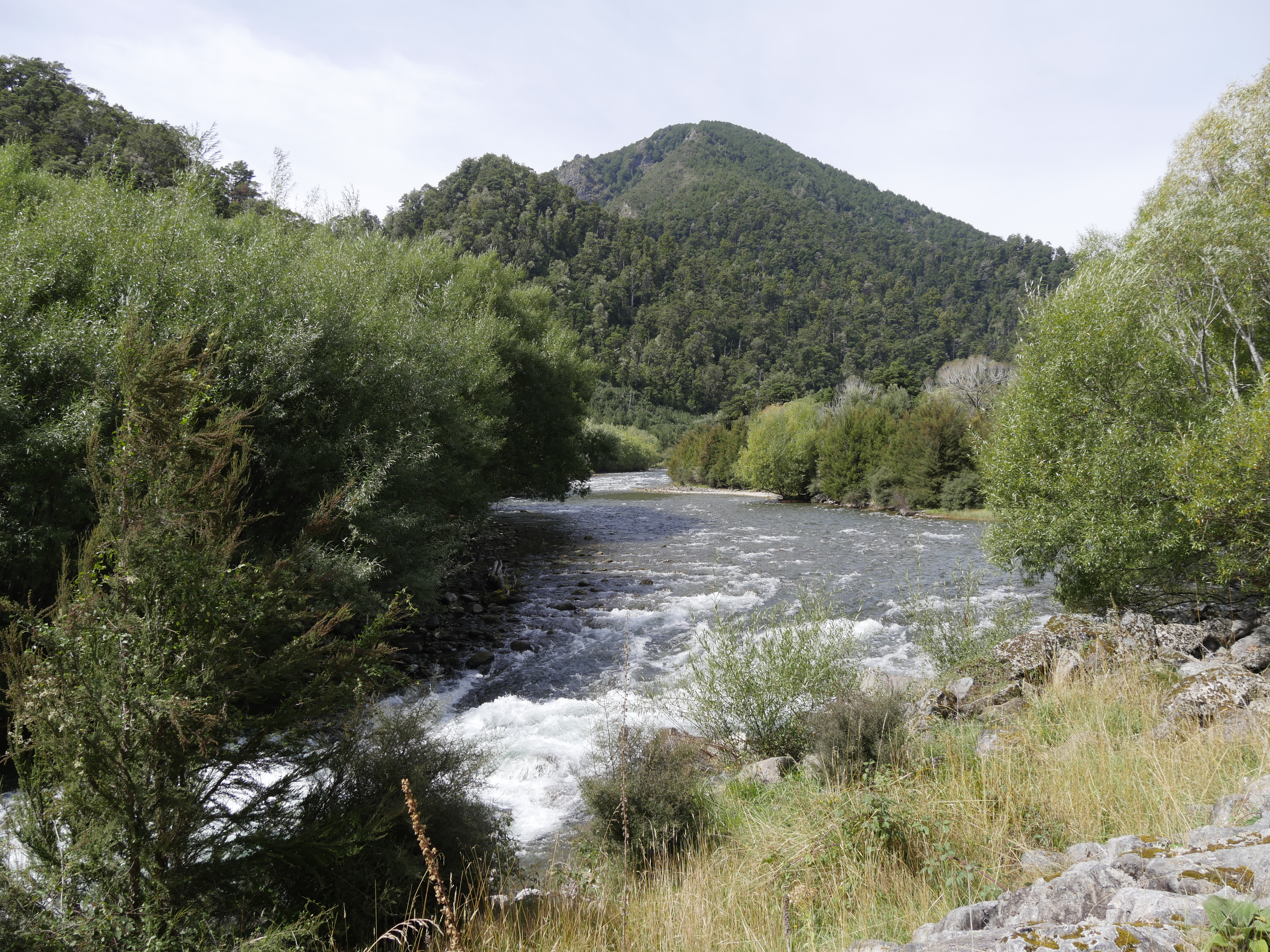

Location
- Country: New Zealand

Physical characteristics
- Source
  - location: Lake Rotoroa
- Mouth
  - location: Buller River
- Length: 11 km (6.8 mi)

Te Kauparenui / Gowan River is in the South Island of New Zealand. Its source is at Lake Rotoroa and travels 11 kilometres before feeding into the Buller River. Mixed farming and forestry occurs on both banks of the river. The river has introduced trout which attracts recreational fishing.

In 2001 a Water Conservation Order was placed on the river to recognise the value of it in an unmodified state. An application was made by Majac Trust to change the Order so that a hydroelectric electricity scheme could be constructed on the river. This was rejected by the Environment Court in August 2007.

In August 2014, the name of the river was officially altered to Te Kauparenui / Gowan River. In 1843, Charles Heaphy named the river after James Robert Gowen, one the New Zealand Company directors, but misspelled the name as Gowan in his 1846 journal, and the latter spelling has since prevailed.
