= Nelson Lakes National Park =

National park in New Zealand

- IUCN category II (national park)
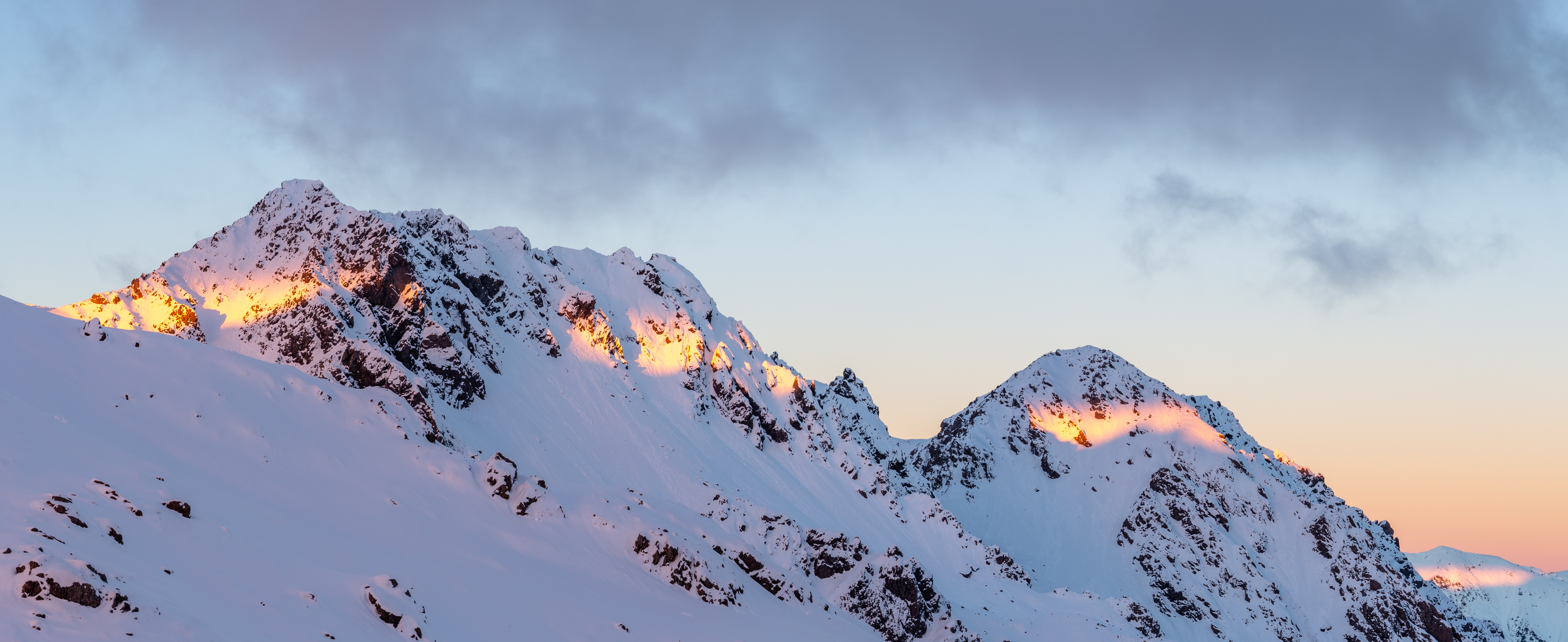
- Peaks between Hukere Stream and Shift Creek valley, Nelson Lakes National Park
- Interactive map of Nelson Lakes National Park
- Location: Tasman District
- Nearest city: Nelson
- Coordinates: 41°49′9″S 172°50′15″E
- Area: 1,018.8 km^{2} (393.4 sq mi)
- Established: 1956
- Governing body: Department of Conservation

Nelson Lakes National Park is in the South Island of New Zealand, at the northern end of the Southern Alps. It was created in 1956 (one of four created in the 1950s). The park contains beech forests, multiple lakes, snow-covered mountains and valleys created by glaciers during the ice ages.

== History ==
The lands and waters of Nelson Lakes National Park are of significance to many Māori nations partly because the waters of the lakes are important sources for the rivers running through various regions. These nations or iwi include: Ngāti Apa ki te Rā Tō, Ngāti Kuia, Rangitāne o Wairau, Ngāti Rārua, Ngāti Tama ki Te Tau Ihu, Ngāti Toa Rangatira and Te Atiawa o Te Waka-a-Māui and earlier, Ngāti Tūmatakōkiri.

The colonial New Zealand Company claimed to have purchased a large area of the South Island including the area of the Nelson Lakes National Park in 1839, this was disputed and discredited in 1844. The disputed claims were settled in 1856, although the agreements were not honoured on the most part by the Crown and not all the iwi with interests were included in the settlement. The first national park in New Zealand was established in 1887. Pressure from Māori groups to preserve land and support amongst Pākehā advanced the national park movement.

Nelson Lakes National Park was formed after the passing of the National Parks Act (1952) in 1956, also Fiordland (1952), Mount Cook (1953) and Urewera (1954) National Parks were created in the 1950s.

== Geography ==
Nelson Lakes National Park covers some 1,019 square kilometres (393 mi^{2}). The park is centered at two large lakes, Rotoiti and Rotoroa, and their surrounding valleys and catchment areas (including Travers, Sabine and D'Urville rivers). The upper reaches of the Mātakitaki and Glenroy river valleys were added to the park in 1988. The park management plan divides the park into four management areas: St Arnaud, Travers Valley, Rotoroa and Marakitaki-Glenroy.

The Alpine Fault cuts through the park in a northeast-to-southwest direction, passing through St. Arnaud township, the northern end of Lake Rotoiti and the southern end of Lake Rotoroa.

Mountain peaks in the park have elevations ranging from approximately 1,800 metres (5,900 ft) to 2,300 metres (7,500 ft). Two permanent snowfields are located on Mount Ella and Mount Hopeless, and are the northernmost of this feature on the South Island. Mountain ranges intersecting the park include:

- the Ella Range, featuring Mount Magadalene reaching 2,187 metres (7,175 ft) and Mount Ella 2,253 metres (7,392 ft)
- the Mahanga Range
- the Spenser Mountains
- the Travers Range, which includes Mount Travers at 2,338 metres (7,671 ft), Mount Hopeless at 2,278 metres (7,474 ft), Angelus Peak at 2,075 metres (6,808 ft) and Mount Robert at 1,411 metres (4,629 ft)
- the Saint Arnaud Range, including Mount Mackay at 2,300 metres (7,500 ft), the Camel,1,889 metres (6,198 ft), and Mount McRae at 1,878 metres (6,161 ft)
- the Franklin Ridge. Mount Franklin, at 2,340 metres (7,680 ft), is the highest point in the park.

To the west of the park lies the Victoria Forest Park, and to the south lies the Lewis Pass Scenic Reserve and the St James Conservation Area. Northeast of the park is the Mount Richmond Forest Park.

The park is a popular area for camping, tramping and fishing. The first park ranger was appointed in 1959. George Lyon, in this role, spent much of the 1960s building huts and making improvements to the tracks.

The park is administered by the Department of Conservation, which operates a visitor centre in Saint Arnaud that provides up-to-date and reliable information on all aspects of the National Park.

== Ecology ==
A wide variety of ecosystems exist within the park, in turn supporting many bird, amphibian and insect communities. Landscapes range from alpine scree to wetlands, tussocklands and upland mountain beech forests. Forests of mountain, red, and silver beech provide habitat for threatened kākā and kākāriki. However, birds and insects that relied on the honeydew production of the park's beech forests have been severely negatively impacted by invasive wasps.

=== Flora ===
Nelson Lakes National Park is notable for its diversity of alpine flora. The park has a few rare species of vegetation, with four currently listed as either threatened (consisting of three species of beech mistletoe) or endangered (Pittosporum patulum).

=== Fauna ===
==== Kererū ====
The first record of kererū or New Zealand wood pigeon in the national park is from Charles Heaphy in 1846 who "obtained" six of them in a day and a half. There is a population of kererū at Lake Rotoroa which is considered stable.

==== Kākāriki ====
The yellow-crowned parakeet were very common with "hundreds" near Lake Rotoroa around 1900. Although numbers have declined and they are considered rare, they can be spotted in many valleys of the national park. The red-crowned parakeet is considered possibly extinct within the park, while the orange-fronted parakeet (Kākāriki karaka) is considered extinct in the national park.

==== Kākāpō ====
Kākāpō were common in the national park in the 1800s. Mary Thornton described "the kokapaw (kakapo)" as "good eating … all feathers really … you need at least a couple each for a good feed" in the 1890s. She then commented that "the kakapo seemed to vanish about the beginning of World War I".

==== Western weka ====
The western weka (Gallirallus australis australis) is considered rare in the Nelson Lakes area. They were common when Charles Heaphy visited Lake Rotoroa in 1846. Julius von Haast wrote in 1861 that "no other bird being as numerous as the weka which was everywhere in the grassy plains, forests, as well as near the summits of mountains amongst sub alpine vegetation". Weka were common throughout the Nelson Lakes before a sudden decline in their numbers between March and April 1909.

==== South Island robin ====
The South Island robin (Petroica australis australis) can commonly be seen in Nelson Lakes National Park. They are a small bird that lives on a diet of insects, with grey colouring and a white patch on their lower chest area. They are a very inquisitive species and often approach visitors to the national park getting within metres of them. Younger birds have been known to stand on a person's boot. They live in the forest and are often seen foraging on the ground. Their nests are at risk of predation from introduced mammalian species.

==== South Island kākā ====
Large populations of kākā existed in the national park in the 1800s with "hundreds" living around Lake Rotoroa by about 1900. The populations declined throughout the 20th century to the point that it was rare to see groups of more than five or six birds by 1991.

South Island kākā (Nestor meridionalis meridionalis) were rarely seen in the park in 2009. They were most abundant around Lakes Rotoiti and Rotoroa and have benefited from the extensive stoat trapping carried out by the Rotoiti Nature Recovery Project. Kākā are at risk from predation by stoats and possums.

==== Blue duck ====
The blue duck or whio (Hymenolaimus malacorhynchos) was common in the Nelson Lakes region in the 1800s with Julius von Haast noting in 1862 that "It is found in all rivers, and is easily killed". During the Nelson Lakes National Park survey of 1978–1985 blue duck were only recorded in the Travers, Sabine, Glenroy and Matakitaki valleys, with the Matakitaki valley being home to the greatest numbers. By 2009, there were too few birds, especially females remaining in Nelson Lakes National Park, to ensure the continuation of the species without human help.

==== Cupola gecko ====
The Cupola gecko is a variant of the forest gecko that is so rare that few live specimens have ever been found. In 1968 one had been observed near Cupola Hut, and a further specimen had been found in 2007. Extensive searches in 2006 and 2019 failed to uncover any further examples. Then, in 2021, four examples were found in the Sabine Valley. The Cupola gecko is described as looking similar to other forest geckos, with grey-brown colouration and either darker or lighter W- or V-shaped bands across its back. The 2021 discoveries confirm that they live in alpine regions.

==== Long-tailed bat ====
The South Island long-tailed bat (Chalinolobus tuberculatus) were, in 1900, "a common sight" in the national park. A spot one kilometre to the east of St. Arnaud was known as "bat cutting". They were observed to be declining in numbers by 1930 even though a colony of "more than a hundred bats" was observed. By the early 1990s, the species was classified as "rare" and numbers have declined further in the early 2000s in most valleys of the national park. They are still very occasionally seen by trampers.

== Conservation and human interaction ==
=== Management ===
==== Rotoiti Mainland Island ====
The Rotoiti Mainland Island consists of 5000 hectares of beech forest around Lake Rotoiti. There is a project which aims to eliminate introduced pests such as stoats, possums, wasps and rodents, and allow recovery of the forests and native wildlife populations.

The Rotoiti Nature Recovery Project has been a success in that it has reduced predator numbers on the eastern side of Lake Rotoiti. It is possible to see great spotted kiwi, robins, bellbirds, fantails, rock wrens, keas and paradise ducks as a result.

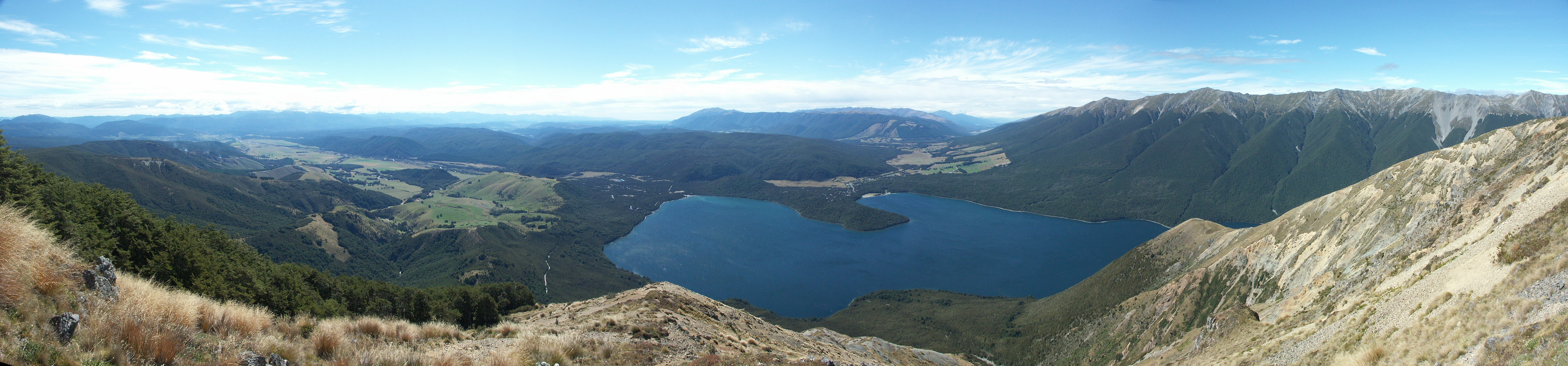
Panoramic view of Lake Rotoiti and the Saint Arnaud Range from Robert Ridge

=== Access ===
The main access point to Nelson Lakes National Park is at Lake Rotoiti and the village of Saint Arnaud, on State Highway 63, about 100 kilometres from both Nelson and Blenheim. A secondary access point is at Lake Rotoroa, turning off State Highway 6 at Gowanbridge. Shuttle services operate between St Arnaud, Nelson, Blenheim and Picton.

=== Activities ===
==== Camping ====
The main campgrounds are on the shores of Lake Rotoiti; there is a smaller campground at Lake Rotoroa.

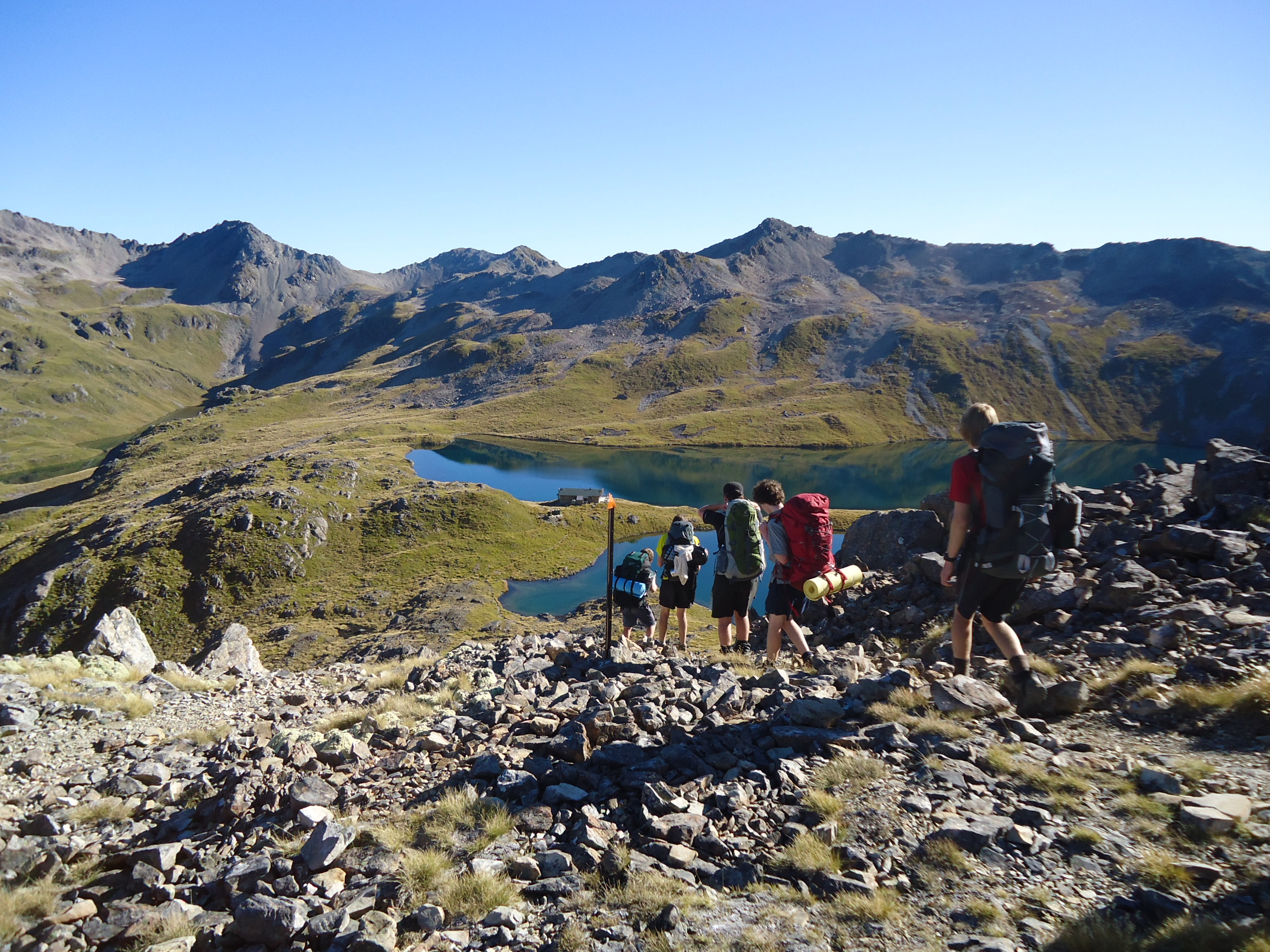
Trampers approaching Rotomaninitua / Lake Angelus in Nelson Lakes National Park

==== Tramping ====
There is a network of tramping tracks throughout the park. Tracks range from short nature walks at Lake Rotoiti and Lake Rotorua, to multi-day backcountry tramps. Day tramps include the Lake Rotoiti circuit, St. Arnaud Range and Mt. Robert. The most popular long-distance tramping routes are the Travers-Sabine Circuit and other loops through Lake Angelus. The Te Araroa trail also passes through the park over Waiau Pass.

==== Skiing ====
Rainbow Ski Area is located on the eastern side of the St Arnaud range, just outside the park on the slopes of Mount McRae.

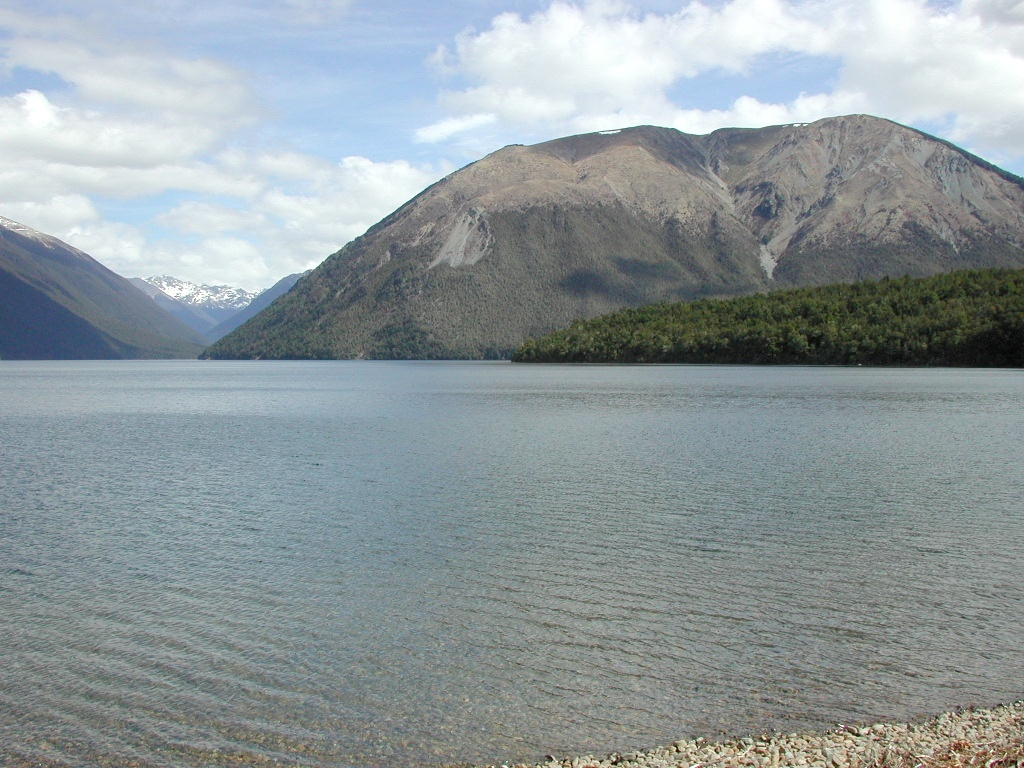
Lake Rotoiti and Mount Robert, snow-covered mountains of St Arnaud Range in the distance

The skifield on Mount Robert is no longer operational. (Mount Robert was named by Julius von Haast after his son). The ski field was first scouted for potential in 1929 and between 1933 and 1934 the Kea hut was built and the ski field established. In 1944, the Nelson Ski Club was established. In the early days, accessing the ski field was a challenge. One had to row across Lake Rotoiti and then hike to the top of Mount Robert while carrying all of one's ski gear. The ski field was closed in 2003. This was due to a lack of consistent snow and changes to when the school holidays fell during the year.

Other activities include mountaineering, boating, fishing and mountain biking.

==== Huts ====
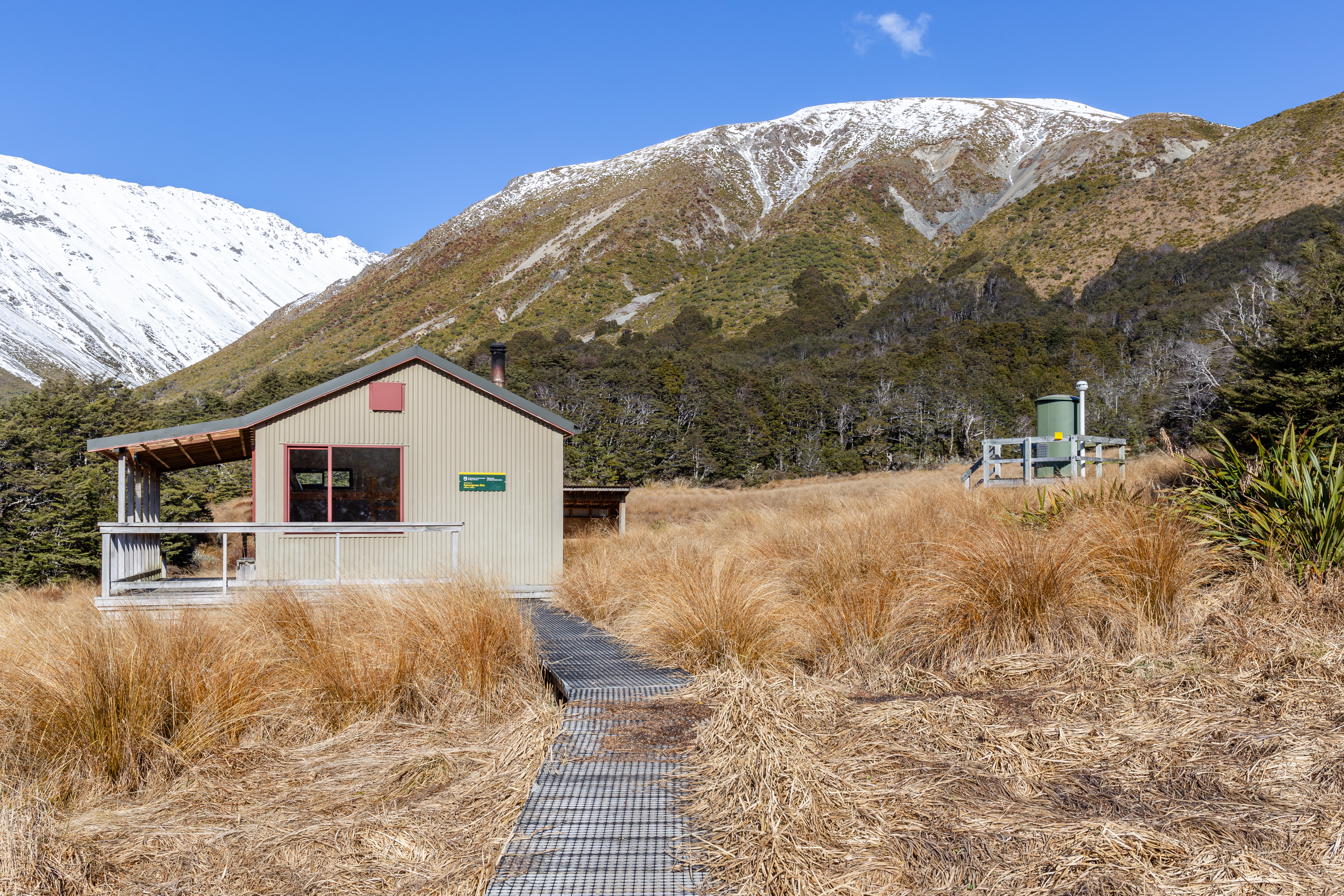
Speargrass Hut, Nelson Lakes National Park, New Zealand

Nelson Lakes National Park contains 20 Department of Conservation huts, ranging in quality from 'basic hut/bivvy' to 'serviced hut'. A 21st hut, Speargrass, is accessed via park trails, but is located just outside the park boundary, in the Howard conservation area.

Name	Type	Coordinates
Angelus Hut	Serviced Hut	41°53'17.8742"S, 172°44'54.6889"E
Blue Lake Hut	Serviced Hut	42°3'29.682"S, 172°39'18.468"E
Bobs Hut	Standard Hut	42°13'25.500"S, 172°29'10.176"E
Burn Creek Hut	Basic Hut/bivvy	42°9'22.356"S, 172°27'0.036"E
Bushline Hut	Serviced Hut	41°50'12.2708"S, 172°49'23.9059"E
Coldwater Hut	Standard Hut	41°52'13.440"S, 172°49'1.200"E
Cupola Hut	Standard Hut	41°58'18.768"S, 172°43'58.260"E
D'Urville Hut	Standard Hut	41°54'19.980"S, 172°38'46.356"E
East Matakitaki Hut	Standard Hut	42°11'36.672"S, 172°33'28.188"E
George Lyon Hut	Standard Hut	42°2'50.928"S, 172°36'18.612"E
Hopeless Hut	Standard Hut	41°55'49.465"S, 172°45'24.052"E
John Tait Hut	Serviced Hut	41°58'28.823"S, 172°46'7.385"E
Lakehead Hut	Serviced Hut	41°52'32.232"S, 172°49'19.452"E
Morgan Hut	Standard Hut	41°58'57.900"S, 172°37'51.060"E
Mount Misery Hut	Basic Hut/bivvy	41°56'3.048"S, 172°40'14.268"E
Nardoo Hut	Basic Hut/bivvy	42°5'49.056"S, 172°25'47.424"E
Sabine Hut	Serviced Hut	41°54'3.960"S, 172°40'53.076"E
Speargrass Hut	Serviced Hut	41°51'7.27"S, 172°45'8.75"E
Upper D'Urville Hut	Basic Hut/bivvy	42°6'31.248"S, 172°36'19.980"E
Upper Travers Hut	Serviced Hut	42°1'13.296"S, 172°44'59.712"E
West Sabine Hut	Serviced Hut	42°0'28.440"S, 172°41'2.400"E

=== Mountain safety ===
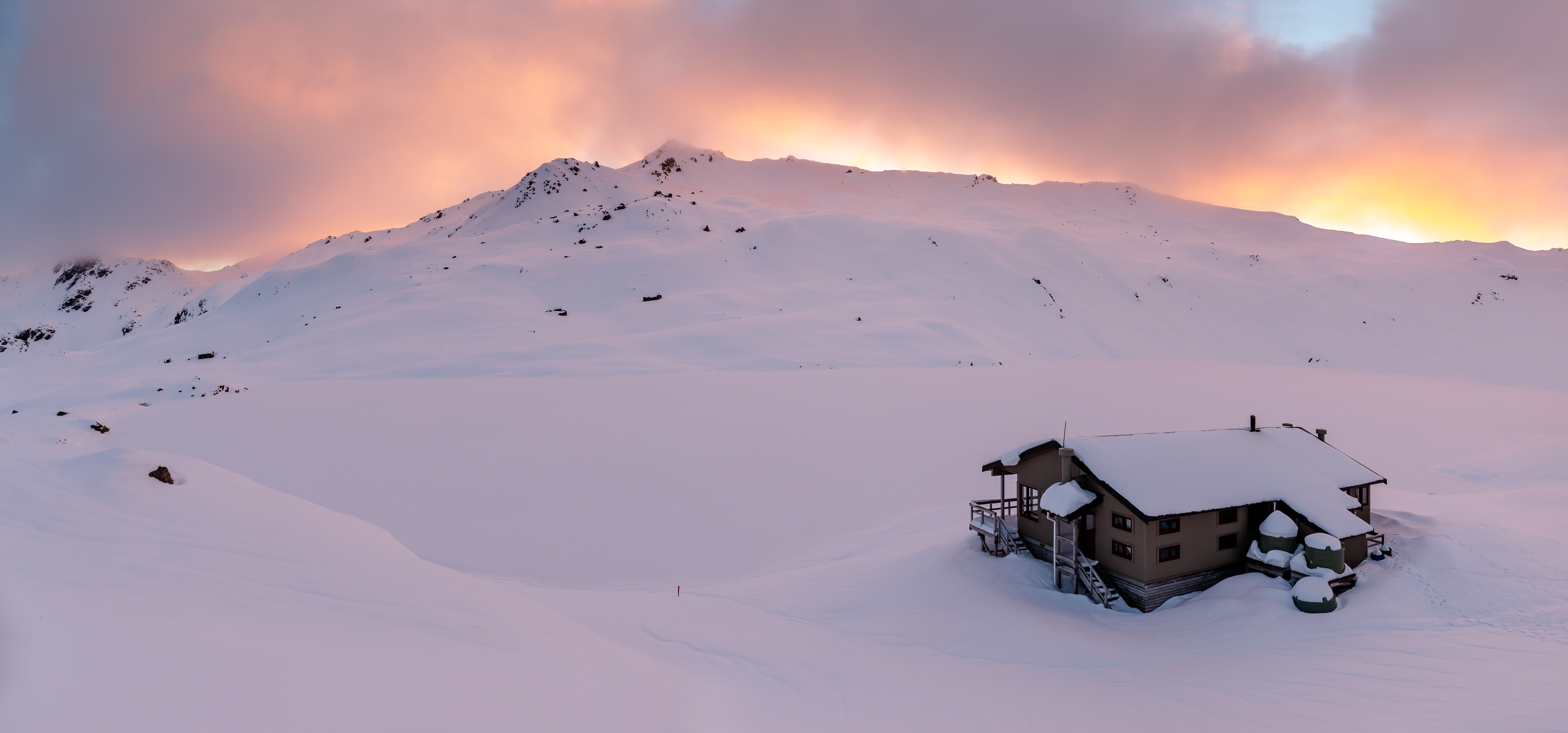
Winter. Angelus Hut with Angelus Lake behind it. In the clouds, no name peak (1860m) can be seen. Picture taken during the sunset. Nelson Lakes National Park, New Zealand

Angelus Hut, which lies in an alpine environment at 1650 m above sea level, is one of the most popular huts in the national park. It can be accessed via the Robert Ridge route, amongst a number of others. However, the Robert Ridge route is considered one of the most dangerous routes of the park in bad weather. Between 2010 and 2019, search and rescue teams rescued 45 trampers, and there were two fatalities. This represented an incidence of 1 search and rescue for every 700 trampers making the trip. Snow and poor weather can occur at any time during the year, and the combination with easy access to Robert Ridge from St. Arnaud and the scenic location of Angelus Hut may cause trampers to underestimate the difficulty of accessing the hut. During winter months, Lake Angelus (adjacent to Angelus Hut) is generally frozen over, and each of the four routes to the hut are usually covered in snow and can be very icy.

After a tourist succumbed to hypothermia while tramping alone near Angelus Hut in July 2018, more initiatives were taken to raise awareness of harsh and variable conditions in the park. Inexperienced trampers are encouraged to avoid solo trips in alpine conditions or in winter, to be aware of the weather forecast, and to take an emergency shelter, navigation equipment and an emergency communication device.

== See also ==
- National parks of New Zealand
- Forest parks of New Zealand
- Regional parks of New Zealand
- Protected areas of New Zealand
- Conservation in New Zealand
