= Lake Rotoiti (Tasman) =

Lake in the South Island of New Zealand

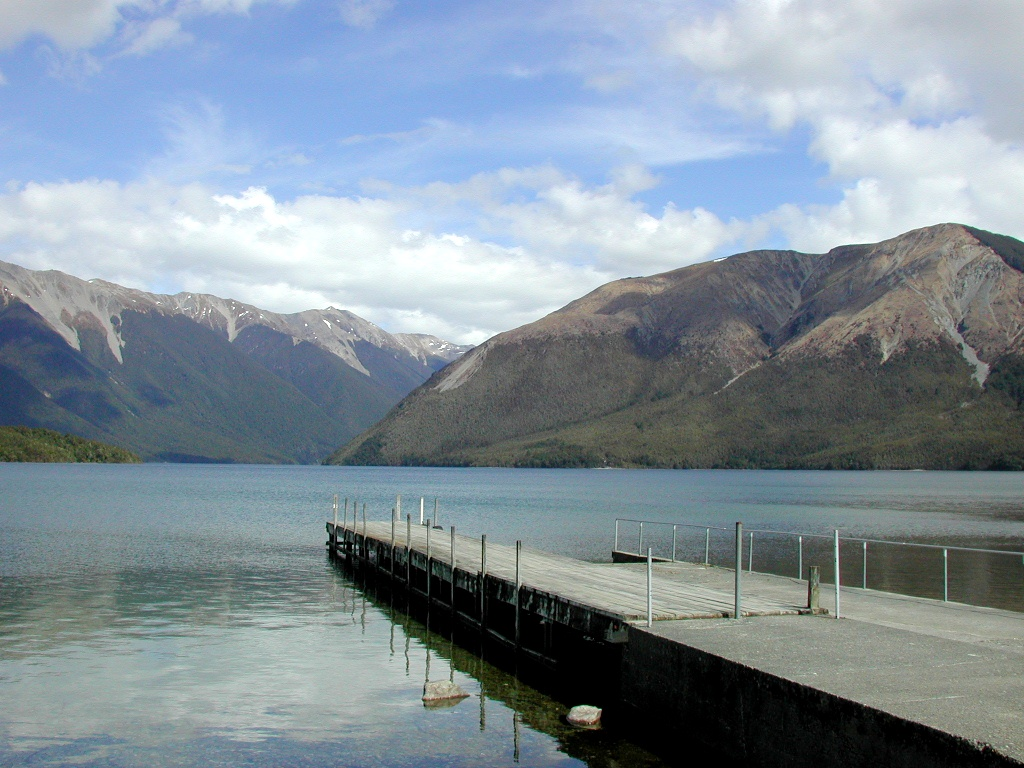
- Lake Rotoiti towards Mount Robert and St Arnaud Range

- Location within South Island
- Interactive map of Lake Rotoiti
- Location: Nelson Lakes National Park, Tasman Region, South Island
- Coordinates: 41.8245°S 172.8381°E
- Primary inflows: Travers River
- Primary outflows: Buller River
- Basin countries: New Zealand
- Max. depth: 82 m (269 ft)
- Settlements: Saint Arnaud

Lake Rotoiti, previously also known as Lake Arthur, is a lake in the Tasman Region on the South Island of New Zealand. It is a substantial mountain lake within the borders of Nelson Lakes National Park. The lake is fed by the Travers River, water from the lake flows into the Buller River. The lake is surrounded by beech forest and is 82 metres (269 ft) deep. Saint Arnaud is a small community at the northern end of the lake.

The New Zealand Ministry for Culture and Heritage gives the Māori translation of Rotoiti as "little lake".

The first European to see the lake was John Sylvanus Cotterell on 18 January 1843. Thomas Brunner and Charles Heaphy reached the lake in November 1843, and Heaphy named it Lake Arthur after Captain Arthur Wakefield, but the Māori name remained. For many years the lake formed part of Nelson politician and landowner John Kerr's beloved Lake Station - including Mt Robert. Kerr (who introduced Trout to the lake), drowned there with many believing his son Robert to be responsible. The lake and Mt Robert reverted to the crown after mismanagement by Kerr's son Robert in the years following his death. Tramping tracks circle the lake, including the Lakehead track on the east side and the Lakeside track on the west side. There is a water taxi service that travels the length of the lake ferrying trampers to and from the Coldwater and Lakehead huts at the head of the lake. Rotoiti is also a popular place for waterskiing and is adjacent to Mt Robert, which hosted a small club-owned skifield, until it was removed by DOC in 2005.

The lake has introduced trout which attract recreational fishers.

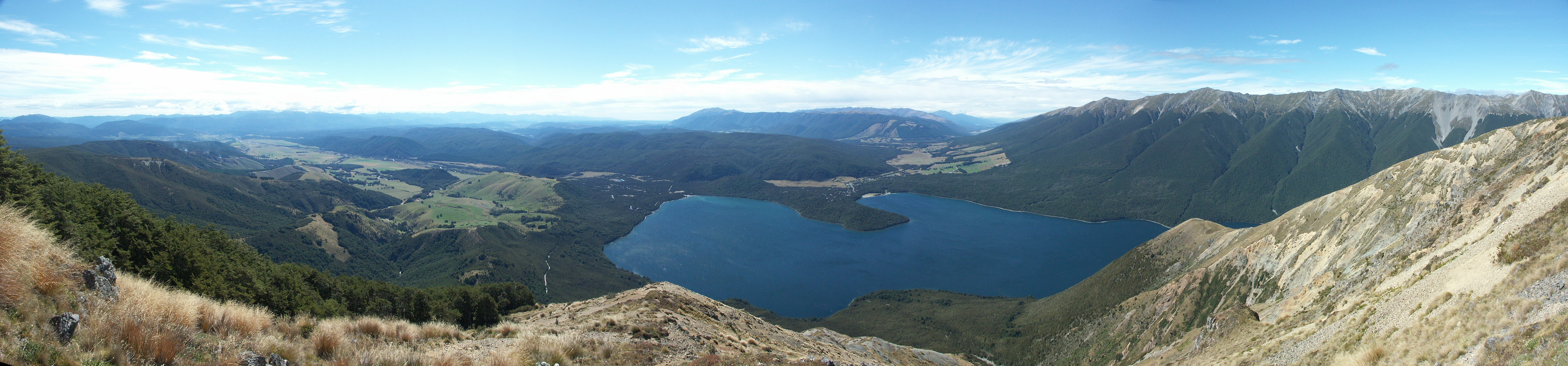
Panoramic view of the northern end of Lake Rotoiti and the Saint Arnaud Range from Robert Ridge

== Climate ==
Climate data for Lake Rotoiti, elevation 634 m (2,080 ft), (1991–2020)
Month	Jan	Feb	Mar	Apr	May	Jun	Jul	Aug	Sep	Oct	Nov	Dec	Year
Mean daily maximum °C (°F)	21.2 (70.2)	21.2 (70.2)	18.9 (66.0)	15.4 (59.7)	12.1 (53.8)	9.1 (48.4)	8.9 (48.0)	10.0 (50.0)	12.1 (53.8)	14.5 (58.1)	16.5 (61.7)	18.9 (66.0)	14.9 (58.8)
Daily mean °C (°F)	14.9 (58.8)	14.8 (58.6)	12.9 (55.2)	9.9 (49.8)	7.1 (44.8)	4.1 (39.4)	3.7 (38.7)	4.8 (40.6)	6.8 (44.2)	9.0 (48.2)	10.8 (51.4)	13.2 (55.8)	9.3 (48.8)
Mean daily minimum °C (°F)	8.7 (47.7)	8.5 (47.3)	6.9 (44.4)	4.4 (39.9)	2.1 (35.8)	−0.9 (30.4)	−1.5 (29.3)	−0.4 (31.3)	1.6 (34.9)	3.6 (38.5)	5.1 (41.2)	7.5 (45.5)	3.8 (38.9)
Average rainfall mm (inches)	131.0 (5.16)	108.9 (4.29)	121.0 (4.76)	90.1 (3.55)	116.5 (4.59)	159.2 (6.27)	104.0 (4.09)	139.0 (5.47)	154.3 (6.07)	167.8 (6.61)	149.6 (5.89)	150.7 (5.93)	1,592.1 (62.68)
Source: NIWA
