= Lake Rotoroa (Tasman) =

Lake in the South Island of New Zealand

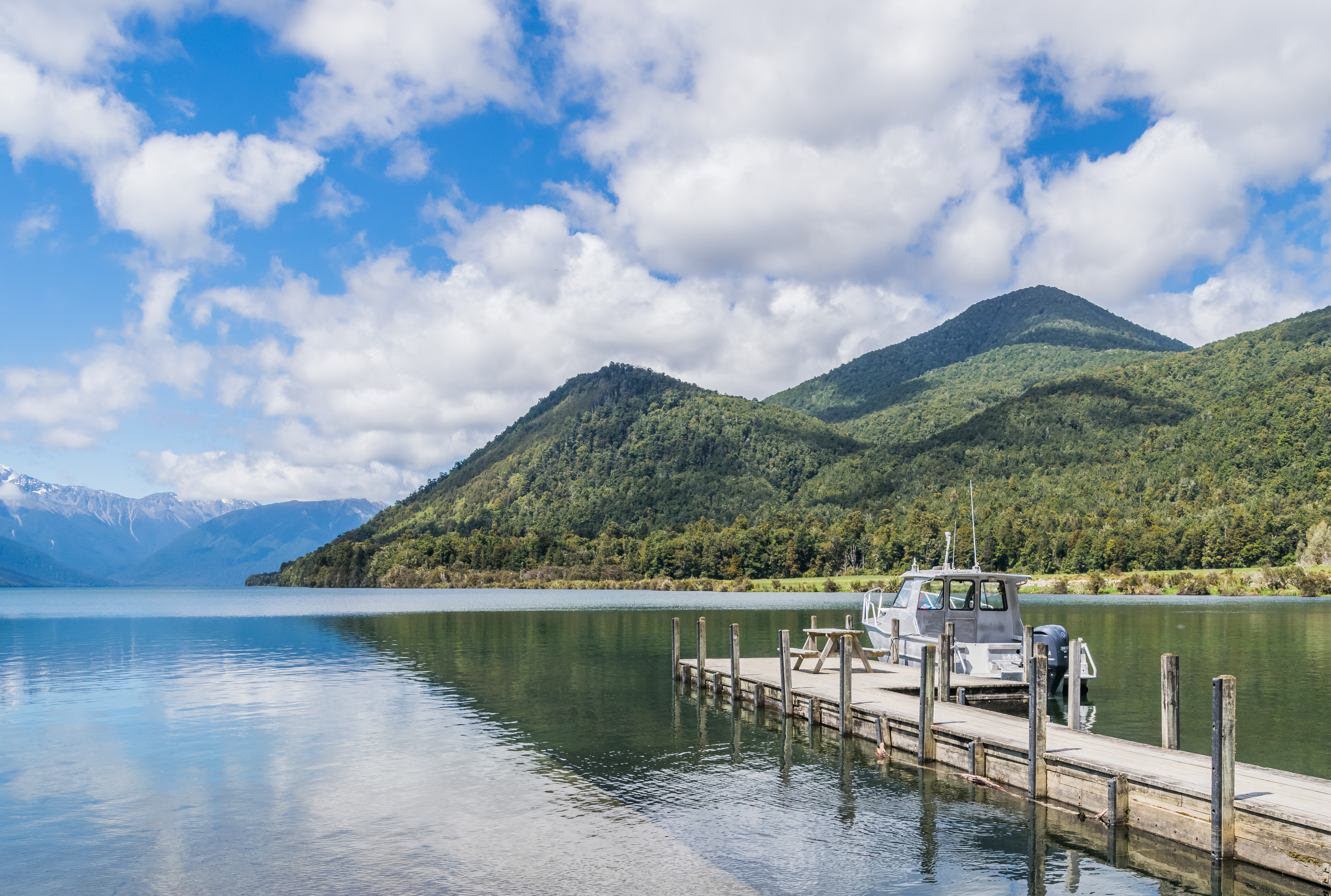
- Lake Rotoroa

- Location within South Island
- Interactive map of Lake Rotoroa
- Location: Nelson Lakes National Park, Tasman Region, South Island
- Coordinates: 41°52′S 172°38′E
- Type: Freshwater
- Primary inflows: D'Urville, Sabine
- Primary outflows: Gowan River
- Basin countries: New Zealand
- Max. length: 14.2 km (8.8 mi)
- Max. depth: 145 m (476 ft)
- Islands: One
- Settlements: Rotoroa

Lake Rotoroa lies within the borders of Nelson Lakes National Park in the South Island, New Zealand. The lake is fed by the D'Urville and Sabine rivers.

The greatest depth is 145 metres, and it has a surface area of just under 23.5 km. The lake is surrounded by beech forest. Rotoroa is a small community at the base of the lake. The Gowan River flows out of the lake at this point, thus making the lake one of the sources of the Buller River system.

The Rotoroa Route, following the northeast side of the lake, has been permanently closed to public access. Several other walking tracks can be accessed near the settlement at the head of the lake, and a water taxi travels the length of the lake to ferry trampers.

The lake has introduced trout, which attract recreational fishermen. There is a fly-fishing lodge, Lake Rotoroa Lodge, on the lake.

The word rotoroa is Māori for long lake.

== Climate ==
Climate data for Lake Rotoroa, elevation 445 m (1,460 ft), (1981–2010)
Month	Jan	Feb	Mar	Apr	May	Jun	Jul	Aug	Sep	Oct	Nov	Dec	Year
Mean daily maximum °C (°F)	20.9 (69.6)	21.2 (70.2)	19.2 (66.6)	15.7 (60.3)	12.0 (53.6)	9.1 (48.4)	8.8 (47.8)	10.4 (50.7)	12.8 (55.0)	15.0 (59.0)	17.5 (63.5)	19.4 (66.9)	15.2 (59.3)
Daily mean °C (°F)	15.1 (59.2)	15.4 (59.7)	13.5 (56.3)	10.5 (50.9)	7.6 (45.7)	5.0 (41.0)	4.3 (39.7)	5.7 (42.3)	7.9 (46.2)	9.7 (49.5)	11.7 (53.1)	13.9 (57.0)	10.0 (50.1)
Mean daily minimum °C (°F)	9.3 (48.7)	9.6 (49.3)	7.8 (46.0)	5.2 (41.4)	3.2 (37.8)	0.8 (33.4)	−0.2 (31.6)	1.0 (33.8)	3.1 (37.6)	4.4 (39.9)	6.0 (42.8)	8.4 (47.1)	4.9 (40.8)
Average rainfall mm (inches)	137.9 (5.43)	132.7 (5.22)	165.3 (6.51)	106.8 (4.20)	154.5 (6.08)	172.9 (6.81)	169.4 (6.67)	144.4 (5.69)	183.7 (7.23)	207.0 (8.15)	153.4 (6.04)	205.7 (8.10)	1,933.7 (76.13)
Source: NIWA
