= Big River =

Big River or Big Rivers may refer to:

== Geography ==
=== Rivers ===
In Australia

- Big River (Brodribb River, Victoria), a tributary of the Brodribb River, in Victoria
- Big River (Goulburn River, Victoria), a tributary of the Goulburn River, in Victoria
- Big River (Mitta Mitta River, Victoria), a tributary of the Mitta Mitta River, in Victoria

In New Zealand

- Big River (Buller), a tributary of the Blackwater River (Little Grey River tributary)
- Big River (Grey)
- Big River (Southland)
- Big River (Tasman)

In the United States

- Big River (Alaska), a tributary of the Kuskokwim River
- Big River (California)
- Big River (Michigan)
- Big River (Missouri)
- Big River (New Hampshire)
- Big River (Oregon)
- Big River (Rhode Island)
- Big River (Washington)
- Big River (Wisconsin)

In Canada

- Big River (Saskatchewan), a river in Saskatchewan

=== Communities ===
Canada

- Big River, New Brunswick, Canada
- Big River, Saskatchewan, Canada
- Rural Municipality of Big River No. 555, Saskatchewan, Canada

New Zealand

- Big River, New Zealand, abandoned mining town on the West Coast

United States

- Big River, California, United States
- Mendocino, California, formerly Big River

=== Other places ===
- Big Rivers (wine), a grape-growing zone in New South Wales, Australia
- Big Rivers Region, a region of the Northern Territory, Australia
- Big Rivers Regional Trail, a rail trail in Dakota County, Minnesota, U.S.

== Music ==
- Big River (musical), a 1985 musical by Roger Miller based on Mark Twain's novel Adventures of Huckleberry Finn
- Big River (Troy Cassar-Daley album)
- Big River (Jimmy Nail album)
- "Big River" (Jimmy Nail song)
- "Big River" (Johnny Cash song)
- "Big River", a song by Van Halen from the album A Different Kind of Truth

== Film and TV ==
- Big River (film), a 2006 film featuring Joe Odagiri
- "Big River", an episode of the TV series Dora the Explorer

== Other uses ==
- Big Rivers Australian Football League, an Australian rules football competition in the Northern Territory
- Big Rivers Conference, a high school athletic conference in Western Wisconsin
- Big Rivers Conference (Illinois), a high school football conference, 1999–2012

== See also ==
- Mississippi River (derived from Native American names meaning Big River), the largest river system in North America
- Rio Grande (literal English translation: Big River), a river that forms part of the Mexico–United States border
- Guadalquivir (derived from Arabic الوادي الكبير: Big River), the fifth-longest river in Spain and most important in Andalusia
