= Big River (West Coast, New Zealand) =

Big River (West Coast, New Zealand) may refer to:

- Big River (Buller), a river in the Buller District that is a tributary of the Blackwater River (Little Grey River tributary)
- Big River (Grey), a river in the Grey District that flows into the Grey River

== See also ==
- Big River (Tasman), a river in the Tasman District that flows into the Tasman Sea on the west coast of New Zealand's South Island
