= Stillwater–Ngākawau line =

Railway line in New Zealand

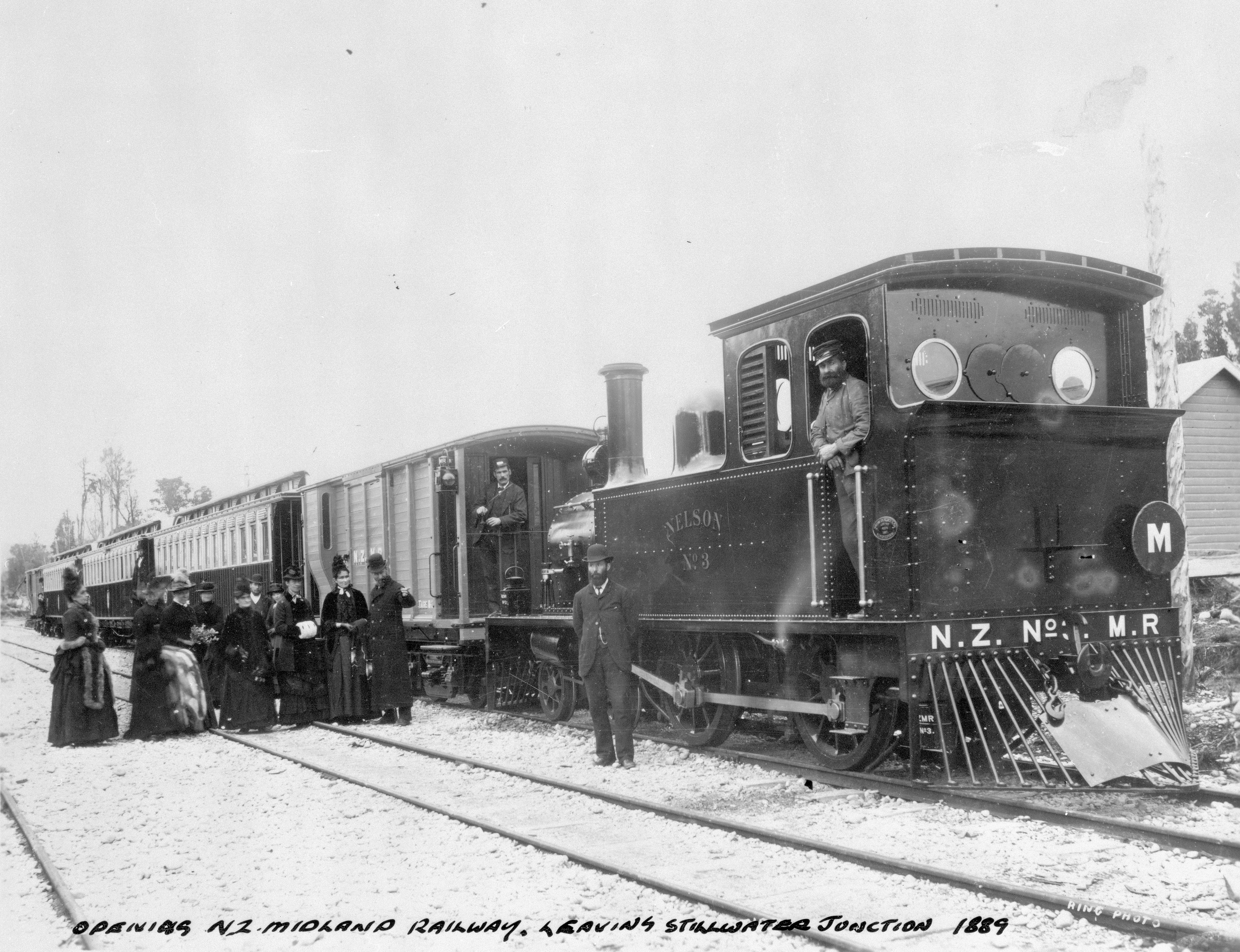
- Opening of the Midland Railway, Stillwater junction, 1889

Overview
- Status: Open
- Locale: West Coast, New Zealand
- Termini: Stillwater; Seddonville
- Stations: 14 operational 31 closed

Service
- Type: Heavy rail
- Services: 1
- Operator: KiwiRail

History
- Work began: 3 March 1874
- Opened: 31 December 1875
- Completed: 23 February 1942
- Closed beyond Seddonville: 10 February 1975
- Closed beyond Ngākawau: 3 May 1981

Technical
- Line length: 183.72 km (114.16 mi)
- Number of tracks: Single
- Track gauge: 3 ft 6 in (1,067 mm)

The Stillwater–Ngākawau line (SNL), formerly the Stillwater–Westport line (SWL) and the Ngakawau branch, is a secondary main line, part of New Zealand's national rail network. It runs between Stillwater and Ngakawau via Westport on the West Coast of the South Island. It was one of the longest construction projects in New Zealand's history, with its first section, at the south end, opened in 1889 (137 years ago), and the beginnings of the Ngākawau Branch, at its Westport end, in 1875. The full line was completed in 1942 (84 years ago). The only slower railway projects were Palmerston North to Gisborne, 1872 to 1942, and the Main North Line to Picton, 1872 to 1945.

The main traffic has always been coal. In 2021 opencast mines along the line produced 1,321,541 tonnes of coal, 984,951 tonnes of it from Stockton Mine at Ngākawau. All the other mines in the country produced only 1,234,560 tonnes.

Passenger journeys peaked at around 500 a day in 1946 and ceased in 1967. From 1891 until about 1970 the line had a refreshment room, initially at Totara Flat, then Ikamatua, then Stillwater.

== Construction ==
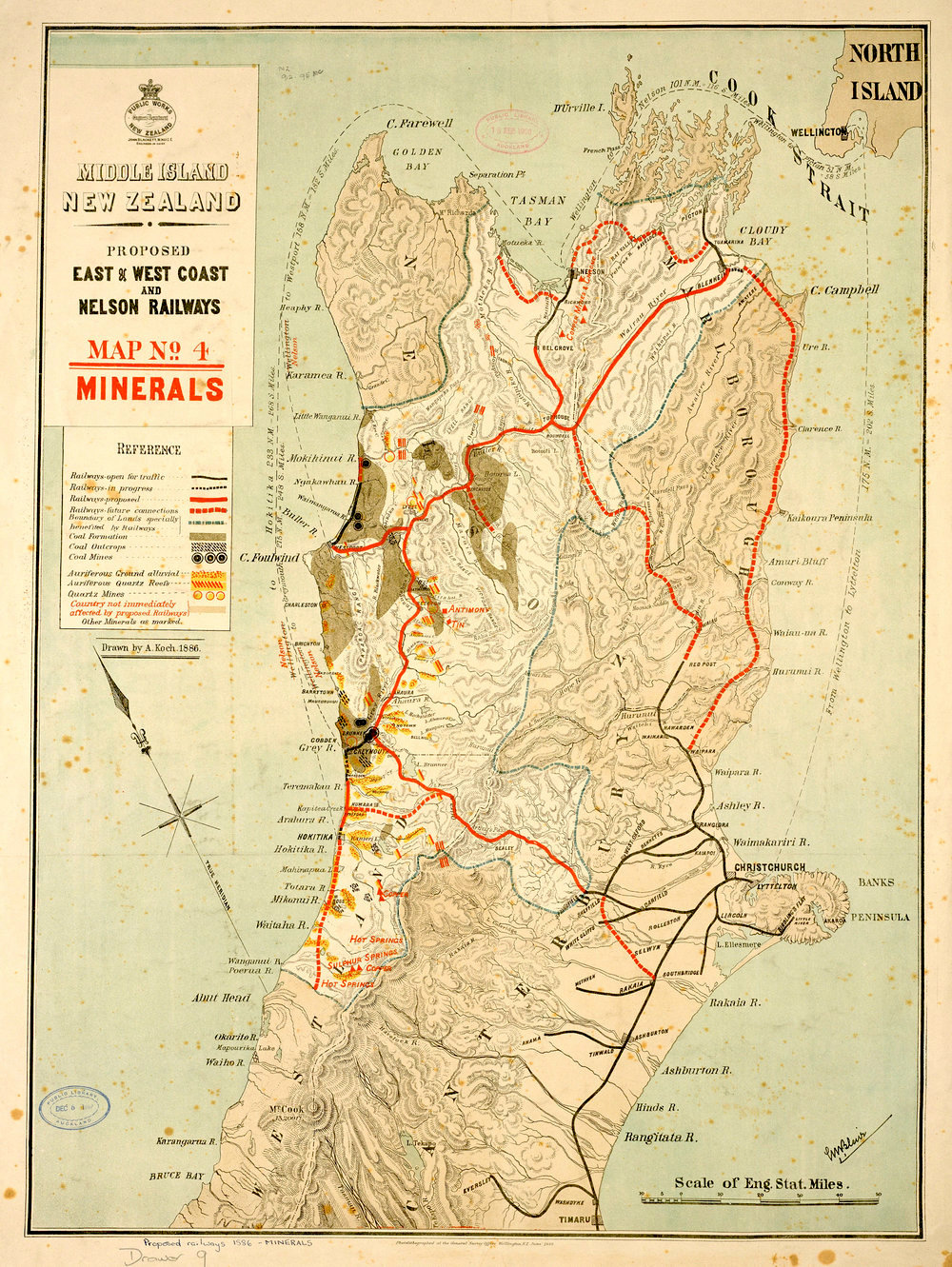
East & West Coast and Nelson Railways, as proposed in 1886

A railway link from Greymouth east to Brunner was opened in 1876, but work on a link from this point to Westport became delayed for ten years by disputes over the best route to link the West Coast with Nelson and Canterbury. A route for a railway was first proposed by the Nelson Province Engineer, John Blackett, in 1863. As this 1886 map shows, when the extension started, it was intended to be part of a much larger network, which would have linked to Blenheim, as well as Nelson. The distance from Westport to Blenheim, via a 2,380 ft (730 m) summit at Tophouse, was surveyed as 158 3/4 mi (255.5 km) and to Nelson 144 3/4 mi (233.0 km), with the longest tunnel being 33 ch (660 m), opposite Lyell. Ultimately, the New Zealand Midland Railway Company (NZMRC) was formed to construct the route, and in 1886, work recommenced. The junction of the route to Westport and the Midland Line to Canterbury was established just east of Brunner in Stillwater, and the NZMRC put most of its energy into the first portion of the SWL from Stillwater to Reefton. This was due to the comparatively easier terrain faced by the route in the valley of the Grey River, and in 1889, the line was opened to Ngahere. On 29 February 1892, the NZMRC opened the line all the way to the south bank of the Inangahua River, directly opposite Reefton, and with the Stillwater–Reefton portion complete in their view, they redirected their energy to the Midland route from Stillwater to Otira.

In the mid-1890s the NZMRC ran out of funds and, after a dispute in the courts, was taken over by the central government. Work on the SWL recommenced in the 20th century, with the Inangahua River bridged, the present-day Reefton station established, and a further section to Cronadun opened in 1908. At the Westport end, construction also commenced, with a 9 km line opened in 1912 from Westport to Te Kuha at the western end of the Lower Buller Gorge. In 1914, the line from Cronadun reached Inangahua Junction, where the NZMRC intended its lines to Westport and Nelson to diverge (in fact, Inangahua remained the probable site for a junction until all work on the Nelson Section ceased in 1931). Work was slowed after the Reform Government took over in 1912. However, the outbreak of World War I brought a halt to construction with only the section through the Buller Gorge to complete. In 1921 the slow progress of the line was being criticised and there was speculation that a route to Nelson might follow the Gowan valley.

The Railways Board reported in 1931 that the line would earn far less than the interest charges for its construction. The Buller Gorge posed many difficulties for construction, but most of the formation and 2 of the remaining 12 bridges had been built, when Parliament voted 40:22 on 8 October 1931 to back the Railways Board proposal to stop work on the Westport-Inangahua line as well. The Labour leader, Harry Holland, suggested, "the influence of the oil interests against the national railways". Some of the workers were transferred to road building. Only after the 1935 election brought about a change in government was there a serious push to complete the line (as well as the similarly postponed Main North Line). Work was formally restarted on 16 July 1936 with a first sod ceremony. The outbreak of World War II created further delays on construction, but this time, work continued through wartime, including electric signalling, a turntable at Westport and easing of grades at Omoto, Jacksons and Stillwater. The "last spike" ceremony was on 2 December 1941. The Public Works Department (PWD) was in charge of construction and were able to operate trains the length of the line by July 1942, but ownership of the route was not transferred to the New Zealand Railways Department (NZR) until 5 December 1943.

The 27 mi 32 ch (44.1 km) through the Gorge cost £1,231,636 to 1941, with about another £40,000 spent before opening. 360 were employed on the line when work was stopped in October 1931. By the end of 1932 it was 32. Labour MP, Bob Semple, called stopping the works and throwing wheelbarrows, tools, and shovels in the river, a criminal offence. When the Labour Government resumed construction in July 1936, 66 were employed, peaking at 399 in January 1937, none of whom died at work.

== Operation ==
Before the line was completed, mixed trains operated on sections open for service. During the 1917 coal strike, trains between Inangahua and Reefton were suspended. By 1927 one report said that part of the line had lost most of its passengers to motor vehicles. When Inangahua first appeared in the annual reports, 3 years later, it only sold 300 tickets in the year. In 1926 the Minister said local services between Greymouth and Inangahua had been speeded up in keeping with the course followed on the main lines. Between August 1936 and August 1938 a daily morning railcar service was provided from Hokitika on the Ross Branch to Reefton and return by a diminutive Midland railcar. Once the line was completed Vulcan railcars operated from Westport to Stillwater, where they connected with services to Christchurch, and a local service ran between Greymouth and Reefton. From 7 September 1942 there were two railcars each way between Greymouth and Westport, taking 3hr 28min from Greymouth. It was seen as a means of saving rubber and petrol during wartime. The poor roads in the region meant there was more demand for a passenger service than on many other rural routes in New Zealand that lost their passenger services by 1940, but road upgrades led to increasing competition from the private car and all passenger services on the line ceased in 1967, due to the deteriorating mechanical condition of the railcars.

Commodities such as coal, timber, and cement have been the mainstay of freight on the line, and in the 1950s, when coal was still shipped from Westport and Greymouth, the occasional closure of one port meant every operational locomotive on the West Coast was pushed into duty to haul coal up or down the SWL to the other port. Today, the coal traffic still exists in substantial quantities, but it is no longer shipped from West Coast ports; it is carried by train to the deep harbour in Lyttelton on the east coast. A 2017 report said the Stockton Mine is the main source of traffic and that, "if production were to drop significantly, the economic viability of the whole rail network west of Canterbury would be questionable." In 2019 there were 4 coal trains a day of 30 wagons, loading up to 72 tonnes gross and carrying up to 1,460t of coal per train. The Ngākawau-Lyttelton journey takes about 12½ hours for the 393 km (244 mi).

When the line was completed, U^{C} class steam locomotives were utilised on the line, with the B and B^{A} classes introduced in 1957. This was the last mainline duty performed by the B and B^{A} locomotives, and as bridges on the SWL were strengthened, they were displaced in the 1960s by the heavier A and A^{B} classes. In 1969, the SWL became one of the last lines in New Zealand to be dieselised, with the DJ class introduced. DJs were used in 1968, when the line was closed for over 3 weeks by the Inangahua Earthquake and which also caused a derailment. The quake damaged about 24 mi (39 km) of the line. In the 1980s, DC locomotives were also placed into service on the line.

One notable feature was the necessity to bank heavy trains heading south from Reefton to Stillwater due to the difficult uphill grade. This was a common feature during the era of steam locomotives, and although banking was dispensed with on most lines when the conversion to diesel-electric motive power was made, the SWL was initially an exception. Some trains had two DJ class locomotives at each end, but this practice has now come to an end, with trains usually formed and loaded in such a way that banking is unnecessary. Trains on the line are regulated by track warrants.

== Slips ==
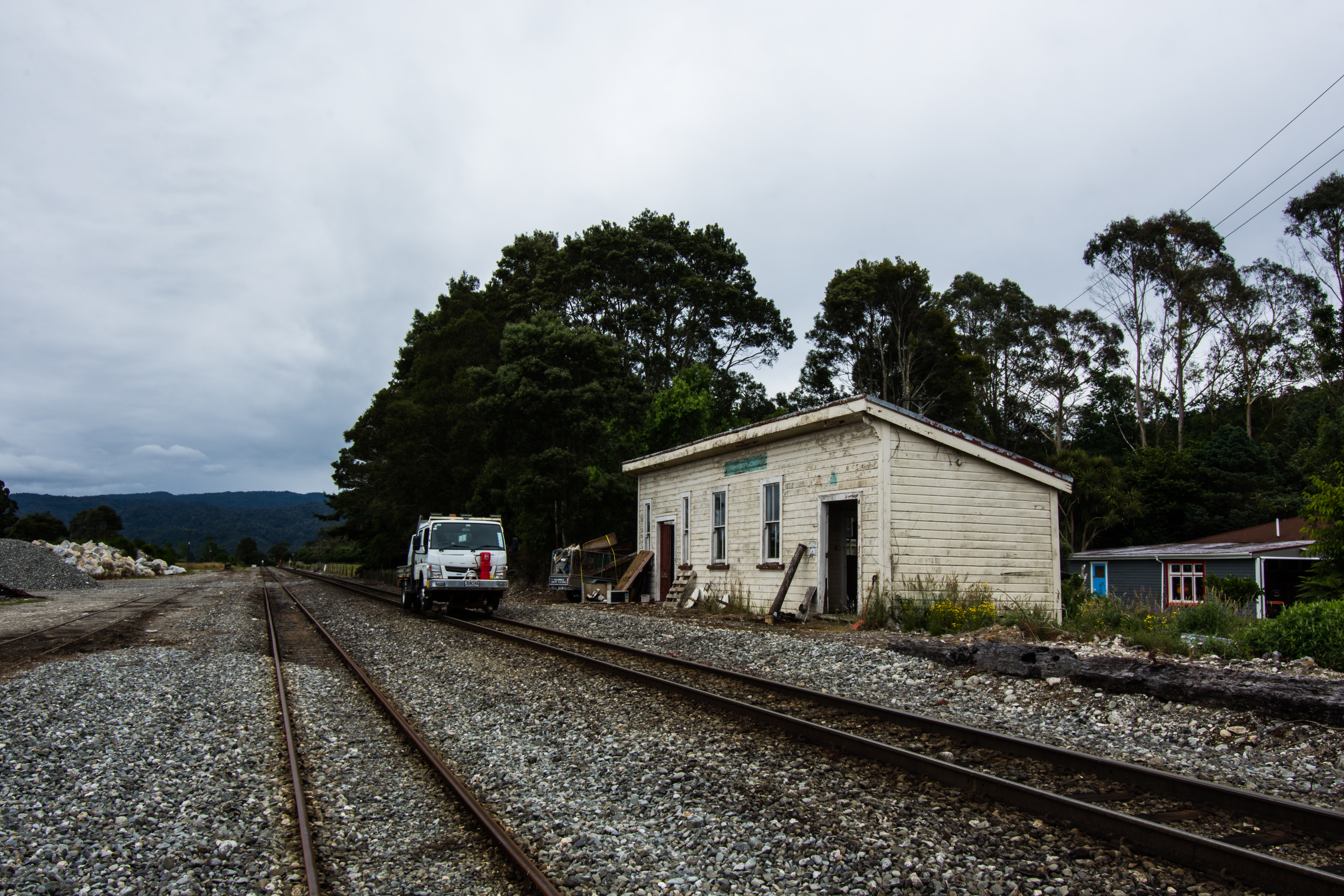
A track inspection vehicle at Inangahua in 2018

Slips have been a continuing problem in the Buller Gorge, due to steep slopes and high rainfall. During construction, broom was planted to stabilise slopes. Slips blocked the line in the Gorge in 1944, 1961, 1966 (Rahui), 1979 and 2010 In 1945 a train near Cascade was derailed by a slip, in 1949 one hit a slip and another was derailed by a stone, then in 1950 a railcar hit a slip, in 1955 a slip near Rahui derailed another and a goods train was damaged in 1960 between Cascade and Te Kuha. On 30 November 1979 a westbound locomotive was derailed by a slip near Cascade. On 3 January 2002 a train was derailed by a slip just over 3km west of Rahui. On 13 January 2011, between Rahui and Tiroroa, 5 wagons derailed due to a slip and 3 months later a slip punctured a fuel tank near Te Kuha. The south portal of Tunnel 3 was blocked by a slip, which an empty coal train ran into on 16 October 2023. The line reopened on 27 November.

A 2012 study of the problem listed another dozen slips between 2004 and 2011. With a 50 km/h (31 mph) maximum speed in the Gorge, due to curvature, there have been no serious injuries and 25 km/h (16 mph) limits are between Te Kuha and Cascade, at the worst spot, and below the limestone cliffs of Whitecliffs, where KiwiRail monitors metal pins across the limestone to check it remains stable, just west of Buller. The line is also inspected if rainfall exceeds 4 cm (1.6 in).

As mobile phone coverage in the Gorge is poor, 'Compulsory Call Location' boards are at Mackley, Berlin, Tiroroa, Cascade and Te Kuha, instructing drivers to phone Train Control to monitor the progress of trains in case of a crash.

== Stations ==
Stations and sidings on the southern section of the line (those north of Westport are listed in the Seddonville Branch article) – NB the opening and closing dates in columns 3 and 4 sometimes vary from those in the notes, which are derived from different sources.

Station Name	Distance from Greymouth	Opened	Closed	Height above sea level	Notes
Stillwater	8 mi 55 ch (14.0 km)	14 November 1887		27 m (89 ft)	Stillwater goods shed from the railway station, circa 1900 The line from Brunner via Stillwater to Ngahere opened for passengers and goods on Thursday 1 August 1889. Stillwater was the junction with the Midland Line from 15 November 1887, when that eastward route was available to Kokiri, though, apart from a few excursions, trains didn't run until 13 March 1894. The station had a small NZR refreshment room from 8 January 1927 to 15 March 1962 (taken over on lease till at least 1970) and a Post Office from 26 September 1906 to 30 June 1976. There was a fire at the station on 4 August 1960. The TranzAlpine called until 23 September 1999, after which Brunner was substituted as a stop. A platform, 8 tracks and a shed remain, with a sawmill next to the station, which has a siding able to take 17 wagons. In 1901 a detailed inventory was made of the line between Stillwater and Reefton. Stillwater was clearly the main station, with houses for the permanent-way inspector, loco foreman, manager and guard, a cadet in charge of a 3rd-class station building on a 150 ft (46 m) wood and earth platform, with 2 manager's offices, luggage-room, lamp and guard's rooms, coal-store, urinals, WC, a 50 ft × 30 ft (15.2 m × 9.1 m) goods shed, 125 ch (2.5 km) of sidings, 100 ft × 25 ft (30.5 m × 7.6 m) permanent-way store, 60 ft × 15 ft (18.3 m × 4.6 m) stable, 180 ft × 33 ft (55 m × 10 m) carriage and paint shop, 30 ft × 15 ft (9.1 m × 4.6 m) carpentry shed, 30 ft × 21 ft (9.1 m × 6.4 m) blacksmiths, 2-track engine-shed, store-room, permanent-way office, weighbridge, 2 huts, telephones connected to the manager's house and the stations between Reefton and Brunner and a triangle for turning engines. Stillwater was also one of the stations shown in the annual returns of traffic. For example, in 1924 it sold an average of 25 tickets a day and exported 62,411 hundreds of superficial feet of timber. The table below shows that by 1949 passengers had declined slightly and timber a lot. In 1922 Stillwater had two Grade 7 staff, including the stationmaster. Along the line north-east of Stillwater, the larger bridges are: Arnold River (bridge 1) 123 m (404 ft) long and, in 1901, on 6 x 66 ft (20 m) spans of lattice-iron girders, on iron cylinder piers, with concrete abutments.; Spring Creek (Reeves Creek bridge 4) is 29 m (95 ft) long and was on 44 ft (13 m) and 4 x 22 ft (6.7 m) plate-iron girders.
Kamaka	10 mi 72 ch (17.5 km)	1 August 1889	25 April 1959	26 m (85 ft)	In 1901 there was a 15 ft. by 10 ft. unfloored station-building on a 60 ft (18 m) wood and earth platform. Until 27 May 1907 it was named No Town Road. The goods siding closed on 1 April 1957. Kamaka closed to passengers and parcels on 25 April 1959, after which its building was moved to Blackball. In 1877 No Town had hotels, halls, a church (moved to Shantytown in 1969) and 148 gold miners. It was also known as Twelve Mile, its road distance from Greymouth, and still a name for the nearby creek. Only a single line remains.: No Town Creek (bridge 5) is 43 m (141 ft) long and was on 22 ft (6.7 m) and 2 x 44 ft (13 m) plate-iron girders.; No Town Creek overflow (bridge 6) is 27 m (89 ft) long and was on 4 x 22 ft (6.7 m) plate-iron girders.
Red Jacks	13 mi 46 ch (21.8 km)	1904	by 5/1966		Deadman's Creek overflow (bridge 10) is 14 m (46 ft) long and was on 4 x 22 ft (6.7 m) plate-iron girders.; Deadman's Creek (bridge 11) is 21 m (69 ft) long and was on 3 x 22 ft (6.7 m) plate-iron girders.; Red Jacks opened as a sawmill siding in 1904. In 1949 a goods train fell into a nearby patch of raupō. The fireman had a minor head injury. A passing loop remains. About 500 m (550 yd) south of the loop, in Mawhera Reserve, beside SH7, is a geared 0-4-4-0 bush loco built by G & D Davidson in Hokitika in 1913, which worked on the Red Jacks Sawmilling Co tramway from about 1924. The sawmill had a smaller Davidson in 1906. There was up to 20 km (12 mi) of tramway in the Red Jacks valley and it was extended in 1933.: McLoughlin's Creek (bridge 13) is 28 m (92 ft) long and was on 4 x 22 ft (6.7 m) plate-iron girders.; Red Jack's Creek (bridge 14) is 43 m (141 ft) long and was on 4 x 22 ft (6.7 m) and a 44 ft (13 m) plate-iron girders.; Red Jack's Creek overflow (bridge 15) is 27 m (89 ft) long and was on 5 x 22 ft (6.7 m) plate-iron girders.
Ngahere	14 mi 44 ch (23.4 km)	1 August 1889	after 1990	34 m (112 ft)	Ngahere was a temporary terminus from 1 August 1889. It opened without ceremony, but about 70 passengers travelled on the first day. At that time 2 trains a day took 35min or more, for the 9.15 km (5.69 mi) from Stillwater. On 14 February 1890 the extension to Ahaura opened to goods and to passengers on 7 April 1890. The station and stationmaster's house were improved in 1900 and there were further upgrades in 1909, in preparation for it becoming the Blackball junction in 1910. In 1901 Ngahere had a stationmaster, 3rd-class station on a 100 ft (30 m) wood and earth platform, urinals, WC, 40 ft (12 m) x 30 ft (9.1 m) goods shed with verandah, passing loop, telephone to Reefton and Stillwater and stationmaster's and platelayer's houses. In 1909 it was noted cattle yards were needed. Ngahere was one of the stations shown in the annual returns of traffic. For example, in 1924 it sold an average of 21 tickets a day and exported 62,254 hundreds of superficial feet of timber. The table below shows that by 1949 passengers had declined, but timber had increased. In 1922 Ngahere had a Grade 7 clerk. A Post Office was at the station from 25 July 1893 to 30 June 1909 and from 8 August 1938 to 21 April 1970. The stockyards closed on 26 February 1983. Ngahere closed to passengers on 11 September 1967 and to all except wagon lot traffic on 16 May 1982. Only a single line remains. This 1927 Cb Class 0-4-4-0T was on the New Forest Sawmilling tramway until 1968 Ngahere also had a junction with the New Forest Sawmilling tramway, which was still running in 1967 and extended to more than 25 km (16 mi). Locomotives working the tramway included a Heisler, L^{A} class and two former engines remain at The Ferrymead Railway.: Nelson Creek (bridge 18) is 118 m (387 ft) long and was on 5 x 11 ft (3.4 m) and 5 x 66 ft (20 m) spans, the longer ones lattice-iron girders on iron-cylinder piers.; Nelson Creek overflow (bridge 19) is 13 m (43 ft) long and was on 2 x 22 ft (6.7 m) plate-iron girders, with concrete abutments.; West Creek (bridge 21, formerly German Gully) is 20 m (66 ft) long and was on 3 x 22 ft (6.7 m) plate-iron girders with concrete abutments.
Matai	17 mi 19 ch (27.7 km)	17 April 1890	12 October 1970	41 m (135 ft)	By 1895 large quantities of timber had been cut close to the railway. In 1896 it was reported Matai had a shelter shed. By 1940 Matai had a passing loop able to hold 22 wagons. The station closed to passengers on 11 September 1967. Only a single line remains.: Callaghan's Creek (bridge 23, or 24) is 17 m (56 ft) long and was on 2 x 44 ft (13 m) plate-iron girders with concrete abutments.
Ahaura	21 mi 16 ch (34.1 km)	6 May 1890	3 November 1986	53 m (174 ft)	Ahaura in 1924 The contractors ran a train on 29 January 1890, but the first Midland Railway train to Ahaura ran on 14 February 1890, extending the service from Ngahere. Formal opening was on 1 April, the first public passenger trains ran on 7 April and it was in full use from 6 May, but, due to a delay in the bridge girders being brought from England, the station north of the river didn't open until 10 September. It remained the terminus until the line was extended to Totara Flat on 9 February 1891. By 1897 it had a 4th class station (listed as 3rd-class in 1901, with a cadet in charge, plus a 50 ft (15 m) loading bank and 2 x 29 ch (1,900 ft; 580 m) passing loops), a 100 ft (30 m) wood and earth platform, cart approach, loading bank, sheep yards, telephone, stationmaster's and platelayer's houses and urinals. A 41 ft (12 m) x 31 ft (9.4 m) goods shed was built in 1890, replaced by a 30 ft (9.1 m) x 20 ft (6.1 m) concrete block shed, completed by May 1963 and removed in March 1987. In 1902 the sheep yards were converted to cattle yards. From 17 September 1916 Ahaura became a flag station. Closure was in stages; to passengers on 11 September 1967, to all but wagon lots on 16 May 1982, to cattle on 26 February 1983 and to all traffic on 3 November 1986. Only a single line remains. Ahaura River, Bridge 28: Ahaura River 660 ft (200 m) (bridge 28) is about a kilometre south of Ahaura. In 1901 it had 10 x 66 ft (20 m) lattice girders on cylinder piers, with concrete abutments.; Orwell Creek (bridge 29) is 27 m (89 ft) long and was on 4 x 22 ft (6.7 m) plate-iron girders, with concrete abutments.; Grey River flood-opening (bridge 32) is 51 m (167 ft) long and was on 4 x 22 ft (6.7 m) plate-iron girders, concrete piers and abutments.
Raupo	24 mi 52 ch (39.7 km)	9 February 1891	28 June 1968	69 m (226 ft)	Raupo was in use for Ahaura Racecourse passengers by the end of December 1890, though the course was about a mile away. In 1900 there was a 18 ft (5.5 m) x 10 ft (3.0 m) shelter-shed on a 100 ft (30 m) wood and earth platform. A loading ramp and other work was done in 1900 and it was shown as a flag station in the 9 February 1891 timetable. By 1940 Raupo had a passing loop for 20 wagons.On 11 September 1967 Raupo closed to passengers and on 28 June 1968 to all traffic. Between 1948 and 1986 the shelter sheds were removed, leaving just a single track.: Duffers' Creek (bridge 34) is 14 m (46 ft) long and was on 2 x 22 ft (6.7 m), plate-iron girders, with concrete abutments.; Brandy Jack's Creek (Clear Creek bridge 35) is 14 m (46 ft) long and was on 2 x 22 ft (6.7 m) plate-iron girders, with concrete abutments.
Totara Flat	26 mi 19 ch (42.2 km)	9 February 1890	16 May 1982	78 m (256 ft)	Totara Flat and refreshment room c1907 1891 timetable For passengers, Totara Flat was the terminus from 9 February until the extension to Māwheraiti on 27 July 1891, with two trains a day, the fastest taking 1hr 2min for the 28.11 km (17.47 mi) from Stillwater. In 1901 Totara Flat had a 3rd-class station-building (with telephone) on a 100 ft (30 m) wood and earth platform, with a small Post Office (open until 22 August 1912), refreshment-rooms (replaced by rooms at Ikamatua from 24 June 1912), 50 ft (15 m) x 30 ft (9.1 m) goods shed, urinals, WC, coal store, 50 ft (15 m) loading bank, sheep yards, 2 passing loops and stationmaster's and platelayer's houses.Closure to passengers was on 11 September 1967, to stock on 16 May 1982 and final closure on 26 February 1983. A passing loop remains. In 1906 the village had a Midland Railway (burnt down 1926) and a Totara Flat, hotel, butter factory, school, Roman Catholic and Presbyterian churches, small public hall, 2 stores, butchery and bakery. Potatoes, oats and fat cattle were grown. The 1901 population was 188. In 2013 it was part of 61 km^{2} (24 sq mi) meshblock 2399300, with 120 people.: Grey River (bridge 37) is 234 m (768 ft) long and was on 2 x 22 ft (6.7 m) and 11 x 66 ft (20 m) plate-iron girders, on cylinder piers for the longer spans.; Grey River overflow (bridge 38) is 21 m (69 ft) long and was on 3 x 22 ft (6.7 m) plate-iron girders on ironbark piles.; Grey River overflow (bridges 39 to 41) all 4 x 22 ft (6.7 m) plate-iron girders on ironbark piles.
Ikamatua	30 mi 60 ch (49.5 km)	27 July 1891	26 February 1983	103 m (338 ft)	Just over a kilometre south of Ikamatua a 2 km (1.2 mi) balloon loop was completed in November 2008 to export coal from the Pike River mine slurry pipeline processing plant. It cost $10m and could handle 45-wagon trains. It has been little used since the 2010 Pike River Mine disaster, but sees use from time to time.; Ikamatua station The Totara Flat-Māwheraiti section opened on 27 July 1891 Initially Ikamatua was a flag station. By 1901 it had a 18 ft (5.5 m) x 10 ft (3.0 m) shelter-shed, with a telephone, on a 60 ft (18 m) wood and earth platform, 50 ft (15 m) x 30 ft (9.1 m) goods shed, coal store, sheep yard. loading bank and platelayer's cottage. Ikamatua was one of the stations shown in the annual returns of traffic. For example, in 1924 it sold an average of 9 tickets a day. The table below shows that by 1949 passengers had more than tripled. In 1922 Ikamatua had two Grade 7 staff, a stationmaster and a clerk. A Post Office was at the station from 19 August 1912 to 12 July 1926. Refreshment rooms opened on 24 June 1912. Presumably no one took up a 1926 tender, because the rooms were moved to Stillwater in 1927. Closure to passengers was on 11 September 1967, to stock on 16 May 1982 and final closure on 26 February 1983. 3 tracks remain and the station building has been moved and is used for backpackers.: In 1892 Stratford and Blair had a sawmill siding north of Ikamatua. Later they also had tramways in this area.
Hukarere	32 mi 37 ch (52.2 km)	4 September 1906	14 August 1967	113 m (371 ft)	Just over a kilometre north of Ikamatua, Snowy River (bridge 44) is 28 m (92 ft) long and was on 2 x 22 ft (6.7 m) and 44 ft (13 m) plate-iron girders on ironbark piles, and concrete abutments.; Hukarere flag station opened for passenger and parcels on 4 September 1906. In 1947 a shelter shed was approved. Hukarere translates as snow and was named after the Snowy River. In 2013 it was in meshblock 2398700, which covered the Blackwater valley and had a population of 18. Only a single line remains.: About a kilometre north of Snowy River, Blackwater River (bridge 45) is 92 m (302 ft) long and was on 8 x 22 ft (6.7 m) and 3 x 44 ft (13 m) plate-iron girders on ironbark piles.
Waimaunga	33 mi 79 ch (54.7 km)	27 July 1891	10 December 1967	123 m (404 ft)	In 1900 Waimaunga had a 18 ft (5.5 m) x 10 ft (3.0 m) shelter-shed, with a room, on a 60 ft (18 m) wood and earth platform and a platelayer's cottage. Waimaunga was a flag station, but reported to have a considerable number of passengers in 1892. In 1921 it had railway houses. It closed to passengers on 11 September 1967 and to all traffic on 10 December 1967. Only a single track remains through the station site.: Adamstown overflow Creek (bridge 46) is 13 m (43 ft) long and was on 2 x 22 ft (6.7 m) plate-iron girders, with a concrete pier and abutments.; Adamstown Creek (bridge 47) is 29 m (95 ft) long and was on 2 x 44 ft (13 m) plate-iron girders with concrete abutments.
Māwheraiti	36 mi 63 ch (59.2 km)	28 August 1891	2 March 1988	152 m (499 ft)	Māwheraiti passing loop is a couple of kilometres south of the former station site.; About a kilometre south of the station, the Māwheraiti/Little Grey river (bridge 48) is 217 m (712 ft) long and was on 2 x 22 ft (6.7 m) and 10 x 66 ft (20 m) plate-iron girders on iron-cylinder piers.; A similar distance to the north, Stony Creek (bridge 50) is 80 m (260 ft) long and was on 6 x 44 ft (13 m) plate-iron girders on ironbark piles.; Māwheraiti in 1958 On 27 July 1890 the line from Totara Flat to Māwheraiti (initially called Stoney Creek) opened. It was the terminus of the line until the extension to Tawhai on 28 September 1891. The engine shed was moved to Reefton when the line was extended there. In 1900 Māwheraiti had a 3rd-class station-building with a telephone on a 100 ft (30 m) wood and earth platform, 40 ft (12 m) x 30 ft (9.1 m) goods shed, loading bank, and 27 ch (540 m) passing loops).It still had a shelter and a phone in 1966, but closed to passengers on 11 September 1967, to all but wagon lots on 16 May1982, the stockyards closed on 26 February 1983 and the station closed completely on 3 November 1986. Only a single track, the loading bank and a shed remain, with the hotel across the road, once called Batiris, or Batira's Hotel. One of the railway houses has been moved to Reefton.
Hinau	37 mi 77 ch (61.1 km)	28 August 1891	15 November 1959	155 m (509 ft)	Hinau was a flag station. In 1900 it had a 18 ft (5.5 m) x 10 ft (3.0 m) shelter-shed, with a room, on a 50 ft (15 m) wood and earth platform. Only a single line remains.
Maimai	39 mi 63 ch (64.0 km)	28 August 1891	27 April 1980	166 m (545 ft)	Maimai was known as Squaretown until railway construction began in 1889. It was a flag station, having a 18 ft (5.5 m) x 10 ft (3.0 m) shelter-shed, with a room, on a 50 ft (15 m) wood and earth platform. Ballast was dug from beside the station, until 1914, for use along the line. In 1978 there was still a station building and siding, though closure to passengers had been on 11 September 1967. Closure to all traffic was on 27 April 1980. In 1985 a new high-level loading bank and siding were built, which is still used from time to time.: Almost a kilometre south of Maimai, Casolas Creek (bridge 57) is 55 m (180 ft) long and was on 4 x 40 ft (12 m) plate-iron girders on ironbark piles, with concrete abutments.; Little Grey River flood (bridge 58) is 172 m (564 ft) long. It was on 4 x 22 ft (6.7 m) plate-iron girders on ironbark piles.; About 500m north-east of Maimai the line crosses the Little Grey river again (bridge 61), which is 83 m (272 ft) long and was on 4 x 66 ft (20 m) iron-plate girders on iron-cylinder piers, with concrete abutments.
Tawhai	41 mi 33 ch (66.6 km)	28 September 1890	23 November 1946	181 m (594 ft)	Tawhai (initially called Slab Hut) was the terminus when the line was extended from Māwheraiti on 28 September 1891, until 29 February 1892, when it opened to Reefton. It had two trains a day, the fastest taking 2hr 17min for the 52.53 km (32.64 mi) from Stillwater. In 1901 Tawhai had a shelter-shed, with a telephone, on a 60 ft (18 m) wood and earth platform and a passing loop. It was a flag station, until opened for passengers, parcels and small goods on 23 November 1946. It closed to passengers on 11 September 1967. A passing loop remains, but not the buildings which still stood in 1986.: Tawhai Tunnel No.1 is 4 km (2.5 mi) north-east of Tawhai. It is 376 m (1,234 ft) long, under the 316 m (1,037 ft) high Reefton Saddle, at the divide between the Grey and Buller catchments. The tunnel is lined with concrete and at the Reefton end had about 5 ch (330 ft; 100 m) of timber to hold a slip, which delayed the contractors, Rees & Co., as they piled large banks of spoil around it. It also required a steeper gradient. Another large slip fell in 2010. Further repairs were needed in June 2024. Trucks moved some coal until the tunnel reopened in January 2025.
Taipo-iti	45 mi 42 ch (73.3 km)	13 May 1907	15 November 1959	193 m (633 ft)	1892 Reefton timetable There was a platelayer's cottage near tunnel on the Reefton side, and a hut at the Greymouth end, which could be linked by telephone.; Devil's Creek (bridge 63) is 13 m (43 ft) long and was on a 44 ft (13 m) iron girder with high concrete abutments.; Taipo-iti, then called Reefton, was terminus of the line from 1892 to 1907 The original Reefton station opened on the south bank of the river on 29 February 1892, when the line was extended from Tawhai. It was the terminus of the line for over 15 years, with a large goods shed and was described as a, "very handsome passenger station, dadoes and ceilings lined with linoleum, with appropriate wall papers between". In 1891 it had been known as Devil's Creek. In 1900 Reefton had a stationmaster in a special 80 ft (24 m) x 18 ft (5.5 m) building, with a verandah for its full length of the platform and a porch at street entrance. It had a booking-office, luggage-room, public lobby, ladies' waiting-room, telephone, coal-store, guards' and lamp rooms and was made in sections to allow for removal. It stood on a 200 ft (61 m) wood and earth platform. There were also toilets, 80 ft (24 m) x 30 ft (9.1 m) goods shed, with overhead crane, a loading bank, 80 ft (24 m) x 18 ft (5.5 m) engine-shed (moved from Māwheraiti), oil and coal stores, an office, stationmaster's house, two platelayers houses, outhouses, two portable huts and 75 ch (1.5 km) of sidings, with a triangle to turn engines. On 13 May 1907 the terminus was replaced by Taipoiti, a new flag station, also known as Little Devil, which was to the south. The name Taipo-iti was approved on 30 August 1906. It was an approximation of Māori words meaning Little Devil, a name given to a local stream by gold miners. It was a 5th class station, with shelter shed, platform and cart approach. Taipo-iti closed on 15 November 1959. Only a single line remains.: Inangahua River (bridge 65) is the first of 3 bridges across the river. It was built between 1902 and 1904 for £6,394. It is 208 m (682 ft) long and was rebuilt with 17 x 40 ft (12 m) reinforced concrete spans, 33 ft (10 m) downstream from the 1904 bridge, between 1962 and 1972.
Reefton	46 mi 75 ch (75.5 km)	13 May 1907		181 m (594 ft)	Reefton station in 2011. It is the only remaining Midland Railway station, having been moved from Taipo-iti Reefton, north of the river, opened on 13 May 1907. The 1892 station had been moved 1 mi 44 ch (2.5 km) to the new site. Its first major addition was a shelter from Inangahua. A staff room was added in 1951. Reefton was one of the stations shown in the annual returns of traffic. For example, in 1924 it sold an average of 51 tickets a day and exported 40,229 tons of general goods, probably mostly lignite. The table below shows that by 1949 passengers had declined slightly, but goods traffic had almost tripled. In 1925 Reefton had a Grade 6 stationmaster and 3 clerks. The station closed to passengers on 11 September 1967 and to less-than-wagonload freight in 1986. Reefton has the only remaining Midland Railway station building. It is protected with a local Category B listing. A passing loop also remains and coal is loaded just north of it. The mines at Garvey Creek and Reefton produced 112,451 tonnes of coal in 2021. Reefton Fairlie in 2011 Burke's Creek and Waitahu coal mines started about 1912, with a branch joining the railway between Reefton and Waitahu from 1919. Reefton Coal Company (otherwise known as Burke's Creek Coal Mine) railway closed in 1962, with much of its equipment sold in 1966. An 1878 Fairlie R28 worked that line from 1944 to 1948. The locomotive was rescued by a former stationmaster prior to 1978 and is now at Reefton Strand, owned by Buller District Council. A group formed in 2010 had hopes of restoring it by 2014.: Burke's Creek (bridge 66) is 20 m (66 ft) long. The original bridge was replaced by a 50 ft (15 m) concrete bridge in 1935.
Waitahu	48 mi 76 ch (78.8 km)	11 May 1908	6 November 1967	169 m (554 ft)	Waitahu in 1948 Plans for the station and its yard were drawn up in 1907. The 5 mi 31 ch (8.7 km) Reefton – Cronadun Section had goods trains from 9 May and was officially opened on 11 May 1908 by the Prime Minister, Sir Joseph Ward. However, it wasn't until 1 September 1908 that mixed trains began carrying passengers, initially only 3 times a week. By 1940 Waitahu had a passing loop for 31 wagons. Closure to passengers was on 11 September 1967 and to all traffic on 6 November 1967. Only a single track remains.: Just north of Waitahu the Waitahu River (bridge 68) was rebuilt in 1970 with 10 reinforced concrete spans on 8 concrete piers. It is 184 m (604 ft) long. The original road-rail bridge replaced an 1886 road bridge and was built in 1905 for £5,488. It was officially opened in 1906. Floods damaged it in 1917 and 1950. The approach banks at each end were reinforced with stone to resist flood damage and also replaced in 1970.
Cronadun	52 mi 30 ch (84.3 km)	11 May 1908		134 m (440 ft)	Cronadun railway station in 1946 The station was built in 1907 by E & W Sweetman of Greymouth, for £1372.9.0 and used by mixed trains from 1 September 1908. It was the terminus until about 1 July 1914, when the 18 mi 7 ch (29.1 km) Cronadun – Inangahua Section opened, though the line was used as far as Landing from 4 August 1911. The station closed to passengers on 11 September 1967, to all but wagon lots on 16 May 1982. In 1987 the low level loading bank was replaced by a high one, so that by 1988 there remained a shelter shed and a long high level loading bank. A passing loop also remains.: Boatman's Creek (bridge 70) is 69 m (226 ft) long and was the last of the bridges to be built on this section, being completed by Mr H Reynolds in February 1909 as a road-rail bridge.
Larry's Creek	55 mi 19 ch (88.9 km)	1 July 1914	17 March 1968	112 m (367 ft)	Larry River bridge 74 Morris' Siding was upgraded from a siding to a flag station in 1925. In 1926, for about a month after the bridge was damaged, it became the temporary terminus, with trains on Tuesdays, Thursdays and Saturdays until 4 December. From 5 August 1934 Morris' Siding was renamed Larry's Creek. It closed to passengers on 11 September 1967 and to goods on 17 March 1968. Only a single track remains.: Larry / Awarau River (bridge 74) is 100 m (330 ft) long It was a 325 ft (99 m) road-rail bridge of 7 spans, built in 1905 for £2,915. It is about a kilometre north of the station. It was badly damaged by floods in 1926, 1946 and 2013. It was still a road-rail bridge in 1973, though work on a road bridge was planned for 1973/74.
Rotokohu	57 mi 34 ch (92.4 km)	1 July 1914	27 April 1980	95 m (312 ft)	In 1914 Rotokohu had station buildings, 2 platelayers' cottages, shelter shed, platform, cart approach and a 39-wagon passing loop. In 1978 it had a siding, loading bank, and stockyards. It closed to passengers on 11 September 1967 and to goods on 27 April 1980. Only a single track remains.
Landing	61 mi 8 ch (98.3 km)	1 July 1914	27 April 1980	82 m (269 ft)	Inangahua cutting in 1909 Inangahua Landing bridge in 2020 A contract to build the bridges on the 8 mi 40 ch (13.7 km) Cronadun-Landing section was let in September 1910, and completed in June 1911, by which time formation of the trackbed was well in hand. As soon as the rails reached the ballast-pit at Larry's Creek, ballasting was completed. Construction material was carried from Cronadun to the Landing on 4 August 1911. By October 1911 the line had been laid a further 2 mi 5 ch (3.3 km), through a 20 ch (400 m) cutting, which is up to 56 ft (17 m) deep, to reach the Landing Bridge. Walter Kemp of Reefton put up the station buildings for £1575.7s. by 24 February 1912. When the Landing opened as a flag station on 1 July 1914 it had a station building, platform, cart approach, 20 ft (6.1 m) x 30 ft (9.1 m) goods shed, loading bank, 65 ft (20 m) x 20 ft (6.1 m) engine shed, water service and a passing loop for 28 wagons. By 1918 the engine shed was "never used, nor likely to be". The passing loop was lifted in 1941, a siding in 1949, passenger services ended on 11 September 1967 and goods on 27 April 1980.: Inangahua Landing (bridge 82) was a road-rail bridge, a 280 ft (85 m) second crossing of the Inangahua River, on pairs of 80 ft (24 m) and 60 ft (18 m) girders. It was built between 1902 and 1904 for £6,852. The present bridge is 122 m (400 ft) long and was rebuilt with 4 spans in 1977.
Oweka	64 mi 3 ch (103.1 km)	19 August 1921	17 August 1970	95 m (312 ft)	Oweka railway station in 1946 Requests to build a station at Oweka were rejected in 1919 and 1920, though access to a flag station, with a shelter built by the sawmill workers, was mentioned in 1920. On 19 August 1921 the flag station formally opened for passengers, parcels, and small lots of goods traffic, 2 mi 34 ch (3.9 km) north of Landing. In 1923 a timber mill siding was built 23 ch (460 m) south of the station and about that time, the building and platform were moved to be opposite that siding. In 1926 the Minister of Railways wrote, "With further reference to the petition forwarded by you on behalf of the settlers of the Oweka district requesting that Mr P. J. Higgins’s private siding be made available for public use, I have to inform you that it has been decided to accede to the request, and the siding will be available to the public in future", though that seems to have happened a week earlier, on 22 September 1926. A road was built to the station shortly after. In 1928 Oweka became the site of one of the camps for workers on the railway extension through the Buller Gorge. From 22 January 1957 the station was moved to be opposite one of Jack Brothers sawmills, 3 mi (4.8 km) north of Landing. The shelter was demolished on 26 November 1963 and the platform was destroyed by the 1968 earthquake, but formal closure wasn't until 17 August 1970. The quake also caused a slip, blocking the road and the railway. Only a single track remains.
Inangahua	65 mi 62 ch (105.9 km)	1 July 1914		61 m (200 ft)	Inangahua station in 2011 The records say that Inangahua Junction station served Inangahua Junction from 1 July 1914 for goods, or 7 May for passengers, but the newspapers of the time said Saturday 4 July was the opening day, with morning and evening trains, taking 75 or 80 minutes for the journey from Reefton. Tenders for the station building were invited in October 1913, estimated to cost £450, and when opened it had a station building and a platform with a cart approach. Cattle yards were soon added and provision for more timber traffic was made about 1920. From 16 October 1929 it was upgraded to an officered station. In its first recorded 5 months the station sold 200 tickets and sent away 6,222 pigs and sheep. 705 tickets were sold in the first full year and 1,270 by 1938. 3,481 were sold in the first year of through services and ticket sales peaked at 4,934 in 1944. Beyond Inangahua the line was to split, one part going to Nelson and the other to Westport. Both required expensive cuttings, bridges and tunnels to get through the deep and narrow Upper and Lower Buller Gorges. The two year old Reform Government postponed work on the extension shortly before the line opened to Inangahua and World War I started weeks after it opened. Therefore Inangahua remained a terminus for 28 years. The Lower Gorge was the most difficult section of the railway, with 12 bridges, totalling 3,603 ft (1,098 m), and 5 short tunnels in its 18.5 mi (29.8 km). Work on the Westport – Inangahua railway stopped again on 21 October 1931 and restarted on 30 July 1936, after election of a Labour Government. A goods shed opened at Inangahua in 1932 and a 4-ton derrick crane from Coalgate was moved to it in 1934. By 1940 it had a crossing loop and goods shed road and a small goods shed was removed. PWD started running goods trains beyond Inangahua from 24 April 1942 and passengers from Monday, 7 September 1942 using the new railcars. The Junction part of the name was dropped from 9 August 1943 and NZR took over working the whole line on 5 December 1943. Prior to that Inangahua's Class F shunter was sent to Westport in exchange for a diesel tractor from Mackley ballast pit. Two railway houses were built in 1955. Inangahua closed to passengers on 11 September 1967. There was a turntable north of the station, which was removed in 1971. In 1972 the goods shed burnt down. Passing loops remain.
Buller	67 mi 1 ch (107.8 km)	5 December 1943	20 June 1971	58 m (190 ft)	Buller from the north in 1959: Inangahua River (bridge 85), a former road-rail bridge. is the 3rd crossing of the river. It is 540 ft (160 m) long on 9 x 60 ft (18 m) steel-plate-girders on concrete piers. It was started in 1926, but finished in 1938. Rails were laid to the Buller bridge by 1940, after which work was delayed by loss of staff to World War II. From 1 February 1943 Buller became a stopping place for rail-cars, which also carried parcels. During construction it was the site of a PWD camp. Buller closed to passengers on 11 September 1967 and to all traffic on 20 June 1971. The station building was sold in 1972. Buller River bridge No.89 in 1959; 1968 earthquake damage: Buller River (bridge 89) is 206 m (676 ft) on 30 ft (9.1 m) + 6 x 100 ft (30 m) + 45 ft (14 m) steel-plate-girder spans resting on 8 ft (2.4 m) diameter piles; Bridge 90 is a 30 ft (9.1 m) steel-plate-girder.; Where the railway runs below the limestone cliffs of Whitecliffs, KiwiRail monitors metal pins fixed across the limestone to check the boulders remains stable and won't fall on the track.; Welshman Creek (bridge 91) is 37 m (121 ft) long on 100 ft (30 m) + 2 x 25 ft (7.6 m) steel-plate-girder spans on concrete piers and abutments, built 1939–43.
Mackley Ballast Pit	71 mi 26 ch (114.8 km)	1942	by 1962	47 m (154 ft)	A ballast pit at the Orikaka River, a short distance north of the main line, was open by September 1942. It had closed by 1962. The line in this area needed drainage and a deep gravel foundation.: Orikaka River (bridge 92) is 92 m (302 ft) long on 3 x 100 ft (30 m) steel-girder spans on concrete piers, founded on cylinders, of which 2 were in position in 1941 The girders were made at Hillside works.
Rahui	73 mi 8 ch (117.6 km)	5 December 1943	2 August 1964	45 m (148 ft)	Rails had been laid 16.5 mi (26.6 km) from Westport by the end of 1940, about midway between Rahui and Tiroroa. Rahui opened on 5 December 1943, closed to freight on 2 August 1964, to passengers on 11 September 1967 and the crossing loop was removed on 12 March 1982. Buller Gorge Coal Company's mine opened about 1942 and, in 1949, 3 miners produced 2,978 tons of brown coal. From 25 July 1942 it had a private siding 15 ch (300 m) from Rahui station, as did the sawmill. Nelson Creek Sawmilling Company's mill burnt down in 1948, but had been rebuilt by 1953. It had a steam rail tractor, with a certificate which expired in 1959. A Marshall portable steam engine was moved from Rahui in 1978. In 1964 there was a small group of buildings at Rahui. Only one small building now remains, beside a single track. Lake Rahui is about 2km north of the station. In 1917 it was described as no more than a few feet deep, with portions free of flax and raupo. It is probably the remnant of a larger ox-bow lake in a former channel of the Buller. It has been part of the Orikaka Ecological Area since 2001, as lowland swamp forests are rare in the area and it has roroa. There are six bridges and two tunnels between Rahui and Tiroroa, including –: Tracy Stream (bridge 94), almost a kilometre south west of Rahui, is an 8 m (26 ft) R.S.J. bridge, which was well advanced in 1941.; Bridge 95 was replaced by a culvert in 1977.; Slaty Creek (bridge 97) is crossed by a 260 ft (79 m) reinforced-concrete arch bridge. On 2 December 1941 the former Minister for Public Works, Bob Semple (the Prime Minister couldn't fly from Wellington due to fog) drove in the last spike, made of chromium, at Slaty Creek. 700 were at the ceremony.; Newman Creek (bridge 98) is 92 m (302 ft) long on 8 x 40 ft (12 m) + 20 ft (6.1 m) reinforced-concrete-girder spans on reinforced-concrete piers and abutments.; Stable Creek (bridge 99) is 132 m (433 ft) long and was finished in 1939, with 10 x 40 ft (12 m) + 20 ft (6.1 m) reinforced-concrete-girder spans on reinforced-concrete piers and abutments, 60 ft (18 m) high, in a 20 ch (400 m) curve.; Hawk's Crag (tunnel 2) is 282 m (925 ft) long. It cuts through a spur of Mount Cassin, where the river rounds Dee Point, opposite Hawks Crag. In 1930 three men were killed and a fourth badly injured, when a gelignite charge exploded prematurely. The tunnel was completed in 1939.; Tunnel 3 is 250 m (820 ft) west of Tunnel 2 and 55 m (180 ft) long All the tunnels were complete by 1939, the last two being these tunnels, 2 and 3.
Tiroroa	80 mi 68 ch (130.1 km)	5 December 1943	17 August 1959	37 m (121 ft)	Tiroroa (sometimes Tiriroa) has the only remaining passing loop in the Gorge, 115.19 km (71.58 mi) from Stillwater, 24.2 km (15.0 mi) from Inangahua and 12 mi 47 ch (20.3 km) from Westport. The 1910 map showed that some formation work reached beyond Cascade Creek to Sinclair's Castle. It was decided in 1927 that work on the line through the Gorge would resume, so funding in 1928 was raised from £25,895 to £80,000, when bush along the route was felled from Sinclair's Castle, at 10 mi 40 ch (16.9 km), to east of Tiroroa at 13 mi (21 km). Initially it was done by relief workers, but, when funding was increased, co-operative gangs were formed and workers rose to 350, housed in construction camps (see below). A 1936 report said the work to be done was completion of the formation to 27 mi 6 ch (43.6 km), including large cuttings and banks, which had only been started when work stopped in 1931, clearing many slips in the unfinished work, 18 bridges, including Big Cascade, Buller River, and Inangahua River, tunnels, culverts, ballasting, platelaying and station buildings. When work stopped, most plant and stores had been sold and had to be replaced, so the cost of completion was about £750,000, and it was thought it could be done in 3 years. By 1941 only a large filling, battering of steep faces, removal of slips, and trimming and grading remained to be done. Platelaying was by PWD and a contractor. In 1986, a cement wagon derailed at Tiroroa. There are 3 bridges and a tunnel between Tiroroa and Cascade, including –: Redmond Creek bridge in 1939 Redmond Creek (bridge 100), a reinforced-concrete arch bridge, 68 m (223 ft) long, with an 85 ft (26 m), or 80 ft (24 m) arch and 3 x 40 ft (12 m) spans. A temporary bridge was built in 1928.; Bridge 101 is 29 m (95 ft) long, on 3 x 30 ft (9.1 m) steel-plate-girder spans on mass-concrete piers and 82 ft (25 m) of mass-concrete retaining-wall.; Tunnel 4, 5.01 km (3.11 mi) west of Tiroroa, is 153 m (502 ft). D. McLennan broke through with a small heading in his Big Ohika contract, and had much of the Westport end built by 1914.
Cascade	83 mi 76 ch (135.1 km)	18 November 1943	18 August 1958	30 m (98 ft)	First Cascade coal train in 1927. The locomotive is now preserved at Westport (see below) At Cascade Creek, 8 mi 71 ch (14.3 km) from Westport, a 5 ch (100 m) siding diverged from the main line to serve the coal bins at the foot of the 7.5 mi (12.1 km) flume from the Westport Coal Co mine. Bins at the mine held 1000 tons and at the siding 300 tons. The line was extended 2 mi 65 ch (4.5 km) from Te Kuha to serve the mine. In May 1910, 6 contracts were let, plus 18 in May 1911, extending the line from Te Kuha, to near Sinclair's Castle, 10 mi (16 km) from Westport. In 1915, during the war, the government announced no more work would be done. Except for the bridges, most of the line had been built by 1916. It had been hoped that work to 12-Mile would be done during 1914. Work restarted in 1924, when the mine was being prepared. In 2 years, the formation to Cascade Creek had been finished, ballasting and platelaying had reached Little Cascade Creek, 36 ch (720 m) from Cascade and other bridges were nearly complete, with a 5 acres (2.0 ha) ballast-pit used as aggregate for the concrete piers of the bridges. The first coal train left Cascade, after a formal opening on 20 July 1927, carrying about 175 tons. The mine is at the south end of the Denniston Plateau, and just east of the Escarpment mine. It became a State Mine in 1948. Bathurst Resources bought it in 2010 and started open cast mining of semi-soft coking coal. In May 2016, the mine was placed on care and maintenance, when Westport cement works closed. The site should be fully rehabilitated in 2022/3. Cascade Creek bridge in 1939: Cascade Creek (bridge 102) is 136 m (446 ft) long, on 4 high reinforced-concrete piers, carrying 5 x 80 ft (24 m) + 40 ft (12 m) steel girders on a 7 1/2 ch (150 m) curve. A 2ft gauge line was built to supply worksites, using petrol locomotives. In 1930 a workman was killed by a plank falling from the bridge. When work stopped on the rest of the line in 1931, it continued on the foundation cylinders, as they were near completion, though the steel girders stayed in Te Kuha yard.; Tunnel 5 is 151 m (495 ft) By 1914 Maxwell and Mann had driven much of the tunnel.; Little Cascade Creek (bridge 103) is 87.674 m (287.64 ft) long, with 20 ft (6.1 m), 2x 30 ft (9.1 m), and 4x 50 ft (15 m) plate-girder spans on concrete piers.; Bridge 104 is 58 m (190 ft) long, on 2 x 40 ft (12 m), 2 x 30 ft (9.1 m), and 2 x 20 ft (6.1 m) steel girders on concrete piers, and was completed in 1927/28.; Tunnel 6 is 47 m (154 ft) long.; Windy Point (tunnel 7) was just east of the Nine Mile Hotel at Te Kuha. It was lined with 1 ft (30 cm) of concrete, as it went through broken granite. It was daylighted in 1987 after a week of rain caused a landslide, which demolished half of it.
Te Kuha	86 mi 61 ch (139.6 km)	1 April 1912	1 August 1960	17 m (56 ft)	Te Kuha was 6 mi 15 ch (10.0 km) east of Westport and 2 mile 65 chains west of Cascade. The first sod for the Westport-Inangahua railway was turned on 20 January 1906. The first 5m 60ch of the Westport-Inangahua line was largely finished by 1908, except that the bridging contractor fell ill and asked to be relieved of his contract. By 1909 there was a temporary goods shed. In 1911 a temporary engine shed and platelayers' cottages were built and there was a Post Office in one of the cottages. Apart from station buildings, the line was ready by October 1911. J H Carew of Westport tendered for the station buildings in 1911 and completed them by 17 February 1912 for £1501 19s 10d. NZR took over the line from PWD on 31 January 1912, or maybe the 19th, though regular trains didn't run until 1 April. However, it closed on 13 June 1913, a year after a change of government, "owing to its being only a short isolated length the traffic was almost negligible." Staff and materials were then moved to the North Island. The station reopened about March 1924 By 1926 it had a shelter shed, platform, cart approach, 20 ft (6.1 m) x 30 ft (9.1 m) goods shed, loading bank and a 19 wagon loop. In 1928 an engine-shed, blacksmith's shop, cottage and several single huts were added. A gradient of 1 in 32, just east of Te Kuha, was eased to 1 in 120 (apart from a short 1 in 90 grade, just north of Inangahua, it is the steepest eastbound gradient). In 1941 the station buildings, previously used for storage, were renovated. In 1950 Te Kuha goods shed was moved to Elmer Lane maintenance depot, Greymouth, and the siding was lifted. On 1 August 1960 Te Kuha closed to all traffic. Only a single track remains.
Ferry	87 mi 55 ch (141.1 km)				A station at Ferry was approved in 1907, but not built.: Orowaiti Overflow (bridge 110) has 28 piers and is 180 m (590 ft) long.
Queen Street	92 mi 49 ch (149.0 km)	6 January 1951	12 February 1968		Queen Street in 1958 Queen Street was a flag station, originally proposed for service by the railcars in 1943. By October 1944 it had a 6 ft (1.8 m) x 18 ft (5.5 m) shelter shed, formerly a weighbridge building at Darfield. A 110 ft (34 m) long platform, 18 in (46 cm) above rail level, was completed by April 1951. It closed to passengers on 11 September 1967. The platform and a single track remain.
Westport	93 mi 35 ch (150.4 km)	5 Aug 1876		5 m (16 ft)	Westport station in 1960. The footbridge linked the station to the goods shed, which now houses the Westport Railway Preservation Society On Wednesday, 9 September 1874 the first sod of the Westport and Mount Rochfort Railway was turned in Palmerston Street, Westport, by the Buller MP, Eugene O'Conor. In 1876 William Smith built much of the railway and the first 4th class station and, Walter Bull, the stationmaster's house. The first section of the Westport and Mount Rochfort Railway opened to Fairdown on 31 December 1875. Plans for a new station were made in 1897 and by 1898 there was a 2nd class station, platform, cart approach, 51 ft (16 m) x 19 ft (5.8 m) goods shed, loading bank, cattle yards, hand crane, coal bunker, weighbridge, engine shed and urinals. In 1906 there was a staff of 41 at the station and about another 50 in the railway workshops, which had been established in 1880. In 1925 Westport had two Grade 2 stationmasters and 24 other senior staff, as well as many more lower grades. The workshops and engine sheds each had 34 staff. The line between Westport and Seddonville had 14 engines, 10 carriages, 673 coal hopper wagons and 27 other wagons. The works had a blacksmiths' shop, machine-shop, erecting and carriage and wagon repairing shop and a shop for repairing coal-hoppers. By 1972 staff were down to 19. Cape Foulwind Railway was linked to Westport by a bridge in about 1888. The Cape Foulwind station was moved near to Rintoul Street in 1889. It had a platform, loading bank and goods shed. On 31 December 1967 the station was burnt down in a suspected arson attack. A new station and Road Services terminal opened on 25 February 1971. The engine shed was demolished in 1973. The station closed to passengers on 11 September 1967. Cement silos on the wharf were demolished after the Holcim cement works closed in 2016. In March 2022 Toki bridge was opened in place of the old footbridge to the goods shed, where the Westport Railway Preservation Society, formed in March 1993, had one of the line's original engines, a NZR C class (1873), rescued from a dump in Buller Gorge, a Milburn Cement shunter, a guard’s van and various wagons. The area was damaged by flooding in 2022 and the shed was demolished in 2023, after rehousing the preserved stock, some at the National Railway Museum of New Zealand.

The table below shows Reefton as the main intermediate passenger station in 1949, but the mainstay of the line was 'goods' and 'other goods' at Waimangaroa and Granity, which were very likely mostly coal, which remains the main traffic on the line.

Category	Stations ▶	Stillwater	Ngahere	lkamatua	Reefton	Inangahua Junction	Westport	Waimangaroa	Granity
Category	Type	Stillwater	Ngahere	lkamatua	Reefton	Inangahua Junction	Westport	Waimangaroa	Granity
Number of passenger journeys	First class	92	46	19	98		446	16	32
Number of passenger journeys	Second class	8,986	5,744	9,955	15,040	3,630	27,489	228	905
Number of passenger journeys	Season tickets	65	83	65	188		185		
Outward traffic	Cattle and calves	177	1,818	914	1,794	1,267	2,336	10	245
Outward traffic	Sheep and pigs	1,724	12,563	7,148	6,031	5,155	2,141		
Outward traffic	Timber ( hundreds of superficial feet)	9,907	117,087	36,111	16,943	9,436	11,096	560	3,759
Outward traffic	Other goods	94,269	75,411	2,619	115,765	45,613	21,707	80,563	272,453
Outward revenue (NZ$)	Ordinary passengers	1,916	1,504	1,983	4,434	871	11,810	257	885
Outward revenue (NZ$)	Season tickets	41	77	73	202		247		
Outward revenue (NZ$)	Parcels, luggage and mails	107	176	141	364	141	832	130	78
Outward revenue (NZ$)	Goods	48,059	92,573	15,289	122,188	19,386	41,894	23,196	145,222
Outward revenue (NZ$)	Miscellaneous	12	19	8	2,377	39	11,242	233	229
Outward revenue (NZ$)	Total value forwarded	50,135	94,349	17,499	129,565	50,437	66,025	23,816	146,515
Inward traffic	Cattle and calves	504	689	860	746	293	1,108	37	122
Inward traffic	Sheep and pigs	1,509	3,730	5,163	2,018	1,806	3,901		657
Inward traffic	Timber ( hundreds of superficial feet)	364	423	578	4,480	13,408	4,493	3,100	1,043
Inward traffic	Other goods	959	3,583	4,084	7,694	5,531	334,689	3,021	5,086

These graphs show the variation over time in passenger numbers at Westport, Inangahua, Reefton and Ngahere (detail shown in table below). Westport peaked in 1946, Reefton in 1943 and Inangahua in 1944, during wartime restrictions on fuel and shortly after the full line was opened:

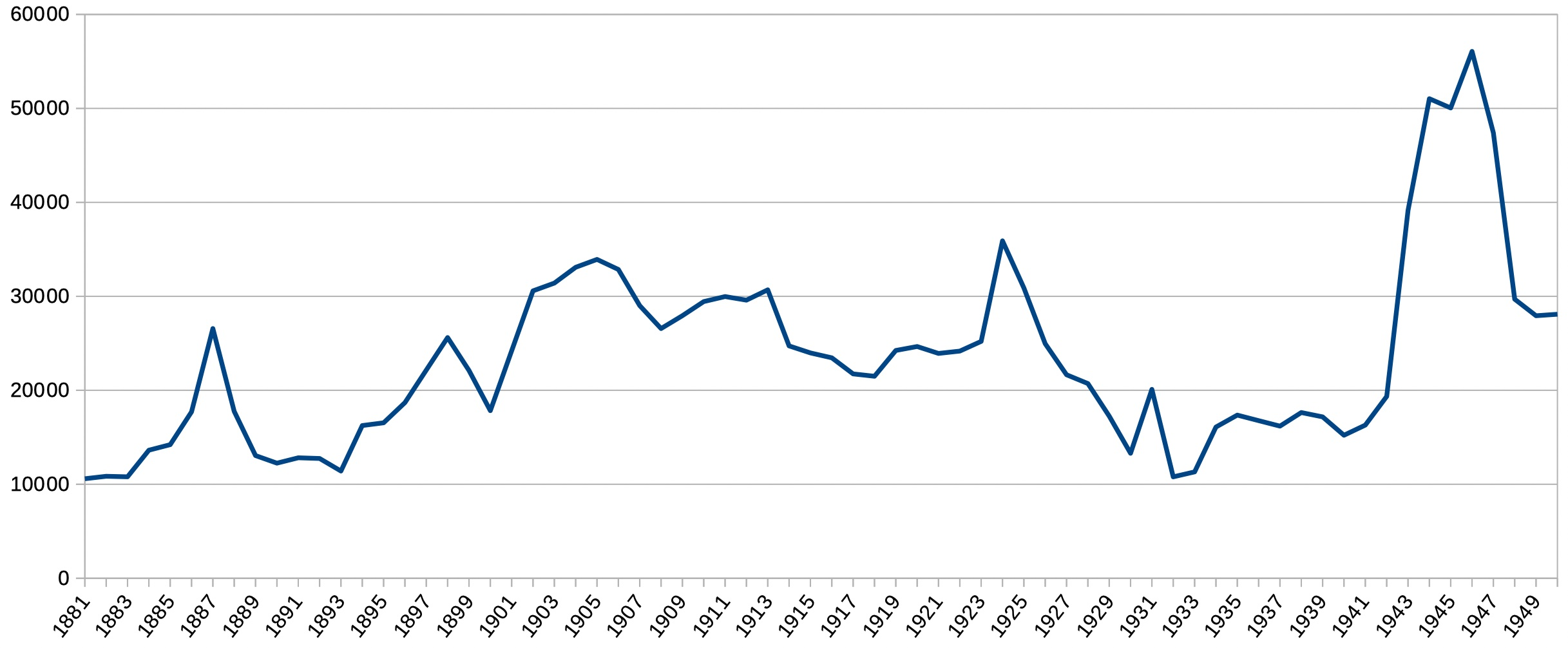
Westport passengers 1881–1950 (numbers surged in 1943 when the line fully opened)

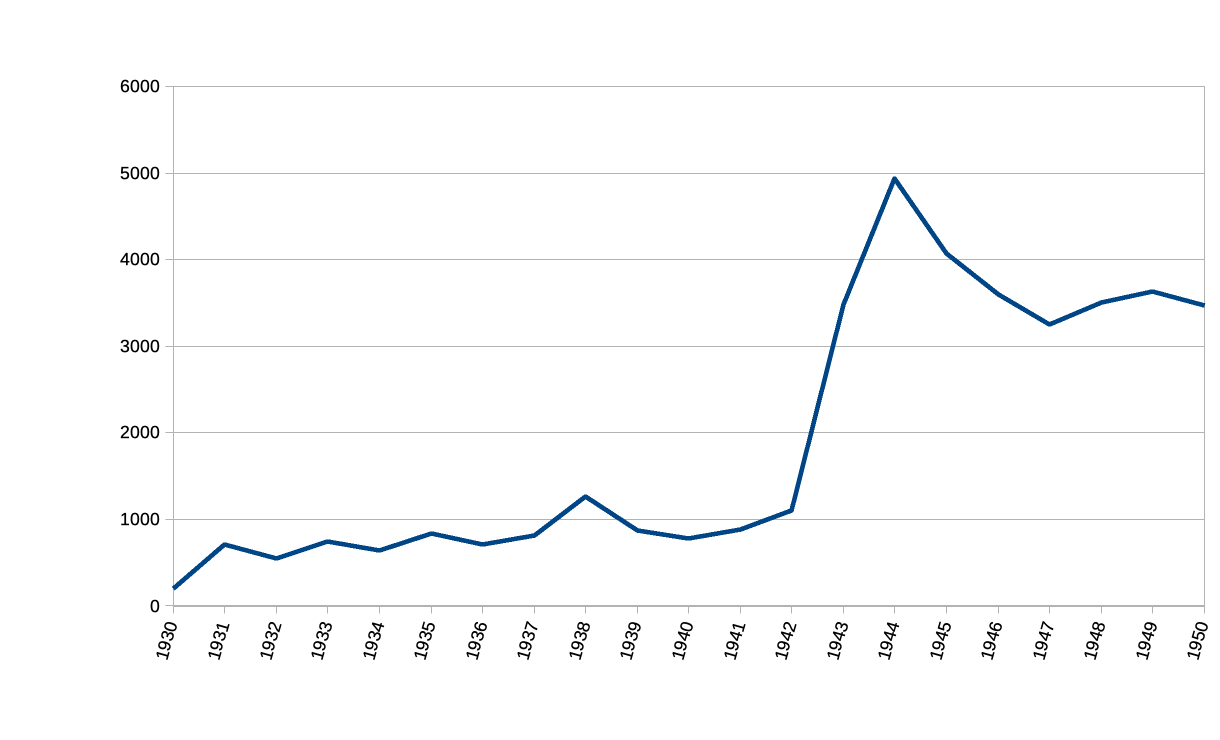
Inangahua passengers 1930-1950

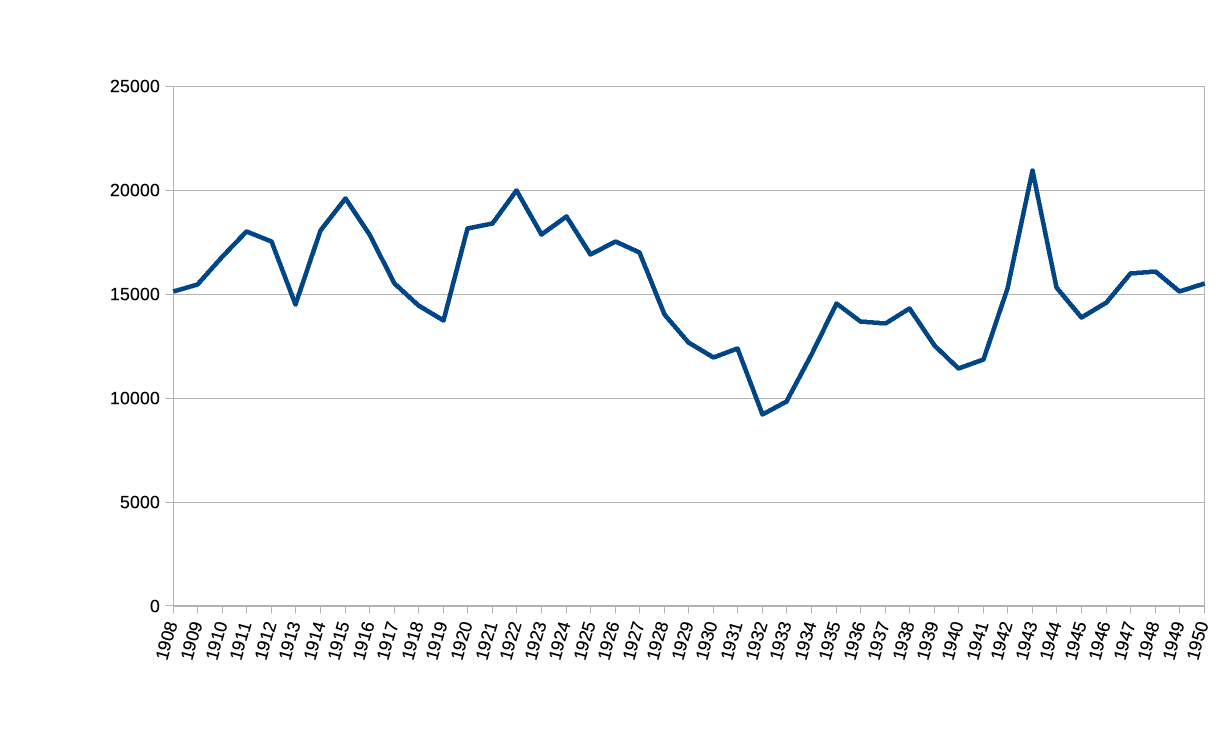
Reefton passengers 1908-1950

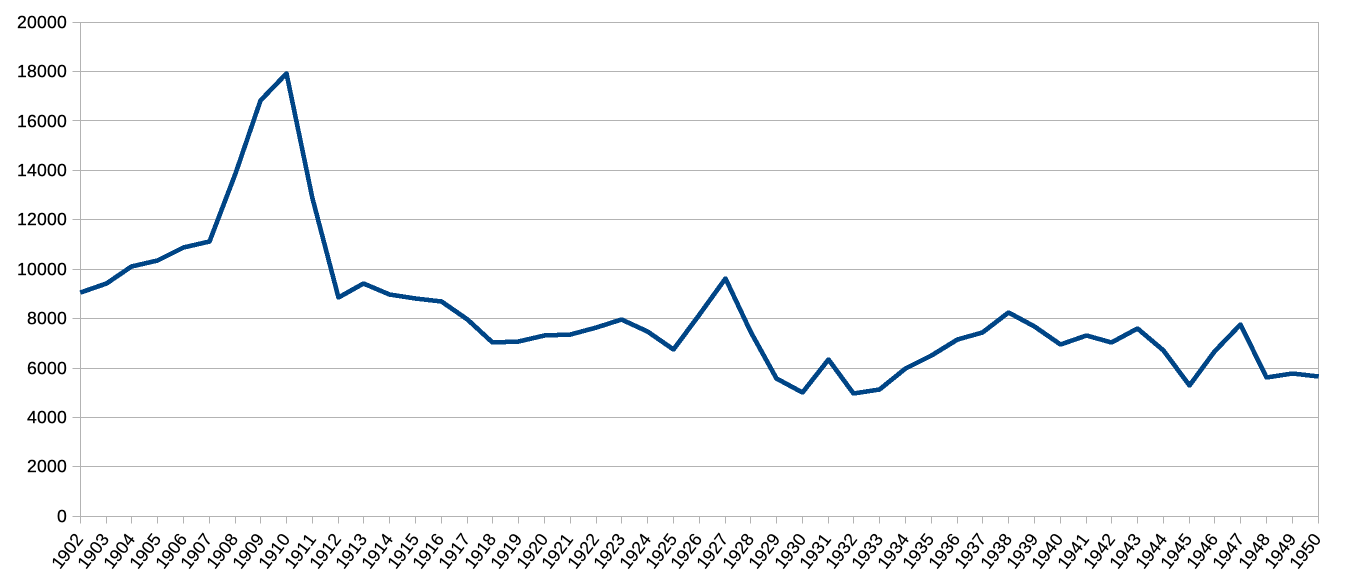
Ngahere passengers 1902-1950 (the 1910 peak is partly due to the opening of the Blackball branch, which was shown in separate figures from 1911)

year	Ngahere	Reefton	Inangahua	Westport	Source	Title
1881				10589	https://paperspast.natlib.govt.nz/parliamentary/appendix-to-the-journals-of-the-house-of-representatives/1881/I/967	RETURN No. 9. Statement of Revenue and Expenditure of each Station for the Year ending 31 March 1881
1882				10849	https://paperspast.natlib.govt.nz/parliamentary/appendix-to-the-journals-of-the-house-of-representatives/1882/I/825	RETURN No. 10. Statement of Revenue and Expenditure of each Station for the Year ending 31 March 1882
1883				10797	https://paperspast.natlib.govt.nz/parliamentary/appendix-to-the-journals-of-the-house-of-representatives/1883/I/897	RETURN No. 10. STATEMENT of Revenue and Expenditure of each Station for the Year ended 31 March 1883
1884				13624	https://paperspast.natlib.govt.nz/parliamentary/appendix-to-the-journals-of-the-house-of-representatives/1884/I/845	RETURN No. 10. STATEMENT of Revenue and Expenditure of each Station for the Twelve Months ending 31 March 1884
1885				14217	https://paperspast.natlib.govt.nz/parliamentary/appendix-to-the-journals-of-the-house-of-representatives/1885/I/1157?large_image=true	RETURN No. 10. STATEMENT of Revenue and Expenditure of each Station for the Twelve Months ending 31 March 1885
1886				17706	https://paperspast.natlib.govt.nz/parliamentary/appendix-to-the-journals-of-the-house-of-representatives/1886/I/1139?large_image=true	RETURN No. 10. STATEMENT of Revenue and Expenditure of each Station for the Twelve Months ending 31 March 1886
1887				26569	https://paperspast.natlib.govt.nz/parliamentary/appendix-to-the-journals-of-the-house-of-representatives/1887/I/921?large_image=true	RETURN No. 10. STATEMENT of Revenue and Expenditure of each Station for the Twelve Months ending 31 March 1887
1888				17762	https://paperspast.natlib.govt.nz/parliamentary/appendix-to-the-journals-of-the-house-of-representatives/1888/I/1011?large_image=true	RETURN No. 10. STATEMENT of Revenue and Expenditure of each Station for the Twelve Months ending 31 March 1888
1889				13057	https://paperspast.natlib.govt.nz/parliamentary/appendix-to-the-journals-of-the-house-of-representatives/1889/I/1070?large_image=true	RETURN No. 10. STATEMENT of Revenue and Expenditure of each Station for the Twelve Months ending 31 March 1889
1890				12249	https://paperspast.natlib.govt.nz/parliamentary/appendix-to-the-journals-of-the-house-of-representatives/1890/I/1066?large_image=true	RETURN No. 10. STATEMENT of Revenue and Expenditure of each Station for the Twelve Months ending 31 March 1890
1891				12818	https://paperspast.natlib.govt.nz/parliamentary/appendix-to-the-journals-of-the-house-of-representatives/1891/II/1266?large_image=true	RETURN No. 10. STATEMENT of Revenue and Expenditure of each Station for the Twelve Months ending 31 March 1891
1892				12748	https://paperspast.natlib.govt.nz/parliamentary/appendix-to-the-journals-of-the-house-of-representatives/1892/I/1166?large_image=true	RETURN No. 10. STATEMENT of Revenue and Expenditure of each Station for the Twelve Months ending 31 March 1892
1893				11408	https://paperspast.natlib.govt.nz/parliamentary/appendix-to-the-journals-of-the-house-of-representatives/1893/I/1496?large_image=true	RETURN No. 10. STATEMENT of Revenue and Expenditure of each Station for the Twelve Months ending 31 March 1893
1894				16252	https://paperspast.natlib.govt.nz/parliamentary/appendix-to-the-journals-of-the-house-of-representatives/1894/I/1390?large_image=true	RETURN No. 10. STATEMENT of Revenue and Expenditure of each Station for the Twelve Months ending 31 March 1894
1895				16543	https://paperspast.natlib.govt.nz/parliamentary/appendix-to-the-journals-of-the-house-of-representatives/1895/I/1588?large_image=true	RETURN No. 10. STATEMENT of Revenue and Expenditure of each Station for the Twelve Months ending 31 March 1895
1896				18690	https://paperspast.natlib.govt.nz/parliamentary/appendix-to-the-journals-of-the-house-of-representatives/1896/I/1627?large_image=true	RETURN No. 10. STATEMENT of Revenue and Expenditure of each Station for the Twelve Months ending 31 March 1896
1898				25612	https://paperspast.natlib.govt.nz/parliamentary/appendix-to-the-journals-of-the-house-of-representatives/1898/I/1672?large_image=true	RETURN No. 12. STATEMENT of Revenue and Expenditure of each Station for the Year ended 31 March 1898
1899				22108	https://paperspast.natlib.govt.nz/parliamentary/appendix-to-the-journals-of-the-house-of-representatives/1899/I/1826?large_image=true	RETURN No. 12. STATEMENT of Revenue and Expenditure of each Station for the Year ended 31 March 1899
1900				17834	https://paperspast.natlib.govt.nz/parliamentary/appendix-to-the-journals-of-the-house-of-representatives/1900/I/1614?large_image=true	RETURN No. 12. STATEMENT of Revenue and Expenditure of each Station for the Year ended 31 March 1900
1902	9044			30584	https://paperspast.natlib.govt.nz/parliamentary/appendix-to-the-journals-of-the-house-of-representatives/1902/I/1437?large_image=true	RETURN No. 12. STATEMENT of Revenue and Expenditure of each Station for the Year ended 31 March 1902
1903	9412			31410	https://paperspast.natlib.govt.nz/parliamentary/appendix-to-the-journals-of-the-house-of-representatives/1903/I/1874?large_image=true	RETURN No. 12. STATEMENT of Revenue and Expenditure of each Station for the Year ended 31 March 1903
1904	10119			33090	https://paperspast.natlib.govt.nz/parliamentary/appendix-to-the-journals-of-the-house-of-representatives/1904/I/1849?large_image=true	RETURN No. 12. STATEMENT of Revenue and Expenditure of each Station for the Year ended 31 March 1904
1905	10344			33928	https://paperspast.natlib.govt.nz/parliamentary/appendix-to-the-journals-of-the-house-of-representatives/1905/I/3768?large_image=true	RETURN No. 12. STATEMENT of Revenue and Expenditure of each Station for the Year ended 31 March 1905
1906	10871			32859	https://paperspast.natlib.govt.nz/parliamentary/appendix-to-the-journals-of-the-house-of-representatives/1906/II/1602?large_image=true	RETURN No. 12. STATEMENT of Revenue and Expenditure of each Station for the Year ended 31 March 1906
1907	11138			29012	https://paperspast.natlib.govt.nz/parliamentary/appendix-to-the-journals-of-the-house-of-representatives/1907/I/2544?large_image=true	RETURN No. 12. STATEMENT of Revenue and Expenditure of each Station for the Year ended 31 March 1907
1908	13868	15128		26567	https://paperspast.natlib.govt.nz/parliamentary/appendix-to-the-journals-of-the-house-of-representatives/1908/I/2064?large_image=true	RETURN No. 12. STATEMENT of Revenue and Expenditure of each Station for the Year ended 31 March 1908
1909	16841	15458		27944	https://paperspast.natlib.govt.nz/parliamentary/appendix-to-the-journals-of-the-house-of-representatives/1909/II/1835?large_image=true	RETURN No. 12. STATEMENT of Revenue and Expenditure of each Station for the Year ended 31 March 1909
1910	17930	16821		29440	https://paperspast.natlib.govt.nz/parliamentary/appendix-to-the-journals-of-the-house-of-representatives/1910/I/2053?large_image=true	RETURN No. 12. STATEMENT of Revenue and Expenditure of each Station for the Year ended 31 March 1910
1911	12869	18033		29976	https://paperspast.natlib.govt.nz/parliamentary/appendix-to-the-journals-of-the-house-of-representatives/1911/I/2500?large_image=true	RETURN No. 12. STATEMENT of Revenue and Expenditure of each Station for the Year ended 31 March 1911
1912	8847	17546		29593	https://paperspast.natlib.govt.nz/parliamentary/appendix-to-the-journals-of-the-house-of-representatives/1912/II/2423?large_image=true	RETURN No. 12. STATEMENT of Revenue and Expenditure of each Station for the Year ended 31 March 1912
1913	9442	14503		30690	https://paperspast.natlib.govt.nz/parliamentary/appendix-to-the-journals-of-the-house-of-representatives/1913/I/3696?large_image=true	RETURN No. 12. STATEMENT of Revenue and Expenditure of each Station for the Year ended 31 March 1913
1914	8983	18094		24725	https://paperspast.natlib.govt.nz/parliamentary/appendix-to-the-journals-of-the-house-of-representatives/1914/I/2033?large_image=true	RETURN No. 12. Statement of Revenue for each Station for the Year ended 31 March 1914
1915	8797	19627		23977	https://paperspast.natlib.govt.nz/parliamentary/appendix-to-the-journals-of-the-house-of-representatives/1915/I/1641?large_image=true	RETURN No. 12. Statement of Revenue for each Station for the Year ended 31 March 1915
1916	8712	17882		23454	https://paperspast.natlib.govt.nz/parliamentary/appendix-to-the-journals-of-the-house-of-representatives/1916/I/1056?large_image=true	RETURN No. 12. Statement of Revenue for each Station for the Year ended 31 March 1916
1917	7978	15515		21744	https://paperspast.natlib.govt.nz/parliamentary/appendix-to-the-journals-of-the-house-of-representatives/1917/I/1126?large_image=true	RETURN No. 12. Statement of Revenue for each Station for the Year ended 31 March 1917
1918	7023	14455		21494	https://paperspast.natlib.govt.nz/parliamentary/appendix-to-the-journals-of-the-house-of-representatives/1918/I-II/1162?large_image=true	RETURN No. 12. Statement of Revenue for each Station for the Year ended 31 March 1918
1919	7063	13755		24241	https://paperspast.natlib.govt.nz/parliamentary/appendix-to-the-journals-of-the-house-of-representatives/1919/I/1234?large_image=true	RETURN No. 12. Statement of Revenue for each Station for the Year ended 31 March 1919
1920	7332	18161		24656	https://paperspast.natlib.govt.nz/parliamentary/appendix-to-the-journals-of-the-house-of-representatives/1920/I/1352?large_image=true	RETURN No. 12. Statement of Revenue for each Station for the Year ended 31 March 1920
1921	7361	18434		23925	https://paperspast.natlib.govt.nz/parliamentary/appendix-to-the-journals-of-the-house-of-representatives/1921/I-II/1455?large_image=true	RETURN No. 12. Statement of Revenue for each Station for the Year ended 31 March 1921
1922	7623	19990		24169	https://paperspast.natlib.govt.nz/parliamentary/appendix-to-the-journals-of-the-house-of-representatives/1922/I/1412?large_image=true	RETURN No. 12. Statement of Revenue for each Station for the Year ended 31 March 1922
1923	7960	17884		25205	https://paperspast.natlib.govt.nz/parliamentary/appendix-to-the-journals-of-the-house-of-representatives/1923/I-II/1324?large_image=true	RETURN No. 12. Statement of Revenue for each Station for the Year ended 31 March 1923
1924	7498	18740		35907	https://paperspast.natlib.govt.nz/parliamentary/appendix-to-the-journals-of-the-house-of-representatives/1924/I/2461?large_image=true	RETURN No. 12. Statement of Revenue for each Station for the Year ended 31 March 1924
1925	6768	16902		30890	https://paperspast.natlib.govt.nz/parliamentary/appendix-to-the-journals-of-the-house-of-representatives/1925/I/1806?large_image=true	RETURN No. 12. Statement of Traffic and Revenue for each Station for the Year ended 31 March 1925
1926	8148	17564		24954	https://paperspast.natlib.govt.nz/parliamentary/appendix-to-the-journals-of-the-house-of-representatives/1926/I/1932?large_image=true	STATEMENT No. 18 Statement of Traffic and Revenue for each Station for the Year ended 31 March 1926
1927	9624	17017		21650	https://paperspast.natlib.govt.nz/parliamentary/appendix-to-the-journals-of-the-house-of-representatives/1927/I/2232?large_image=true	STATEMENT No. 18 Statement of Traffic and Revenue for each Station for the Year ended 31 March 1927
1928	7481	14016		20719	https://paperspast.natlib.govt.nz/parliamentary/appendix-to-the-journals-of-the-house-of-representatives/1928/I/2630?large_image=true	STATEMENT No. 18 Statement of Traffic and Revenue for each Station for the Year ended 31 March 1928
1929	5569	12695		17252	https://paperspast.natlib.govt.nz/parliamentary/appendix-to-the-journals-of-the-house-of-representatives/1929/I/2092?large_image=true	STATEMENT No. 18 Statement of Traffic and Revenue for each Station for the Year ended 31 March 1929
1930	5008	11984	200	13301	https://paperspast.natlib.govt.nz/parliamentary/appendix-to-the-journals-of-the-house-of-representatives/1930/I/2214?large_image=true	STATEMENT No. 18 Statement of Traffic and Revenue for each Station for the Year ended 31 March 1930
1931	6357	12380	705	20099	https://paperspast.natlib.govt.nz/parliamentary/appendix-to-the-journals-of-the-house-of-representatives/1931/I-II/1780?large_image=true	STATEMENT No. 18 Statement of Traffic and Revenue for each Station for the Year ended 31 March 1931
1932	4963	9198	551	10794	https://paperspast.natlib.govt.nz/parliamentary/appendix-to-the-journals-of-the-house-of-representatives/1932/I-II/1936?large_image=true	STATEMENT No. 18 Statement of Traffic and Revenue for each Station for the Year ended 31 March 1932
1933	5112	9826	745	11319	https://paperspast.natlib.govt.nz/parliamentary/appendix-to-the-journals-of-the-house-of-representatives/1933/I/1390?large_image=true	STATEMENT No. 18 Statement of Traffic and Revenue for each Station for the Year ended 31 March 1933
1934	5993	12122	638	16093	https://paperspast.natlib.govt.nz/parliamentary/appendix-to-the-journals-of-the-house-of-representatives/1934/I/2280?large_image=true	STATEMENT No. 18 Statement of Traffic and Revenue for each Station for the Year ended 31 March 1934
1935	6519	14564	837	17360	https://paperspast.natlib.govt.nz/parliamentary/appendix-to-the-journals-of-the-house-of-representatives/1935/I/1328?large_image=true	STATEMENT No. 18 Statement of Traffic and Revenue for each Station for the Year ended 31 March 1935
1936	7150	13673	712	16774	https://paperspast.natlib.govt.nz/parliamentary/AJHR1936-I.2.2.3.4/2	STATEMENT No. 18 Statement of Traffic and Revenue for each Station for the Year ended 31 March 1936
1937	7447	13600	817	16189	https://paperspast.natlib.govt.nz/parliamentary/appendix-to-the-journals-of-the-house-of-representatives/1937/I/1898?large_image=true	STATEMENT No. 18 Statement of Traffic and Revenue for each Station for the Year ended 31 March 1937
1938	8256	14315	1270	17636	https://paperspast.natlib.govt.nz/parliamentary/appendix-to-the-journals-of-the-house-of-representatives/1938/I/1654?large_image=true	STATEMENT No. 18 Statement of Traffic and Revenue for each Station for the Year ended 31 March 1938
1939	7690	12516	874	17174	https://paperspast.natlib.govt.nz/parliamentary/appendix-to-the-journals-of-the-house-of-representatives/1939/I/1972?large_image=true	STATEMENT No. 18 Statement of Traffic and Revenue for each Station for the Year ended 31 March 1939
1940	6960	11452	775	15218	https://paperspast.natlib.govt.nz/parliamentary/appendix-to-the-journals-of-the-house-of-representatives/1940/I/1316?large_image=true	STATEMENT No. 18 Statement of Traffic and Revenue for each Station for the Year ended 31 March 1940
1941	7322	11849	883	16299	https://paperspast.natlib.govt.nz/parliamentary/appendix-to-the-journals-of-the-house-of-representatives/1941/I/1205?large_image=true	STATEMENT No. 18 Statement of Traffic and Revenue for each Station for the Year ended 31 March 1941
1942	7021	15265	1101	19347	https://paperspast.natlib.govt.nz/parliamentary/appendix-to-the-journals-of-the-house-of-representatives/1942/I/653?large_image=true	STATEMENT No. 18 Statement of Traffic and Revenue for each Station for the Year ended 31 March 1942
1943	7620	20961	3481	39150	https://paperspast.natlib.govt.nz/parliamentary/appendix-to-the-journals-of-the-house-of-representatives/1943/I/681?large_image=true	STATEMENT No. 18 Statement of Traffic and Revenue for each Station for the Year ended 31 March 1943
1944	6715	15315	4934	51033	https://paperspast.natlib.govt.nz/parliamentary/appendix-to-the-journals-of-the-house-of-representatives/1944/I/897?large_image=true	STATEMENT No. 18 Statement of Traffic and Revenue for each Station for the Year ended 31 March 1944
1945	5292	13874	4077	50047	https://paperspast.natlib.govt.nz/parliamentary/appendix-to-the-journals-of-the-house-of-representatives/1945/I/971?large_image=true	STATEMENT No. 18 Statement of Traffic and Revenue for each Station for the Year ended 31 March 1945
1946	6686	14624	3597	56064	https://paperspast.natlib.govt.nz/parliamentary/appendix-to-the-journals-of-the-house-of-representatives/1946/I/1550?large_image=true	STATEMENT No. 18 Statement of Traffic and Revenue for each Station for the Year ended 31 March 1946
1947	7766	16022	3253	47403	https://paperspast.natlib.govt.nz/parliamentary/appendix-to-the-journals-of-the-house-of-representatives/1947/I/2497?large_image=true	STATEMENT No. 18 Statement of Traffic and Revenue for each Station for the Year ended 31 March 1947
1948	5636	16094	3508	29694	https://paperspast.natlib.govt.nz/parliamentary/appendix-to-the-journals-of-the-house-of-representatives/1948/I/2523?large_image=true	STATEMENT No. 18 Statement of Traffic and Revenue for each Station for the Year ended 31 March 1948
1949	5790	15138	3630	27935	https://paperspast.natlib.govt.nz/parliamentary/appendix-to-the-journals-of-the-house-of-representatives/1949/I/2106?large_image=true	STATEMENT No. 18 Statement of Traffic and Revenue for each Station for the Year ended 31 March 1949
1950	5644	15530	3469	28094	https://paperspast.natlib.govt.nz/parliamentary/appendix-to-the-journals-of-the-house-of-representatives/1950/I/2368?large_image=true	STATEMENT No. 18 Statement of Traffic and Revenue for each Station for the Year ended 31 March 1950

== Construction camps ==
Over 400 men worked on construction in the 1920s and 30s, when Tiroroa had the largest of 9 PWD construction camps. Until the camps were set up, trains brought workers from Westport. As construction progressed, new camps were set up to the east. Access from the main road and camps was by a cableway for materials, 3 ferries on cables for workmen and a suspension bridge. A protest meeting was held in Westport when work was stopped in 1931. Some buildings were then removed and the YMCA hall advertised for sale.

=== Little Ohika ===
Ohika camp was started in 1927. 64 were at work by May 1928. The camp, beside the main road at Ohika, had 5 married men's cottages, 47 single huts, a cookhouse and a bathhouse.

=== Tiroroa ===
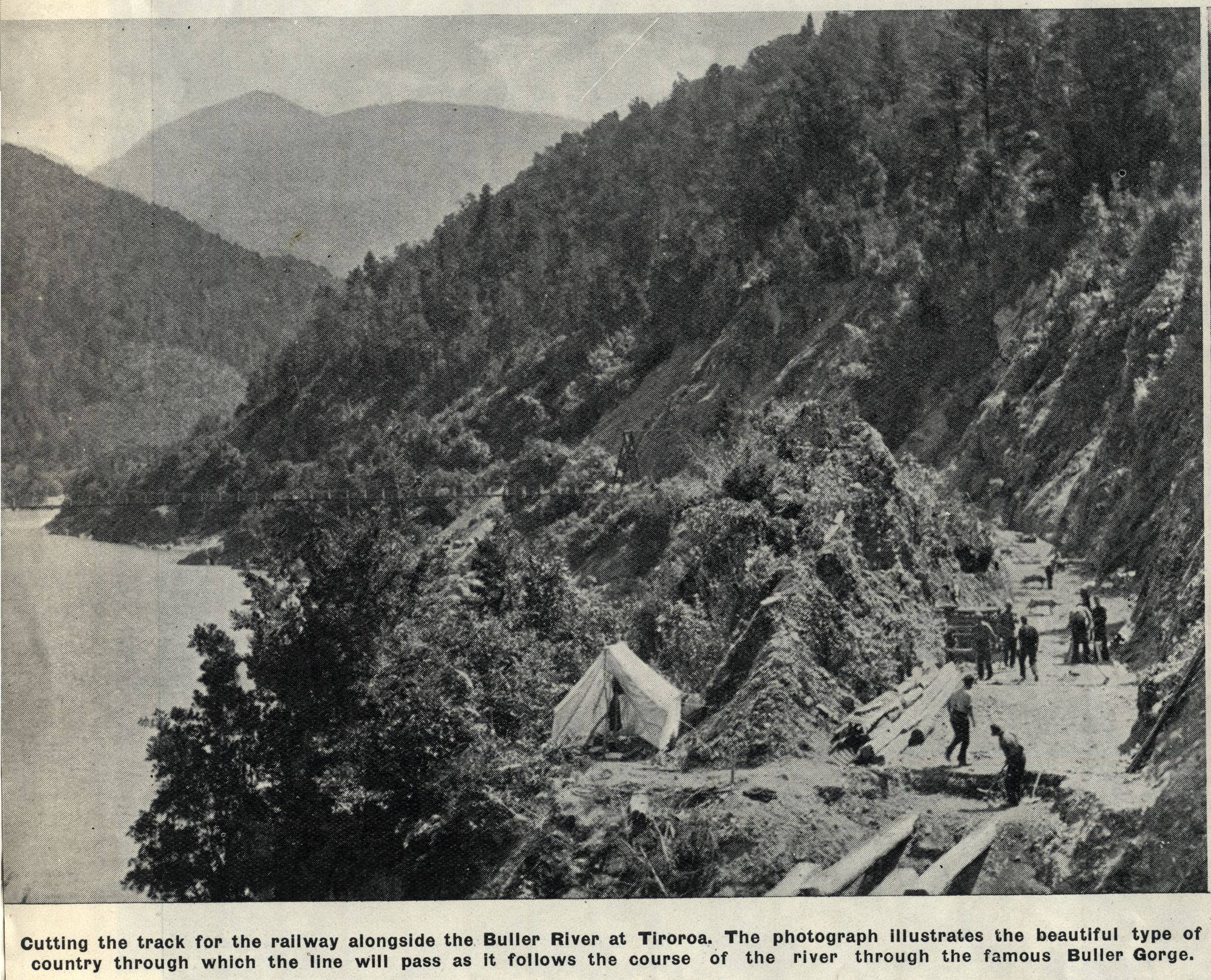
Construction at Tiroroa

Tiroroa camp was started in 1926, either side of the main road (married huts up the hill and single huts towards the river) 14 mi (23 km) from Westport. It had a YMCA recreation hall (opened about 1928), bath houses, a tennis court, 9 married men's cottages, 63 single huts, a school for 30 children and an office. A workshop, stores and engine shop were beside the road. Part of the camp was flooded in 1936. Electricity came in 1938. Buildings from the camp (and Tunnel and Blackwater camps) were finally put up for sale in 1941, when only the bridges were unfinished. The site is now again covered in bush.

Twelve Mile Hotel burnt down on 14 August 1958. It was a single storey building, near the centre of the camp, which had been at Tiroroa since at least 1869.

=== Hawk's Crag ===
Highway Camp, also known as Petticoat Lane, south of Hawks Crag, had 3 houses and 10 huts for road construction workers.

=== Tunnel Camp ===
Tunnel Camp, north of Hawk's Crag, had housing for 3 married men and 20 single men. Access to the work across the river was by suspension bridge, or later by boat.

=== Blackwater ===
Blackwater Camp had an overseer’s house and 12 huts on the Newmans stables site, east of Hawk's Crag.

=== Berlins ===
Berlins Camp had 2 houses and 14 huts. Access to work was by boat.

John Berlin had a hotel by at least 1875, which still bears his name. Two nearby coal mines were worked from about 1901 to about 1963.

=== Burley ===
Burley Camp was set up in 1928, near the coal mine, 7 mi (11 km) from Inangahua, between Berlins and Melrose. Burley’s Hill Camp housed single men, with a cookhouse run by a married couple. Access between the camp, 19 mi (31 km) from Westport, and the work around Rahui was by a 540 ft (160 m), or 520 ft (160 m) pedestrian suspension bridge, built in 1930. By 1911 there was also a 725 ft (221 m) suspension bridge over the river, just downstream from Buller. It's sometimes not clear in accounts which bridge is being described.

=== Inangahua ===
Inangahua had the second largest camp. A YMCA hut and electricity came in 1938.
