= Māwhera =

The Māori language name Māwhera may refer to

- Greymouth, a town in New Zealand
- Grey River / Māwheranui, the river which reaches the sea at Greymouth
- Little Grey River / Māwheraiti, a tributary of the Māwheranui
