= Te Kuha =

- Interactive map of Te Kuha
- Coordinates: 41°49′33″S 171°39′16″E
- Country: New Zealand
- Region: West Coast
- District: Buller District
- Electorates: West Coast-Tasman; Te Tai Tonga

Population (2023)
  - Total: 168

Te Kuha is a small village east of Westport in the Buller District of the West Coast region of New Zealand's South Island. Located at the western end of the Lower Buller Gorge, the Buller River flows through the village.

It was the site of a punt connecting Westport to the south bank before the "black bridge" was constructed at Westport. State Highway 6 runs on the southern bank of the river, and the Stillwater - Westport Line railway runs on the northern bank. The railway line opened to Te Kuha from Westport in 1912, but a connection through the Buller Gorge to Inangahua Junction was not completed until 1942. Passenger services no longer pass through Te Kuha; the railway mainly transports coal to the east coast port of Lyttelton.

As of 2023, there is little remaining evidence of the village at Te Kuha. The road ends as the railway enters the Buller Gorge, and the surrounding flats are used for farming. There are no building remains, and access on the railway side of the Buller River is discouraged due to railway activity. Although this point was the early punt crossing for the road on the south bank at Windy Point, the construction of the 'black bridge' across the Buller marked the decline of Te Kuha. The railway was, however, opened as far as Cascade Creek, where coal bins stored coal flumed from the Cascade Mine for loading into trains for shipment at Westport. During World War II, the government completed the Buller Gorge Railway in 1942, finally connecting the isolated 'Westport section' to the rest of the South Island railway system.

Te Kuha was classified as a "limited employment locality" in 2004, leading the government to cancel benefits for unemployed individuals who moved to the area.

== Demographics ==
Te Kuha locality covers 40.09 km^{2} (15.48 sq mi). It is part of the larger Westport Rural statistical area.

Historical population
Year	Pop.	±% p.a.
2006	147	—
2013	147	+0.00%
2018	165	+2.34%
2023	168	+0.36%

Te Kuha had a population of 168 in the 2023 New Zealand census, an increase of 3 people (1.8%) since the 2018 census, and an increase of 21 people (14.3%) since the 2013 census. There were 81 males and 90 females in 42 dwellings. 3.6% of people identified as LGBTIQ+. The median age was 61.0 years (compared with 38.1 years nationally). There were 24 people (14.3%) aged under 15 years, 18 (10.7%) aged 15 to 29, 51 (30.4%) aged 30 to 64, and 75 (44.6%) aged 65 or older.

People could identify as more than one ethnicity. The results were 92.9% European (Pākehā), 8.9% Māori, 1.8% Asian, and 3.6% other, which includes people giving their ethnicity as "New Zealander". English was spoken by 100.0%, Māori by 1.8%, and other languages by 1.8%. The percentage of people born overseas was 7.1, compared with 28.8% nationally.

Religious affiliations were 50.0% Christian and 1.8% New Age. People who answered that they had no religion were 39.3%, and 7.1% of people did not answer the census question.

Of those at least 15 years old, 18 (12.5%) people had a bachelor's or higher degree, 75 (52.1%) had a post-high school certificate or diploma, and 60 (41.7%) people exclusively held high school qualifications. The median income was $29,200, compared with $41,500 nationally. 6 people (4.2%) earned over $100,000 compared to 12.1% nationally. The employment status of those at least 15 was 45 (31.2%) full-time, 15 (10.4%) part-time, and 3 (2.1%) unemployed.
