= 1968 Inangahua earthquake =

Earthquake in New Zealand

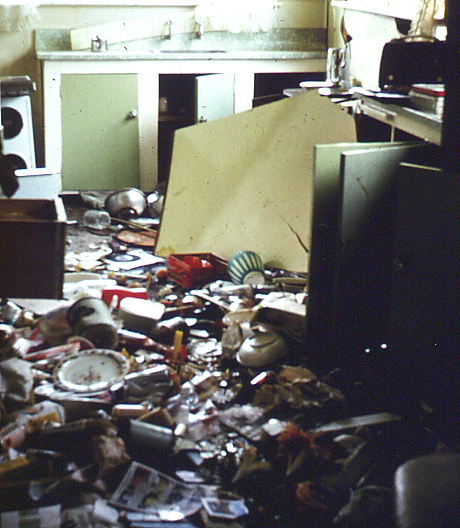
- Damage inside Inangahua house after the earthquake

- Location within New Zealand
- UTC time: 1968-05-23 17:24:18
- ISC event: 822588
- USGS-ANSS: ComCat
- Local date: 24 May 1968
- Local time: 5:24 am NZST (UTC+12)
- Magnitude: 7.1 M_{w}
- Depth: 12 km (7.5 mi)
- Epicentre: 41.76°S 172.04°E
- Areas affected: New Zealand
- Max. intensity: MMI X (Extreme)
- Peak acceleration: ~0.6 g
- Casualties: 3 dead, 14 injured

The 1968 Inangahua earthquake struck 25 kilometres (16 mi) west of Murchison, New Zealand, near the small town of Inangahua Junction at 5:24 am NZDT on 24 May 1968. The earthquake had a moment magnitude of 7.1, a local magnitude of 6.7, a surface-wave magnitude of 7.4 and a maximum Mercalli intensity of X (Extreme). It occurred at a depth of 12 kilometres (7.5 mi), being extremely shallow for an earthquake of its size. It resulted in the deaths of three people, with a further 14 people injured, making it the fifth deadliest earthquake in New Zealand's recorded history (tied with the 1848 Marlborough earthquake). Numerous aftershocks followed the quake, including 15 that were magnitude 5 or greater and occurred within a month.

== Tectonic setting ==
New Zealand lies along the boundary between the Indo-Australian and Pacific plates. In the South Island most of the relative displacement between these plates is taken up along a single dextral (right lateral) strike-slip fault with a major reverse component, the Alpine Fault. The 1968 Inangahua earthquake occurred along the Northern section of the Alpine Fault, and was considered quite average for what the fault can produce.

== Damage ==
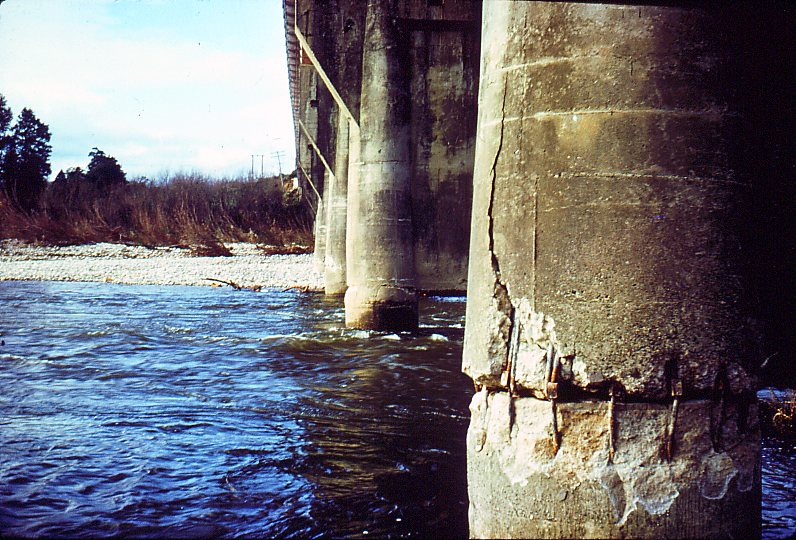
Inangahua Junction bridge after the 1968 earthquake.

The earthquake ruined many years of expensive work improving State Highway 6 in the Inangahua and Buller Gorge areas. In a section of 50 kilometres (31 mi), the road through Buller Gorge was blocked in more than 50 places, either buried under landslides or where the road itself had collapsed into the gorge. The earthquake also damaged or destroyed more than 50 bridges. It also derailed two goods trains, and over 100 kilometres (62 mi) of damaged railway track had to be replaced.

All roads in and out of Inangahua were blocked by landslides. The electricity and phone networks were out, and many water pipes in Inangahua were damaged beyond repair.

Other West Coast towns were heavily shaken; more than two-thirds of the chimneys in Greymouth, Westport, and Reefton were damaged.

=== Casualties ===
At Whitecliffs, a limestone bluff collapsed onto a farmhouse owned by Mr Frederick John Jackson and pushed it downhill, killing Mrs Rona Mildred Jackson instantly and fatally injuring her visiting mother, Mrs Fanny Elizabeth Blackmore of Christchurch. Shortly after the earthquake, one man died near Greymouth when his car hit a subsided section of road on the run-up to a bridge. An additional three men were killed on 29 May when a Bell 47G-2A helicopter, piloted by Gordon Hutchings, carrying two Post Office linesmen, Robert Pedder and Edwin Steer, from Murchison to Lyell, hit power lines and crashed shortly after take-off.

=== Landslides ===
The earthquake and its many aftershocks triggered numerous landslides in the surrounding mountains. A huge landslide dammed the Buller River upstream of Inangahua. The rising water backed up for 7 kilometres (4.3 mi), raising the river to 30 metres above its normal level. If the landslide dam had burst, the river would have flooded not only Inangahua, but the much larger town of Westport, located downstream at the river mouth. As a precaution, about 10,000 people were evacuated. The dammed river eventually overflowed the landslide debris and gradually eroded it down, without causing serious flooding.

== Response ==
Shortly after the earthquake, a relief centre was set up in the Ministry of Works yard in Inangahua. People gathering there were concerned to hear that radio broadcasts only mentioned minor earthquake activity—the rest of New Zealand seemed unaware of what had happened to their town. The people of Inangahua remained alone in the disaster for several hours, until a driver managed to contact Gisborne on his truck radio. By noon, commercial and RNZAF Bell UH-1H helicopters were coming into the area with aid and to survey damage.

Help was also needed in isolated areas. Four people, including a constable and a doctor carrying a pack of medical supplies, walked to Inangahua Junction from Reefton. There the doctor treated most patients outdoors because aftershocks were still jolting the area. Meanwhile, one group of about 50 people started walking from Inangahua towards Reefton, a walk of roughly 7 hours. The group of 50 made it safely to Reefton. RNZAF UH-1H helicopters and commercial helicopters began flying people to Rotokohu, where they could board buses to Reefton, helicopters checked all outlying farmhouses. In all, 235 people were airlifted out of Inangahua.

== Aftermath ==
Inangahua never fully recovered. Many of the town's residents never went back to their homes, either staying in nearby towns such as Reefton, or deciding to move out of the area entirely. Damaged and collapsed buildings took months—in some cases, years—to be fully restored. The railway line was, however, fully restored, as it forms a key part of the Stillwater–Westport Line. After the earthquake, the area declined. People moved because they feared aftershocks. Employment decreased and school rolls dropped. Shops had fewer customers and more and more 'Help Wanted' signs were seen in windows. The area later experienced an economic downfall.

The quake had a strong effect on the local people. Children were upset and unsettled by the dramatic change in their lives. Many had to move to Reefton School for a period after the quake as the Inangahua School was damaged beyond repair. One school teacher reportedly got his students to draw pictures of their experience. One boy drew a broken house with rain falling on it. A caption read 'After the earthquake it rained'. Rainfall made the recovery and rescue efforts of the town much more complicated. Many families in the area were left with nothing. They were given supplies by social services such as Red Cross, and in some cases came out of it much better off than when they went in.

== See also ==
- List of earthquakes in 1968
- List of earthquakes in New Zealand
