= Big River (Southland) =

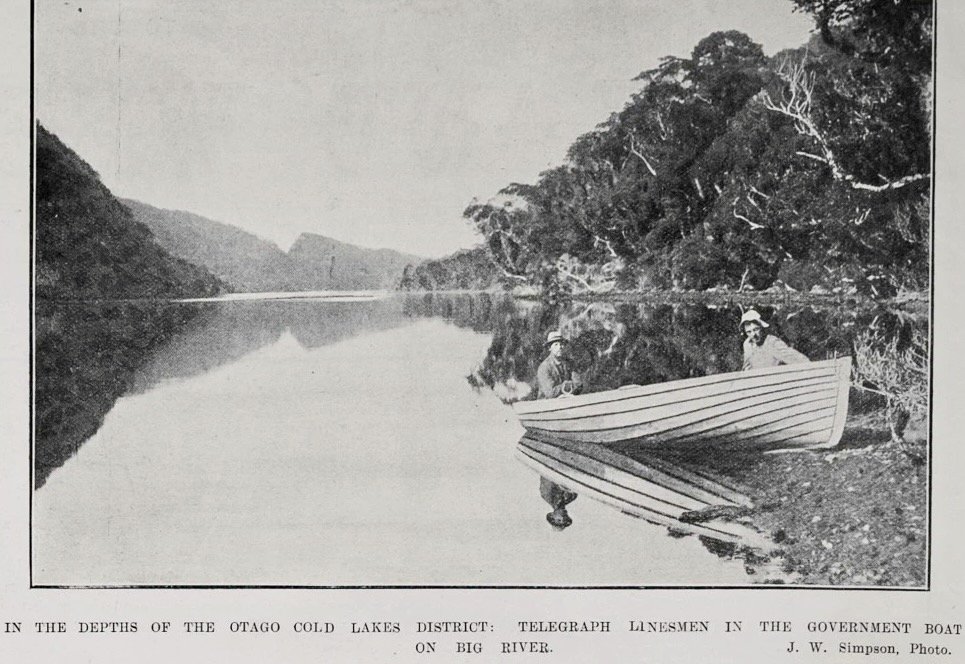
- Big River in the 1910s
- Route of the Big River
- Mouth of the Big River Big River (Southland) (South Island)
- Native name: Hakapoua

Location
- Country: New Zealand

Physical characteristics
- Source: Cameron Mountains
  - coordinates: 46°00′16″S 166°56′24″E
  - elevation: 1,304 m (4,278 ft)
- Mouth
  - location: Foveaux Strait
  - coordinates: 46°13′00″S 166°55′40″E
  - elevation: 0 m (0 ft)
- Length: 33 km (21 mi)

Basin features
- Progression: Big River → Foveaux Strait

The Big River has also been known by several other names, Windsor River and Māori names Hakapoua, Okopowa, Patu-po, or Patupō, though that last name, meaning kill by night, might refer to a place near Long Point and Waitutu. It is a river of southern Fiordland, New Zealand, and is one of four rivers of that name in the South Island. It is the main source of Lake Hakapoua and a lower stretch is the lake's 2-kilometre (1.2 mi) outflow to the sea. The river rises on the 1,123 m (3,684 ft) high Arnett Peak, in the Cameron Mountains, runs about 23 km (14 mi) to the lake. At about the midpoint of the river it runs through a narrow gorge. Elsewhere it is generally very shallow. The river is in the Fiordland National Park.

The area was used by Kāti Mamoe and later by Ngāi Tahu.

In 1903, when the area was first surveyed, whio, swan, kākāpō, weka and kākā were common. A taihoropī (grebe) has been reported on the lake. Red deer are common in the area.

== Geology ==
The river mostly flows over two rock types. Its upper reaches are mainly on undated, undifferentiated Cameron Group rocks, probably of Cambrian age. They are layers of metasedimentary and metavolcanic rocks, with quartz-rich psammite and some pelite, containing sillimanite, feldspar and migmatites.

Medium-grained, massive to weakly foliated, Devonian, Big Pluton rocks, make up the lower part of the Lake Monk (east) arm of the river and down to the sea. Big is part of the Ridge Suite of plutons, made up of biotite, muscovite, garnet, tonalite, grandiorite, granite and monzogranite.

At the southern end of Lake Hakapoua, cataclastic Balleny Basin, Eocene, Macnamara Formation, sedimentary rocks lie over Big Pluton rocks. They consist of a basal conglomerate and pebbly sandstone, covered by carbon-rich mud and sandstones. It was these rocks which slipped in 1915, filling part of the river and Lake Hakapoua, which had until then been tidal.

Like all Fiordland rivers, it has a U-shaped valley, cut by Quaternary glaciers up to 18,000 years ago.

== Tracks ==
Big River is at the end of the South Coast Track, 61 km (38 mi) from the road at Rarakau (about 28 km (17 mi)) west of Tuatapere). The track runs via Waikoau River, the former Port Craig tramway, Waitutu River and Aan River. Westies Hut, the nearest hut to Big River, is 2 km (1.2 mi) from the mouth of the river. The 5-bunk hut is a former fishing shelter, in an uplifted sea cave, which was restored in 2007.

The South Coast Track used to be part of the telegraph line and track to Puysegur Point, which was built in 1908-9, but replaced by radio in 1925, after many failures and repairs.

Routes have also been described linking Big River from the Richard Burn, or Lake Kakapo, or Lakes Poteriteri and Mouat, all via Lake Monk.

== See also ==
- List of rivers of New Zealand
