= Snowy River (New Zealand) =

Coordinates: 42°16′S 171°41′E

Location
- Country: New Zealand

Physical characteristics
- Mouth
  - location: Little Grey River
- Length: 22 km (14 mi)

The Snowy River is a river of the West Coast Region of New Zealand's South Island. It flows generally west from its sources within Victoria Forest Park, and is one of the rivers whose courses mark the edges of the Ikamatua Plain. The Snowy River joins with the Blackwater River 100 metres prior to its junction with the Māwheraiti (Little Grey) River two kilometres north of the township of Ikamatua.

== See also ==
- List of rivers of New Zealand
- Eastern Waiotauru (Snowy) River
