= Brunner, New Zealand =

Brunner
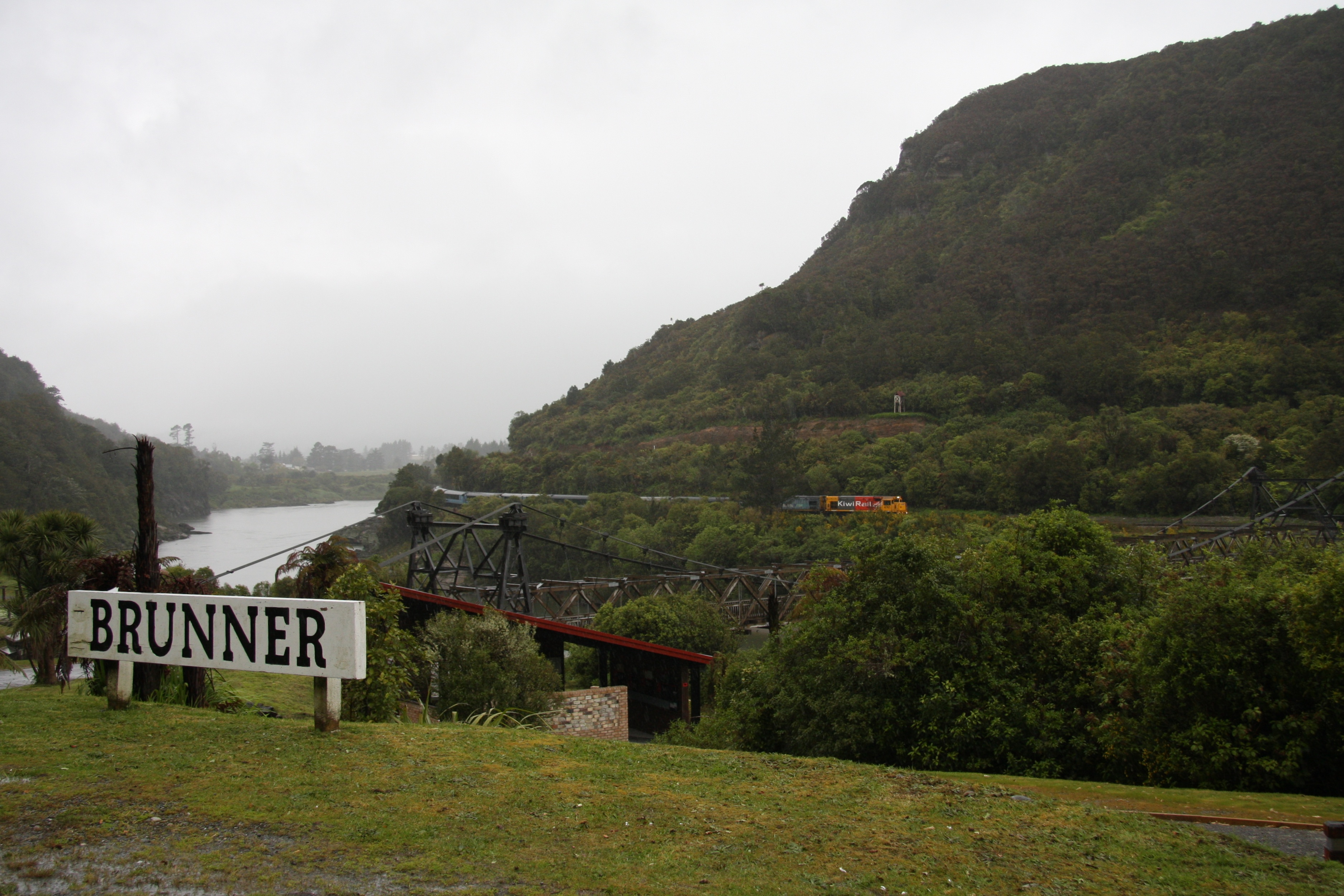
- Brunner in 2012

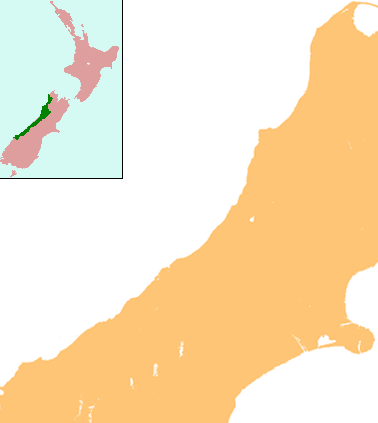
- Location within West Coast
- Coordinates: 42°25′57″S 171°19′22″E
- Country: New Zealand
- Region: West Coast
- District: Grey District
- Local iwi: Ngāi Tahu

Brunner, originally called Brunnerton, is a town in the northwest of New Zealand's South Island. It is 12 kilometres (7 mi) east of Greymouth, on the south bank of the Grey River. It is on the Midland Line railway near its junction with the Stillwater–Westport Line (SWL) in neighbouring Stillwater. Passenger trains ceased running along the SWL to Reefton and Westport in 1967, but the TranzAlpine runs the length of the Midland Line from Christchurch to Greymouth and it continues to stop in Brunner.

Historically connected with coal mining, the town was the site of a major disaster in 1896, when an explosion killed 65 miners in the Brunner Mine. Other important industries in the town have included forestry.

The population was 1,144 in the 1956 census but is very small now.

The town, formerly called Brunnerton, was named after the explorer Thomas Brunner, who discovered coal there.
