= Little Grey River =

Coordinates: 42°16′46″S 171°39′56″E

Little Grey River Māwheraiti

Location
- Country: New Zealand

Physical characteristics
- Source
  - elevation: 300 metres (980 ft)
- Mouth
  - location: Grey River / Māwheranui
  - elevation: 90 metres (300 ft)
- Length: 35 km (22 mi)

The Little Grey River, also known as the Māwheraiti, is a river of the West Coast Region of New Zealand. It is a major tributary of the Grey River / Māwheranui which it joins at Ikamatua.

The Little Grey rises in low hills above the Inangahua valley, its source being only 1 kilometre (0.62 mi) from the Inangahua River. It flows generally southwest, crossing the Maimai plain and the Ikamatua plain. Both State Highway 7 and the Stillwater–Ngākawau Line railway travel down the lower half of the river valley, crossing the river twice. The river has two large tributaries, the Blackwater River and the Snowy River, both of which flow from the east. On the left bank for the lower 5 kilometres (3.1 mi) there are extensive tailings mounds resulting from gold dredging operations in the late 19th and early 20th centuries. In 1946, both the highway and railway were temporarily closed while the dredge dug its way through to its new mining area in the Blackwater Valley. This was the first and only time that such an event has occurred in New Zealand.
