= Big River, New Zealand =

Ghost town on the West Coast, New Zealand

Coordinates: 42°14′38″S 171°53′37″E

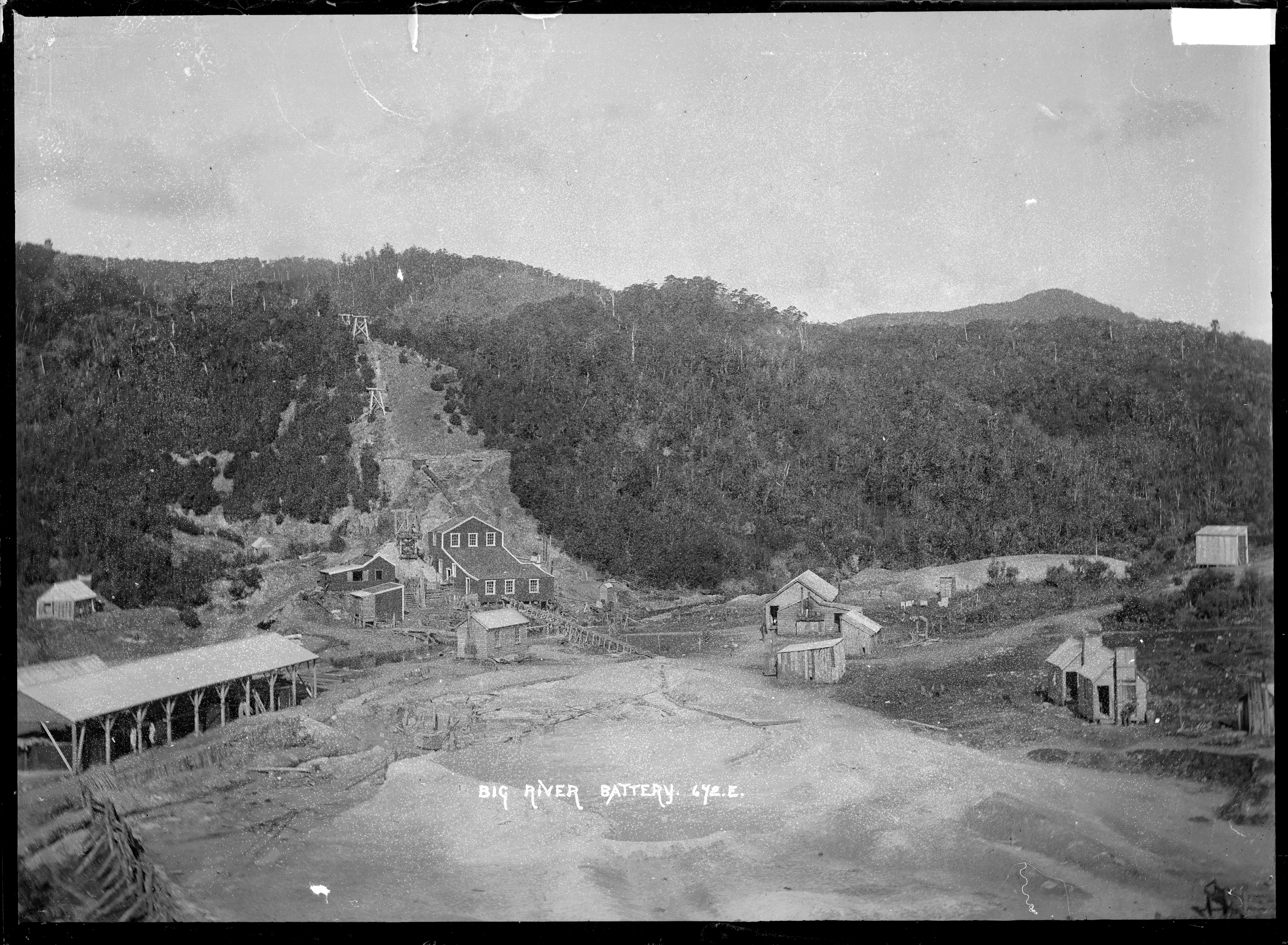
View of the Big River Battery in the 1910s

Big River is an abandoned mining town in the Buller District of New Zealand. It can he reached on foot, by mountain bike or along an old dray road by 4WD. It is located between Reefton and Waiuta on the Big River.

Demographics for the area are covered at Blacks Point.
