= Blackwater River (Little Grey River tributary) =

Coordinates: 42°15′20″S 171°41′10″E

- Mouth

Location
- Country: New Zealand

Physical characteristics
- Source
  - location: Big River
- Mouth
  - location: Māwheraiti (Little Grey) River
- Length: 11 km (6.8 mi)

The Blackwater River is located in the Buller District of New Zealand. It is the name given to the lower reaches of the Big River, from its junction with the Blackwater Creek to its outflow into the Māwheraiti (Little Grey) River. It flows generally westwards for 10 kilometres (6.2 mi) before turning southwards immediately prior to its junction with the Māwheraiti 2.5 kilometres (1.6 mi) north of the township of Ikamatua. It joins with the similar-sized Snowy River 100 metres (330 ft) before its junction with the Māwheraiti.
