= Big River (Grey) =

Coordinates: 42°10′22″S 171°31′32″E

Big River, Grey District

Location
- Country: New Zealand
- Region: West Coast
- District: Grey District

Physical characteristics
- Source
  - location: Paparoa Range
  - elevation: 1,200 metres (3,900 ft)
- Mouth
  - location: Grey River / Māwheranui
  - elevation: 50 metres (160 ft)
- Length: 25 kilometres (16 mi)

The Big River is a river in the Grey District, in the West Coast region of New Zealand's South Island. It rises on the Paparoa Range and flows south to join the Grey River / Māwheranui, about 15 kilometres (9.3 mi) below the point where the waters of Big River (Buller) enter the river.

== See also ==
- List of rivers of New Zealand
