= Big River (Buller) =

Coordinates: 42.25529°S 171.90100°E

Big River, Buller District
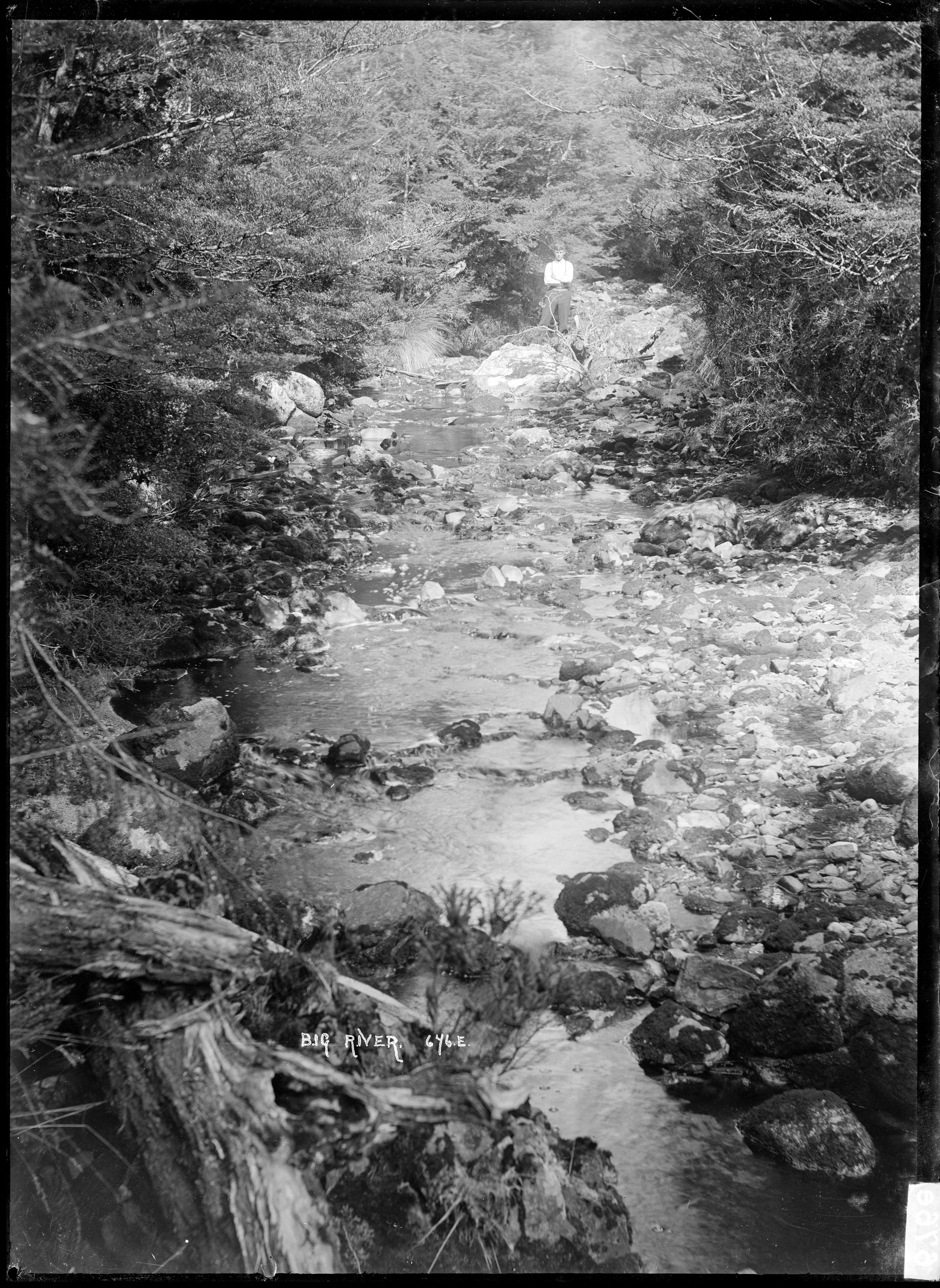
- The view at the gold mining locality, c. 1910

Location
- Country: New Zealand
- Region: West Coast
- District: Buller District

Physical characteristics
- Source
  - elevation: 800 metres (2,600 ft)
- Mouth
  - location: Blackwater River
  - elevation: 150 metres (490 ft)
- Length: 32 kilometres (20 mi)

The Big River is a river in the Buller District, in the West Coast region of New Zealand's South Island. It joins with the Blackwater Creek to form the Blackwater River. It flows west from the mountains between the Grey River / Māwheranui and the Inangahua River, just south of Victoria Forest Park. Like the river with which it shares a name, its waters enter the Grey River / Māwheranui, rather less than 20 kilometres (12 mi) upstream from those of its namesake.

Big River is the name of a former gold mine and town, beside the upper reaches of the river, much of which remains. The mine was in use from 1882 to 1927 and 1932 to 1942. From May 1888 the river had a dam above the town to provide water power for the crusher at the gold mine. It was removed between 1945 and 1972, though remnants of it exist and a Big River Dam Track runs to the dam site.

== See also ==
- List of rivers of New Zealand
