= Buller Gorge =

Coordinates: 41.8007°S 172.1098°E

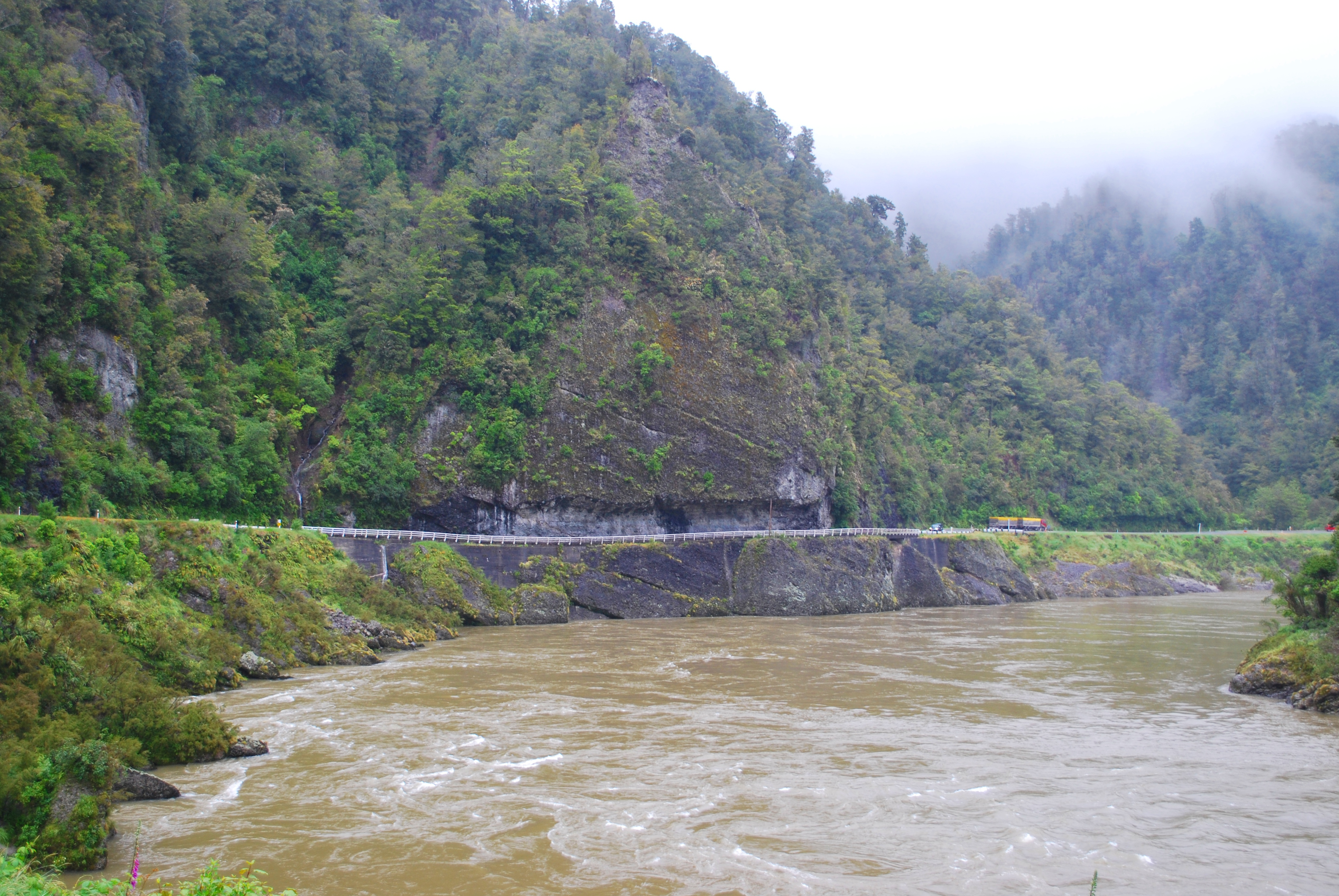
Hawk's Crag on the lower Buller Gorge

The Buller Gorge is a gorge located in the northwest of the South Island of New Zealand. The Buller River flows through the deep canyon between Murchison and Westport. Land Information New Zealand lists two sections for the gorge, Upper Buller Gorge and Lower Buller Gorge. State Highway 6 runs alongside, but considerably above, the river through the gorge. The Stillwater - Westport Line railway also runs through the gorge.

New Zealand's longest swingbridge at 110 metres (360 ft) in length spans the Buller River 14 kilometres (9 mi) west of Murchison. That area also offers rides on a zip-line across the gorge as well as several short bush walks.

The gorge and river both take their name from Charles Buller, Member of Parliament in the United Kingdom of Great Britain and Ireland (UK) and director of the New Zealand Company, a UK-based company in the early 1800s with a royal charter supporting colonization efforts of New Zealand.
