= Ikamatua =

- town
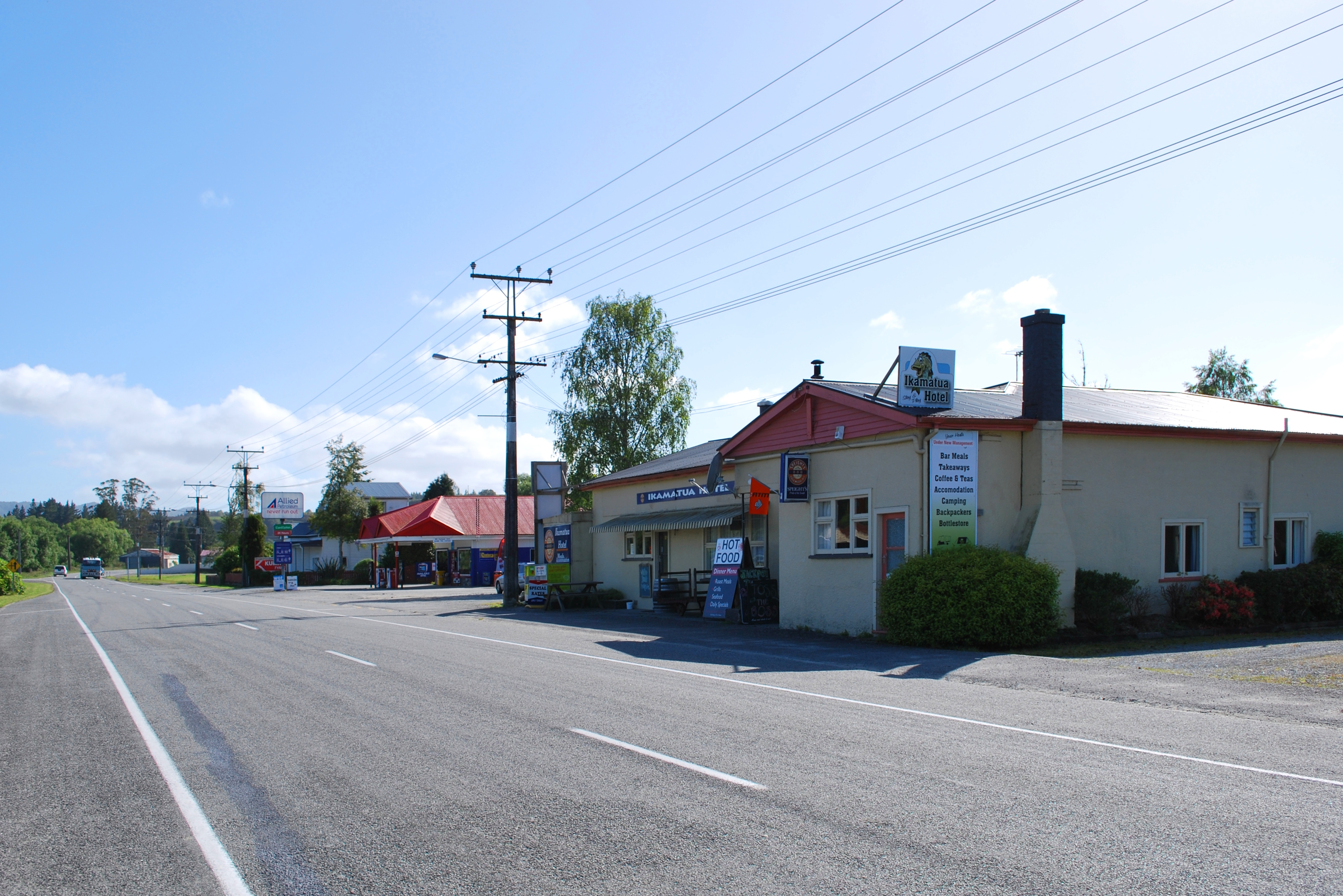
- State Highway 7 passing through Ikamatua

- Location within New Zealand
- Coordinates: 42°16′17.13″S 171°41′3.77″E
- Country: New Zealand
- Region: West Coast
- Territorial authority: Buller District
- Electorates: West Coast-Tasman; Te Tai Tonga
- Time zone: UTC+12 (New Zealand Standard Time)
  - Summer (DST): UTC+13 (New Zealand Daylight Time)

Ikamatua is a small village on the West Coast of the South Island in New Zealand. Its name translates literally as ika (fish) and matua (mature/parent). It may be a contraction of Te Ika-a-matua, fish of my ancestor.

It is located on the State Highway 7 inland route, 50 kilometres (31 mi) north of Greymouth and 28 kilometres (17 mi) south of Reefton. It has a population of under 200.

In 1946, 4 km north of Ikamatua, the floating Grey River gold dredge dug its way across State Highway 7, and the main Greymouth to Westport railway link, to move into its new mining area in the Blackwater Valley. This was the first and only time that such an event has occurred in New Zealand.

In 1906 Ikamatua had two sawmills, a creamery, a railway station and a school.

== Demographics ==
Ikamatua and its environs, which include Waiuta, cover 640.20 km^{2} (247.18 sq mi) It is part of the larger Inangahua statistical area.

Historical population
Year	Pop.	±% p.a.
2006	357	—
2013	384	+1.05%
2018	342	−2.29%
2023	351	+0.52%

The area had a population of 351 in the 2023 New Zealand census, an increase of 9 people (2.6%) since the 2018 census, and a decrease of 33 people (−8.6%) since the 2013 census. There were 186 males, 165 females, and 3 people of other genders in 156 dwellings. 2.6% of people identified as LGBTIQ+. There were 63 people (17.9%) aged under 15 years, 66 (18.8%) aged 15 to 29, 171 (48.7%) aged 30 to 64, and 54 (15.4%) aged 65 or older.

People could identify as more than one ethnicity. The results were 92.3% European (Pākehā); 12.8% Māori; 1.7% Pasifika; 4.3% Asian; 1.7% Middle Eastern, Latin American and African New Zealanders (MELAA); and 3.4% other, which includes people giving their ethnicity as "New Zealander". English was spoken by 96.6%, Māori by 1.7%, and other languages by 6.0%. No language could be spoken by 2.6% (e.g. too young to talk). New Zealand Sign Language was known by 0.9%. The percentage of people born overseas was 13.7, compared with 28.8% nationally.

Religious affiliations were 17.1% Christian, 3.4% Hindu, 0.9% Islam, 0.9% Māori religious beliefs, 0.9% Buddhist, and 1.7% other religions. People who answered that they had no religion were 66.7%, and 11.1% of people did not answer the census question.

Of those at least 15 years old, 18 (6.2%) people had a bachelor's or higher degree, 180 (62.5%) had a post-high school certificate or diploma, and 87 (30.2%) people exclusively held high school qualifications. 15 people (5.2%) earned over $100,000 compared to 12.1% nationally. The employment status of those at least 15 was 147 (51.0%) full-time, 39 (13.5%) part-time, and 12 (4.2%) unemployed.
