= Bridget Goodwin =

New Zealand goldminer, character

- Born: Bridget Goodwin c. 1827; Dublin, Ireland
- Died: 19 October 1899; Reefton, New Zealand
- Occupation: Miner

Bridget Goodwin (c. 1827–19 October 1899) was a New Zealand goldminer and character.

== Early life ==
Bridget Goodwin was born in Ireland, possibly in Dublin, some time between 1802 and 1827. Her parents' names are unknown. She had little or no education; according to the reminiscences, she was unable to read or write. She mined first at Bendigo and Ballarat in Australia and then sailed for New Zealand, arriving at Nelson in the mid-1860s. She mined in the Collingwood area and then, after a long overland trek to the West Coast, in the vicinity of the Buller River.

== Career ==
Bridget Goodwin lived and worked with two male goldminers. The threesome came from Australia to New Zealand together. Bridget Goodwin was a small woman, about four feet in height and of slight build. Nevertheless, she was capable of hard physical work. Gold prospecting involved scooping up, cradling and panning sands from river and stream beds. Often it was necessary to work standing in the water for hours on end. She coped with this, and also directed the work of the two men, who appear to have accepted her leadership. The three of them did not apparently make much money from gold prospecting. Whatever was left after the necessities had been bought was spent on drinking sprees.

== Old Biddy ==
There is some evidence that Bridget Goodwin and her companions settled in a hut not far from the Lyell township and mined close to Lyell in the 1880s and early 1890s. During this period the two men died. The man who survived longer is said to have been called 'Old Bill'. On the other hand, a poem entitled 'Biddy of the Buller', by the popular West Coast poet Hugh Smith, who moved from Ahaura to Reefton the year before Bridget Goodwin died, gives the name of her male companion as 'Jack'.

After the death of her second companion, in Reefton hospital, Bridget Goodwin settled in Reefton, where she spent the remainder of her life. At this stage she became known as 'Old Biddy' or 'Old Biddy of the Buller'. She was admitted to Reefton hospital at least twice during the late 1890s. During her Reefton residence, Bridget Goodwin was an Anglican and received regular visits from fellow parishioners, whom she entertained with stories of her early life.

== Death ==
She died at Reefton on 19 October 1899. Her age at death was variously given as 72, 86 and 96 years.

== Popularity ==
Bridget Goodwin seems to have been an enthusiastic pipe-smoker, and had a well-developed taste for alcohol. By Victorian standards, her morals were somewhat questionable. Yet her reputation for hard work under conditions of enormous hardship, for hospitality, for loyalty to her companions, and, strangely enough, for cleanliness, seems to have won her the affection and respect of contemporaries.

== See also ==
- Reefton Distilling Co.
