= Combatants of the Second Sino-Japanese War =

People who fought in the Japanese invasion of China

The Second Sino-Japanese War was fought between 1937 and 1945, involving the military forces of the China and Japan.

== Chinese forces ==
=== National Revolutionary Army ===
Flag of the National Revolutionary Army (later as the Republic of China Army)

With Chiang Kai-shek as the highest commander, the NRA is recognized as the unified armed force of China during the war. Throughout its lifespan, it employed approximately 5,700,000 regulars, in 370 Standard Divisions (simplified Chinese: 正式师; traditional Chinese: 正式師), 46 New Divisions (simplified Chinese: 新编师; traditional Chinese: 新編師), 12 Cavalry Divisions (simplified Chinese: 骑兵师; traditional Chinese: 騎兵師), eight New Cavalry Divisions (simplified Chinese: 新编骑兵师; traditional Chinese: 新編騎兵師), 66 Temporary Divisions (simplified Chinese: 暂编师; traditional Chinese: 暫編師), and 13 Reserve Divisions (simplified Chinese: 预备师; traditional Chinese: 預備師), for a grand total of 515 divisions.

However, many divisions were formed from two or more other divisions, and many were not active at the same time. The number of active divisions, at the start of the war in 1937, was about 170 NRA divisions. The average NRA division had 4,000–5,000 troops. A Chinese army was roughly the equivalent to a Japanese division in terms of manpower but the Chinese forces largely lacked artillery, heavy weapons, and motorized transport.

The shortage of military hardware meant that three to four Chinese armies had the firepower of only one Japanese division. Because of these material constraints, available artillery and heavy weapons were usually assigned to specialist brigades rather than to the general division, which caused more problems as the Chinese command structure lacked precise coordination. The relative fighting strength of a Chinese division was even weaker when relative capacity in aspects of warfare, such as intelligence, logistics, communications, and medical services, are taken into account.

Although Chiang Kai-shek is recognized as the highest commander in name, his power on NRA was in the effect limited. This was due to the fact that the NRA was an alliance of powers such as warlords, regional militarists and communists. Before the alliance was formed under the pressure of Japanese invasion, these powers had their own land, struggled or allied with each other under their own interests and mutual conflicts were common. Because of this, NRA could be unofficially divided into 3 groups, Central Army, Regional Army and Communist forces.

Loyal to Chiang Kai-shek, the Central Army(simplified Chinese: 中央军; traditional Chinese: 中央軍) was best equipped. Most of the officers in the Central Army were trained by the Whampoa Military Academy, where Chiang Kai-shek served as the first president. Before the war, the Central Army mainly controlled east China.

The Regional Army (simplified Chinese: 省军; traditional Chinese: 省軍) consisted of various types of strengths from all the parts of China. Before the war, these strengths governed certain places and most of them admitted Chiang Kai-shek's leader position. However, they didn't really follow Chiang's command, nor received Chiang's assistance. They generally ran independently. The notable strengths under this category included Guangxi, Shanxi, Yunnan and Ma clique.

After the Xi'an Incident, Chiang stopped his offensive against the Chinese Red Army. Communists were then incorporated into the NRA to form the Eighth Route Army and the New Fourth Army, although their de facto commander was still Mao Zedong. Communists also led a large number of militias during the war.

The NRA expanded from about 1.2 million in 1937 to 5.7 million in August 1945, organized in 300 divisions. This included the incorporation of women's battalions and corps to the army, such as the Guangxi Women's Battalion.

== Japanese forces ==
=== Imperial Japanese Army ===
Flag of the Imperial Japanese Army

The Imperial Japanese Army (IJA) had approximately 4,100,000 regulars. More Japanese troops were quartered in China than deployed elsewhere in the Pacific Theater during the war. Japanese divisions ranged from 20,000 men in its divisions numbered less than 100, to 10,000 men in divisions numbered greater than 100.

At the time of the attack on Pearl Harbor, the IJA had 51 divisions, of which 35 were in China, and 39 independent brigades, of which all but one were in China. This represented roughly 80% of the IJA's manpower.

By October 1944 the IJA in China was divided into three strategic groupings.

- The China Expeditionary Army was dislocated along the coast. Its primary component was the 13th Army with four divisions and two brigades.
- The North China Area Army occupied the north-eastern China. It included the Kwantung Army with two divisions and six brigades, the Mongolian Garrison Army with one division and one brigade, and the 1st Army with two divisions and six brigades.
- The Sixth Area Army occupying the inland zone south of the Yellow River included: the 12th Army with four divisions, including one armoured, and one infantry brigade; 34th Army with one division and four brigades along the Yangtze valley; 11th Army with ten divisions; 23rd Army with two divisions and five brigades.

=== Collaborationist Chinese Army ===
War Ensign of the Manchukuo Imperial Army

The Chinese armies allied to Japan had only 78,000 people in 1938, but had grown to around 649,640 men by 1943, and reached a maximum strength of 900,000 troops before the end of the war. Almost all of them belonged to Manchukuo, Provisional Government of the Republic of China (Beijing), Reformed Government of the Republic of China (Nanking) and the later Nanking Nationalist Government (Wang Jingwei regime). These collaborator troops were mainly assigned to garrison and logistics duties in their own territories, and were not fielded in combat very often because of low morale and Japanese distrust. In general, they fared very poorly in skirmishes against both Chinese NRA and Communist forces, although there were some individual collaborationist units that had some success against them.

== Military equipment ==
=== National Revolutionary Army ===
The Central Army possessed 80 Army infantry divisions of 8,000 men each, nine independent brigades, nine cavalry divisions, two artillery brigades, 16 artillery regiments and three armored battalions. The Chinese Navy displaced only 59,000 tonnes and the Chinese Air Force comprised only about 700 obsolete aircraft.

For regular provincial Chinese divisions their standard rifles were the Hanyang 88 (copy of Gewehr 88). Central army divisions were typically equipped with the Chiang Kai-shek rifle (copy of Mauser Standard Model) and Czechoslovak vz. 24. However, for most of the German-trained divisions, the standard firearms were German-made 7.92 mm Gewehr 98 and Karabiner 98k. The standard light machine gun was a local copy of the Czech 7.92 mm Brno ZB26. There were also Belgian and French light machine guns. Provincial units generally did not possess any machine guns. Central Army units had one LMG per platoon on average. German-trained divisions ideally had 1 LMG per squad. Surprisingly, the NRA did not purchase any Maschinengewehr 34s from Germany, but did produce their own copies of them. Heavy machine guns were mainly locally made Type 24 water-cooled Maxim guns, which were the Chinese copies of the German MG08, and M1917 Browning machine guns chambered for the standard 8mm Mauser round. On average, every Central Army battalion would get one heavy machine gun (about a third to half of what actual German divisions got during World War II).

The standard weapon for NCOs and officers was the 7.63 mm Mauser C96 semi-automatic pistol, or full-automatic Mauser M1932/M712 machine pistol. These full-automatic versions were used as substitutes for submachine guns (such as the MP 18) and rifles that were in short supply within the Chinese army prior to the end of World War II. Among officers, the German Parabellum (Luger) 9×19mm semi-automatic pistol was often the weapon of choice. Throughout the Second Sino-Japanese War, particularly in the early years, the NRA also extensively used captured Japanese weapons and equipment as their own were in short supply. Some élite units also used Lend-Lease US equipment as the war progressed.

Generally speaking, the regular provincial army divisions did not possess any artillery. However, some Central Army divisions were equipped with 37 mm PaK 35/36 anti-tank guns, and/or mortars from Oerlikon, Madsen, and Solothurn. Each infantry division had 6 French Brandt 81 mm mortars and 6 Solothurn 20 mm autocannons. Some independent brigades and artillery regiments were equipped with Bofors 72 mm L/14, or Krupp 72 mm L/29 mountain guns and there were 24 Rheinmetall 150 mm L/32 sFH 18 howitzers (bought in 1934) and 24 Krupp 150 mm L/30 sFH 18 howitzers (bought in 1936). At the start of the war, the NRA and the Tax Police Regiment had three tank battalions armed with German Panzer I light tanks and CV-33 tankettes. After defeat in the Battle of Shanghai the remaining tanks, together with several hundred T-26 and BT-5 tanks acquired from the Soviet Union were reorganised into the 200th Division.

Infantry uniforms were basically redesigned Zhongshan suits. Puttees were standard for soldiers and officers alike since the primary mode of movement for NRA troops was by foot. Troops were also issued sewn field caps. The helmets were the most distinguishing characteristic of these divisions. From the moment German M35 helmets (standard issue for the Wehrmacht until late in the European theatre) rolled off the production lines in 1935, and until 1936, the NRA imported 315,000 of these helmets, each with the Blue Sky with a White Sun emblem of the ROC on the sides. These helmets were worn by both elite German-trained divisions and regular Central Army divisions. Other helmets include the Adrian helmet, Brodie helmet and later M1 helmet. Other equipment included straw shoes for soldiers (cloth shoes for Central Army), leather shoes for officers and leather boots for high-ranking officers. Every soldier was issued ammunition, ammunition pouches or harness, a water flask, combat knives, food bag, and a gas mask.

On the other hand, warlord forces varied greatly in terms of equipment and training. Some warlord troops were notoriously under-equipped, such as Shanxi's Dadao (Chinese: 大刀, a one-edged sword type close combat weapon) Team and the Yunnan clique. Some, however, were highly professional forces with their own air force and navies. The quality of the New Guangxi clique was almost on par with the Central Army, as the Guangzhou region was wealthy and the local army could afford foreign instructors and arms. The Muslim Ma clique to the northwest was famed for its well-trained cavalry divisions.

=== Imperial Japanese Army ===
Although Japan possessed significant mobile operational capacity, it did not possess capability for maintaining a long sustained war. At the beginning of the war, the Imperial Japanese Army comprised 17 divisions, each composed of approximately 22,000 men, 5,800 horses, 9,500 rifles and submachine guns, 600 heavy machine guns of assorted types, 108 artillery pieces, and 600 plus of light armor two-men tanks. Special forces were also available. The Imperial Japanese Navy displaced a total of 1,900,000 tonnes, ranking third in the world, and possessed 2,700 aircraft at the time. Each Japanese division was the equivalent in fighting strength of four Chinese regular divisions (at the beginning of the Battle of Shanghai).

== Forces involved ==
Growth of the Chinese Army
| | June 1939 | December 1943 |
|---|---|---|
| Rifles | 775,520 | 1,000,000 |
| Machine guns | 59,663 | 83,000 |
| Mortars | 4,403 | 7,800 |
| Field artillery | 910 | 1,330 |
| Personnel | 2,600,000 | 3,000,000 |

Opposing forces, October 1, 1939
| | Chinese | | | | Japanese | | | |
| | Northern Front | Central Front | Southern Front | Total | Northern Front | Central Front | Southern Front | Total |
|---|---|---|---|---|---|---|---|---|
| Infantry divisions | 75 | 99 | 31 | 205 | 15 | 11 | 2 | 28 |
| Infantry brigades | 34 | 2 | 2 | 38 | 9 | 4 | 2 | 15 |
| Cavalry divisions | 11 | 1 | 0 | 12 | 0 | 0 | 0 | 0 |
| Cavalry brigades | 10 | 0 | 0 | 10 | 1 | 1 | 0 | 2 |
| Artillery brigades | 0 | 0 | 0 | 0 | 2 | 2 | 0 | 4 |
| Artillery regiments (Note: Independent of other units listed) | unknown | unknown | unknown | 38 | 1 | 1 | 1 | 3 |
| AAA regiments | unknown | unknown | unknown | 5 | 1 | 1 | 0 | 2 |
| Other AAA units | 0 | 0 | 0 | 0 | 0 | 1 | 0 | 1 |
| Mortar regiments | 0 | 0 | 0 | 0 | 1 | 0 | 0 | 1 |
| Tank regiments | unknown | unknown | unknown | 1 | 3 | 3 | 0 | 6 |
| Tank battalions | unknown | unknown | unknown | 1 | 1 | 2 | 1 | 4 |
| Rail regiments | unknown | unknown | unknown | 1 | 3 | 2 | 0 | 5 |
| Engineer regiments | unknown | unknown | unknown | 7 | 5 | 5 | 1 | 11 |
| Mechanized brigades | 0 | 0 | 0 | 0 | 0 | 1 | 0 | 1 |
| Machine gun battalions | 0 | 0 | 0 | 0 | 3 | 3 | 2 | 8 |
| Other battalions | 0 | 0 | 0 | 0 | 0 | 0 | 6 | 6 |
| Light artillery regiments | unknown | unknown | unknown | 6 | 0 | 0 | 0 | 0 |
| Armored groups | 0 | 0 | 0 | 0 | 0 | 0 | 0 | 0 |
| Mountain artillery regiments | 0 | 0 | 0 | 0 | 0 | 2 | 2 | 4 |
| Field artillery (Note: Excluding mortors) | unknown | unknown | unknown | 2,036 | 1,565 | 1,353 | 344 | 3,262 |
| Tanks and AFVs | unknown | unknown | unknown | 207 | 342 | 505 | 95 | 942 |
| Aircraft | unknown | unknown | unknown | 220 | 390 | 500 | 190 | 1,080 |
| Personnel | 788,000 | 856,000 | 154,000 | 2,257,000 | 485,000 | 420,000 | 110,000 | 1,015,000 |

Opposing forces, March 1, 1941
| | Chinese | | | | Japanese | | | |
| | Northern Front | Central Front | Southern Front | Total | Northern Front | Central Front | Southern Front | Total |
|---|---|---|---|---|---|---|---|---|
| Infantry divisions | 95 | 147 | 38 | 280 | 9 | 12 | 6 | 27 |
| Infantry brigades | 37 | 12 | 3 | 52 | 13 | 7 | 0 | 20 |
| Cavalry divisions | 13 | 0 | 0 | 13 | 0 | 0 | 0 | 0 |
| Cavalry brigades | 9 | 0 | 0 | 9 | 2 | 1 | 0 | 3 |
| Artillery brigades | unknown | unknown | unknown | 2 | 2 | 2 | 2 | 6 |
| Artillery regiments | unknown | unknown | unknown | 7 | 1 | 1 | 0 | 2 |
| Mountain artillery regiments | unknown | unknown | unknown | 11 | 2 | 2 | 2 | 6 |
| AT regiments | unknown | unknown | unknown | 6 | 0 | 0 | 0 | 0 |
| AAA regiments | unknown | unknown | unknown | 6 | 2 | 2 | 1 | 5 |
| Other AAA units | 0 | 0 | 0 | 0 | 15 | 16 | 9 | 40 |
| Mortar regiments | unknown | unknown | unknown | 6 | 1 | 0 | 0 | 1 |
| Tank regiments | unknown | unknown | unknown | 2 | 2 | 2 | 1 | 5 |
| Tank battalions | unknown | unknown | unknown | 1 | 5 | 2 | 2 | 9 |
| Rail regiments | unknown | unknown | unknown | 1 | 3 | 1 | 0 | 4 |
| Engineer regiments | unknown | unknown | unknown | 6 | 5 | 5 | 1 | 11 |
| Machine gun battalions | 0 | 0 | 0 | 0 | 4 | 4 | 2 | 10 |
| Armored groups | unknown | unknown | unknown | 9 | 0 | 0 | 0 | 0 |
| Field artillery (Note: Excluding mortars, AAA, and AT) | 620 | 600 | 180 | 1,400 | 1,020 | 1,044 | 484 | 2,548 |
| Tanks and tankettes | 39 | 122 | 0 | 161 | 259 | 293 | 190 | 742 |
| Aircraft | unknown | unknown | unknown | 164 | 140 | 340 | 420 | 900 |
| Personnel | 1,200,000 | 1,460,000 | 500,000 | 3,160,000 | 390,000 | 400,000 | 210,000 | 1,000,000 |
