= Reefton Power Station =

Power station in New Zealand

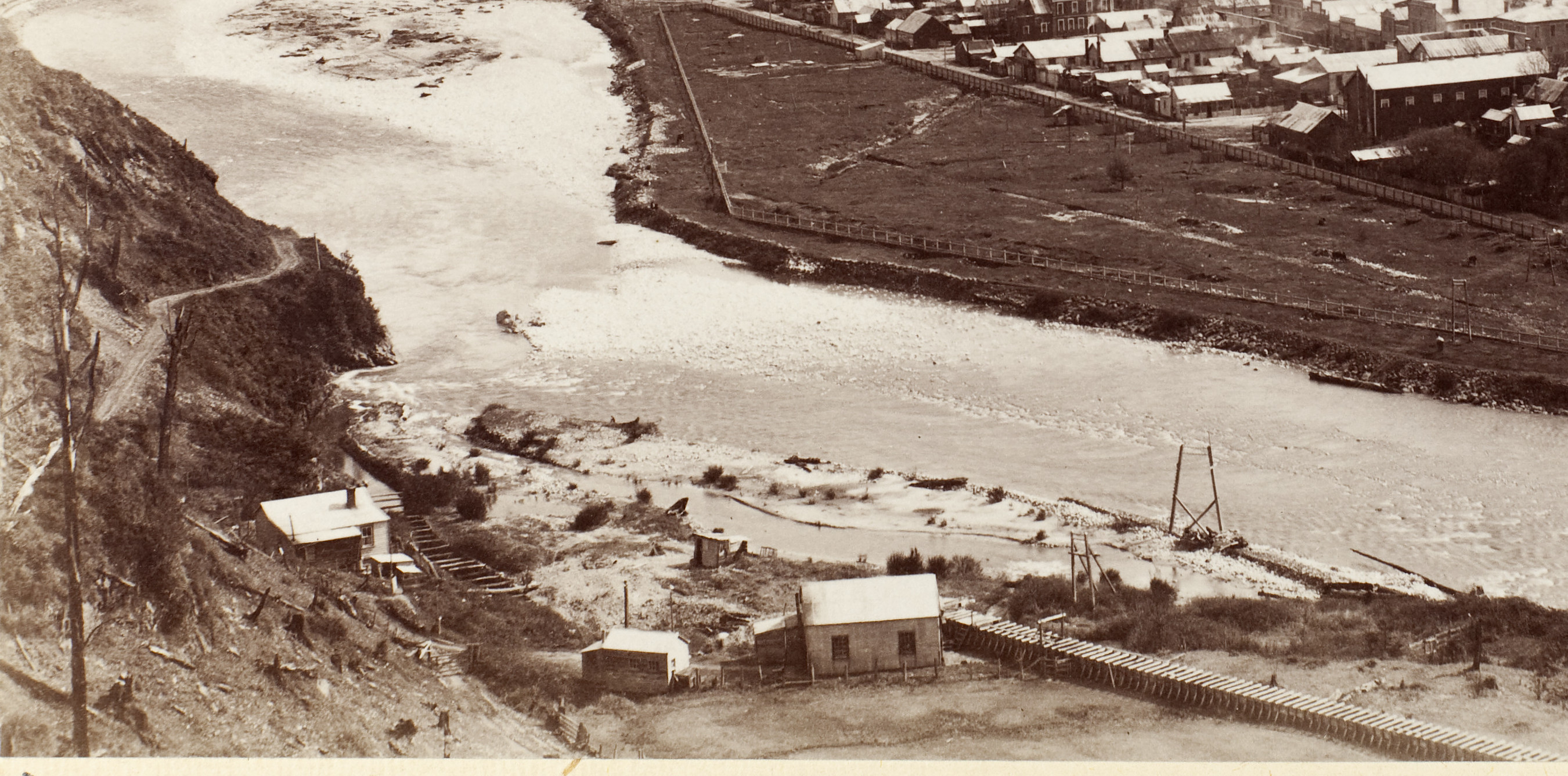
- Reefton power station 1904. The building in the centre foreground is the original power house commissioned in 1888. Water arrives at the penstock in timber fluming on the right delivered by a water-race and tunnel from an intake at Black's Point. The vertical turbine is hidden from view by the powerhouse containing the belt-driven generator. The tail race carries spent water to the river at the left of the powerhouse.
- Country: New Zealand
- Location: Reefton
- Coordinates: 42°7.291′S 171°52.171′E
- Status: Decommissioned
- Commission date: 1888
- Decommission date: 1949
- Owners: 1888 – The Reefton Electrical Transmission of Power and Lighting Company Ltd; 1946 – Grey Electric Power Board

Thermal power station
- Primary fuel: Hydroelectric and steam

External links
- Commons: Related media on Commons

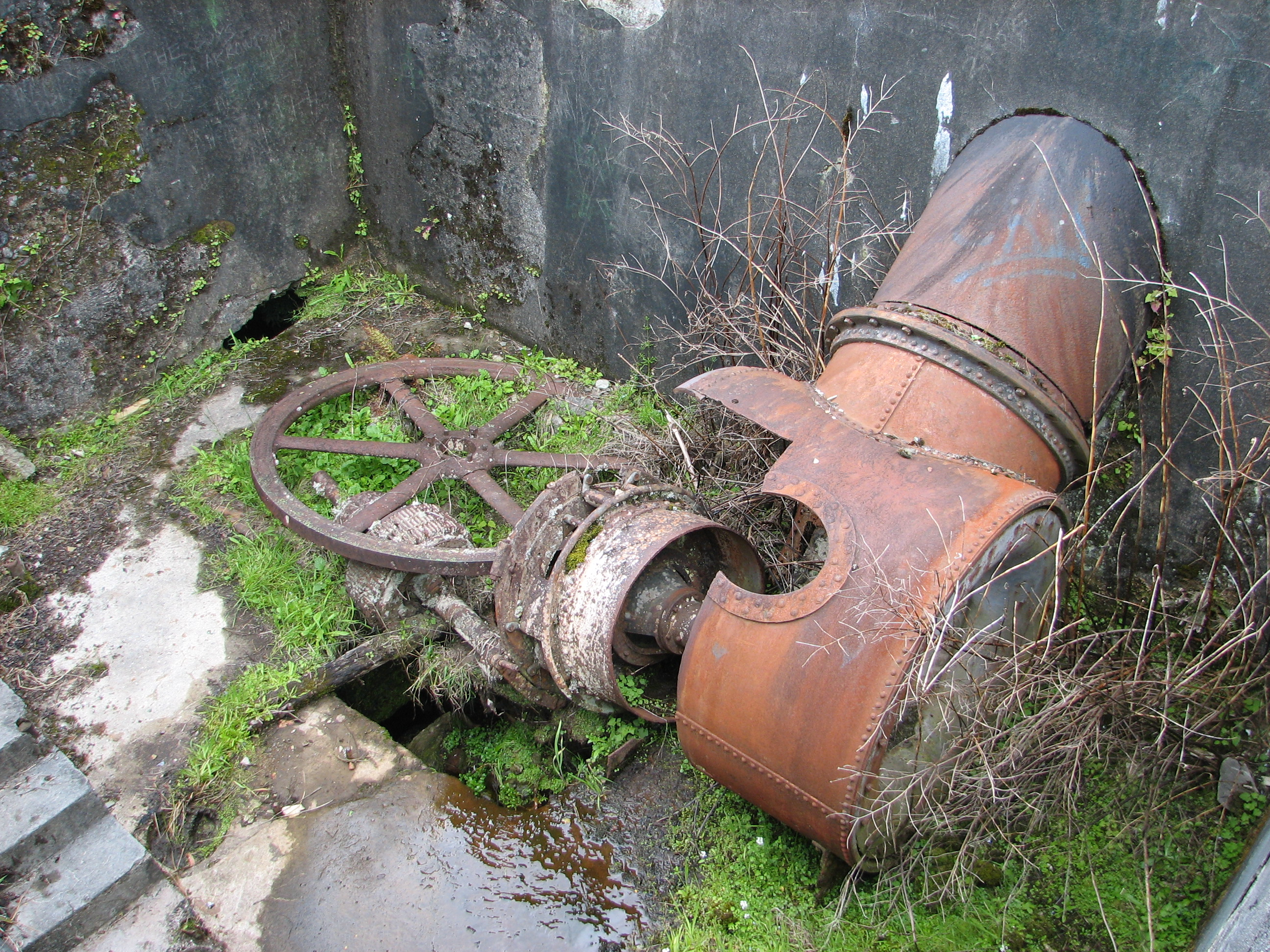
The power station turbine room 2008

Reefton Power Station supplied electricity to the very prosperous gold mining town of Reefton in New Zealand and was the first power station to supply municipal electricity in the Southern Hemisphere. It started operation on 4 August 1888.

Reefton man George Rich Wylde (1858-1942), son of James Wylde, brought samples of Edison and Swan electric lamps back from a visit to Victoria, Australia returning on 8 January 1883 and a public meeting was called to consider an electricity generating and distribution enterprise for Reefton. Ross & Glendinning had been lighting one of their Dunedin factories with electricity since 1882.

The Reefton Electric Light and Power Company was formed in 1886. The decision to build a power station was taken in the same year, following a demonstration of electric lighting in four Reefton hotels. The demonstration was organised by amateur electrician Walter Prince.

The power station turbine was run by water supplied from the Inangahua River via two tunnels and a headrace flume. The Grey Electric Power Board purchased the scheme in 1946. After the town was connected to the national grid in 1949 the power station was decommissioned. Since the Reefton system used 220 volts direct current while the national grid used 230 volts 50 hertz alternating current, a motor–generator was installed at the power station site to supply customers until rewiring was completed. The power house was demolished in 1961.

The Reefton Power Station was recognised by Heritage New Zealand as a Category 2 Historic Place on 30 August 1990 (List no. 5002).

Parts of the original structure remain and are accessible via a walking track, and a Trust was formed in 2012 with the goal of restoring the historic powerplant. Stage 1 of this planned restoration was completed on 11 April 2015, and included new signage, riverbank preservation and walking track restoration.

In September 2020 a new 4 tonne turbine costing $800,000 was delivered as part of a $5M restoration project, and as of early 2026 the power plant had been restored and was once again generating power.

The Bottled Lightning walking trail takes visitors across the Inangahua River to the site of the powerhouse

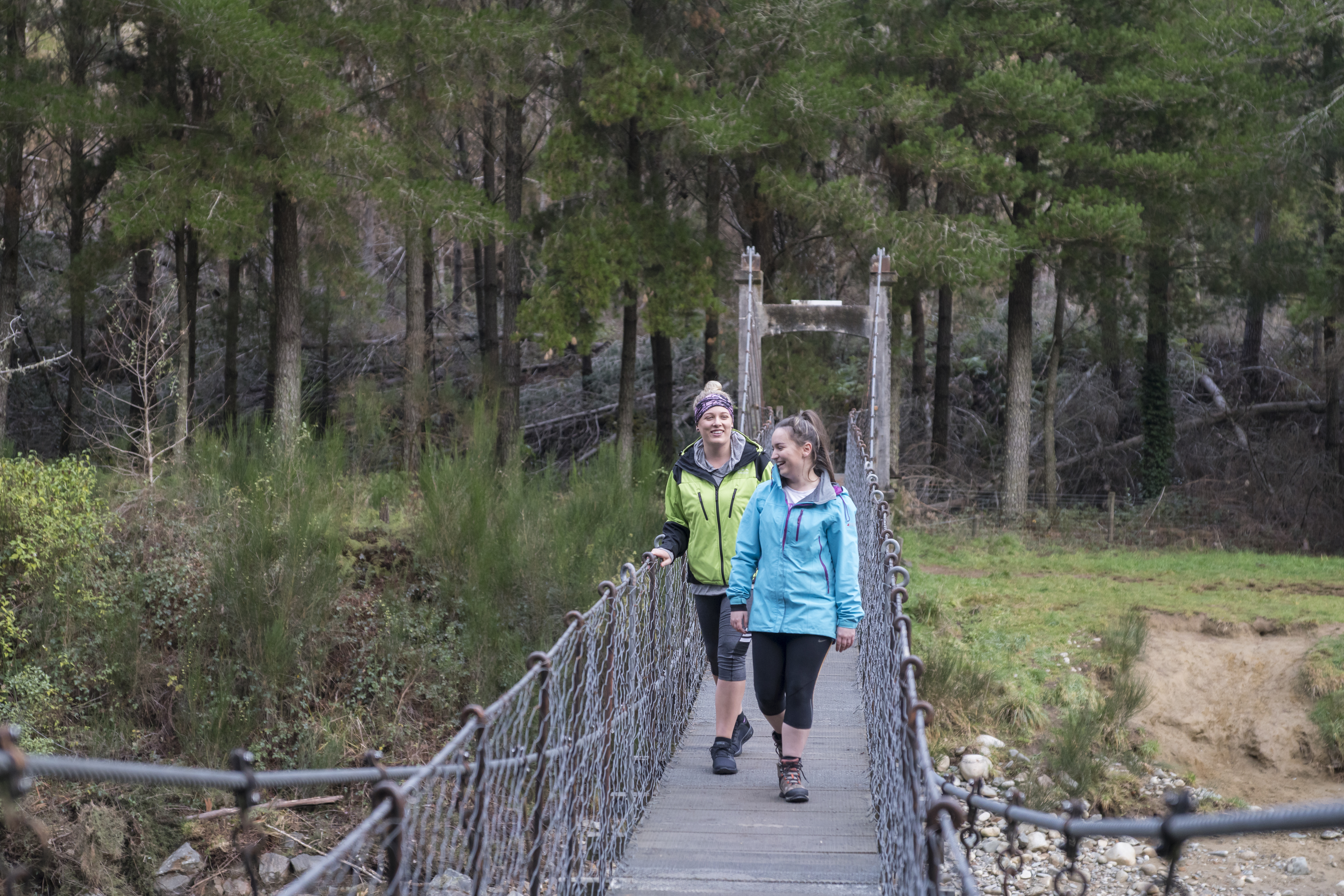

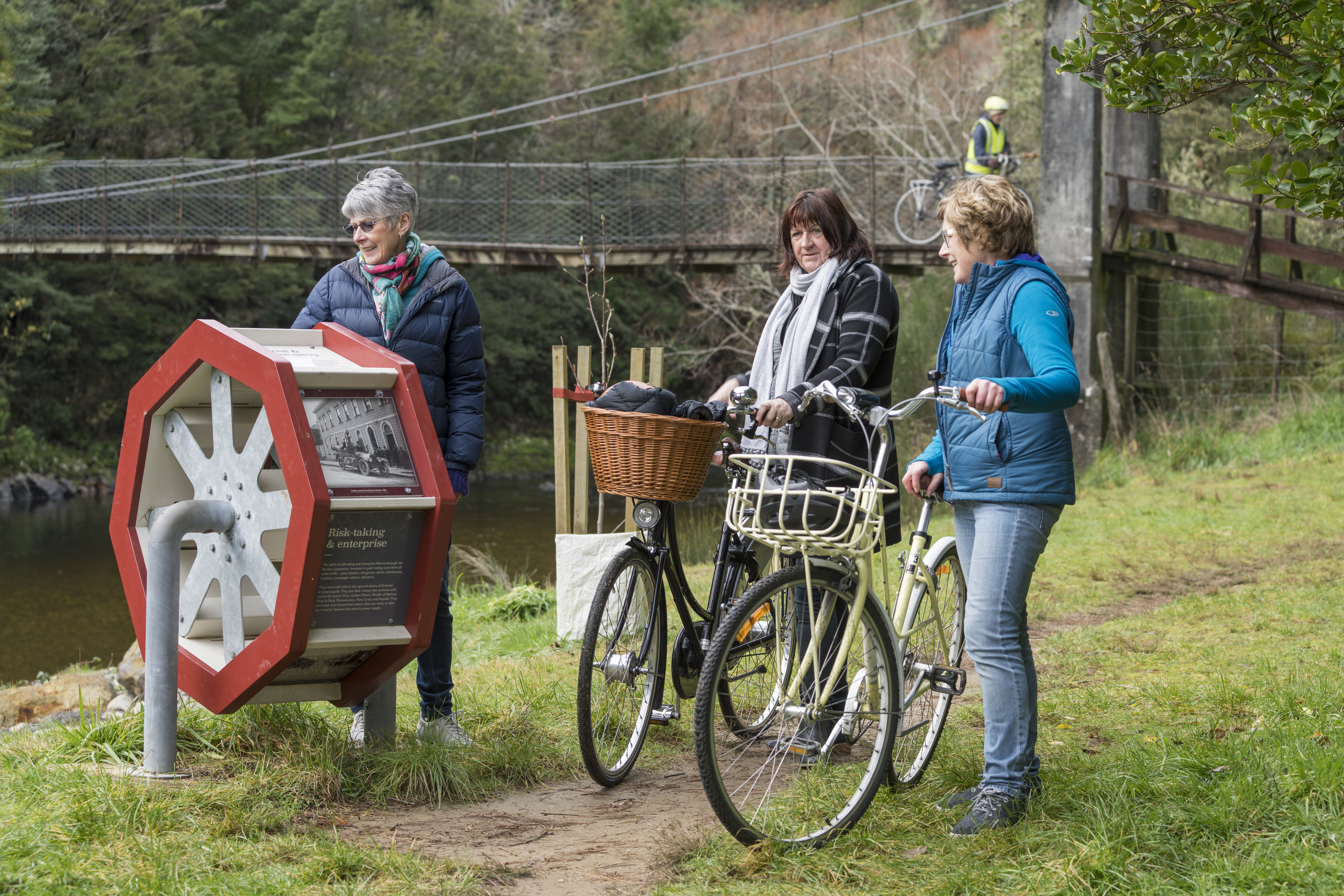

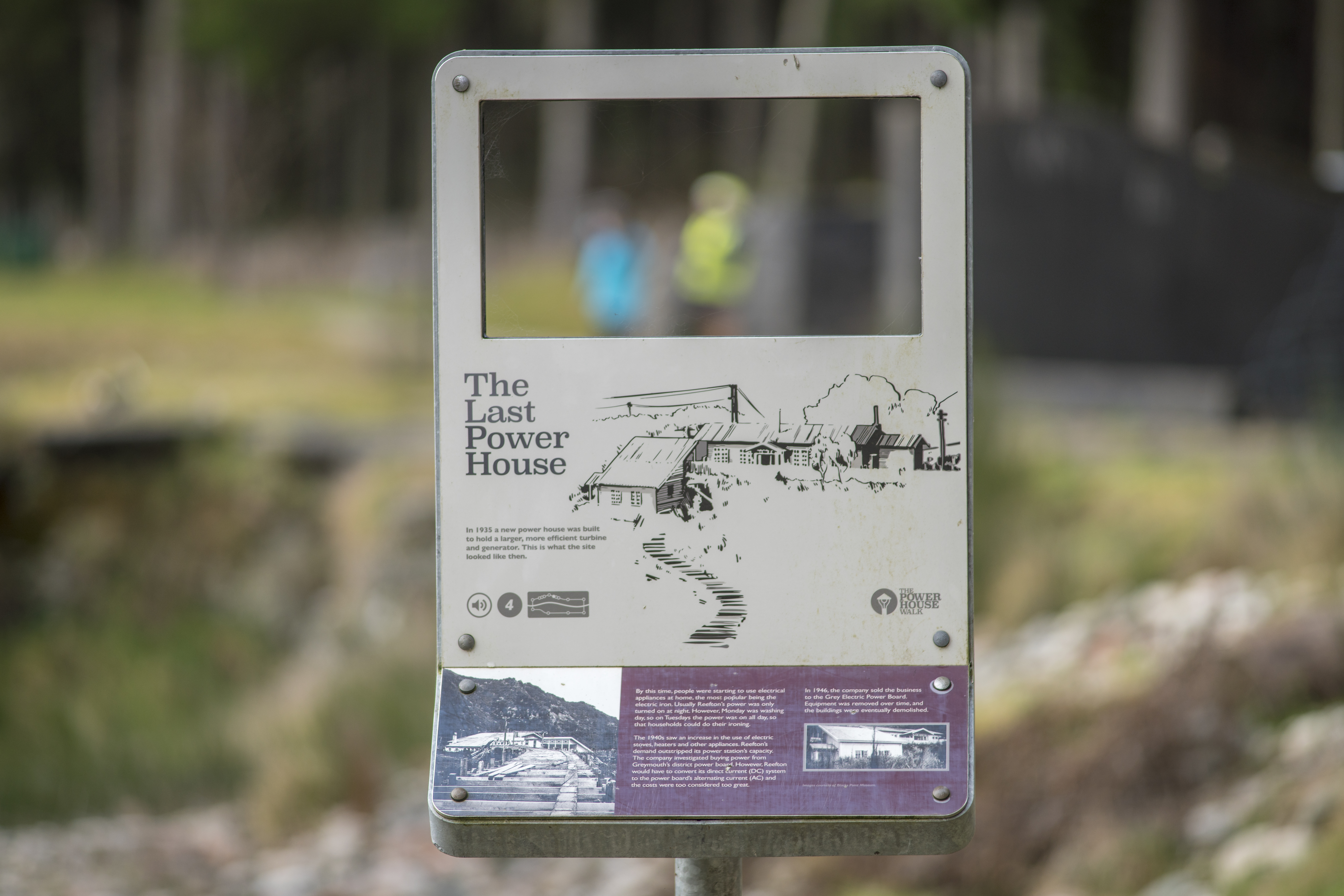

== See also ==
- Electricity sector in New Zealand
- List of power stations in New Zealand
