= Jane Preshaw =

New Zealand nurse, midwife and hospital matron (1839–1926)

Jane Preshaw (née Norgate; 30 May 1839 – 12 December 1926) was a New Zealand nurse, midwife and hospital matron of Reefton Hospital.

== Biography ==
Preshaw was born in Little Plumstead, Norfolk, England, in 1839. She emigrated to Melbourne, Australia in 1856, at age 17, where she became a general servant and later a domestic nurse and midwife. During her time in Melbourne she gave birth to her daughter Alice in January 1860. She was not married Alice's father, Henry Smith and registered her daughter as Alice Gotrow. Jane later married David Gerald McCarthy who also went by the name Timothy O'Brien. Jane then married bigamously Martin Pitersen (Peterson) just before she left for New Zealand.

In about 1868 Jane O'Brien and Alice left Melbourne for Hokitika, New Zealand, and later settled in Reefton. Preshaw worked as a nurse and midwife, becoming the first matron of Reefton Hospital in 1876. She married the hospital's chemist David Ogilvy Preshaw in 1879. Together they were the first Master and Matron of the hospital. They ran the hospital together until 1901 after which Preshaw continued to work as a private midwife.

She died in Reefton in 1926.
