= Elisabeth Croll =

New Zealand anthropologist

Elisabeth Croll CMG
- Born: 21 September 1944; Reefton, New Zealand
- Died: 3 October 2007 (aged 63); London, England

Academic background
- Education: University of Canterbury; SOAS, University of London

Academic work
- Discipline: Anthropology
- Institutions: SOAS, University of London; United Nations; University of Sussex; Princeton University; University of Oxford; International Institute of Social Studies; Wolfson College, Oxford

Elisabeth Joan "Lisa" Croll, CMG (21 September 1944 – 3 October 2007) was a New Zealand anthropologist. She is known as the first anthropologist to visit Chinese villages in a period when political actions made access into the country for foreigners difficult. Croll published books on the subject and held several short-term fellowships at various educational institutions. She also worked for United Nations agencies and international non-government organisations.

== Early life ==
Croll was born Elizabeth Sprackett in the remote New Zealand town of Reefton on the country's South Island on 21 September 1944. Her father, a Presbyterian minister, came from a poor background, while her mother's family was involved in the foundation of New Zealand's first university. They had ties with China from the early 20th century and her father worked with Chinese refugees in the early 1960s, with included a three-month period in Hong Kong. Croll's parents ingrained her with a lifelong love of books and learning, along with a powerful sense of duty. She preferred to be called "Lisa". Croll was educated at a Christchurch school, and later studied for a Bachelor of Arts and Master of Arts history degree at the University of Canterbury. In 1962, her family reclocated to Sydney. Croll chose to remain in New Zealand because she was still reading and met Jim Croll whom she married in 1966. They had two children, Nicholas and Katherine. She moved with Jim to London after he was offered a Lectureship in civil engineering at University College. Croll graduated from the SOAS, University of London with a Master of Arts in Far Eastern Studies and Doctor of Philosophy degree in Chinese anthropology in 1977. Her time at the university allowed her to develop an interest in anthropology and China.

== Career ==
She undertook two-week missions research trips into rural China, and was the first anthropologist to get to villages when political actions made foreigners access into the country difficult. Croll gained the Chinese people's trust, allowing for fellow Western anthropologists to follow in her footsteps. Long term travel into the country was not possible in that period, although she became a prominent person within SOAS. She published her first book Feminism and Socialism in China in 1978, and pioneered a study of Chinese women's movement. Croll's second book, Politics of Marriage in Contemporary China published in 1981, brought an anthropological approach study to political reform. It suggested Chinese government's marriage reforms which was based on free decision and sexual equality would be difficult to enforce and conflict between elderly people and the state would be produced. She later wrote the books Food in the Domestic Economy in China (1983), Chinese Women Since Mao (1984) and China's One-Child Family Policy and Women and Rural Development in China in 1985.

Croll held a number of short-term fellowships at the Contemporary China Institute, SOAS's Department of Anthropology, University of Sussex's Institute of Development Studies, the Oxford Department of International Development, Wolfson College, Oxford, Princeton University and the International Institute of Social Studies. She was appointed SOAS' lecturer in anthropology in 1990, and became its senior lecturer one year later. Croll became a reader in 1993, before becoming professor of Chinese anthropology in 1995. Croll started an anthropology of development course, one of the first in the United Kingdom and petitioned to include a social element to the programme. In that period, she wrote two further books called From Heaven to Earth: Images and Experiences of Development in China in 1993, and Changing Identities of Chinese Women: rhetoric, experience and self-perception in 20th-century China two years later. Croll was a regular worker for a large variety of agencies of the United Nations, including the International Labour Organization, World Bank, Ford Foundation, the Department for International Development, Food and Agriculture Organization, International Fund for Agricultural Development, UNICEF and several international non-government organisations.

=== Later career and death ===
She was an adviser to the All-China Women's Federation on issues relating to gender, and was involved in campaigns to highlight's an issue over missing girls and unwanted daughters in China and Asia. Croll counselled the country's government on issues concerning poverty alleviation, social development and gender issues. At the Royal Society of Asian Affairs, she was its executive member, vice-chairperson of the Great Britain-China Centre. Croll was appointed to the United Nations Council in Tokyo in 1998. She was later elected its Vice-Chairperson in 2002, before becoming Chairperson two years later. Croll founded the Chair of the Centre of Chinese Studies and was head of its Department of Development Studies. She was appointed SOAS' Vice-Principal with special responsibility for External Relations. Her final book China's New Consumers: Social Development and Domestic Demand was published in autumn 2006. Croll died of cancer on 3 October 2007 in London. She was due to receive the CMG from the Queen on 10 October "for services to Higher Education, especially in promoting understanding of China's social development", but due to her death, her daughter received it on Croll's behalf.

== See also ==
- Guangxi Women's Battalion
