= Amy Castle (entomologist) =

New Zealand entomologist and museum curator

- Born: 9 May 1880; Maori Gully, near Reefton, New Zealand
- Died: 23 February 1971 (aged 90); Paignton, Devon, England,
- Known for: Reorganising, remounting and cataloguing the Lepidoptera
- Scientific career
- Fields: Entomology
- Institutions: Dominion Museum, Wellington, New Zealand

Amy Castle (9 May 1880 – 23 February 1971) was a New Zealand museum curator and entomologist.

== Biography ==
She was born in Maori Gully, near Reefton, West Coast, New Zealand on 9 May 1880. She was the first female scientist to be employed in the public service sector in New Zealand. She also played an important role in the history of New Zealand museums, as the first entomologist and first professional woman to be employed by one.

She was first employed by the Dominion Museum as a temporary photography assistant in early 1907, and was appointed to permanent staff by July. She later transferred to the entomological collection, working under Augustus Hamilton. On Hamilton's sudden death in 1913, she took charge of the entomological collections, and her primary task until 1915 was the reorganising, remounting and cataloguing the Lepidoptera, which remained her main research focus as her career progressed. She collected all over the North Island, including Kapiti Island, Mt Taranaki, and the Rimutaka Range, as well as much further afield in Whangamarino and Whangārei.

She was actively involved in educating the public about insects and entomology, through speaking with school children on class visits and public lectures to adults. In 1915 she organised for collection equipment and information to be given to school children, though was disappointed that this did not result in many donations to the collection. A revised attempt in 1918 resulted in a group of boys interested in learning about moths and butterflies, with weekly meetings for them to pin and catalogue their finds.

In 1921, she was elected a Fellow of the Entomological Society of London, with her position listed as Assistant Entomologist.

In 1939, she was honoured by G.P. Whitley and W.J. Phillips who named a newly discovered fish after her "in recognition of generous help accorded one of us in identifying insects from the stomachs of fish". Unfortunately, this subsequently turned out to be a junior synonym of Galaxias brevipinnis.

She remained at the museum until 1931, when the government reduced staffing levels to save money during the depression. Her life after this is unknown, until 1957 when she left Wellington for Paignton, Devon, England, where she died in 1971, aged 90. She never married.

== Awards and honours ==
In 2017, she was selected as one of the Royal Society of New Zealand's "150 women in 150 words", celebrating the contributions of women to knowledge in New Zealand.

== Selected publications ==
- (1925)."Lepidoptera collected at York Bay, Wellington, in 1924." New Zealand Journal of Science and Technology. 8(1): 32–34.
- Philpott, A.; Castle, A.; Andersen, J.C. (1925)."Australian Lepidoptera in New Zealand." New Zealand Journal of Science and Technology. 7(6): 364–367.
