= Blacks Point =

Coordinates: 42°7′44″S 171°53′2″E

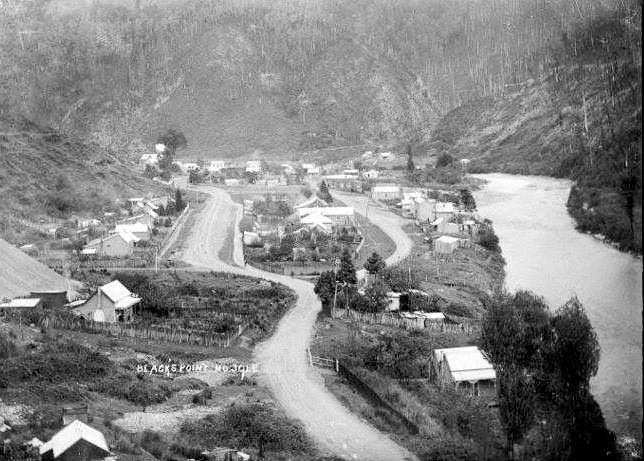
Blacks Point in 1910

Blacks Point is a locality near Reefton on the West Coast of the South Island of New Zealand.

Blacks Point is located south-west of Reefton on State Highway 7 adjacent to the Inangahua River. The settlement is one of many that were founded in the early 1870s, at a time when over 80 mines were being sunk into the gold-bearing quartz reefs in the Reefton area. Most of the settlers who formed the township of Blacks Point in 1873 were miners from Cornwall.

One attraction is the Blacks Point Museum, a former Wesleyan Methodist Church from 1876 converted to a museum that displays the history of a typical mining town.

== Demographics ==
Blacks Point and its environs, which include Crushington and Big River, cover 588.18 km^{2} (227.10 sq mi) The area surrounds but does not include Reefton. It is part of the larger Inangahua statistical area.

Historical population
Year	Pop.	±% p.a.
2006	144	—
2013	165	+1.96%
2018	168	+0.36%
2023	171	+0.35%

The area had a population of 171 in the 2023 New Zealand census, an increase of 3 people (1.8%) since the 2018 census, and an increase of 6 people (3.6%) since the 2013 census. There were 87 males and 84 females in 87 dwellings. 1.8% of people identified as LGBTIQ+. The median age was 53.4 years (compared with 38.1 years nationally). There were 18 people (10.5%) aged under 15 years, 12 (7.0%) aged 15 to 29, 90 (52.6%) aged 30 to 64, and 48 (28.1%) aged 65 or older.

People could identify as more than one ethnicity. The results were 94.7% European (Pākehā); 12.3% Māori; 1.8% Middle Eastern, Latin American and African New Zealanders (MELAA); and 3.5% other, which includes people giving their ethnicity as "New Zealander". English was spoken by 98.2%, Māori by 1.8%, and other languages by 3.5%. No language could be spoken by 1.8% (e.g. too young to talk). The percentage of people born overseas was 10.5, compared with 28.8% nationally.

Religious affiliations were 28.1% Christian, and 1.8% other religions. People who answered that they had no religion were 63.2%, and 7.0% of people did not answer the census question.

Of those at least 15 years old, 21 (13.7%) people had a bachelor's or higher degree, 81 (52.9%) had a post-high school certificate or diploma, and 51 (33.3%) people exclusively held high school qualifications. The median income was $30,500, compared with $41,500 nationally. 15 people (9.8%) earned over $100,000 compared to 12.1% nationally. The employment status of those at least 15 was 63 (41.2%) full-time, 27 (17.6%) part-time, and 3 (2.0%) unemployed.
