= Reefton Distilling Co. =

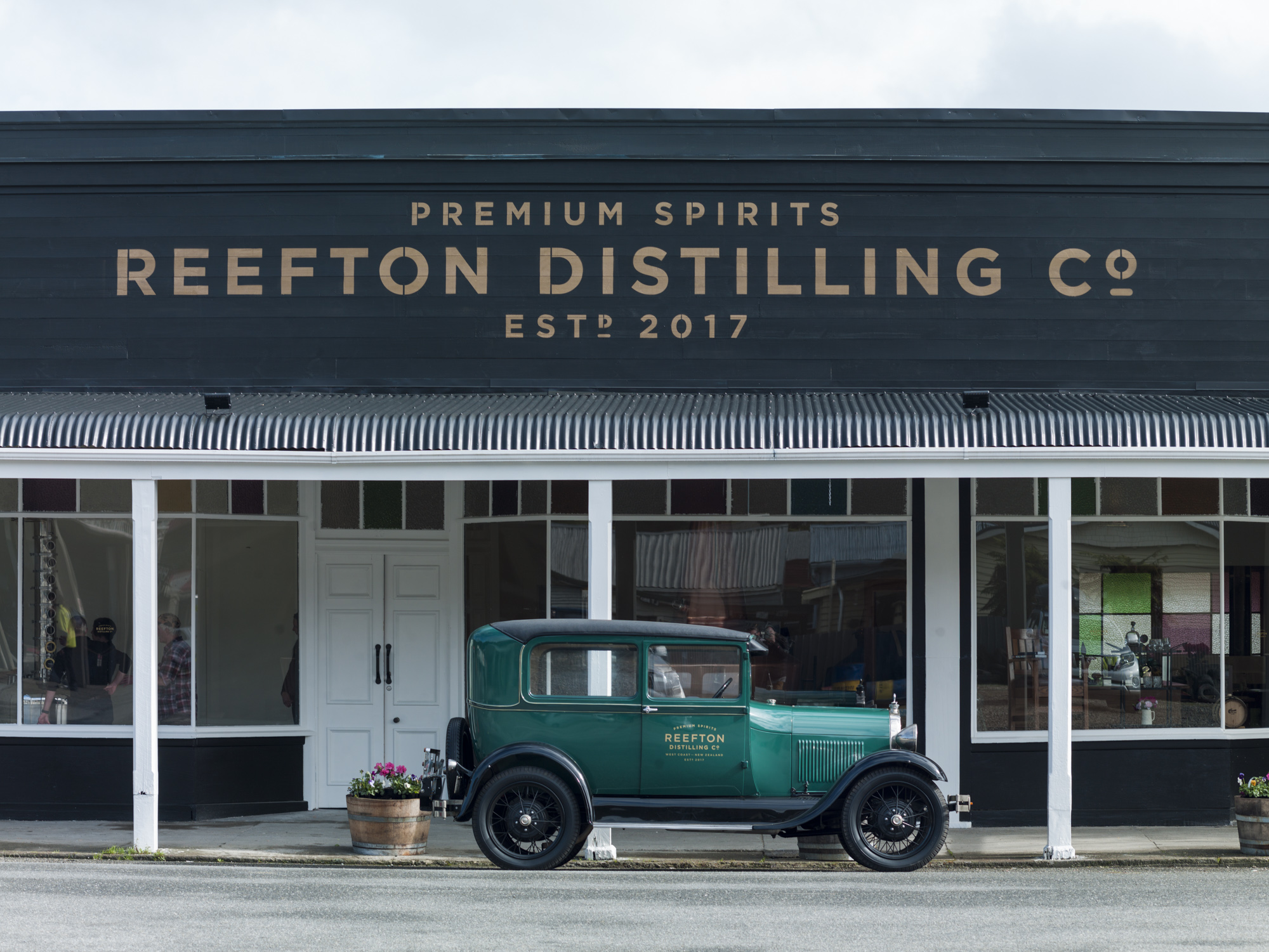
- Founded: 2017
- Headquarters: Reefton, New Zealand
- Products: gin, vodka, liqueurs
- Website: www.reeftondistillingco.com

The Reefton Distilling Co. is a distillery founded in 2017 in Reefton, in the West Coast region of New Zealand. It specialises in gin, including one named "Little Biddy" after famed West Coast gold miner Bridget Goodwin.

== Origins ==
The Reefton Distilling Co. was founded by Reefton-born Patsy Bass. Managing director Bass raised $1.385 million in equity to set up the distillery, from a mixture of large investors in New Zealand and Australia and members of the Reefton and West Coast community, exceeding the $1.1 million needed. Bass and her husband Shane Thrower moved back to Reefton to open the distillery.

The distillery opened in an 1870s building on 10 Smith Street in October 2018, initially 10 am to 4 pm Tuesday to Saturday. It employed four locals, two part-time and two full time. Nick Secker from Blackball was hired as head distiller, and later Beth Scott as a second distiller, both University of Otago graduates.

== Range ==
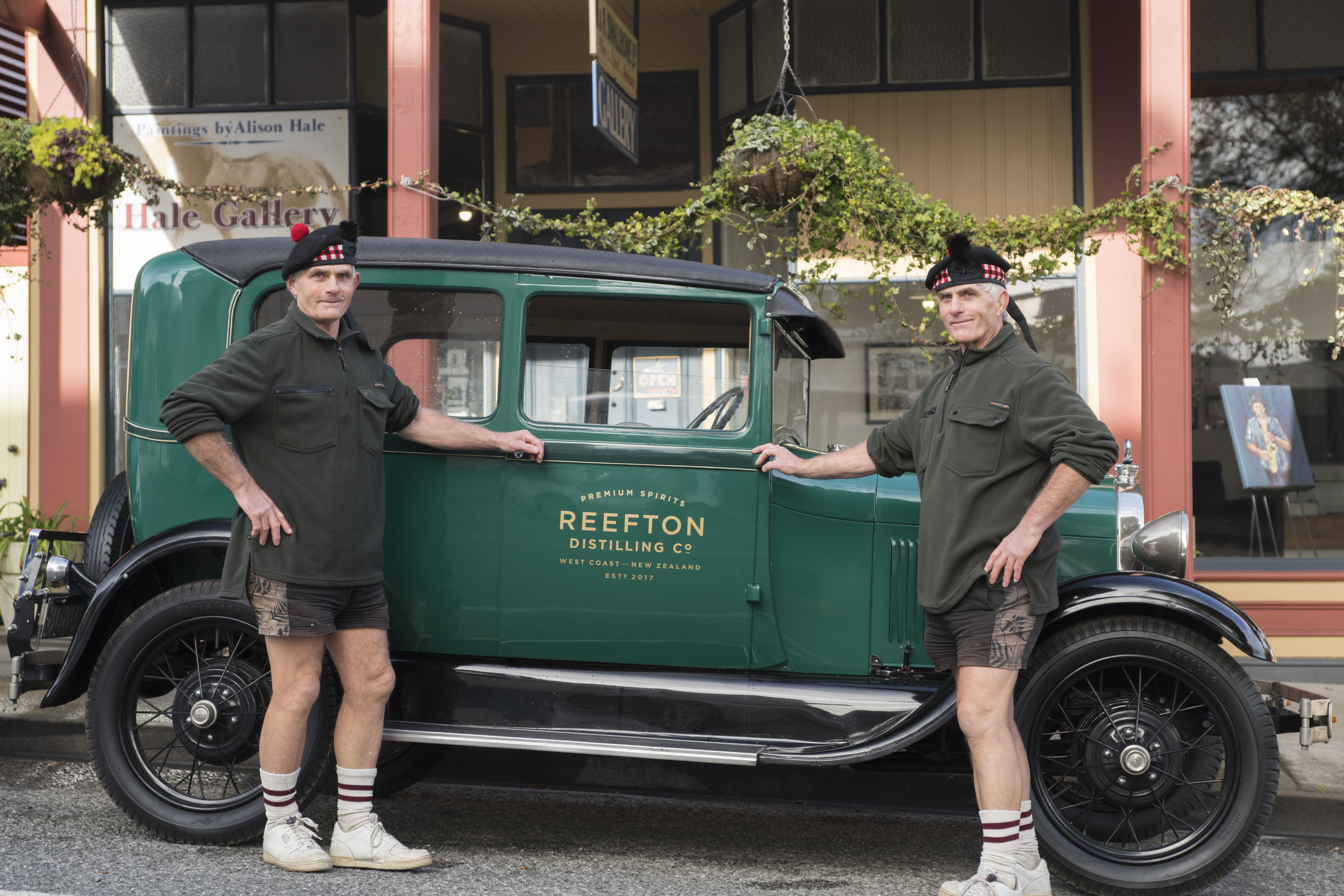
Steffan and Nigel MacKay

Reefton Distilling uses a 380-litre column still from Tasmania, and has an 1800-litre copper pot still for whisky production named "George", after the gold prospector George Fairweather Moonlight. The distillery's first range of gin was named Little Biddy, named after gold miner Bridget Goodwin, also known as Biddy of the Buller. They subsequently produced tayberry liqueur, blueberry liqueur, vodka, and a cask-aged Little Biddy gin.

Reefton twin brothers Nigel and Steffan MacKay are "distillery ambassadors", locating nearby pure water sources and foraging for botanicals to flavour the gin. Native plants used as botanicals include horopito, kahikatea, rimu, tarata, toatoa, and watercress.

In April 2020 during the coronavirus epidemic the distillery produced ethanol-based hand sanitiser.

== Expansion ==
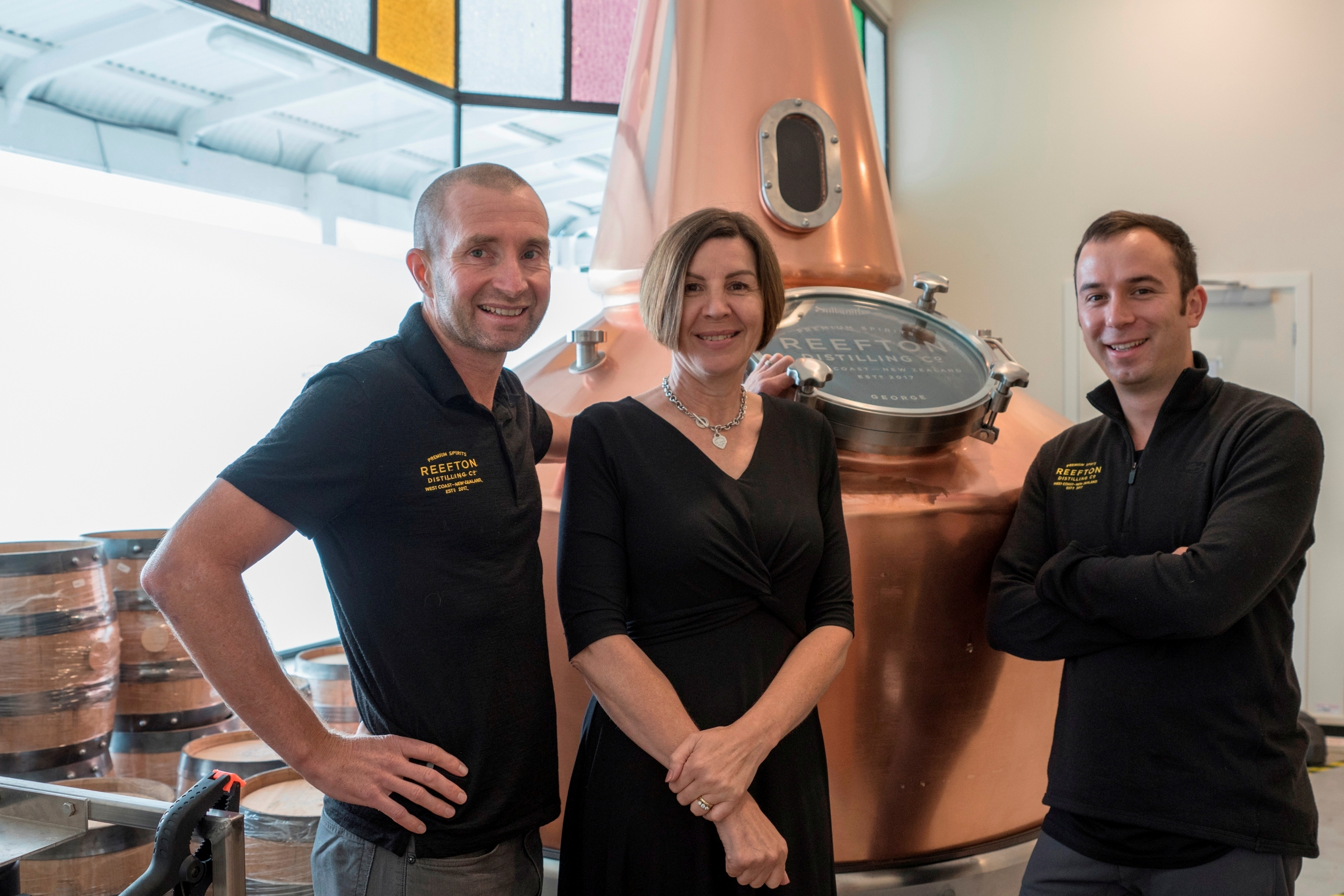
Shane Thrower, Patsy Bass, and Nick Secker. Behind them is "George", the 1800-litre copper pot still.

By 2020 Reefton Distilling Co. was outgrowing its initial Smith Street premises. In March the company raised $3.35 million in capital towards an expansion project and purchased a larger site on 1.1 ha of land and buildings on State Highway 69 between Reefton and Inangahua, 1.7 km from its Smith Street facility. The expanded premises was to include a whisky maturation store, enabling the production of a new single-malt whisky range named Moonlight Creek, using "George" the copper pot. On 25 September 2020 the distillery received a $938,000 loan from the Provincial Growth Fund towards the project, and relocation was expected to be completed in the first quarter of 2021, adding an additional seven or eight jobs. The first single malt whisky was expected to be available in 2023.

== Awards ==
- Little Biddy Gin – Classic won a gold medal at the July 10–18, 2020 SIP awards, a consumer-judging spirits competition.
- Little Biddy Gin and tayberry liqueur won silver medals and blueberry liqueur won bronze at the 2020 San Francisco World Spirits Competition.
- Reefton Distilling Co. won 15 awards at the San Francisco World Spirits Competition and the New Zealand Spirits Awards in 2019 and 2020.
