= Myra Cohen (dental assistant) =

New Zealand barber, dental assistant, entertainer, and milliner

Myra Cohen (12 May 1892 – 16 November 1959) was a New Zealand barber, dental assistant, entertainer and milliner. She was born in Reefton, West Coast, New Zealand on 12 May 1892.
