= Edward Smyrk =

New Zealand cricketer

Personal information
- Full name: Edward William Smyrk
- Born: 1 May 1882; Reefton, Inangahua County, New Zealand
- Died: 14 August 1962 (aged 80); Wairoa, Hawke's Bay, New Zealand
- Batting: Right-handed
- Bowling: Right-arm off-spin, leg-spin

Domestic team information
- Years: Team
- 1909-10 to 1912-13: Hawke's Bay
- 1913-14 to 1919-20: Wellington

Career statistics
Competition	First-class
Matches	7
Runs scored	117
Batting average	10.63
100s/50s	0/0
Top score	30
Balls bowled	580
Wickets	13
Bowling average	29.76
5 wickets in innings	0
10 wickets in match	0
Best bowling	4/45
Catches/stumpings	5/0
- Source: Cricinfo, 23 October 2020

Edward William Smyrk (1 May 1882 – 14 August 1962) was a New Zealand cricketer who played first-class cricket for Hawke's Bay and Wellington from 1910 to 1920.

Smyrk was a spin bowler, useful lower-order batsman and fine fieldsman. His best first-class bowling figures were 4 for 45 in his last match, for Wellington against Hawke's Bay in 1920.

Smyrk served as a sapper with the Samoa Expeditionary Force in the Occupation of German Samoa in 1914. He returned to New Zealand in March 1915 and married Jessie Arnold in Napier on 7 April.
