= Blacks Point Museum =

Museum in Blacks Point, New Zealand

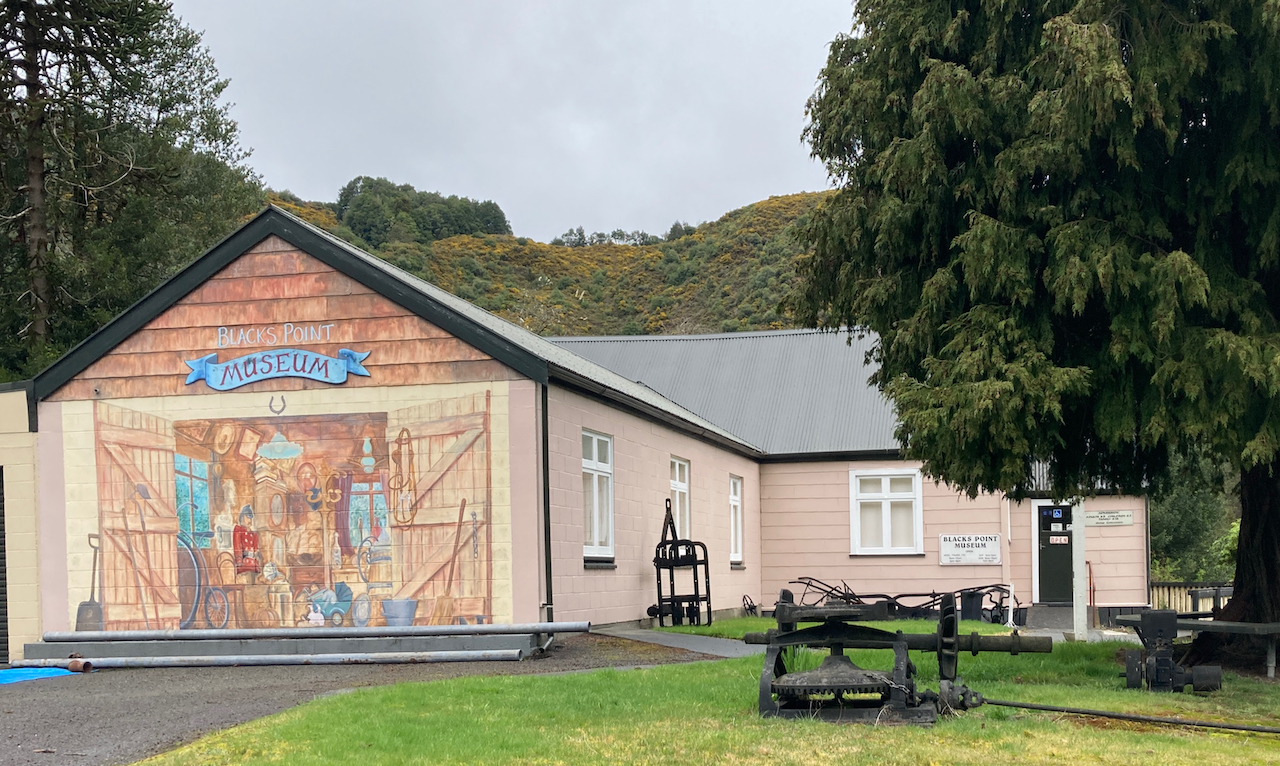
- Blacks Point museum, showing the mural by Alun Bollinger
- Former name: Methodist Church, Reefton
- Established: 1876 (church); 1 October 1966 (museum)
- Location: Blacks Point, near Reefton, South Island, New Zealand
- Coordinates: 42°7′53.7″S 171°52′55.9″E

Blacks Point Museum is a museum in Blacks Point, near Reefton on the West Coast of the South Island of New Zealand.

== Building ==
The museum building is a former Methodist/Wesleyan church, which was built from pit-sawn timber in 1876 and led as a non-denominational church by a Methodist minister. The church formerly overlooked the town, but 1912 it was moved back and rotated 90° on its section. As the population of Blacks Point declined, worship shifted to Reefton, and the church closed in 1960.

The church building was sold to the community for the purposes of a museum, and Blacks Point Museum opened on 1 October 1966. The building was extended in 1976, and the working Golden Fleece stamper installed in the 1980s. In 2008, a $135,000 purpose-built archive and research room was added. In 2009, a display building and lean-to was constructed, and in 2013 the museum building was re-roofed.

The exterior of the museum hosts a mural by cinematographer and local resident Alun Bollinger.

== Collection ==
The museum contains a collection of memorabilia relating to life in a mining town in New Zealand, including records from the school, the cemetery, genealogical material, a historical photograph collection, town directories, and a range of mining paraphernalia.

Next to the museum the still-functional Golden Fleece Battery, which was used by prospectors to crush quartz to extract gold. The battery is a water-driven stamper battery built and used in the 1870s.
