= Reefton Hospital =

Hospital in Reefton, New Zealand

Coordinates: 42.1191°S 171.8605°E

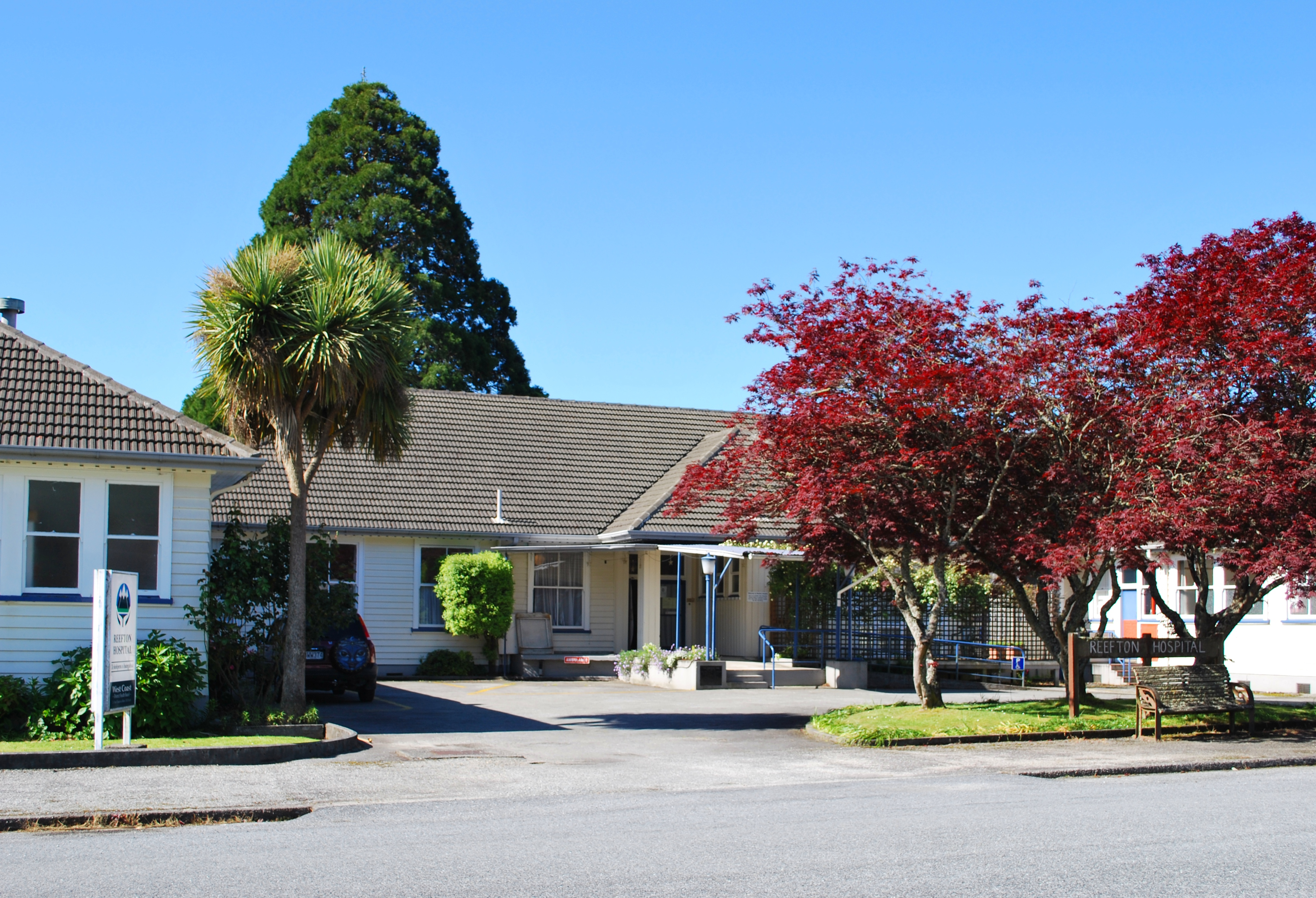
Reefton Hospital, Broadway, Reefton. 2011

Reefton Hospital is a hospital in Reefton on the West Coast of New Zealand. It was founded in 1872 and its closure was announced in 2024.

== History ==
Reefton Hospital was established in 1872 and still stands on its original site in Broadway, Reefton. In 1872 Reefton had at least eight doctors including Dr Joseph Lee. Lee was a surgeon who had set up his practice to treat the victims of mining accidents, and other patients. The community had begun efforts to improve the provision of health care in 1871 by forming a Sickness and Medical Aid Society. This was followed by a public meeting in 1872 at which it was decided to raise the necessary funds to build a hospital. Dr Lee was qualified to become the hospital's superintendent but the Hospital Committee appointed Dr Thomas Sanderson Bulmer of Wellington to the position. Later in 1872 Bulmer was charged with assaulting a fellow doctor, Joseph Currie, and was fined twenty shillings. In the following months Bulmer appeared in court several times on various matters including his suing a midwife over payment for his services.

During 1873 Bulmer's relationship with the Hospital Committee deteriorated due to several issues: supplying medicines to patients free of charge, lack of treatment of a patient in an emergency and sub-standard treatment of a miner with a broken leg. Bulmer resigned, the Hospital Committee advertised the job and invited him to apply. The Committee appointed Dr James from Ross. Bulmer left Reefton for Lyell but returned and was resident in Reefton until December 1876 when he left for Akaroa and later Melbourne. The medical superintendent from 1886 to 1902 was Dr Whitton; he was succeeded by Dr William Conlon in 1902. Conlon was medical superintendent of the hospital for 13 years and died in Reefton in 1936. In 1906 the hospital had four wards including one for women, one for contagious diseases and an operating theatre. One ward was funded by David Ziman, a local resident and head of the Consolidated Gold Mine Group.

The hospital treated accidents and diseases caused by mining. Records of the hospital show that patients were mainly miners of young to middle age who were treated for either injuries received in accidents or for phthisis (tuberculosis) caused by mining. In his evidence to the 1912 New Zealand Royal Commission on Mines Dr William Conlon noted that between 1899 and 1909 55 men on the Reefton gold field had died of miners' disease.

Jane Preshaw was matron of the hospital from 1876 to 1901.

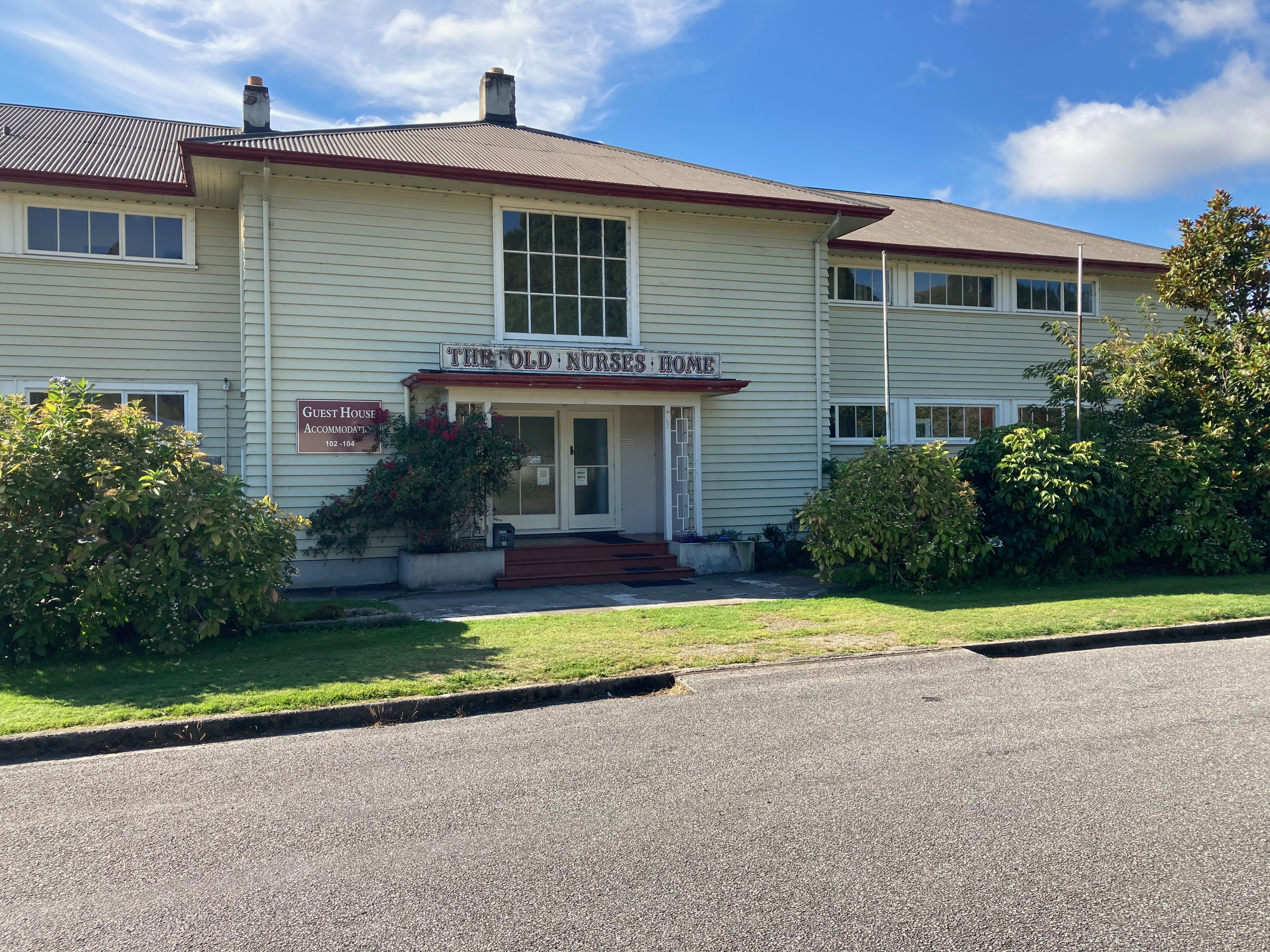
Old Nurses Home, Reefton. March 2021

A maternity ward was opened in 1929 and in the same year the buildings were badly damaged by the Murchison earthquake. In 1941 the Health Department recommended the closure of the hospital. A campaign began to build a modern hospital of 40 beds which would accommodate the elderly as well as separate accommodation for nurses and domestic staff. The Nurses Home building in Shiel St was opened in September 1949 by the Minister of Health, Mabel Howard. At the same time Howard laid the foundation stone for the new hospital and the plans for the new building allowed for nearly 60 patients. The first section of the new hospital was occupied in October 1952 and the second section was completed and opened by the Hon. C.F. Skinner in November 1953. An extension to the women's ward in 1957 allowed the hospital to have additional beds for children. The 1968 Inangahua earthquake caused only minor damage to the hospital and nurses home.

In 1968 the hospital became part of the West Coast Hospital Board which provided benefits in and access to specialist care that was not available in a small hospital. In September 1988 the Hospital Board decided to close the hospital. The community protested and saved it from closure.

In 2021 the hospital was part of the West Coast District Health Board which became Te Whatu Ora Te Tai o Poutini West Coast.

== Closure ==
In April 2024 Health New Zealand announced that the hospital/aged care facility would close permanently.
