= Guangxi Women's Battalion =

Women's battalion

- Active: 1938–1945
- Country: China
- Type: Women's unit
- Size: between 130 to 800
- Part of: National Revolutionary Army
- Garrison/HQ: Guilin
- Engagements: Second Sino-Japanese War

The Guangxi Women's Battalion was a women's unit in the National Revolutionary Army (the armed forces of the Republic of China) formed in 1938 in Guilin, Guangxi. It was one of several corps that were founded following an appeal by Soong Mei-ling for women to support the Sino-Japanese War effort in 1937. Similar units included: the Yunnan Women's Battlefield Service Unit, Zhejiang Women's Guerrilla Band, Hunan War Service Corps, and others.

In Guangxi, an initial appeal aimed to recruit 1200 students (both men and women), but over 18,000 initially signed up. Of these 4,269 were selected for service, and of the women chosen, most trained as combat medics with the Fifth Route Army. Reports on the size of the battalion vary from 130 students, to 500, to 800. The battalion fought in southern China.

According to anthropologist Elisabeth Croll, the Guangxi Women's Battalion was "the most famous of the girls' military units" in China.
