= Reefton =

Town in the South Island of New Zealand

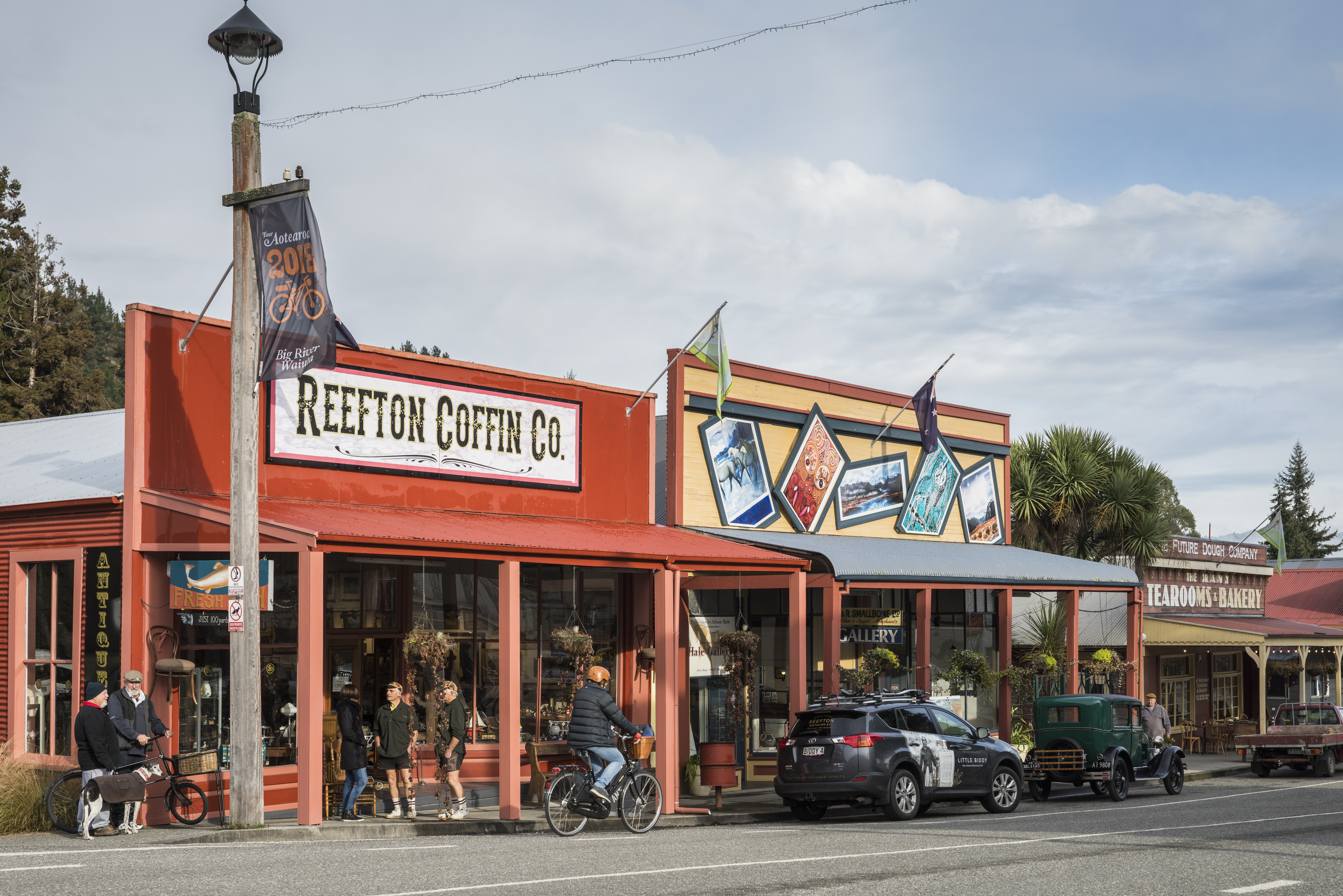
- Broadway
- Interactive map of Reefton
- Coordinates: 42°6′55″S 171°51′47″E
- Country: New Zealand
- Region: West Coast
- District: Buller District
- Ward: Inangahua Ward
- Community: Inangahua Community
- Electorates: West Coast-Tasman; Te Tai Tonga

Government
  - Territorial authority: Buller District Council
  - Regional council: West Coast Regional Council
  - Mayor of Buller: Chris Russell
  - West Coast-Tasman MP: Maureen Pugh
  - Te Tai Tonga MP: Tākuta Ferris

Area
  - Total: 2.63 km^{2} (1.02 sq mi)

Population (June 2025)
  - Total: 1,050
  - Density: 399/km^{2} (1,030/sq mi)

Reefton is a small town in the West Coast region of New Zealand, approximately 80 km (50 mi) northeast of Greymouth, in the Inangahua River valley. Ahaura is 44 km (27 mi) south-west of Reefton, Inangahua Junction is 34 km (21 mi) to the north, Maruia is 63 km (39 mi) to the east, and the Lewis Pass is 66 km (41 mi) to the south-east.

In 1888, it was the first town in New Zealand to be lit by electricity, generated by the Reefton Power Station. Reefton was a thriving gold mining town in the late 19th century, and gold mining lasted from the 1870s to the 1950s. Its economy is based on tourism, forestry, coal mining, and farming.

Reefton is home to the Inangahua County Library.

== Name ==
The rich veins of gold found in a quartz reef near the town led to its name, originally spelled "Reef Town". Two nicknames in use soon after it was founded were "Rest Town" and "Quartzopolis". The main street, Broadway, was named after West Coast magistrate Charles Broad. The nearby Wealth of Nations mine was named after Adam Smith's book because the gold been discovered by another Adam Smith (no relation).

== History ==
- 1866 – Alluvial gold discovered in the Īnangahua Valley
- 1870 – Quartz reefs discovered at Reefton
- 1872 – Reefton Hospital opened
- 1886 – Reefton School of Mines opened
- 1888 – Town electricity supply commenced
- 1892 – Railway line opened
- 1908 – Rail line to Cronadun opened
- 1912 – Mine workers locked out
- 1967 – Rail passenger services ceased

=== Gold mining ===
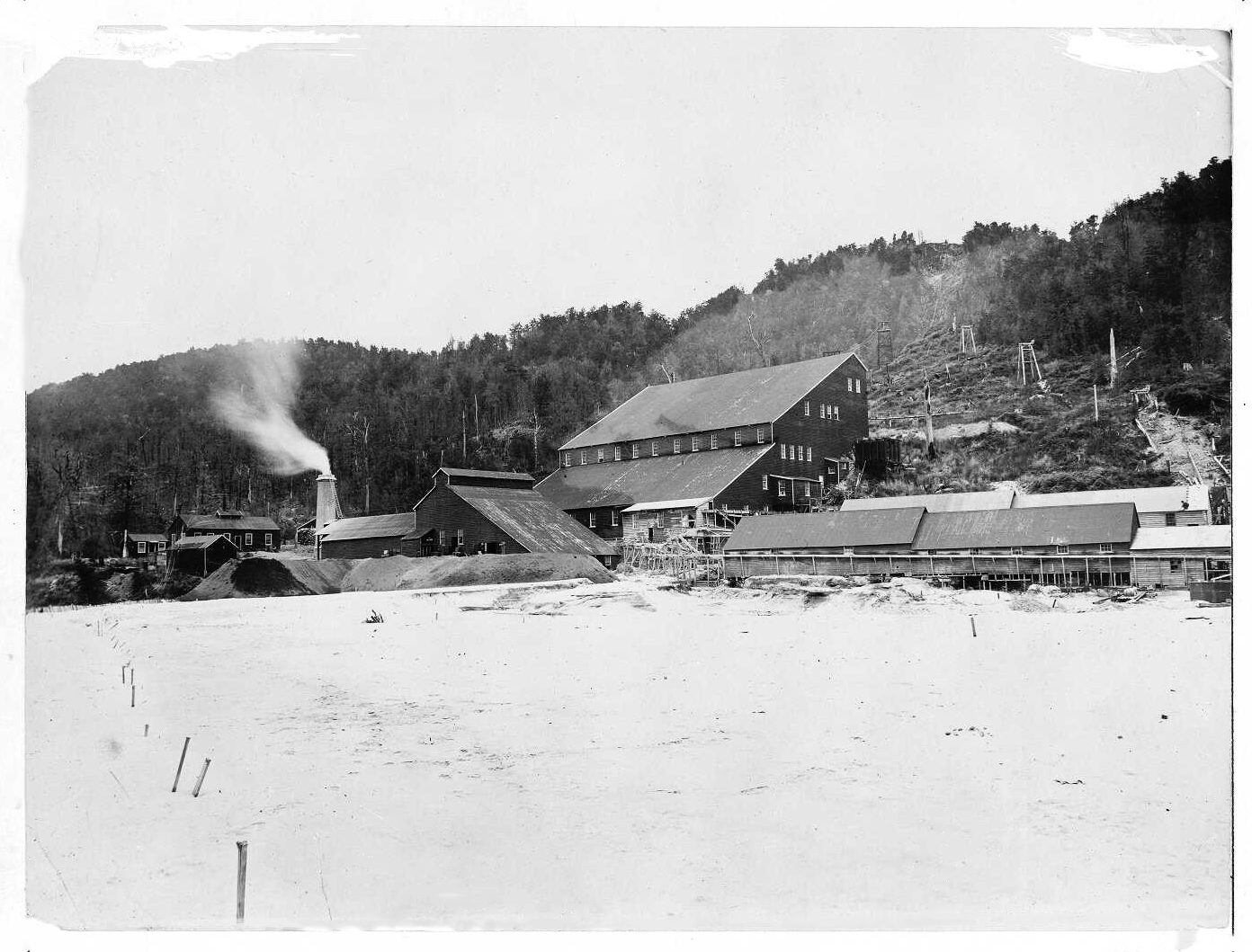
Crushington gold battery, 1890 (U.S. English, Stamp mill)

Alluvial gold was first discovered near the town in 1866; the major discovery of gold in quartz reefs was made in 1870 and gold was being extracted by 1872. Mining from quartz reefs only took place at Reefton and Lyell.

An earlier settlement, known as Ross Town, had been established on the opposite bank of the Inangahua River around 1870, but most businesses shifted across the river in 1871 to be nearer the quartz mining. There were mines at nearby locations such as Waiuta and Blacks Point.

There was a downturn in the industry in the 1880s due to lack of money to develop deeper mines. Consolidated Goldfields New Zealand formed in 1896 and ran several mines. Technology was modernised and the Reefton School of Mines opened in 1887 to apply more scientific knowledge to mining. Blackwater mine operated from 1908 until 1951, when a shaft collapsed. It reopened as Snowy River mine in December 2020 and employed 60 staff, who had dug 9 km (5.6 mi) of tunnels by 2024, with plans for further expansion. Globe Progress mine produced 610,000 ounces (17 t) of gold as an opencast pit from 2007 to 2016.

=== Electricity ===
In 1888 Reefton became the first town in New Zealand to receive electricity, the work of Walter Prince, and its streets were lit by commercial electricity generated by the Reefton Power Station. The power station was demolished in 1961 but the Reefton Power House Charitable Trust Inc has raised $4.5 million for a restructure project, and work started on buildings and a 1.8 kilometres (1.1 mi) water race in 2019. The power plant started again generating power in early 2026.

== Geography ==
=== Climate ===
Located in the Inangahua Valley at an altitude of 194m, Reefton falls under the Köppen-Geiger climate classification of Cfb (Oceanic), though the town's sheltered inland location lends its climate less maritime influence than coastal areas; as such, Reefton has recorded both the extreme highest temperature of 33.7 °C (92.7 °F) and the extreme lowest temperature of -8.5 °C (16.7 °F) in the West Coast region. At an average temperature of 17.4 °C (63.3 °F), February is the warmest month. July is the coldest month, at 5.4 °C (41.7 °F). Reefton's average annual temperature is 11.7 °C. Due to the town's inland location, summer afternoons are often considerably warmer in Reefton than coastal locations such as Greymouth or Westport, and it is not uncommon for winter mornings to be several degrees colder; nightly inversions of temperature are common due to the local geography, which encourages frequent periods of calm air. An average of 24 days per year will exceed 25 °C (77 °F); during an average winter, Reefton can expect to see 46 days of air frost and 61 days of ground frost. The Reefton area is the driest in the West Coast; this is largely due to the rain-shadow effect of the Paparoa Range. Snow can also fall on the town during winter, but not usually at sufficient levels to accumulate.

Climate data for Reefton (1991–2020 normals, extremes 1960–present)
Month	Jan	Feb	Mar	Apr	May	Jun	Jul	Aug	Sep	Oct	Nov	Dec	Year
Record high °C (°F)	33.7 (92.7)	33.5 (92.3)	30.1 (86.2)	25.6 (78.1)	22.1 (71.8)	19.0 (66.2)	18.9 (66.0)	19.4 (66.9)	24.8 (76.6)	26.2 (79.2)	30.9 (87.6)	32.2 (90.0)	33.7 (92.7)
Mean daily maximum °C (°F)	23.4 (74.1)	23.6 (74.5)	21.2 (70.2)	17.4 (63.3)	13.7 (56.7)	10.5 (50.9)	10.2 (50.4)	12.4 (54.3)	14.9 (58.8)	16.7 (62.1)	19.0 (66.2)	21.5 (70.7)	17.0 (62.7)
Daily mean °C (°F)	17.3 (63.1)	17.4 (63.3)	15.2 (59.4)	12.1 (53.8)	9.1 (48.4)	6.2 (43.2)	5.4 (41.7)	7.4 (45.3)	9.6 (49.3)	11.4 (52.5)	13.4 (56.1)	15.9 (60.6)	11.7 (53.1)
Mean daily minimum °C (°F)	11.2 (52.2)	11.2 (52.2)	9.2 (48.6)	6.9 (44.4)	4.5 (40.1)	2.0 (35.6)	0.7 (33.3)	2.3 (36.1)	4.3 (39.7)	6.1 (43.0)	7.8 (46.0)	10.3 (50.5)	6.4 (43.5)
Record low °C (°F)	0.7 (33.3)	0.5 (32.9)	−0.5 (31.1)	−3.5 (25.7)	−6.1 (21.0)	−8.0 (17.6)	−8.5 (16.7)	−7.0 (19.4)	−5.0 (23.0)	−3.9 (25.0)	−3.0 (26.6)	−0.1 (31.8)	−8.5 (16.7)
Average rainfall mm (inches)	138.6 (5.46)	101.8 (4.01)	108.6 (4.28)	143.0 (5.63)	170.8 (6.72)	189.7 (7.47)	161.8 (6.37)	179.1 (7.05)	176.6 (6.95)	182.1 (7.17)	149.7 (5.89)	162.4 (6.39)	1,864.2 (73.39)
Mean monthly sunshine hours	223.3	195.1	174.9	129.4	89.6	70.7	90.8	113.8	147.6	157.2	197.9	204.9	1,795.2
Source: NIWA

== Demographics ==
Reefton is described as a small urban area by Stats NZ, which covers 2.63 km^{2} (1.02 sq mi). It had an estimated population of 1,050 as of June 2025, with a population density of 399 people per km^{2}.

Population of Reefton
Year	Pop.	±% p.a.
1996	1,044	—
2001	987	−1.12%
2006	981	−0.12%
2013	1,056	+1.06%
2018	927	−2.57%
2023	1,026	+2.05%
Population counts from the New Zealand census. Populations before 2006 may use slightly different boundaries.

Reefton had a population of 1,026 in the 2023 New Zealand census, an increase of 99 people (10.7%) since the 2018 census, and a decrease of 30 people (−2.8%) since the 2013 census. There were 531 males, 489 females, and 3 people of other genders in 513 dwellings. 2.0% of people identified as LGBTIQ+. The median age was 54.0 years (compared with 38.1 years nationally). There were 141 people (13.7%) aged under 15 years, 111 (10.8%) aged 15 to 29, 495 (48.2%) aged 30 to 64, and 276 (26.9%) aged 65 or older.

People could identify as more than one ethnicity. The results were 87.1% European (Pākehā), 14.6% Māori, 1.5% Pasifika, 3.5% Asian, and 7.0% other, which includes people giving their ethnicity as "New Zealander". English was spoken by 98.5%, Māori by 2.9%, and other languages by 5.6%. No language could be spoken by 0.9% (e.g. too young to talk). New Zealand Sign Language was known by 0.3%. The percentage of people born overseas was 14.3, compared with 28.8% nationally.

Religious affiliations were 28.7% Christian, 0.3% Hindu, 0.6% Islam, 0.6% Māori religious beliefs, 0.3% Buddhist, 0.6% New Age, 0.3% Jewish, and 1.8% other religions. People who answered that they had no religion were 56.1%, and 10.5% of people did not answer the census question.

Of those at least 15 years old, 102 (11.5%) people had a bachelor's or higher degree, 471 (53.2%) had a post-high school certificate or diploma, and 312 (35.3%) people exclusively held high school qualifications. The median income was $29,400, compared with $41,500 nationally. 54 people (6.1%) earned over $100,000 compared to 12.1% nationally. The employment status of those at least 15 was 354 (40.0%) full-time, 129 (14.6%) part-time, and 33 (3.7%) unemployed.

== Economy ==
Gold mining recommenced in 2007 when Oceana Gold opened a new mine. In 2013 it employed 260 people. The mine closed in 2016 and Oceana Gold has undertaken an environmental rehabilitation programme at the site.

A new gold mine is planned to open in 2024, it is expected to employ 100 people.

Other industries in the town are coal mining, forestry, tourism and servicing the farming industry.

== Transport ==
Reefton is located at the intersection of State Highway 7 and State Highway 69.

=== Rail ===
Reefton is located on the Stillwater–Westport Line railway, which diverges from the Midland Line in Stillwater. On 29 February 1892, the line was opened to Reefton, but it terminated on the southern bank of the Inangahua River opposite the town. Early in the 20th century, a bridge was built across the river and the present-day station established in Reefton. The line was opened beyond Reefton to Cronadun in 1908, but it was not until 5 December 1943 that the line officially became a through route to Westport, though trains had been operating the length of the line since July 1942. On 3 August 1936, a railcar passenger service began operating in the morning between Hokitika and Reefton utilising small Leyland diesel railcars, but low patronage meant this service ceased to operate all the way to Reefton in August 1938. In the early 1940s, much larger Vulcan railcars were introduced to New Zealand and they provided two services to Reefton: one local service from Greymouth that terminated in Reefton, and a service that ran between Westport and Stillwater to connect with the West Coast Express. In 1967, all passenger services through Reefton ceased. Today, the primary traffic on the railway is coal, with multiple coal trains operating daily.

== Education ==
The first state school in Reefton was founded in 1878, and there were once 24 schools in the area.

Reefton Area School is a composite (years 1–13) school with a roll of 175 as of July 2026. It was formed by the merger of Reefton School and Inangahua College (earlier called Reefton District High School) in 2004.

Sacred Heart School is a full primary (years 1–8) school with a roll of 21. It is a state integrated Catholic school. It was open by 1884. An earlier Catholic school in Reefton provided education to all students from 1875.

Both schools are coeducational.

== Broadcast and print media ==
The first newspaper to be printed in Reefton was the Inangahua Herald and New Zealand Miner, which began as a twice-weekly paper in February 1872, its joint owner being Joseph Ivess, who went on to found many other newspapers. It was appearing three times a week by 1874 and became a daily in 1894. Its owner and editor from 1909 was Maud L. G. Beresford Wilkinson.

Its main rival, the Inangahua Times, was established by William Joseph Potts in 1875. Potts was editor of Ahaura's Grey Valley Times in 1873, and in 1874 he started the short-lived Reefton Courier and Inangahua Advertiser which survived only to the end of the year, and was the predecessor of the Times. The Times initially appeared three times a week, but by 1891 was a daily. Potts owned the Times until his death in 1901, and his wife Mary Potts was editor from 1897 to 1905.

For a short time Reefton, with a population of just 2000 and a circulation area of 4648, was home to three competing daily papers: the third, the Reefton Guardian, was first published in 1888, and was bought out by the Inangahua Times in 1894. All three papers were served for more than fifty years by the compositor, editor, and publisher James Noble, who started at the Guardian and eventually became editor and publisher of the Times. The Herald succumbed to the Depression in 1936 and merged with the Times in 1936. After James Noble the Times was run by Ernest Nicholson until it ceased publication on 6 June 1942, a casualty of war shortages. It was revived in 1946 by Reefton's Presbyterian minister Rev. C. R. (Bob) Sprackett as the Inangahua-Murchison Times, printed in Greymouth, which survived as a weekly until 1956.

Locally received radio stations include repeaters of both The Hits from Greymouth and Coast FM from Westport. The Greymouth Star newspaper is also received daily in the town.

== Notable people ==
- Marty Banks – rugby union player, born and grew up in Reefton
- Amy Castle – museum curator and entomologist, born in Reefton
- Myra Cohen – barber, dental assistant, entertainer and milliner
- Elisabeth Croll – anthropologist, born in Reefton
- Patrick Stanley Vaughan Heenan, traitor who was born in Reefton in 1910, shot in Singapore in 1942
- Phill Jones – basketball player, grew up in Reefton
- Melanie Nolan – labour and gender historian, born in Reefton
- Edward Smyrk – cricketer, born in Reefton

== Gallery ==
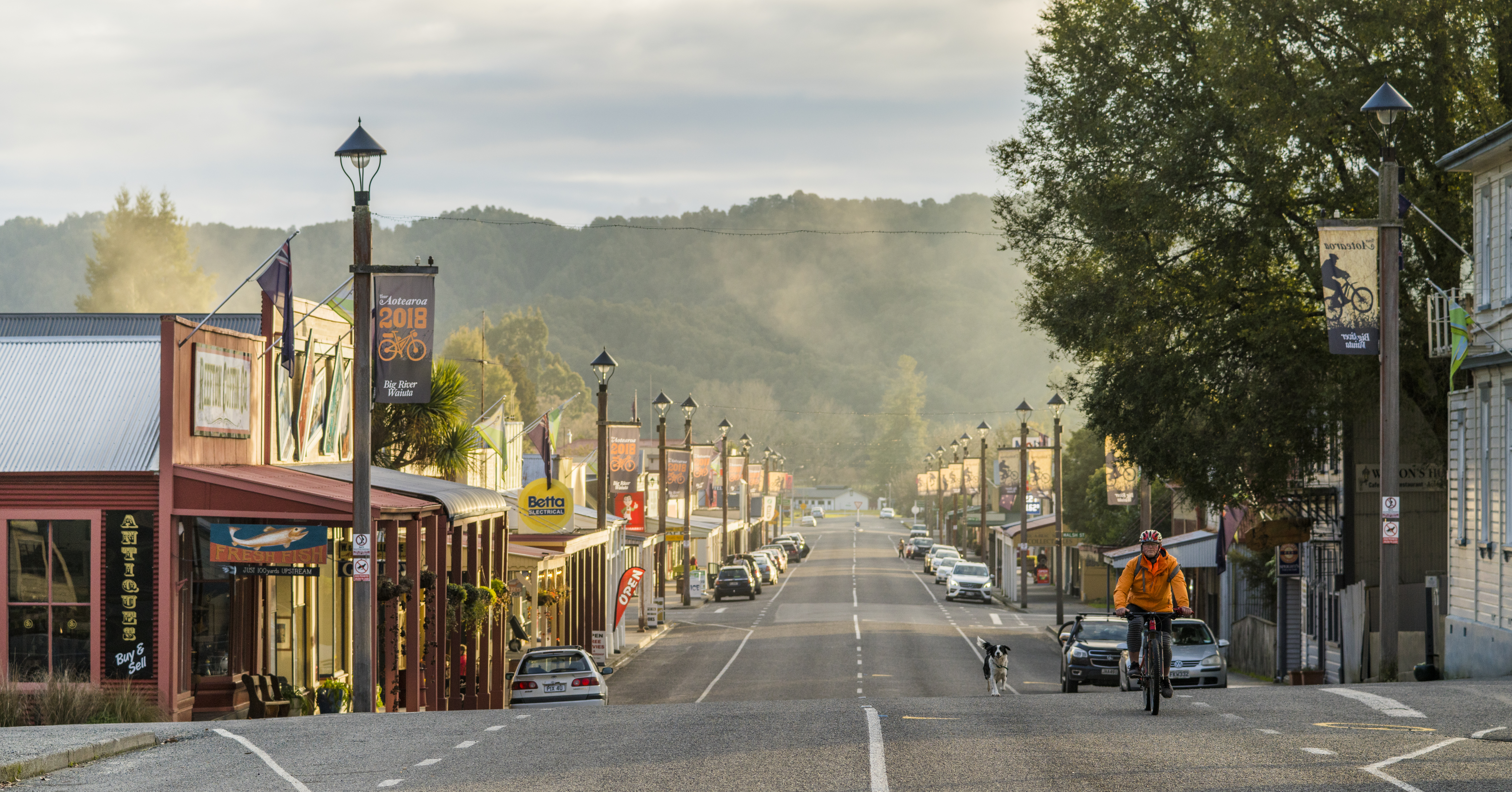
Broadway

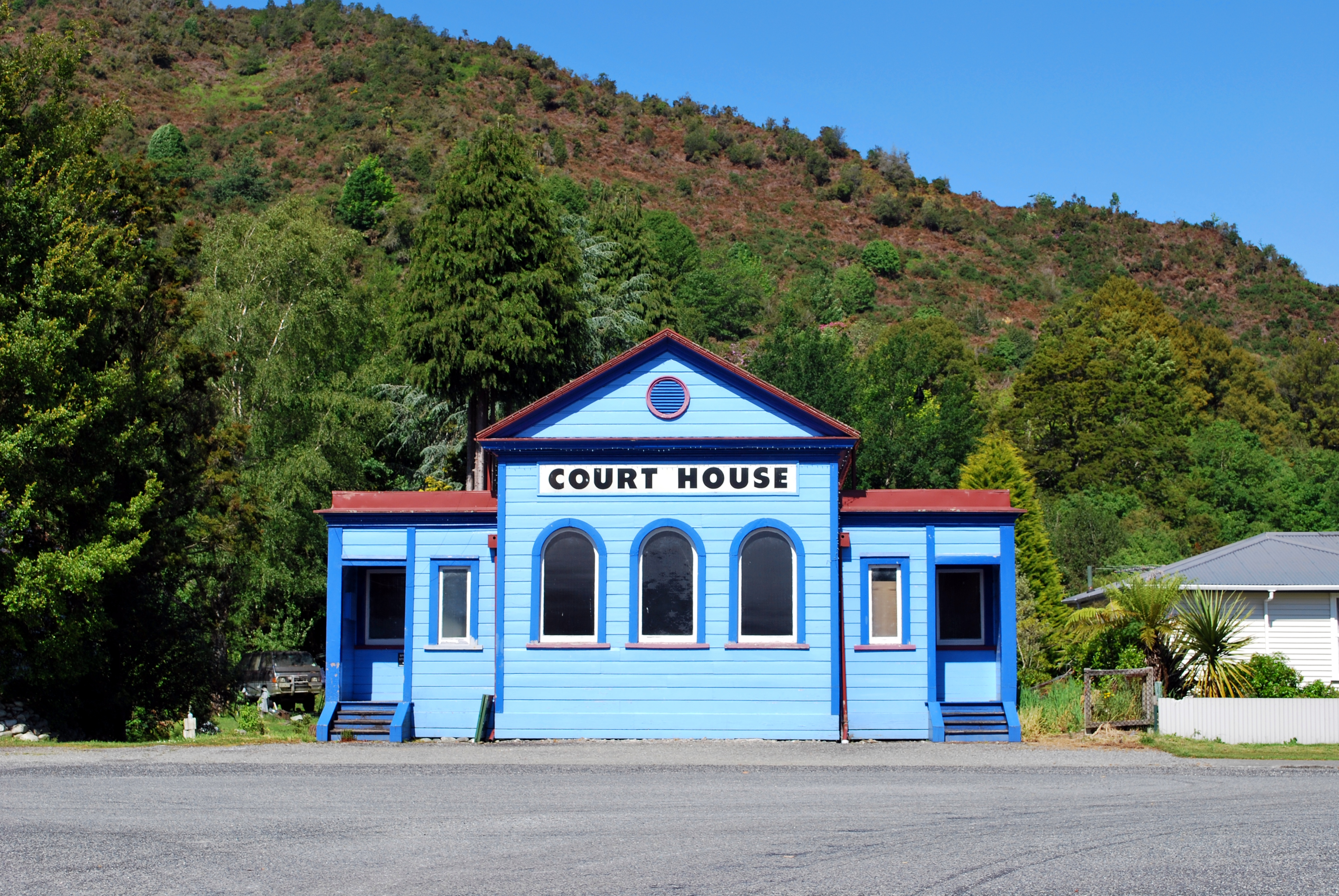
Reefton Court House

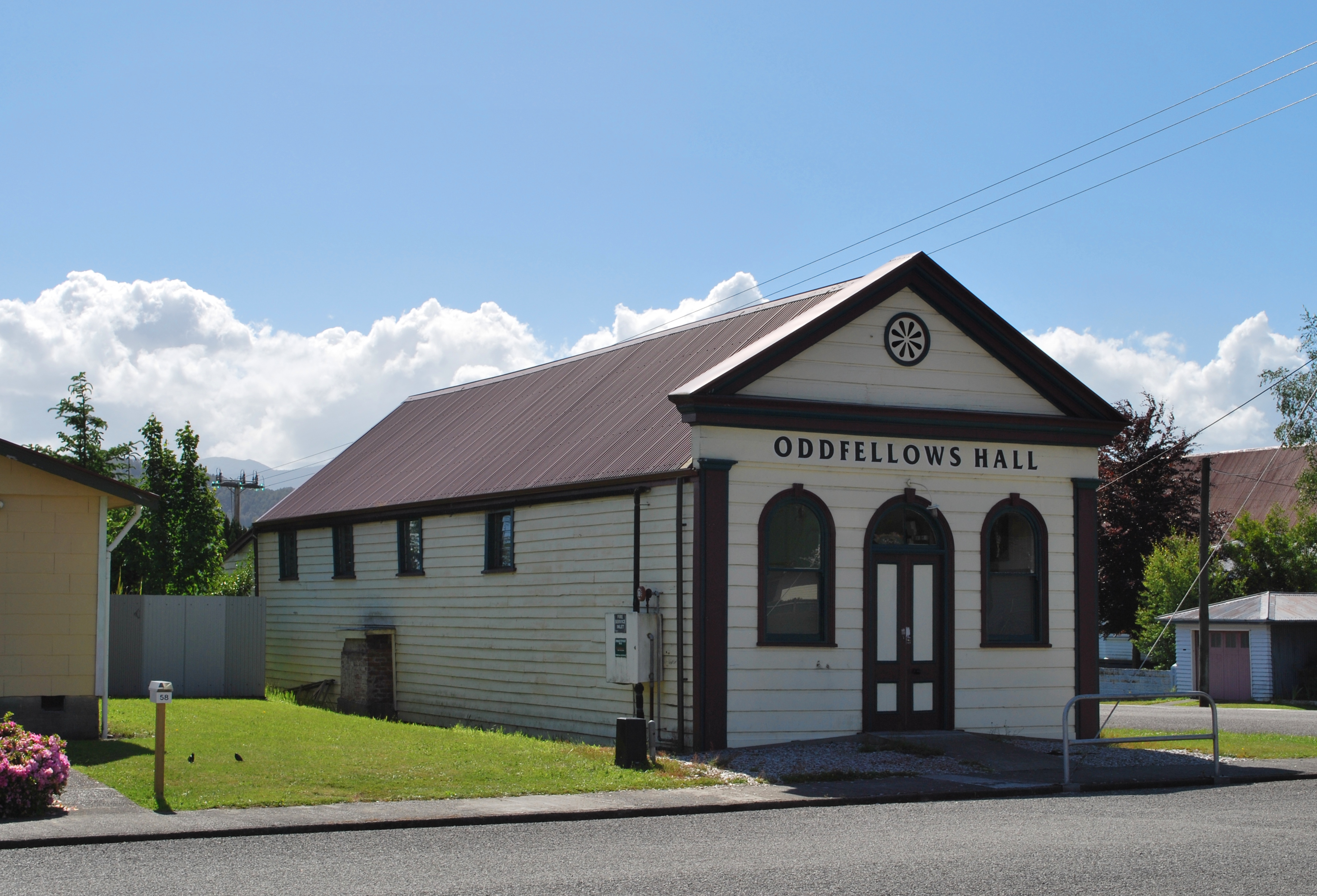
Reefton Oddfellows Hall

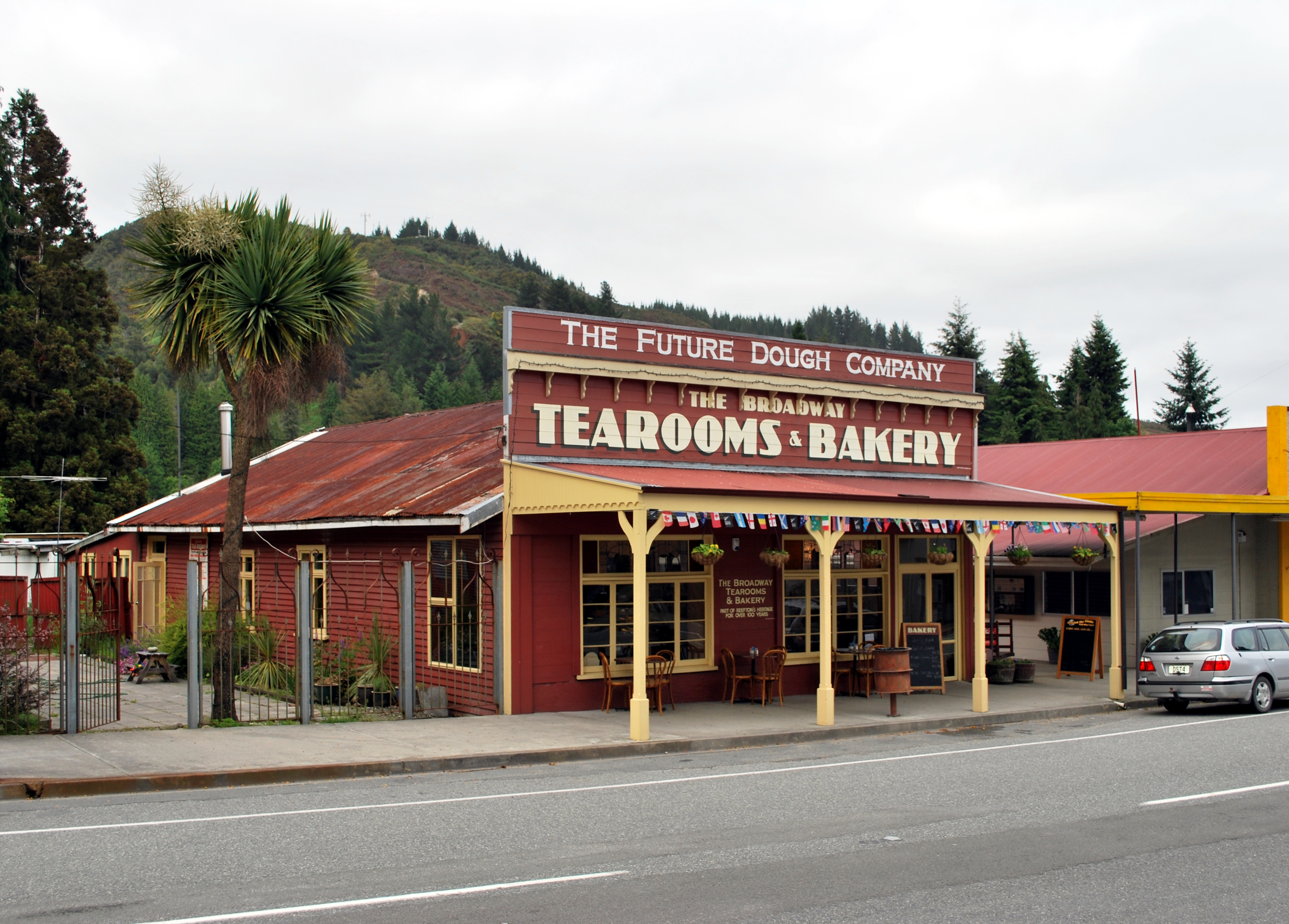
Broadway Tearooms & Bakery

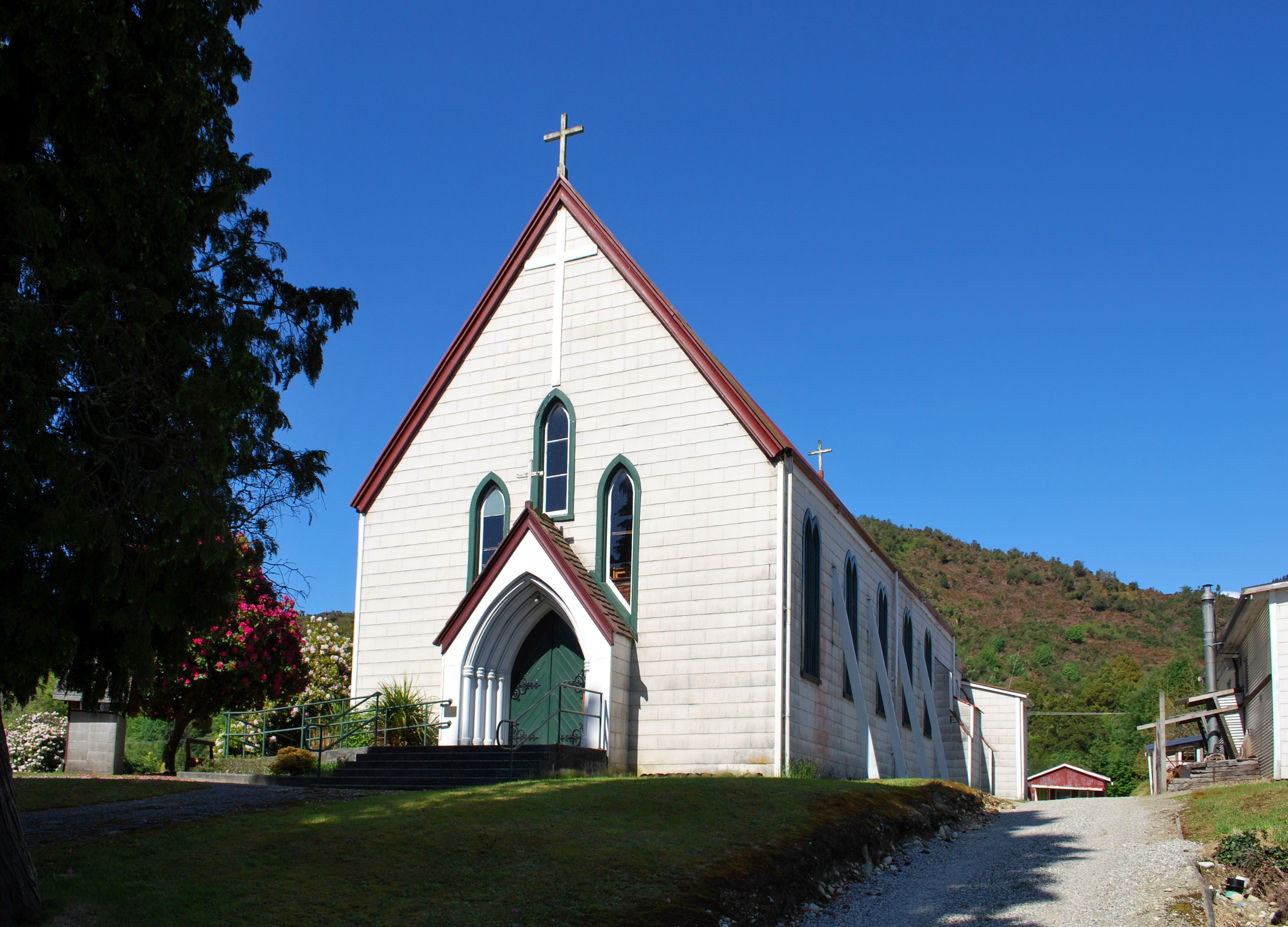
Reefton Roman Catholic Church

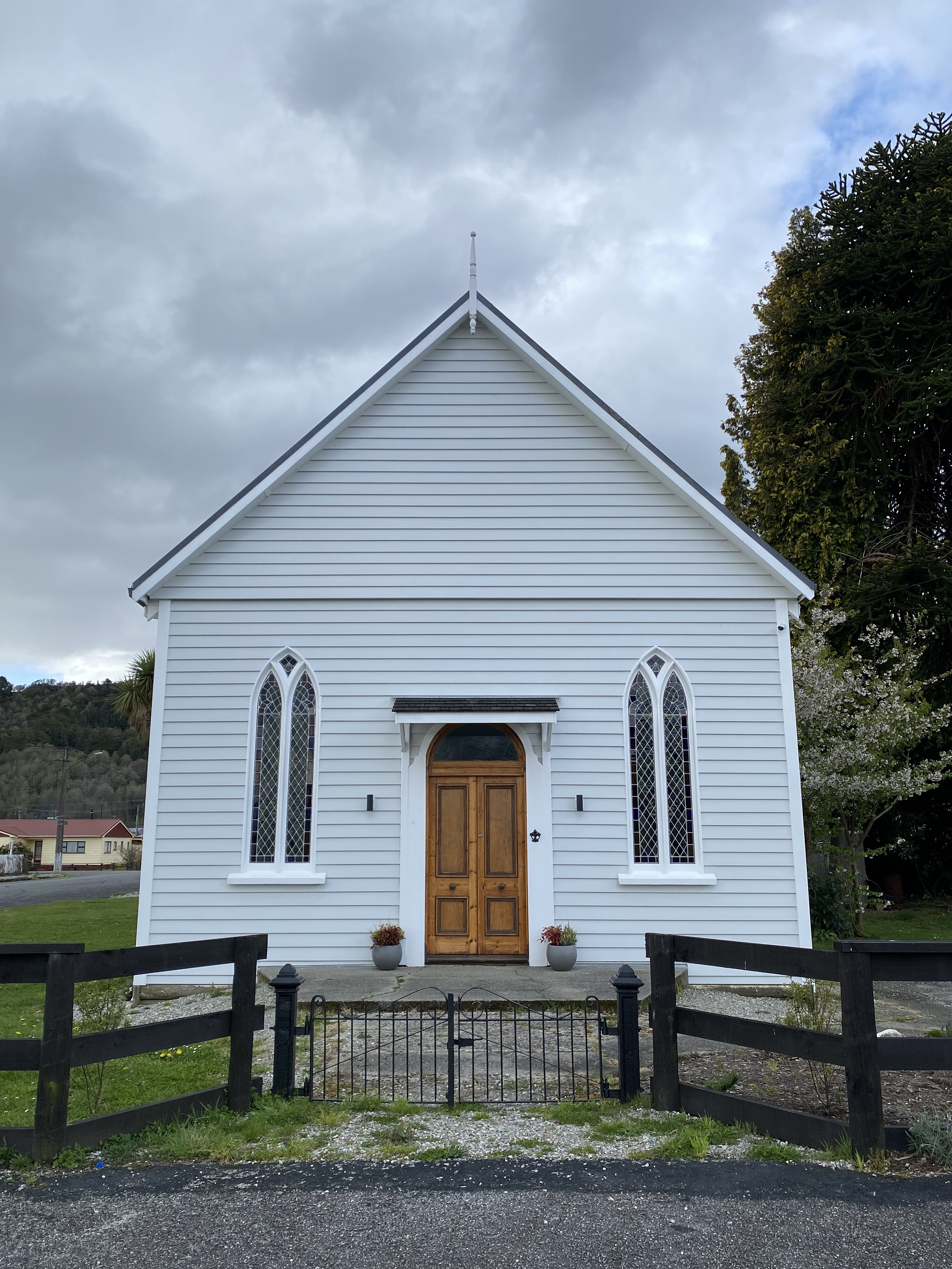
Old Knox Church

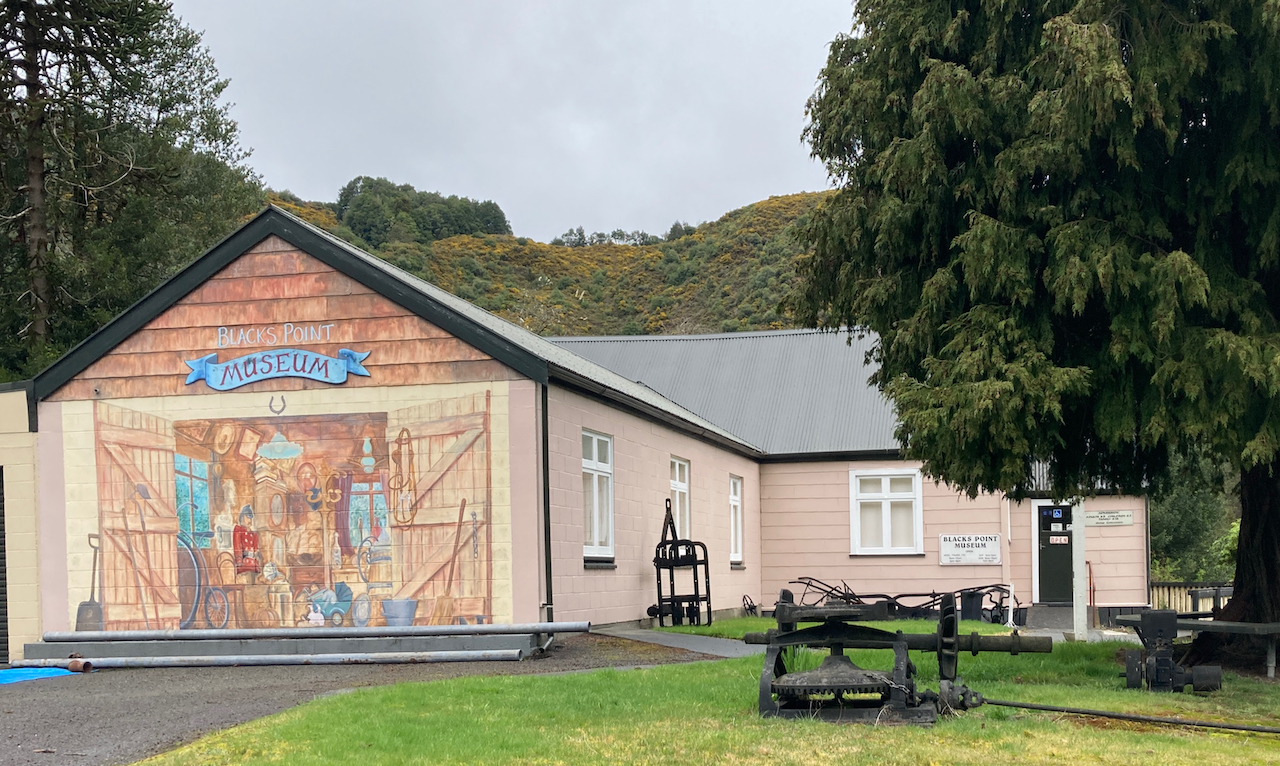
Blacks Point Museum

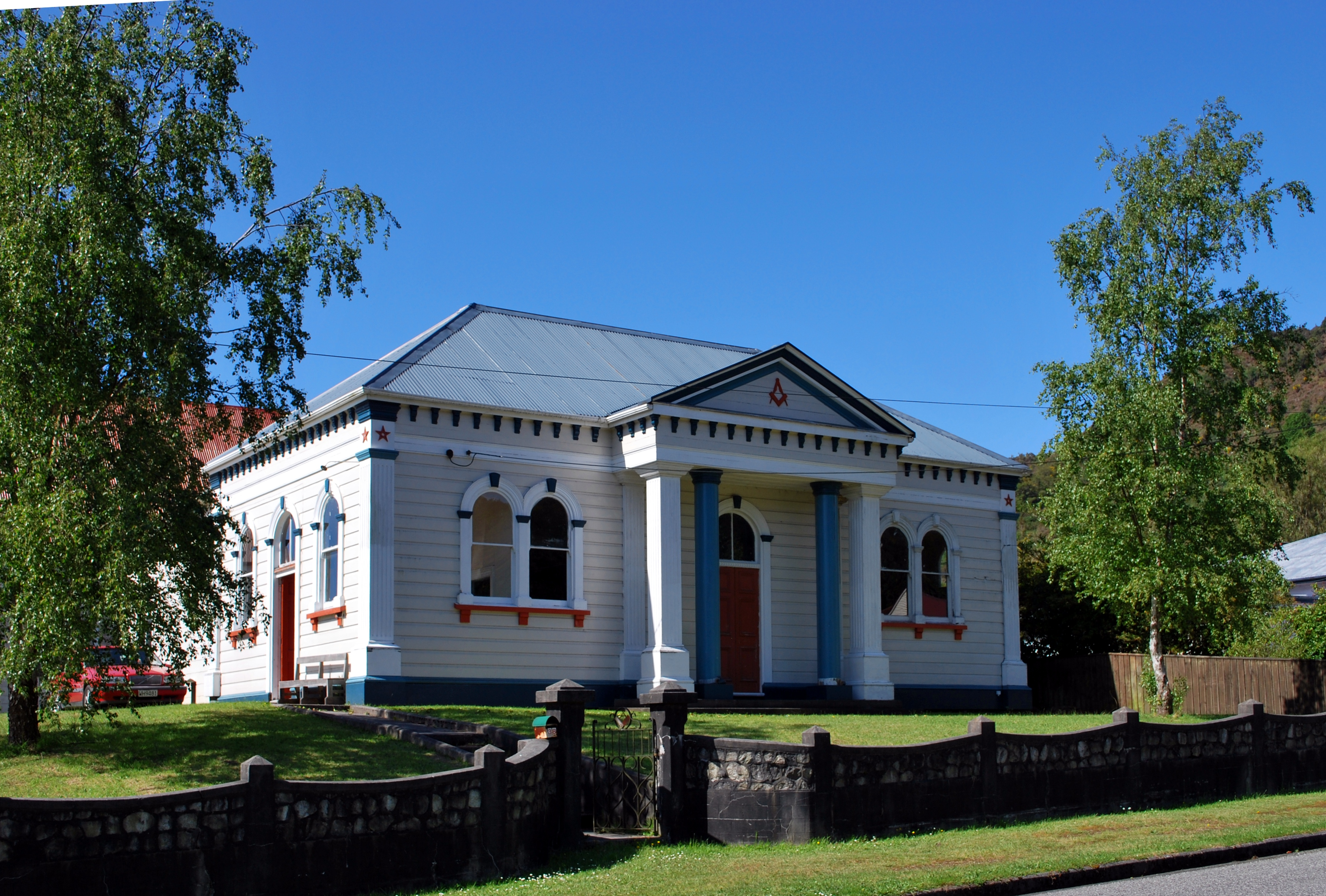
Reefton Masonic building

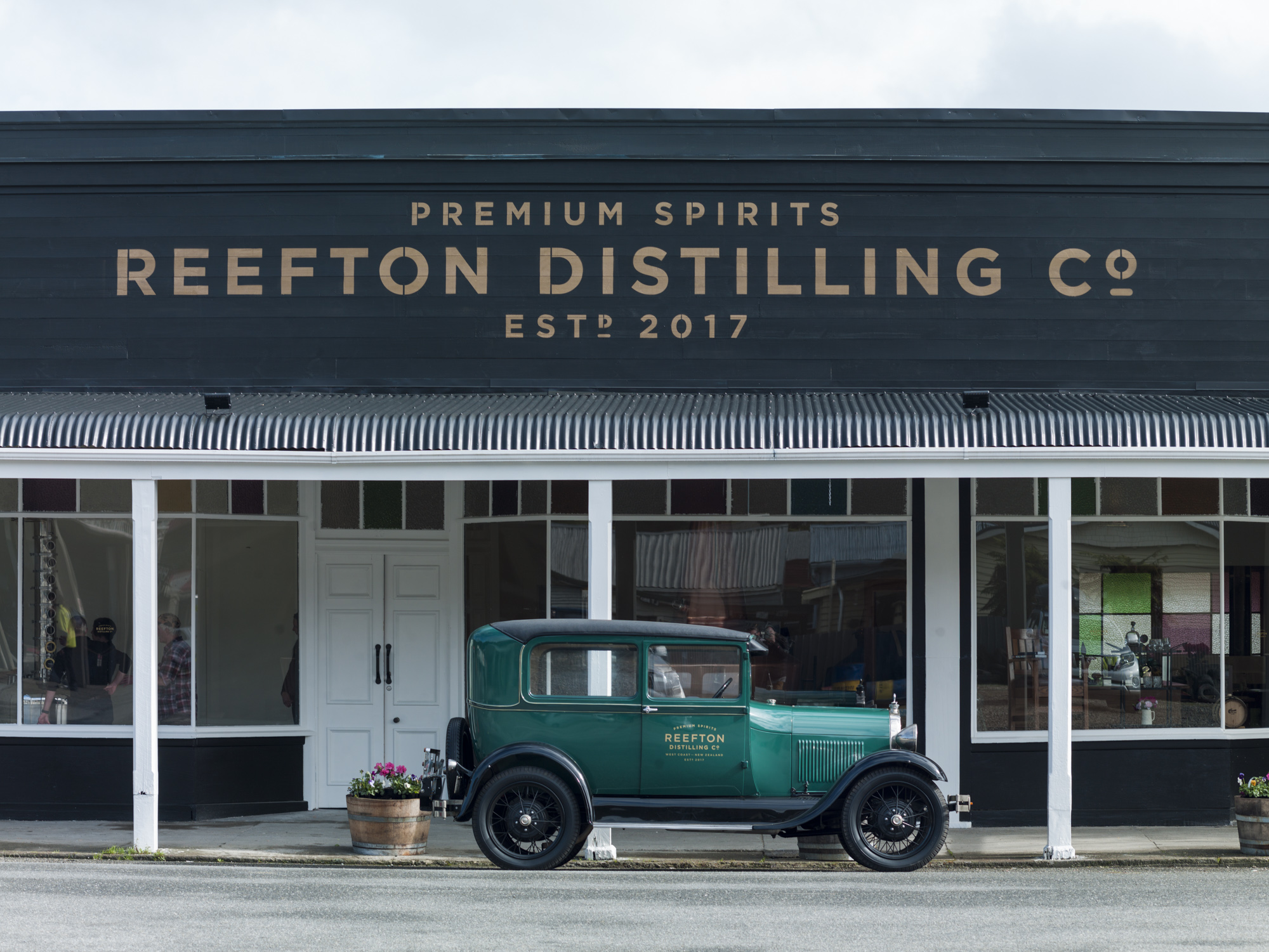
Reefton Distilling Co.

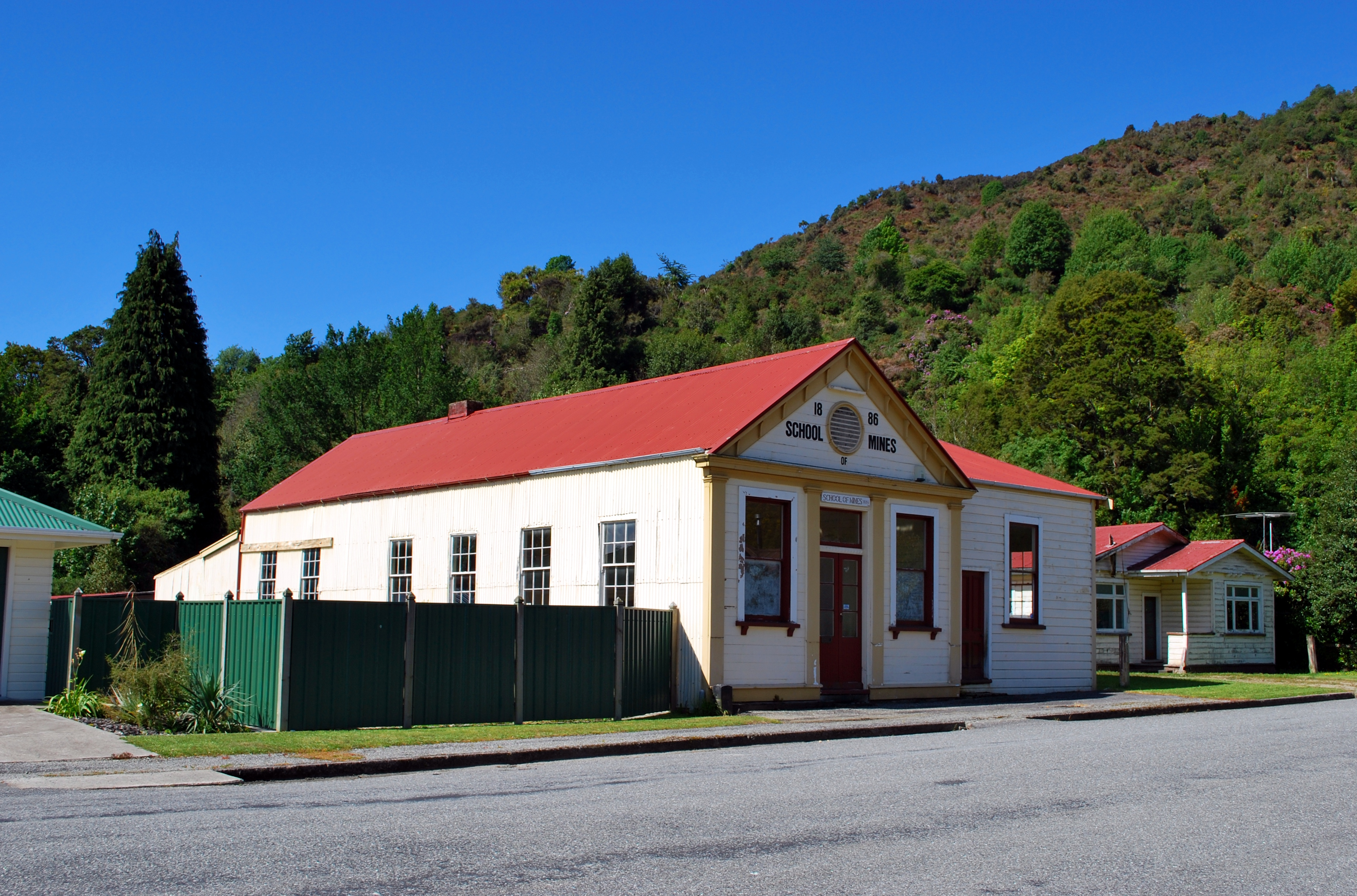
Reefton School of Mines
Reefton Oddfellows Hall

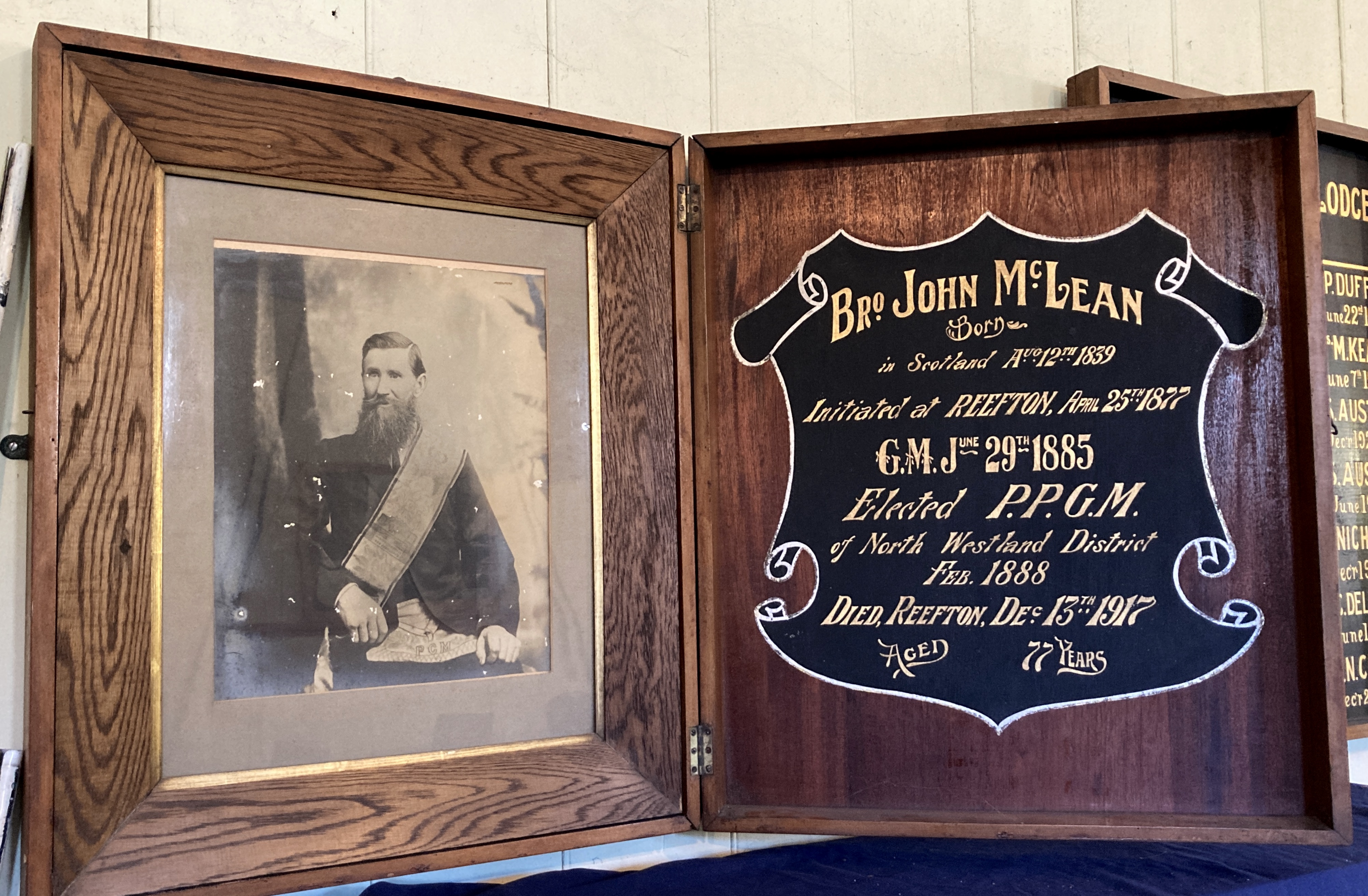

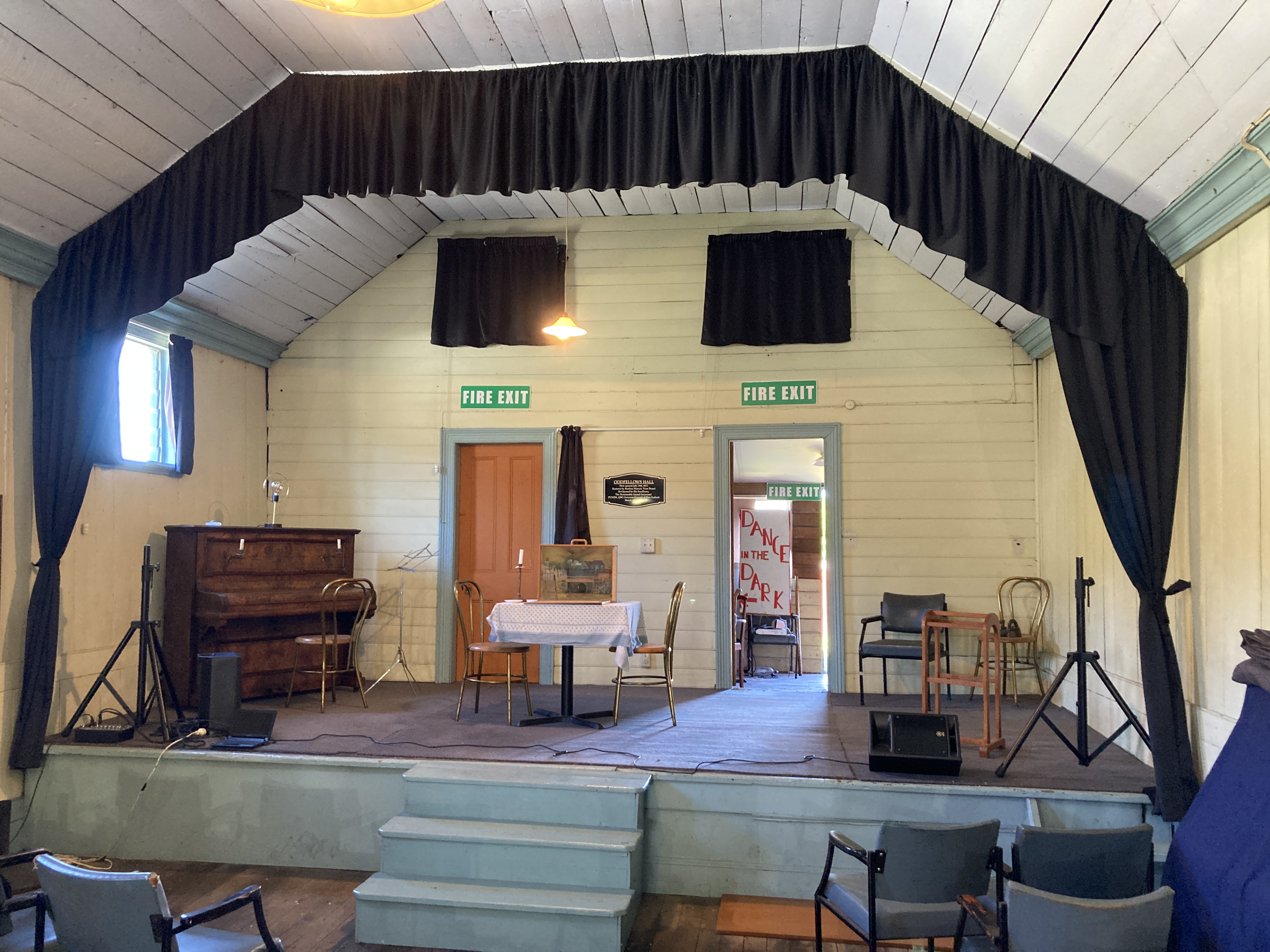

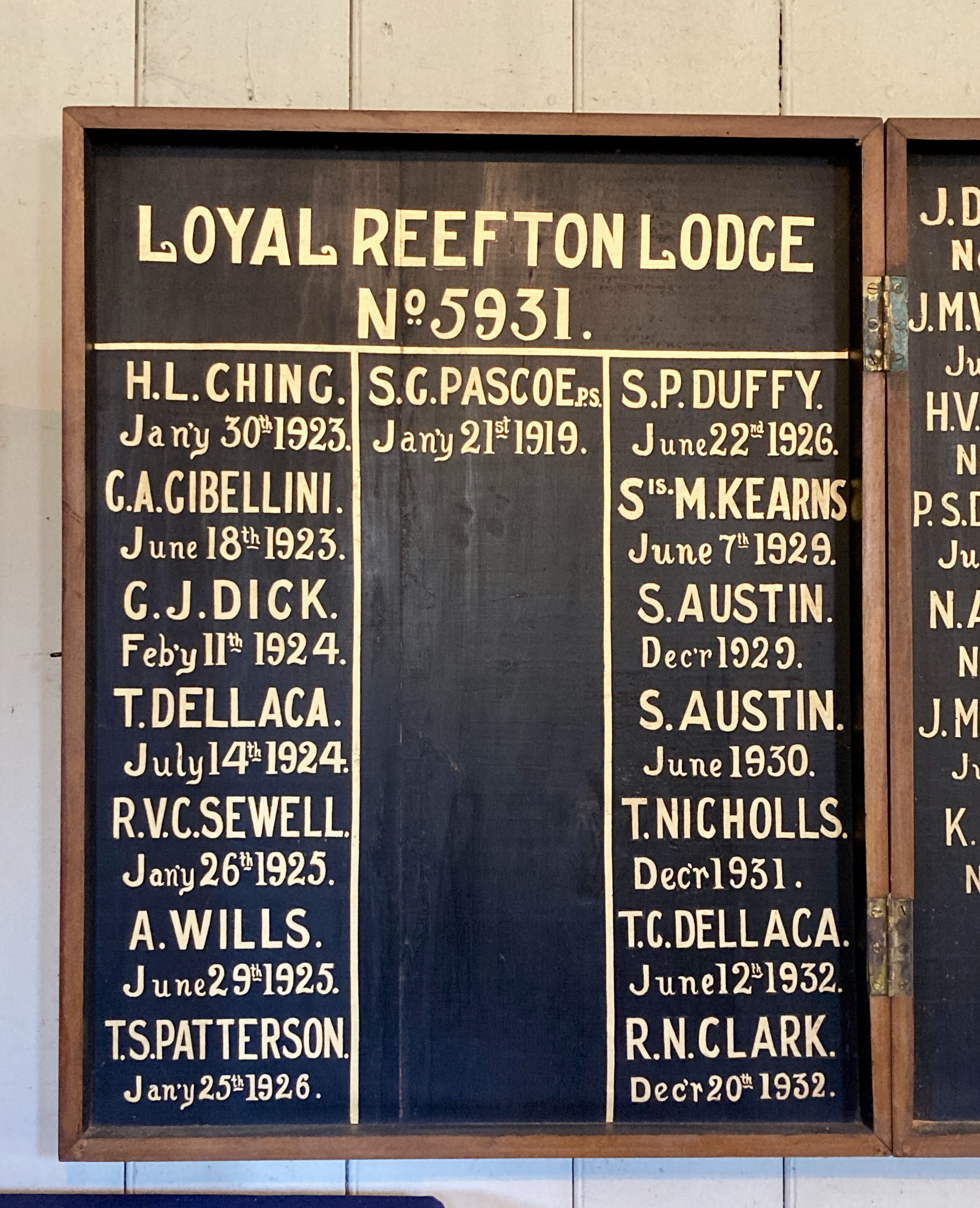
Roll of members
