= 1962 Timaru by-election =

New Zealand by-election

← 1960 general	21 July 1962	1963 general →
- Turnout: 14,455 (83.79%)
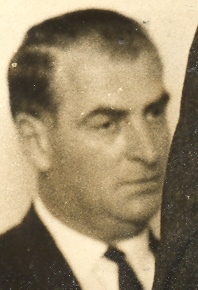

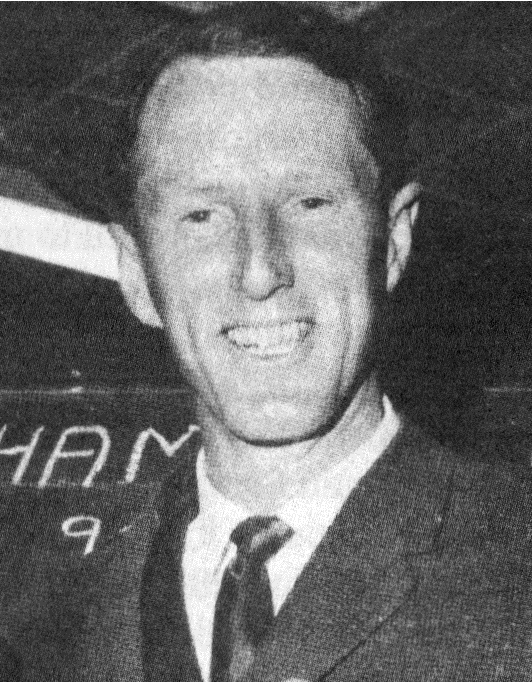
Candidate	Sir Basil Arthur	Derek Quigley
Party	Labour	National
Popular vote	7,578	6,271
Percentage	52.55	43.49
Member before election
Clyde Carr
Labour
Elected Member
Sir Basil Arthur
Labour

The Timaru by-election 1962 was a by-election held in the Timaru electorate in Canterbury during the term of the 33rd New Zealand Parliament, on 21 July 1962.

== Background ==
The by-election was caused by the resignation of incumbent MP Rev Clyde Carr of the Labour Party on 31 May 1962. Carr, who died on 18 September, had often been opposed to the party leaders.

== Candidates ==
=== Labour ===
There were several names put forward for the Labour Party candidacy:

- Sir Basil Arthur, Labour's candidate for Hamilton in 1960 and the recent Waitaki by-election
- Neville Pickering, the former MP for St Albans
- Gordon Ray, the President of the Timaru Labour Representations Committee
- Patrick Herman Weith, the President of the South Island Waterside Workers' Federation

Arthur was chosen after winning a ballot at a meeting of local party members.

=== National ===
Five people sought the National Party candidature, only one of whom was actually living in Timaru.

- Norman Stanley Brown, a farmer of Pleasant Point and past president of the Waimate branch of Federated Farmers who was a nominee for the National nomination at the recent Waitaki by-election
- Thomas Graham Scarf, a manufacturer from Waikanae
- Derek Quigley, a farmer at Waipara who was National's candidate for Sydenham in 1960
- Maurice John O'Reilly, an insurance agent and law student at Otago University
- Pearl Savin, the women's editor of the Timaru Herald

Quigley was chosen as the National candidate after winning a ballot at a meeting of local party members.

=== Social Credit ===
The Social Credit Party chose Maurice John Hayes as their candidate.

== Result ==
Within the town of Timaru, there were polling booths in Caroline Bay, Church Street, Church Street West, College Road, Elizabeth Street, Evans Street, Grants Road, Grey Road, Courthouse, Kensington Methodist Hall, Watlington Sunday School, Queen Street, Seddon Street, Selwyn Street, Trafalgar Street, Wai-iti Road, and Woodlands Street. Outside of Timaru, there were polling booths in Claremont, Fairview, Gleniti, Kerrytown, Kingsdown, Levels, Otipua, Pareora, Rosewill, Salisbury, Seadown, and Washdyke. (Note: Some of the places listed as outside of Timaru are today regarded as suburbs of the town.)

The by-election was won by Sir Basil Arthur, also of the Labour Party. Even on the provisional result, with over 1,400 special votes yet to be counted published on 22 July (the day after polling day), it was clear that Arthur had won by a considerable margin. Overseas votes were allowed to be received until 31 July by the returning officer, P. W. J. Cockerill. There were 1206 special and overseas votes that were allowed, and 192 special and overseas votes that were disallowed.

1962 Timaru by-election
Party	Candidate	Votes	%	±%
Labour	Sir Basil Arthur	7,578	52.55	
National	Derek Quigley	6,271	43.49	
Social Credit	Maurice Hayes	572	3.97	
Majority		1,307	9.06	
Informal votes		34	0.24	
Turnout		14,455	83.79	−7.62
Registered electors		17,252		
Labour hold		Swing		
