= Irish New Zealanders =

Irish New Zealanders Gael-Nua-Shéalaigh
Total population
- 17,835 (by birth, 2018)

Regions with significant populations
- New Zealand, Auckland, Canterbury, West Coast

Languages
- English, Irish

Religion
- Roman Catholicism, Protestantism

Related ethnic groups
- Irish people, Ulster Scots, Irish Australians, Scottish New Zealanders, English New Zealanders, Welsh New Zealanders, European New Zealanders

The term Irish New Zealander (Irish: Gael-Nua-Shéalaigh) refers to New Zealanders of full or partial Irish ancestry. This includes Irish immigrants as well as New Zealanders of Irish descent. The term makes no distinction concerning religion and ethnic background encompasses both Catholic and Protestant (including Anglo-Irish and Ulster-Scots) immigrants and their descendants; nonetheless, the chief criterion of distinction between Irish immigrants, especially those who arrived in the nineteenth century, is religion.

Irish people have played a significant role in the history of New Zealand. The Irish diaspora in the nineteenth century reached New Zealand, with many Irish people immigrating to the country, predominantly to Auckland, Canterbury and the West Coast. With Irish immigration to New Zealand, the Irish people established Catholic churches and schools, especially in Auckland. Today, it is estimated around one in six New Zealanders have Irish ancestry. A much smaller proportion of the population self-identifies as Irish. Irish culture has influenced the wider culture of New Zealand.

The descendants of the Irish people and their culture have mixed with other New Zealand European cultures to form modern-day New Zealand culture. However, unlike many Scottish settlers in Otago and Southland Irish settlers were more spread out across the country, resulting in visible Irish communities throughout New Zealand that began to mix with other communities. Job opportunities for Irish-born New Zealanders were limited as a result of anti-Irish bias. In the 1930s 40% of the New Zealand Police Force were of Irish ancestry. One of the main reasons the Irish immigrated to New Zealand was because of the Great Famine and fear of yet another famine.

== Irish immigration to New Zealand; 1840–1915 ==
Some of the first Irish came with the Royal New Zealand Fencibles who were British army veterans given land for service. Around half of them were Irish Catholics. Until 1852 the Irish comprised just under 15% of New Zealand immigrants. A Dublin University Magazine described New Zealand as 'the most recent, remotest, and least civilised of our colonies'; the voyage cost over four times that of crossing the Atlantic to America. Immigration from the region of Leinster was common from 1840 towards 1852. Most Irish immigrants to New Zealand during the Irish diaspora that followed the Irish Famine of 1845–1852 were indigenous Irish from Munster and indirect emigrants from Australia during the gold rushes. In the early twentieth century immigration from the region of Ulster increased. This "reflected the preference for Protestants among New Zealand immigration authorities". To make New Zealand more attractive as a place of settlement for migrants, "fudging" of statistics occurred emphasising homogeneity (using the phrase '98.5 percent British'). Place of birth was used to circumvent ethnicity, "to conceal the numbers of other population groups, particularly the Irish and Chinese"

== Politics ==
Significant expressions of Irish culture came in public debate. The long struggles in Ireland for land reform, home rule rather than English rule, and eventually independence were a major concern of British politics throughout the 19th and early 20th centuries. Many in New Zealand followed these debates and crises, and expressed their sympathies publicly. Occasionally it came in the form of civil disorder. There were 'shindies' between Irish Nationalists and Irish Unionist Orangemen at Ōkārito in 1865. In Christchurch on Boxing Day 1879, 30 Irishmen attacked an Orange procession with pick-handles, and in Timaru 150 men from Thomas O'Driscoll's Hibernian Hotel surrounded Irish Orangemen and prevented their procession. In 2013 the NZ Press Council (now the NZ Media Council) upheld a number of complaints that denigrated Irish identity in New Zealand.

== Irish place names in New Zealand ==
There are some place names in New Zealand with connections to Ireland or Irish people, including:

- Ardmore, after Ardmore, County Waterford
- Athenree, after Athenree, County Tyrone
- Ballance, after Irish-born Prime Minister John Ballance
- Bangor, after Bangor, County Down
- Belfast, after Belfast
- Bowentown, after Irish-born Governor Sir George Bowen, who was from Ulster
- Camla, after Camla, County Monaghan
- Capleston, after Irish settler Patrick Caples
- Cronadun, after Cronadun, County Donegal
- Dargaville, after Irish settler Joseph Dargaville
- Dromore
- Dunsandel, after Dunsandle Castle, Galway
- Glasnevin, New Zealand, after Glasnevin, Dublin
- Glenavy, New Zealand, after Glenavy, County Antrim
- Glen Massey, after Irish-born Prime Minister William Massey
- Hobsonville, after Irish-born Governor William Hobson
- Hurleyville, after a family of Irish settlers
- Katikati, previously known as Waterford
- Kerrytown, after County Kerry
- Killinchy, after Killinchy, County Down
- Kingston, originally St Johns, after Irish-born police commissioner St John Branigan
- Martinborough, after Irish settler John Martin
- Mauriceville, after Irish-born Minister of Immigration and Crown Lands Sir George Maurice O'Rorke
- Massey, after Irish-born Prime Minister William Massey
- Shannon, after Irish settler George Vance Shannon
- Queenstown, after Cobh (formerly known as Queenstown)
- Wellington, capital of New Zealand, after Arthur Wellesley, Duke of Wellington, born in Dublin
- Westport, after Westport, County Mayo

== See also ==
- European New Zealanders
- Europeans in Oceania
- Irish Australians
- Ireland–New Zealand relations
- Pākehā
- Immigration to New Zealand
