= Awarau River =

River in New Zealand

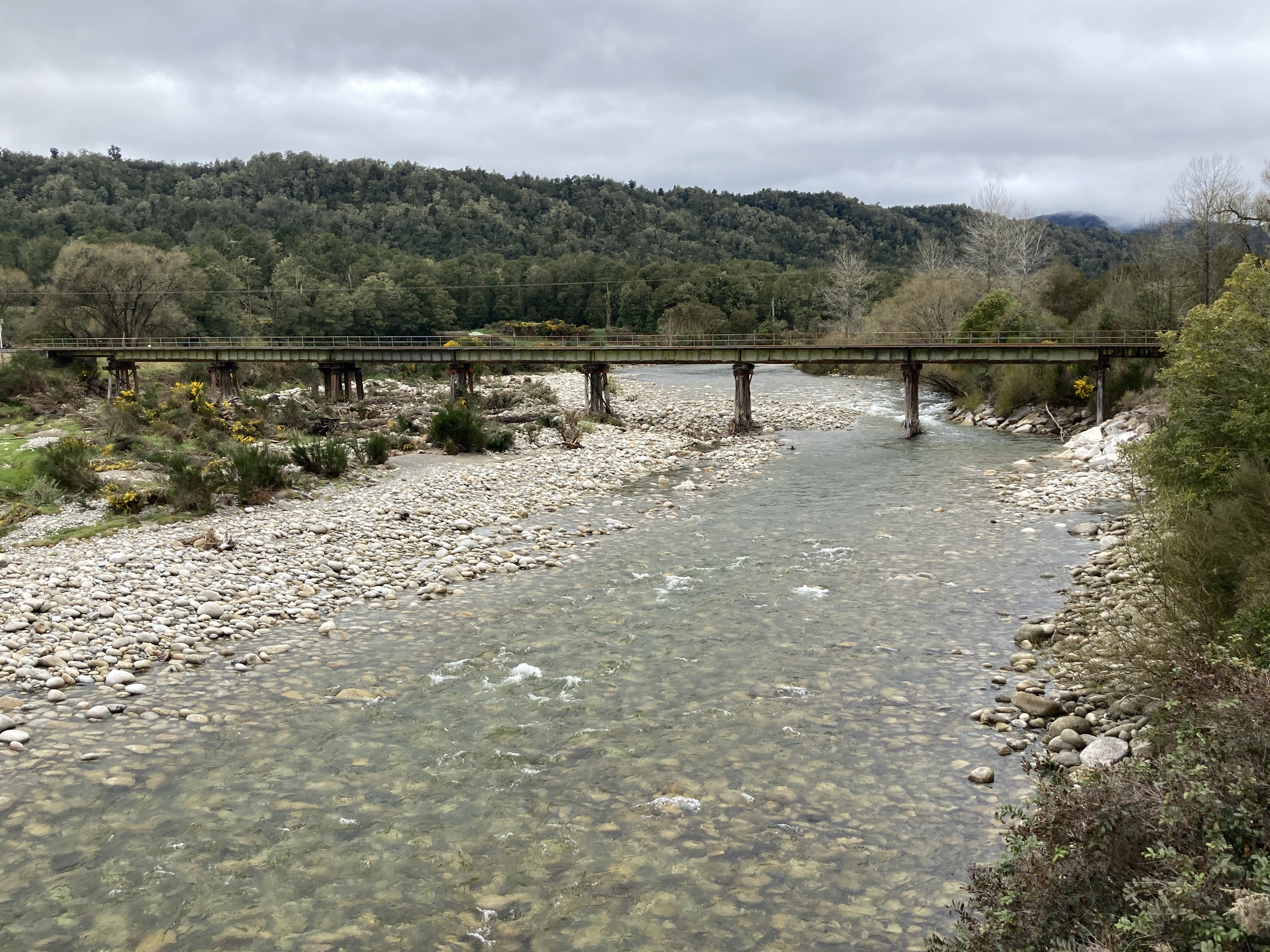
- Awarau River railway bridge

Physical characteristics
- Source: Victoria Range
  - coordinates: 44.4739241°S 168.457911°E
  - elevation: 1,639 m (5,377 ft)
- Mouth: Inangahua River
  - location: Near SH 69 and Te Wharau River mouth
  - coordinates: 41.9956°S 171.892°E
  - elevation: 105 m (344 ft)
- Length: 27 km (17 mi)

Basin features
- Progression: Victoria Range → Awarau River → Inangahua River → Buller River → Tasman Sea
- Tributaries
  - left: Silcock Creek, Bateman Creek, Potter Creek
  - right: Farmer Creek

The Awarau River, also known as Larry's Creek, is located within the South Island of New Zealand. The river is about 27 kilometres (17 mi) long and runs northwest from its headwaters in the Victoria Range to its confluence with the Inangahua River north of Reefton. It also drains part of the Brunner Range and there was a track along that range linking to Lyell by 1901, though none existed in 1874. A track also ran south over Kirwan Hill to the Montgomerie River.

A 6 km (3.7 mi) forestry road runs north of the river from SH69 to Larrys Creek Track, which runs a further 2.4 km (1.5 mi) to the site of the Caledonian Gold Mine. The mine operated from 1874 to 1910, with shafts up to 285 ft (87 m) deep. It is the most northerly in the Reefton goldfield, in albite-epidote hornfels facies, which are less than 370 million years old. Remnants of a stamping battery and a Robey portable steam engine are at the mine site. Colinton was formed in 1874 as the township for the mine (and the river was sometimes called Colin River). By 1878 it had a population of 44, but was gone by 1901. Just upstream is a deep, rocky gorge.

The only bridges over the river are the Stillwater–Ngākawau railway and SH69. Railway bridge 74 was a 325 ft (99 m) road-rail bridge of 7 spans, built in 1905 for £2,915. A bridge was planned at Colinton in 1880, but never built.

Nothofagus fusca (red beech, or tawhai raunui) forests grow to about the 350 m (1,150 ft) contour, with Nothofagus menziesii (silver beech, tawhai, or tahina) up to the tree line at about 1,300 m (4,300 ft). Tūī, Anthornis melanura (korimako, makomako, kōmako, or bellbird), Petroica macrocephala (ngirungiru, or tomtit) and Petroica australis (Kakaruwai, or South Island robin) live in the bush.
