= Electoral history of George Forbes =

List of elections featuring George Forbes as a candidate

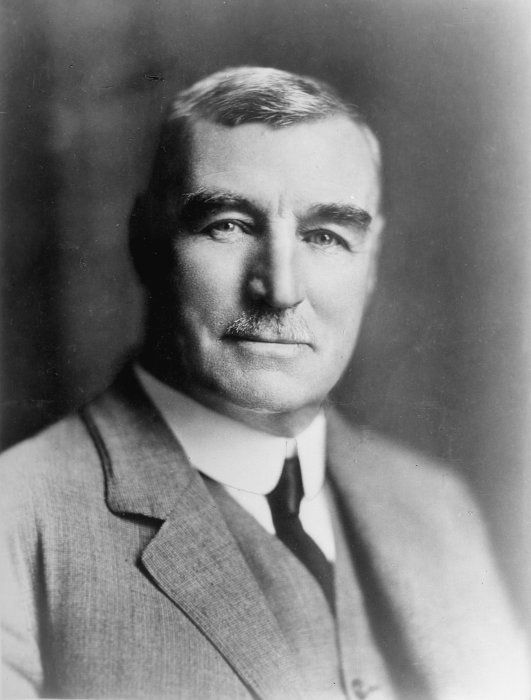
George Forbes, circa 1932.

This is a summary of the electoral history of George Forbes, Prime Minister of New Zealand (1930–35) and Member of Parliament for Hurunui (1908–43).

== Parliamentary elections ==
=== 1902 election ===
General election, 1902: Hurunui
Party	Candidate	Votes	%	±%
Liberal	Andrew Rutherford	1,577	44.24	
Conservative	Henry Fear Reece	880	24.69	
Liberal	Richard Meredith	834	23.40	
Liberal	George Forbes	205	5.75	
Independent Liberal	George Pulley	68	1.90	
Majority		697	19.55	
Turnout		3,564	85.69	
Registered electors		4,519		

=== 1908 election ===
General election, 1908: Hurunui, Second ballot
Party	Candidate	Votes	%	±%
Liberal	George Forbes	2,150	57.88	+9.66
Conservative	Obed Cloither	1,553	41.81	+10.02
Informal votes		11	0.29	0.54
Majority		597	16.07	
Turnout		3,714	64.99	−9.61

General election, 1908: Hurunui, First ballot
Party	Candidate	Votes	%	±%
Liberal	George Forbes	2,056	48.22	
Conservative	Obed Cloither	1,357	31.83	
Ind. Labour League	G D Greenwood	509	11.93	
Independent Liberal	George Pulley	309	7.24	
Informal votes		32	0.75	
Turnout		4,263	74.60	
Registered electors		5,714		

=== 1911 election ===
General election, 1911: Hurunui, First ballot
Party	Candidate	Votes	%	±%
Liberal	George Forbes	2,940	58.89	+1.01
Reform	David Macfarlane	2,001	40.08	
Informal votes		51	1.02	+0.52
Majority		939	18.81	+2.74
Turnout		4,992	79.16	+14.17
Registered electors		6,306		

=== 1914 election ===
General election, 1914: Hurunui
Party	Candidate	Votes	%	±%
Liberal	George Forbes	3,233	64.91	+6.02
Reform	William Banks	1,747	35.08	
Informal votes		46	0.92	−0.10
Majority		1,486	29.83	+11.02
Turnout		4,980	82.79	+3.63
Registered electors		6,015		

=== 1919 election ===
General election, 1919: Hurunui
Party	Candidate	Votes	%	±%
Liberal	George Forbes	3,008	52.11	−12.80
Reform	George Armstrong	2,341	40.55	
Independent	G G Gardner	373	6.46	
Informal votes		50	0.86	−0.16
Majority		667	11.55	−18.28
Turnout		5,772	80.76	−2.03
Registered electors		7,147		

=== 1922 election ===
General election, 1922: Hurunui
Party	Candidate	Votes	%	±%
Liberal	George Forbes	3,963	58.09	+5.98
Reform	Samuel Andrew	2,765	40.53	
Informal votes		94	1.37	+0.51
Majority		1,198	17.56	+6.01
Turnout		6,822	85.42	+4.66
Registered electors		7,986		

=== 1925 election ===
General election, 1925: Hurunui
Party	Candidate	Votes	%	±%
Liberal	George Forbes	3,989	55.14	−2.95
Reform	George Armstrong	3,178	43.93	
Informal votes		67	0.92	−0.45
Majority		811	11.21	−5.35
Turnout		7,234	90.65	+5.23
Registered electors		7,980		

=== 1928 election ===
General election, 1928: Hurunui
Party	Candidate	Votes	%	±%
United	George Forbes	5,344	56.05	+0.91
Reform	Leslie Robert Cathcart Macfarlane	3,505	36.76	
Labour	Frederick Turley	576	6.04	
Informal votes		108	1.13	+0.21
Majority		1,839	19.29	+8.08
Turnout		9,533	90.09	−0.56
Registered electors		10,581		

=== 1931 election ===
General election, 1931: Hurunui
Party	Candidate	Votes	%	±%
United	George Forbes	6,151	73.67	+17.62
Labour	Robert Joseph Logan	2,198	26.33	
Informal votes		67	0.80	−0.33
Majority		3,953	47.35	+28.06
Turnout		8,416	79.83	−10.26
Registered electors		10,543		

=== 1935 election ===
General election, 1935: Hurunui
Party	Candidate	Votes	%	±%
United	George Forbes	4,897	49.20	−24.47
Labour	Donald Cyrus Davies	3,694	37.11	
Independent	Oliver Duff	1,362	13.68	
Informal votes		67	0.67	−0.13
Majority		1,203	12.08	−35.27
Turnout		9,953	90.43	+10.60
Registered electors		11,006		

=== 1938 election ===
General election, 1938: Hurunui
Party	Candidate	Votes	%	±%
National	George Forbes	5,679	52.23	+3.03
Labour	Harold Denton	5,144	47.31	
Informal votes		49	0.45	−0.22
Majority		535	4.92	−7.16
Turnout		10,872	94.71	+4.28
Registered electors		11,479		

== Bibliography ==
- Hislop, J. (1923). The General Election, 1922. Government Printer.
- McRobie, Alan (1989). Electoral Atlas of New Zealand. Wellington: GP Books. ISBN 0-477-01384-8.
