= Larry (disambiguation) =

Larry is a masculine given name. It may also refer to:

- Cyclone Larry, a cyclone that caused extensive damage in Australia in 2006
- Tropical Storm Larry (2003), which struck Mexico
- Lionel Larry (born 1986), American sprinter
- Wendy Larry (born 1955), American college women's basketball coach
- Larry (1974 film), a TV film
- Come Play, a 2020 film, adapted from a 2018 short film Larry
- Larry (cartoonist), English cartoonist
- Larry (cat), British cat employed as Chief Mouser to the Cabinet Office
- Larry (footballer), Brazilian footballer
- Larry (rapper), French rapper

== See also ==
- The Larry shorts, early animated work from Family Guy creator Seth MacFarlane
- Larry's River, Nova Scotia, Canada
- Larry's Creek, New Zealand, also known as the Awarau River
- Larrys Creek, Pennsylvania, United States
- Larries, a group of shipping conspiracy theorists who believe Harry Styles and Louis Tomlinson from the band One Direction are or were in a romantic relationship
