= Derek Quigley =

New Zealand politician (born 1932)

The Honourable Derek Quigley QSO
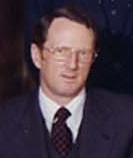
- Quigley in 1981

14th Minister of Works and Development
- In office 11 December 1981 – 15 June 1982
- Prime Minister: Robert Muldoon
- Preceded by: Bill Young
- Succeeded by: Tony Friedlander

14th Minister of Tourism
- In office 12 February 1981 – 11 December 1981
- Prime Minister: Robert Muldoon
- Preceded by: Warren Cooper
- Succeeded by: Rob Talbot

14th Minister of Housing
- In office 13 December 1978 – 15 June 1982
- Prime Minister: Robert Muldoon
- Preceded by: Eric Holland
- Succeeded by: Tony Friedlander

Member of the New Zealand Parliament for Rangiora
- In office 29 November 1975 – 14 July 1984
- Preceded by: Kerry Burke
- Succeeded by: Jim Gerard

Member of Parliament for ACT Party List
- In office 12 October 1996 – 27 November 1999

Personal details
- Born: 31 January 1932 (age 94) Waikari, New Zealand
- Party: ACT New Zealand
- Other political affiliations: National (1962–1984)

Derek Francis Quigley QSO (born 31 January 1932) is a New Zealand former politician. He was a prominent member of the National Party during the late 1970s and early 1980s, and was known for his support of free-market economics and trade liberalisation. Quigley left the National Party after clashing with its leadership, and later co-founded the ACT New Zealand party.

== Early life ==
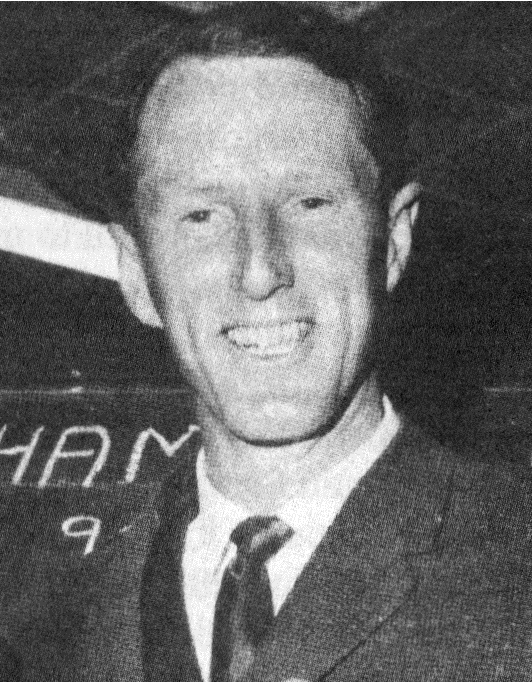
Quigley in 1963

Quigley was born on 31 January 1932 in Waikari, a small town in the northern Canterbury Region, the son of Francis John Quigley. He attended Waipara Primary school before continuing with education in Christchurch; first at Medbury School, then Christ's College, followed by the University of Canterbury. He later donated his personal parliamentary library, which covers his political career until 1984, to Canterbury University's Macmillan Brown Library.

Quigley farmed at Waipara from 1949. He gained one of two scholarships for young farmers from the Meat and Wool Board and used it to study farming in Britain and the United States. He completed a law degree while farming and joined a Christchurch law firm, where he became a senior partner and practised as a lawyer.

In 1956, Quigley married Judith Ann Dickson, and the couple had four children. He later married Susan McAffer.

== Member of Parliament ==
Quigley was National's electorate chairman for the Rangiora electorate. In the Canterbury-Westland division, he was deputy chairman. He was a member of the Dominion Council and served on its executive committee.

He also stood in the safe Labour seat of Sydenham against cabinet minister Mabel Howard in the 1960 and 1963 elections. He also sought the National nomination for the safe National seat of Hurunui at a 1961 by-election, but was unsuccessful. As a 30-year-old, Quigley stood as the National Party's candidate in the 1962 by-election in the Timaru electorate, but was beaten by Labour's candidate Sir Basil Arthur.

Quigley stood in the Rangiora electorate in the 1975 election. The electorate had been taken from National by Kerry Burke of the Labour Party at the previous election, but was won back by Quigley.

=== Cabinet Minister ===
New Zealand Parliament
Years	Term	Electorate	List	Party
1975–1978	38th	Rangiora		National
1978–1981	39th	Rangiora		National
1981–1984	40th	Rangiora		National
1996–1999	45th	List	2	ACT

After three years as a backbencher, Quigley was appointed to Cabinet, and held a number of ministerial roles. He was Minister of Housing (1978–1982), Minister of Tourism (1981), Minister of Works and Development (1981–1982), and Associate Minister of Finance (1978–1981). He held further minor ministerial posts as Minister of Earthquake and War Damage (1978–1982), Minister of Government Life Insurance (1978–1982), Minister of Public Trust (1978–1981), and Minister for State Insurance (1978–1982).

Quigley rapidly earned the hostility of senior National Party figures, however, with his criticism of the government's economic policies. The Prime Minister of the day, Robert Muldoon, favoured decidedly interventionist policies, but Quigley preferred a more laissez-faire approach, and considered Muldoon's interventionism to be contrary to the traditional spirit of the National Party. In February 1981, Quigley contested the deputy leadership of the party, despite Muldoon openly saying that he could not work with him. Quigley's main opponent (and Muldoon's strong favourite) was Duncan MacIntyre, a long-serving Muldoon loyalist. Bill Birch retired from the contest in favour of MacIntyre, and Jim Bolger was eliminated first. Quigley was narrowly defeated by MacIntyre.

A week after Quigley lost the deputy leadership race, he was dismissed by Muldoon as Associate Finance Minister, reducing his ability to criticise Muldoon's economic policies effectively; Warren Cooper succeeded him. This was also related to a preceding event in December 1980 when Quigley spoke of releasing an "alternative economic manifesto" and Muldoon threatened to sack him from the Cabinet. Muldoon eventually relieved Quigley not only of the finance associate portfolio but removed him from the Cabinet expenditure committee as well.

Quigley nevertheless continued his attacks. In June the following year, he made a public denunciation of the government's policies, saying that the state should have a passive role in the economy while giving a speech to the Young Nationals in which he raised doubts about the government's Think Big growth strategy, which aimed to overcome crippling foreign exchange losses by using cheap power in the manufacture of steel, aluminium and timber products to export. Subsequently, Muldoon told Quigley to attempt to prevent the editor of The Dominion from publishing the full transcript of the speech. Quigley declined, saying such an approach might be misinterpreted. Muldoon also told him that if he went through with his scheduled appearance on the Newsmakers current affairs programme that it would require his subsequent resignation. Yet again Quigley defied Muldoon and went on the show where he made no attempt at retracting his criticisms of government economic policy. Muldoon and his allies reacted furiously to this continued public criticism with Muldoon saying that Quigley had "offended, embarrassed and angered his parliamentary colleagues" and that his speech had gone beyond what was acceptable from a cabinet minister. Quigley was given the choice of either giving a public apology or resigning from Cabinet; he chose to resign.

After quitting the cabinet Quigley said he was considering leaving from Parliament altogether. This would have forced a by-election which could bring down the Muldoon Government, which only had a one-seat working majority. Ultimately he did not resign his seat, to the relief of the National Party who were nervous at the prospect of defending it at a by-election.

At the 1984 election, he resigned from politics altogether, becoming a business consultant.

== ACT New Zealand ==
After leaving Parliament, his consultancy firm the Hugo Consulting Group and then later Strategos carried out some major consultancy jobs for the Lange government reviews of multiple government departments including Ministry of Defence, Treasury, Ministry of Justice and Police. When National won power in 1990, curiously, the government consultancy jobs his firm were being offered ceased.

In 1994, Quigley re-entered the political arena, joining forces with Roger Douglas to form the ACT New Zealand party. The new MMP electoral system, which made it easier for smaller parties to win seats, convinced Quigley that a strongly free-market party could indeed be successful. In the 1996 election, the first conducted under MMP, Quigley was returned to Parliament as an ACT list MP. He unsuccessfully sought to be Speaker of the House, and was instead appointed the chair of the Foreign Affairs, Defence and Trade Select Committee. Under Quigley's chairmanship, the select committee produced The Defence Beyond 2000 Report, which became the blueprint for the Clark government's radical restructuring of the New Zealand Defence Force.

Quigley did not stand for re-election in 1999 election and was immediately appointed by the incoming Prime Minister, Helen Clark, to review the contract the previous government had signed with the United States for New Zealand to acquire 28 near new F-16 fighter aircraft. Quigley advised the government to renegotiate the contract and acquire a lesser number of aircraft. One of his reasons for this recommendation was that cancellation of the contract would result in the abandonment of the RNZAF's air combat capability. The government disputed this and cancelled the contract. Two years later, it disbanded the RNZAF's air combat capability, just as predicted.

In early 2004 Quigley moved to Canberra to take up a position as a visiting fellow at ANU's Strategic & Defence Studies Centre. He researched and wrote on trans-Tasman and regional security issues and on the ongoing situation between the United States and New Zealand over the latter's anti-nuclear policy.

== Honours and awards ==
In 1977, Quigley was awarded the Queen Elizabeth II Silver Jubilee Medal, and in 1990 he received the New Zealand 1990 Commemoration Medal. In the 2004 New Year Honours, he was appointed a Companion of the Queen's Service Order for public services.

== Notes ==
Political offices
Preceded by Bill Young	Minister of Works and Development; 1981–1982	Succeeded by Tony Friedlander
Preceded by Warren Cooper	Minister of Tourism; 1981	Succeeded by Rob Talbot
Preceded by Eric Holland	Minister of Housing; 1978–1982	Succeeded by Tony Friedlander
New Zealand Parliament
Preceded by Kerry Burke	Member of Parliament for Rangiora; 1975–1984	Succeeded by Jim Gerard
