= State Highway 69 (New Zealand) =

Road in New Zealand

State Highway 69

Route information
- Maintained by NZ Transport Agency Waka Kotahi
- Length: 33.3 km (20.7 mi)

Major junctions
- North end: SH 6 (Upper/Lower Buller Gorge Road) at Inangahua Junction
- South end: SH 7 (Broadway/Grey Road) at Reefton

Location
- Country: New Zealand
- Primary destinations: Cronadun

Highway system
- New Zealand state highways; Motorways and expressways; List
| ← SH 67 | → SH 70 |

State Highway 69 (SH 69) is a New Zealand state highway servicing the southeastern areas of the Buller District in the South Island of New Zealand. The road is 33 kilometres long and runs parallel with both the Stillwater-Westport Line and the Inangahua River. The road connects the towns of Reefton (on SH 7) with the town of Inangahua Junction (on SH 6) via Cronadun. The highway is part of the main link between the centres of Christchurch and Westport.

== See also ==
- List of New Zealand state highways
