= 1961 Hurunui by-election =

New Zealand by-election

- 10 June 1961
- Turnout: 12,557 (74.13%)

Candidate	Lorrie Pickering	Arthur Adcock
Party	National	Labour
Popular vote	6,644	4,760
Percentage	52.91	37.91
Member before election
William Gillespie
National
Elected Member
Lorrie Pickering
National

The Hurunui by-election 1961 was a by-election held in the Hurunui electorate in North Canterbury during the term of the 33rd New Zealand Parliament, on 10 June 1961.

The by-election was caused by the death of incumbent MP William Gillespie of the National Party on 23 April 1961.

== Candidates ==
Labour
The Labour Party selected Arthur Alexander Adcock as its candidate. Adcock, a railway worker, was secretary of the local Amalgamated Society of Railway Servants branch and a member of the Waimairi County Council. He had contested the seat in 1960 against Gillespie.

National
There were several names put forward as potential nominees for the National Party candidacy:

- Frederick Ashe, a farmer in Flaxton and Okuku, former member of the Eyre County Council who had contested the National nomination for Kaiapoi in 1938
- William Murray Dailey, a farmer at Oxford and chairman of the Oxford County Council
- J. A. G. Fulton, a farmer at Loburn and former chairman of the Sefton and districts branch of Federated Farmers
- Clutha N. McKenzie, a farmer at Motunau and chairman of Waipara County Council (grandson of Sir Thomas Mackenzie)
- Lorrie Pickering, a farmer at Motunau and radio broadcaster who was National's candidate for Avon in 1960
- Derek Quigley, a farmer at Waipara who was National's candidate for Sydenham in 1960
- W. W. Wood, a land agent and bookshop proprietor at Rangiora who was a committee member of the Rangiora National Party

Ultimately Pickering was chosen to contest the seat.

Social Credit
The Social Credit Party selected Malcolm Jack Clark, an engineer from Waikari, as its candidate for the seat.

== Results ==
The following table gives the election results:

1961 Hurunui by-election
Party	Candidate	Votes	%	±%
National	Lorrie Pickering	6,644	52.91	
Labour	Arthur Adcock	4,760	37.91	
Social Credit	Jack Clark	1,153	9.18	
Majority		1,884	15.00	
Turnout		12,557	74.13	
Registered electors		16,940		
National hold		Swing		

The by-election was won by Lorrie Pickering.
