= Shadow Cabinet of Keith Holyoake =

New Zealand political leader Keith Holyoake assembled a "shadow cabinet" within the National Party caucus after his change to the position of Leader of the Opposition in 1957. He composed this of individuals who acted for the party as spokespeople in assigned roles while he was Leader of the Opposition (1957–60). As the National Party formed the largest party not in government at the time, the frontbench team was as a result the Official Opposition within the New Zealand House of Representatives.

== Frontbench team ==
The list below contains a list of Holyoake's shadow ministers and their respective roles.

Rank	Shadow Minister	Portfolio
1	Rt Hon Keith Holyoake	Leader of the Opposition
2	Hon Jack Marshall	Deputy Leader of the Opposition; Shadow Minister of Justice; Shadow Attorney-General
3	Hon Jack Watts	Shadow Minister of Finance; Shadow Minister of Trade; Shadow Minister of Marketing
4	Hon Dean Eyre	Shadow Minister of Defence; Shadow Minister of Housing
5	Hon Ronald Algie	Shadow Minister of Foreign Affairs
6	Hon Stan Goosman	Shadow Minister of Works; Shadow Minister of Electricity
7	William Gillespie	Shadow Minister of Agriculture; Shadow Minister of Lands
8	Hon Ralph Hanan	Shadow Minister of Health; Shadow Minister of Social Security
9	Hon John McAlpine	Shadow Minister of Transport; Shadow Minister of Labour; Shadow Minister of Employment
10	Geoffrey Sim	Shadow Minister of Maori Affairs
11	Hon Sidney Smith	Shadow Minister of Local Government; Shadow Minister of Internal Affairs
12	Hon Tom Shand	Shadow Minister of Civil Aviation
13	Hon Geoff Gerard	Senior Whip
14	Ernest Aderman	Junior Whip
