= Kerrytown =

Kerrytown or Kerry Town may refer to:

- Kerry Town, a village in Sierra Leone and location of an Ebola treatment center
- Kerrytown, Ann Arbor, a historic district in Ann Arbor, Michigan
- Kerrytown, New Zealand, a rural community in New Zealand
