= Lorrie Pickering =

New Zealand politician (1919–2009)

Herbert Elmer Lorraine Pickering QSO JP (29 March 1919 – 25 July 2009) was a New Zealand politician of the National Party, and was a cabinet minister.

== Biography ==
New Zealand Parliament
Years	Term	Electorate	Party
1961–1963	33rd	Hurunui	National
1963–1966	34th	Rangiora	National
1966–1969	35th	Rangiora	National
1969–1972	36th	Rangiora	National

Pickering was born in Havelock in 1919, the son of Charles Henry Pickering. He received his education from Marlborough College, Christchurch Teachers' College, and the University of Canterbury. During World War II, he was a flying instructor for the RNZAF. After the war, he worked for the New Zealand Broadcasting School. In 1941, Pickering married Margaret Priscilla McKenzie, the daughter of Donald Seaforth McKenzie; they were to have two sons and one daughter.

He contested the Avon electorate for National in 1960 election; then, following the death of William Gillespie, he contested the Hurunui electorate in the 1961 by-election and was elected. The Hurunui electorate was abolished in 1963, and Pickering successfully contested the Rangiora electorate instead, which he represented until his retirement due to ill-health in 1972.

In 1961 he was one of ten National MPs to vote with the Opposition and remove capital punishment for murder from the Crimes Bill that the Second National Government had introduced.

In 1969, he was appointed to the Executive Council by Keith Holyoake (unusually, he was not also a cabinet minister) and served until 1972. He was Minister of Education in the Second National Government under Jack Marshall, from 9 February to 8 December 1972.

In the 1993 Queen's Birthday Honours, Pickering was appointed a Companion of the Queen's Service Order for public services. Pickering died on 25 July 2009.

== Notes ==
New Zealand Parliament
Preceded by William Gillespie	Member of Parliament for Hurunui; 1961–1963	Constituency abolished
New constituency	Member of Parliament for Rangiora; 1963–1972	Succeeded by Kerry Burke
Political offices
Preceded by Brian Talboys	Minister of Education; 1972	Succeeded by Phil Amos
