= Montgomerie River =

Coordinates: 42°09′S 172°00′E

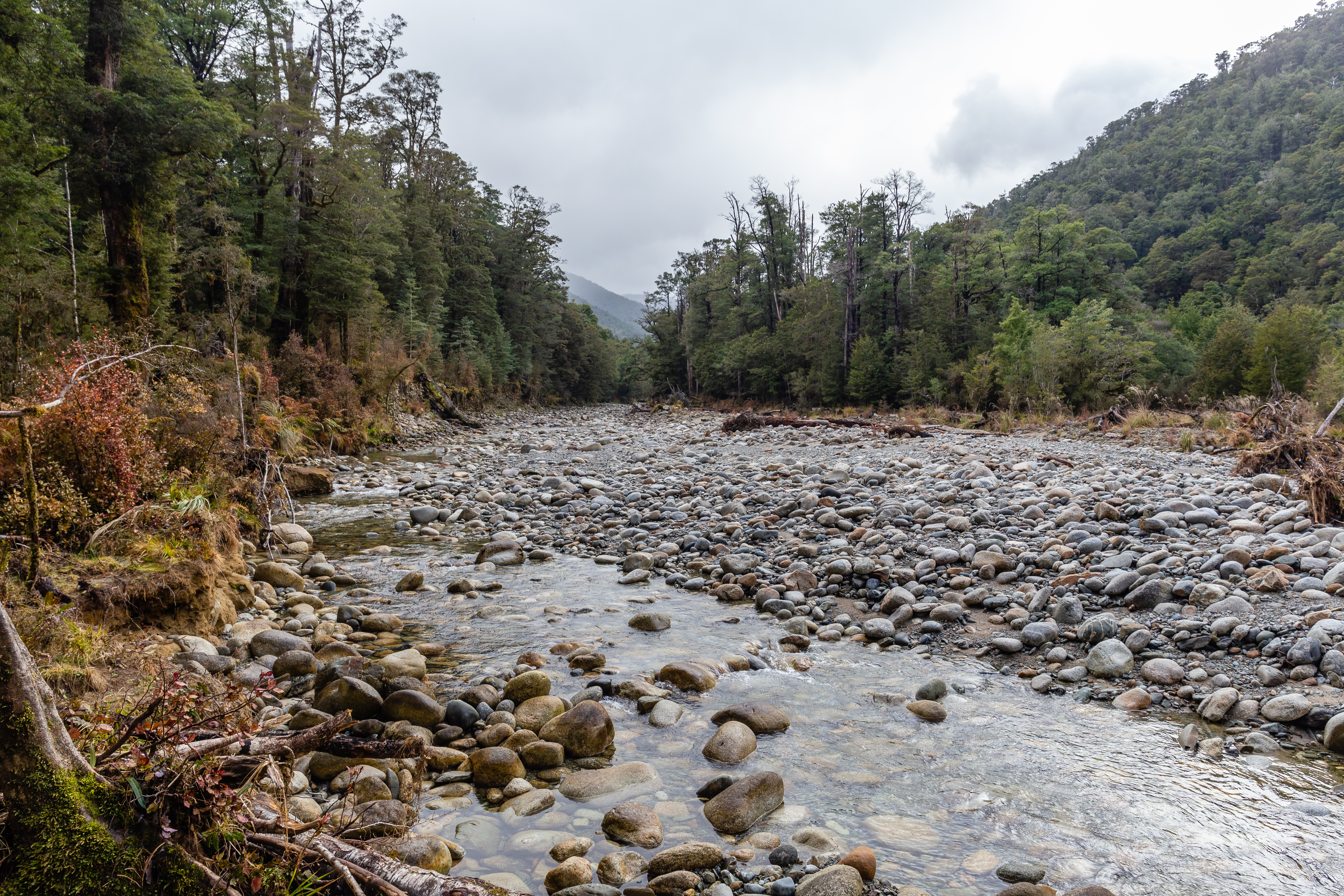

Location
- Country: New Zealand

Physical characteristics
- Source
  - location: Victoria Range
- Mouth
  - location: Waitahu River
- Length: 15 km (9.3 mi)

The Montgomerie River is a river in the Buller District of New Zealand's South Island. It flows southwest from the Victoria Range to reach the Waitahu River 12 kilometres (7.5 mi) east of Reefton. The river's entire length is within Victoria Forest Park.

== See also ==
- List of rivers of New Zealand
