= Ireland–New Zealand relations =

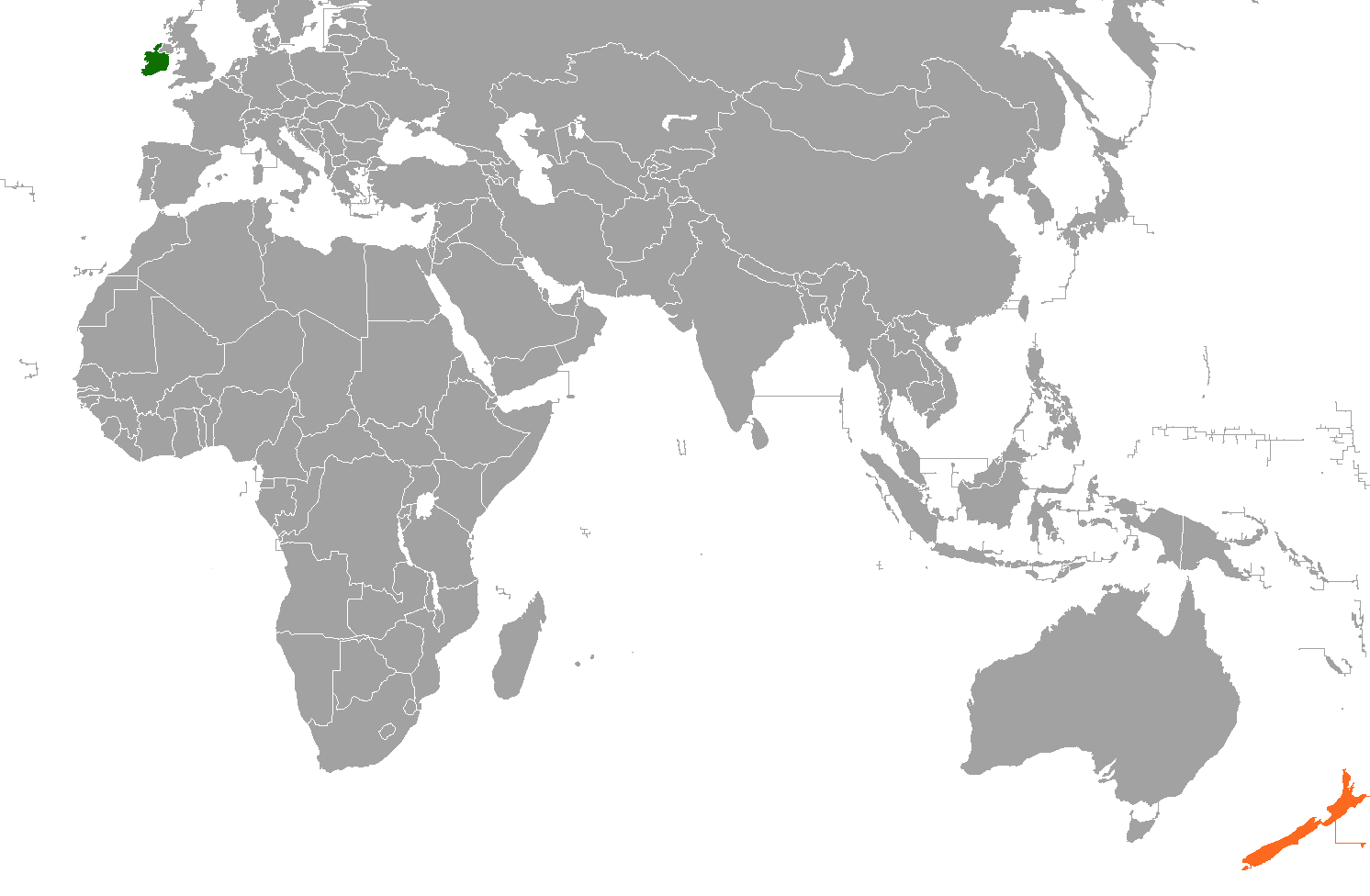

- Ireland: New Zealand

The diplomatic relations between Ireland and New Zealand are well developed. Both nations are members of the Australia Group, Organisation for Economic Co-operation and Development and the United Nations.

Both nations are English-speaking nations. As a result of famine and poverty, several thousand Irish people migrated to New Zealand where today approximately 20% of the population can claim Irish heritage.

== History ==
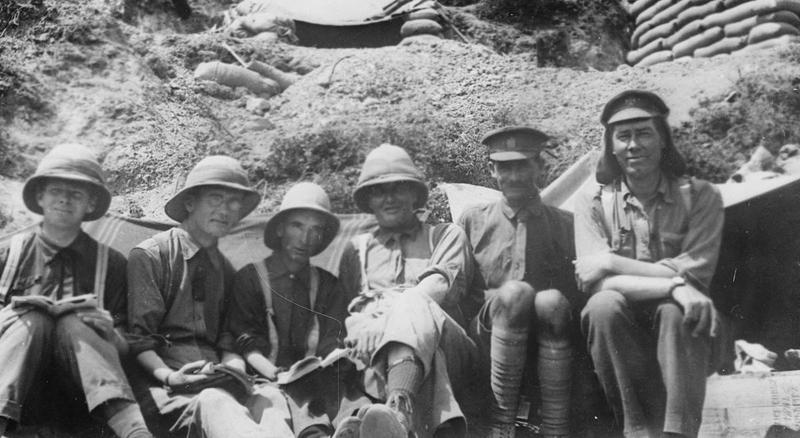
Chaplains from Australia, Ireland and New Zealand together during the Gallipoli Campaign

Historically, both Ireland and New Zealand were constitutionally linked when the United Kingdom formally established the Colony of New South Wales in 1788 which included most of present-day New Zealand. In 1840, New Zealand formally joined the British Empire after the signing of the Treaty of Waitangi. The first major contact between both nations was during first wave of Irish immigration to New Zealand. Because the Irish were considered to be "British", it is unknown who the first Irish were to reach New Zealand, however, the first Irish migrants to reach New Zealand would have occurred around 1840 when the New Zealand Company first began assisting would-be migrants to settle in New Zealand. In comparison to Irish immigration to North America and Australia, very few Irish people migrated to New Zealand, mainly due to the cost of travel and the enormous distance between both nations. Over the years, however, several waves of Irish people would migrate to New Zealand and as a result, approximately 18% of the population of New Zealand today can claim Irish descent.

Both Irish and New Zealand soldiers fought side by side for the British Empire during the Second Boer War from 1899 to 1902 and World War I from 1914 to 1918, especially during the Gallipoli Campaign. During the Easter Rising in 1916 and when Ireland declared its independence from the United Kingdom in 1919, many Irish New Zealanders became involved in the Irish cause, however, their numbers were never great which may have been attributed to the fact that most of those with Irish origins in the country were already second generation New Zealanders with loose connections with Ireland. By 1947, New Zealand essentially became an independent nation after accepting the Statute of Westminster Adopting Act.

== Post-independence ==
In May 1948, former Irish Taoiseach Éamon de Valera traveled to New Zealand seeking support for a united Ireland, but was not successful due to the fact that Ireland remained neutral during World War II whereas New Zealand fought as part of the British Commonwealth armed forces in the war. Although New Zealand did not support a united Ireland, many New Zealanders still hold Ireland as an important contributor to their country both culturally and historically.

In 1976, Ireland opened an honorary consulate-general in Auckland to represent Irish interests in the country. The current honorary consul-general is Niamh McMahon. In 2000, New Zealand re-opened an honorary consulate-general in Dublin. Both countries maintain strong political links and similar interests with regard to climate change and peaceful resolutions in trouble zones throughout the world. Several prime ministers have visited each other's countries respectively. Furthermore, three of the Prime Minister of New Zealand have been born in Ireland. Both countries have established working holiday visa with each other and work closely together with regard to agriculture.

Until 2018, the two countries did not have resident embassies in each other's capital, with the Irish Embassy in Canberra, Australia being cross-accredited to Wellington, and the New Zealand High Commission in London in the United Kingdom being cross-accredited to Dublin. In August 2018, however, Ireland opened its first resident embassy in Wellington. In November 2018, New Zealand opened its first resident embassy in Dublin.

== High-level visits ==
=== High-level visits from Ireland to New Zealand ===
- President Patrick Hillery (1985)
- Taoiseach Charles Haughey (1988)
- President Mary McAleese (1998, 2007)
- President Michael D. Higgins (2017)

=== High-level visits from New Zealand to Ireland ===
- Prime Minister Bill Rowling (1975)
- Prime Minister Helen Clark (2005)
- Trade Minister Tim Groser (2015)
- Foreign Minister Winston Peters (2018)

== Trade ==
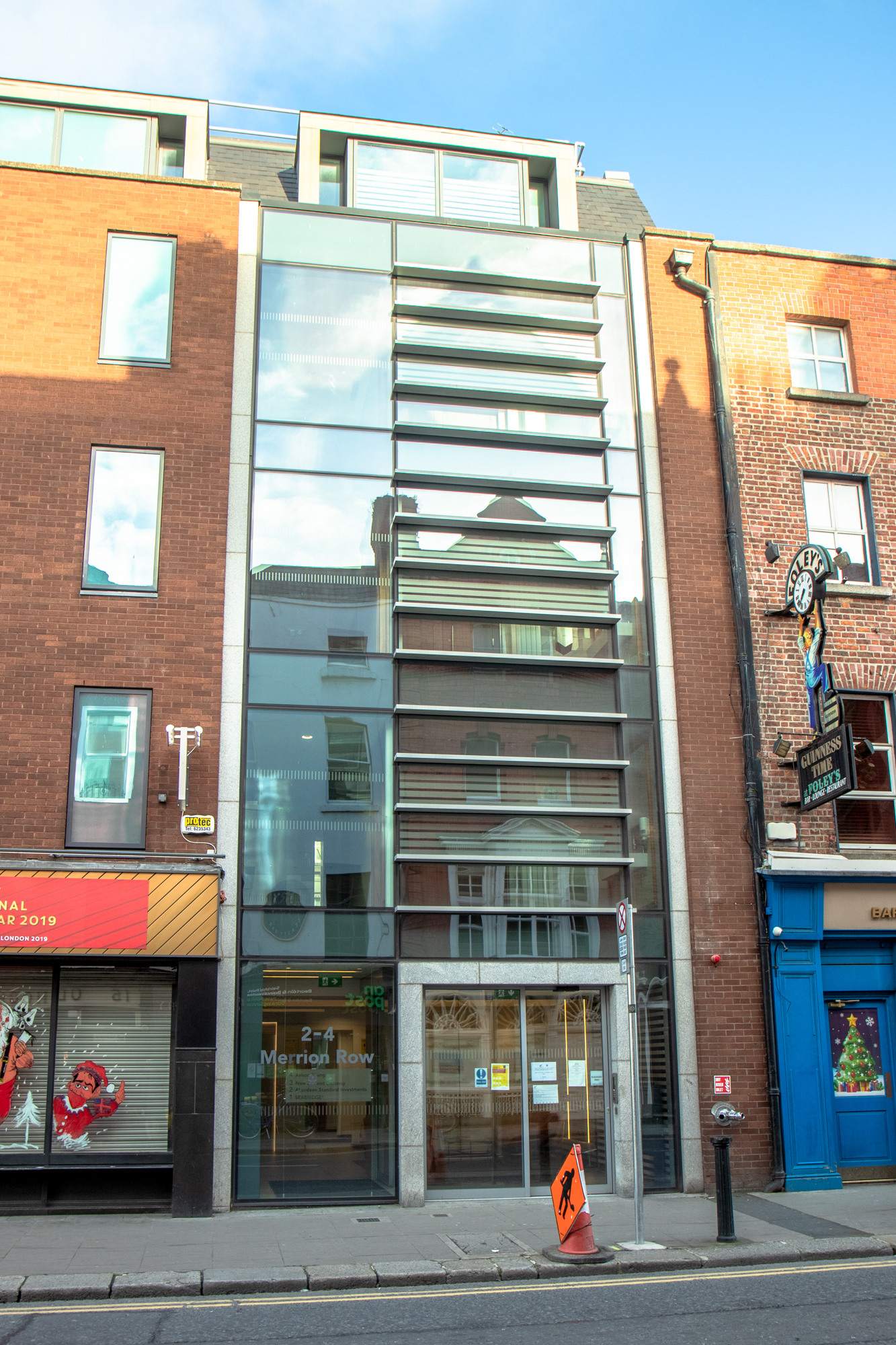
Building hosting the Embassy of New Zealand in Dublin

In 2019, trade between Ireland and New Zealand totaled $533 million New Zealand dollars. Ireland's main exports to New Zealand include mainly pharmaceutical products. New Zealand's main exports to Ireland include: wine, mechanical machinery and equipment.

== Resident diplomatic missions ==
- Ireland has an embassy in Wellington.
- New Zealand has an embassy in Dublin.

== See also ==
- Foreign relations of Ireland
- Foreign relations of New Zealand
- Irish New Zealanders
