= Minister for State Insurance =

Former cabinet member in New Zealand

The Minister for State Insurance was a former cabinet member in New Zealand appointed by the Prime Minister to be responsible for New Zealand's state owned insurance scheme.

It was established in response to the founding of the State Fire Insurance Office in 1903 following a government decision for state involvement in the insurance industry. The portfolio existed until 1990 when, following its restructuring as a state owned enterprise, and it was sold to Norwich Union in 1990.

== List of ministers ==
The following ministers have held the office of Minister for State Insurance.

Key

Liberal Reform United Labour National

No.	Name	Portrait	Term of Office		Prime Minister
1	Albert Pitt		6 August 1906	December 1906	Ward
2	George Fowlds		December 1906	4 September 1911	Ward
3	David Buddo		4 September 1911	28 March 1912	Ward
4	George Warren Russell		28 March 1912	10 July 1912	Mackenzie
5	Frank Fisher		10 July 1912	12 August 1915	Massey
6	William MacDonald		12 August 1915	25 August 1919	Massey
7	John Bird Hine		4 September 1919	17 May 1920	Massey
8	George James Anderson		17 May 1920	7 June 1923	Massey
9	Heaton Rhodes		7 June 1923	24 May 1926	Massey
9	Heaton Rhodes		7 June 1923	24 May 1926	Bell
9	Heaton Rhodes		7 June 1923	24 May 1926	Coates
10	William Nosworthy		24 May 1926	10 December 1928	Coates
11	Āpirana Ngata		10 December 1928	1 November 1934	Ward
11	Āpirana Ngata		10 December 1928	1 November 1934	Forbes
12	George Forbes		1 November 1934	19 December 1934	Forbes
13	Robert Masters		19 December 1934	6 December 1935	Forbes
14	Walter Nash		6 December 1935	30 April 1940	Savage
14	Walter Nash		6 December 1935	30 April 1940	Fraser
15	David Wilson		30 April 1940	12 April 1944	Fraser
16	Arnold Nordmeyer		12 April 1944	18 December 1946	Fraser
17	Fred Hackett		18 December 1946	18 October 1947	Fraser
18	Rex Mason		18 October 1947	13 December 1949	Fraser
19	Wilfred Fortune		13 December 1949	26 November 1954	Holland
20	Ernest Corbett		26 November 1954	23 March 1956	Holland
21	Dean Eyre		23 March 1956	12 December 1957	Holland
21	Dean Eyre		23 March 1956	12 December 1957	Holyoake
22	Philip Skoglund		12 December 1957	12 December 1960	Nash
23	Arthur Kinsella		12 December 1960	20 December 1963	Holyoake
24	John Rae		20 December 1963	9 February 1972	Holyoake
25	George Gair		9 February 1972	8 December 1972	Marshall
26	Sir Basil Arthur		8 December 1972	12 December 1975	Kirk
26	Sir Basil Arthur		8 December 1972	12 December 1975	Rowling
27	Bert Walker		12 December 1975	13 December 1978	Muldoon
28	Derek Quigley		13 December 1978	15 June 1982	Muldoon
29	Keith Allen		15 June 1982	26 July 1984	Muldoon
30	Phil Goff		26 July 1984	6 April 1987	Lange
31	Kerry Burke		6 April 1987	24 July 1987	Lange
32	Richard Prebble		15 August 1987	4 November 1988	Lange
33	David Lange		4 November 1988	8 November 1988	Lange
34	Bill Jeffries		8 November 1988	8 August 1989	Lange
35	Stan Rodger		8 August 1989	9 February 1990	Palmer
36	Richard Prebble		9 February 1990	2 November 1990	Palmer
36	Richard Prebble		9 February 1990	2 November 1990	Moore
