= Rangiora (electorate) =

Rangiora is a former New Zealand parliamentary electorate, based on the town of Rangiora.

== Population centres ==
The electorate is based on the town of Rangiora and the surrounding rural area, and is north of Christchurch in North Canterbury.

== History ==
The electorate existed from 1963 (when it replaced the Hurunui electorate) until 1996, when with mixed-member proportional (MMP) representation it was absorbed into the new Waimakariri electorate.

The electorate is semi-rural and was represented by the National Party except for the 1972–1975 period. Derek Quigley was a National MP who was opposed to the interventionist policies of Muldoon's Third National Government. He resigned from Cabinet in 1982, and left Parliament in 1984.

=== Members of Parliament ===
Key National Labour

| Election | Winner |
|---|---|
| 1963 election | Lorrie Pickering |
| 1966 election | Lorrie Pickering |
| 1969 election | Lorrie Pickering |
| 1972 election | Kerry Burke |
| 1975 election | Derek Quigley |
| 1978 election | Derek Quigley |
| 1981 election | Derek Quigley |
| 1984 election | Jim Gerard |
| 1987 election | Jim Gerard |
| 1990 election | Jim Gerard |
| 1993 election | Jim Gerard |
(Electorate abolished in 1996; see Waimakariri)

== Election results ==
=== 1993 election ===
1993 general election: Rangiora
| Party | Candidate | Votes | % | ±% |
|---|---|---|---|---|
| National | Jim Gerard | 9,157 | 44.71 | |
| Labour | Maureen Little | 4,688 | 22.89 | |
| Alliance | John Wright | 4,611 | 22.51 | |
| NZ First | Rodney Woods | 1,397 | 6.82 | |
| Christian Heritage | Judith Phillips | 450 | 2.20 | |
| McGillicuddy Serious | Richard Woolfe | 125 | 0.61 | |
| Natural Law | John Kennedy Bird | 52 | 0.25 | |
| Majority | | 4,469 | 21.82 | |
| Turnout | | 20,816 | | |
| Registered electors | | | | |

=== 1990 election ===
1990 general election: Rangiora
| Party | Candidate | Votes | % | ±% |
|---|---|---|---|---|
| National | Jim Gerard | 11,135 | 51.84 | |
| Labour | Judith McLachlan | 5,862 | 27.29 | |
| Independent | Kevin Boyce | 1,530 | 7.12 | |
| Green | Togs Parsonson | 1,458 | 6.79 | |
| NewLabour Party | Ivan Finlayson | 1,084 | 5.05 | |
| Democrats | John Wright | 255 | 1.19 | |
| Social Credit | Marguerite Woodthorpe | 94 | 0.44 | |
| McGillicuddy Serious | Richard Wolfe | 62 | 0.29 | |
| Majority | | 5,273 | 24.55 | |
| Turnout | | | | |
| Registered electors | | | | |

=== 1987 election ===
1987 general election: Rangiora
| Party | Candidate | Votes | % | ±% |
|---|---|---|---|---|
| National | Jim Gerard | 11,413 | 52.79 | +10.2 |
| Labour | Chris Constable | 9,281 | 42.93 | +2.0 |
| Democrats | Graham Moore | 756 | 3.50 | −0.4 |
| NZ Party | John McCaskey | 171 | 0.79 | −11.8 |
| Majority | | 2,123 | 9.82 | |
| Turnout | | | 91.06 | |
| Registered electors | | 23,743 | | |

=== 1984 election ===
1984 general election: Rangiora
| Party | Candidate | Votes | % | ±% |
|---|---|---|---|---|
| National | Jim Gerard | 8,895 | 42.7 | −4.0 |
| Labour | Brian Tomlinson | 8,549 | 40.9 | −1.5 |
| NZ Party | Bill Gardner | 2,631 | 12.6 | +12.6 |
| Social Credit | Graham Moore | 820 | 3.9 | −7.1 |
| Majority | | 346 | 1.7 | |
| Turnout | | | 95.2 | |
| Registered electors | | 22,257 | | |

=== 1981 election ===
1981 general election: Rangiora
| Party | Candidate | Votes | % | ±% |
|---|---|---|---|---|
| National | Derek Quigley | 10,472 | 46.6 | +0.2 |
| Labour | Chris Hayward | 9,540 | 42.4 | +1.4 |
| Social Credit | William Morgan | 2,470 | 11.0 | +0.5 |
| Majority | | 932 | 4.2 | |
| Turnout | | | 92.6 | |
| Registered electors | | 24,362 | | |

=== 1978 election ===
1978 general election: Rangiora
| Party | Candidate | Votes | % | ±% |
|---|---|---|---|---|
| National | Derek Quigley | 9,729 | 46.4 | −3.4 |
| Labour | Don McKenzie | 8,584 | 41.0 | −2.3 |
| Social Credit | Alf Barwood | 2,195 | 10.5 | +7.5 |
| Values | Richard Schluter | 433 | 2.1 | −1.8 |
| Majority | | 1,145 | 5.4 | |
| Turnout | | | 77.3 | |
| Registered electors | | 27,181 | | |

=== 1975 election ===
1975 general election: Rangiora
| Party | Candidate | Votes | % | ±% |
|---|---|---|---|---|
| National | Derek Quigley | 10,499 | 49.8 | +5.5 |
| Labour | Kerry Burke | 9,113 | 43.3 | −6.2 |
| Values | Wren Green | 820 | 3.9 | +2.9 |
| Social Credit | Jim Fountain | 633 | 3.0 | −0.9 |
| Majority | | 1,386 | 6.5 | |
| Turnout | | | 89.0 | |
| Registered electors | | 23,733 | | |

=== 1972 election ===
1972 general election: Rangiora
| Party | Candidate | Votes | % | ±% |
|---|---|---|---|---|
| Labour | Kerry Burke | 8,245 | 49.5 | +6.5 |
| National | Adrian Hiatt | 7,379 | 44.3 | −5.2 |
| Social Credit | Jim Fountain | 645 | 3.9 | −3.8 |
| Values | Arthur Calvin Peters | 161 | 1.0 | +1.0 |
| Liberal Reform | John McCaskey | 118 | 0.7 | +0.7 |
| New Democratic | Lawrence James Gray | 55 | 0.3 | +0.3 |
| Union Movement | Owen Victor Beaumont | 49 | 0.3 | +0.3 |
| Majority | | 1,386 | 6.5 | |
| Turnout | | | 89.0 | |
| Registered electors | | 23,733 | | |

=== 1969 election ===
1969 general election: Rangiora
| Party | Candidate | Votes | % | ±% |
|---|---|---|---|---|
| National | Lorrie Pickering | 8,428 | 49.5 | +1.6 |
| Labour | Paul Piesse | 7,285 | 42.8 | +1.1 |
| Social Credit | Louise Moore | 1,314 | 7.7 | −2.7 |
| Majority | | 1,143 | 6.7 | |
| Turnout | | | 89.9 | |
| Registered electors | | 19,059 | | |

=== 1966 election ===
1966 general election: Rangiora
| Party | Candidate | Votes | % | ±% |
|---|---|---|---|---|
| National | Lorrie Pickering | 7,338 | 47.9 | −3.4 |
| Labour | Te Rino Tirikatene | 6,381 | 41.7 | +0.1 |
| Social Credit | John Bere | 1,598 | 10.4 | +3.3 |
| Majority | | 957 | 6.2 | |
| Turnout | | | 88.5 | |
| Registered electors | | 17,424 | | |

=== 1963 election ===
1963 general election: Rangiora
| Party | Candidate | Votes | % | ±% |
|---|---|---|---|---|
| National | Lorrie Pickering | 7,556 | 51.3 | |
| Labour | Te Rino Tirikatene | 6,131 | 41.6 | |
| Social Credit | Jack Clark | 1,040 | 7.1 | |
| Majority | | 1,425 | 9.7 | |
| Turnout | | | 89.9 | |
| Registered electors | | 16,466 | | |
