= Waitahu River =

Coordinates: 42°04′S 171°49′E

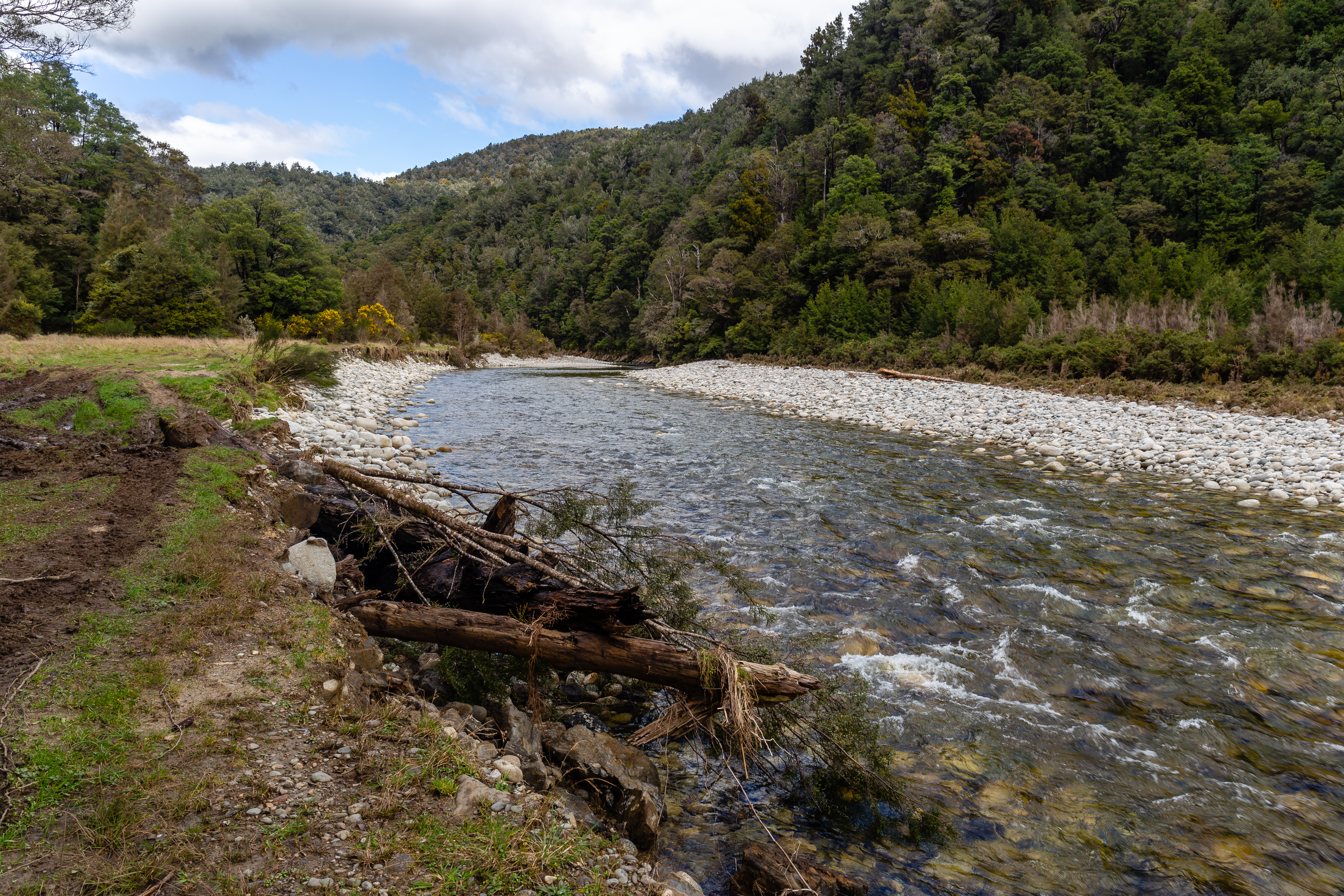

Location
- Country: New Zealand

Physical characteristics
- Mouth
  - location: Inangahua River
- Length: 34 km (21 mi)

The Waitahu River is a river of the West Coast Region of New Zealand's South Island. It flows generally northwest from its source in the Victoria Range to reach the Inangahua River five kilometres north of Reefton.

== See also ==
- List of rivers of New Zealand
