= Te Wharau River =

Coordinates: 41.998093°S 171.885955°E

Te Wharau or Stony River

Location
- Country: New Zealand

Physical characteristics
- Source
  - location: Paparoa Range
- Mouth
  - location: Inangahua River
- Length: 21 km (13 mi)

The Te Wharau or Stony River is a river of the West Coast Region of New Zealand's South Island. It flows generally east from its sources in the Paparoa Range to reach the Inangahua River 15 kilometres north of Reefton.

== See also ==
- List of rivers of New Zealand
- Hangatahua River
