= Inangahua Junction =

Settlement on the West Coast of the South Island of New Zealand

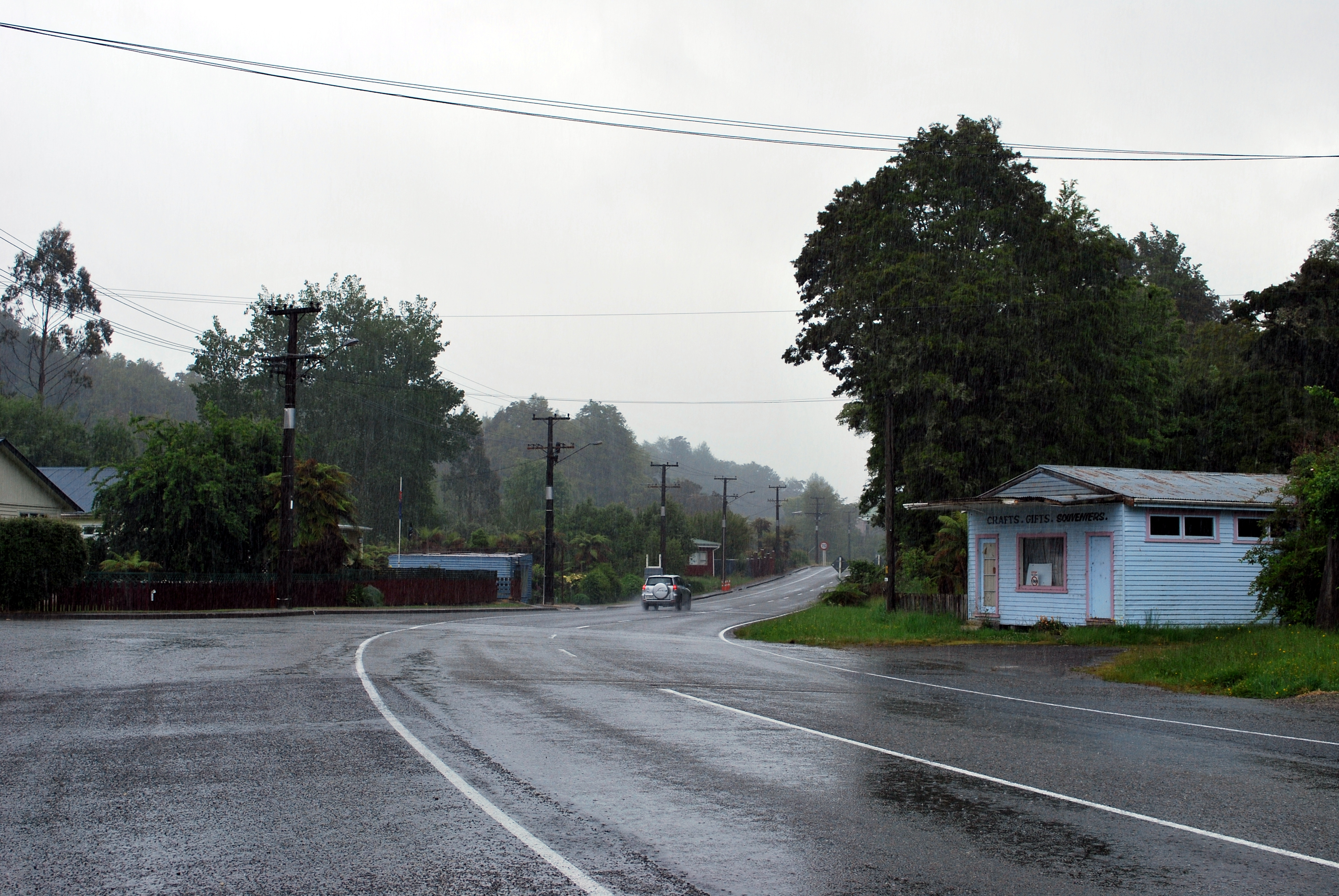
- State Highway 6 passing through Inangahua Junction
- Interactive map of Inangahua Junction
- Coordinates: 41°51′27″S 171°57′8″E
- Country: New Zealand
- Region: West Coast
- District: Buller District
- Community board: Inangahua Community Board
- Ward: Inangahua
- Electorates: West Coast-Tasman; Te Tai Tonga

Government
  - Territorial authority: Buller District Council
  - Regional council: West Coast Regional Council
  - Mayor of Buller: Chris Russell
  - West Coast-Tasman MP: Katie Milne
  - Te Tai Tonga MP: Mananui Ramsden

Area
  - Total: 412.43 km^{2} (159.24 sq mi)

Population (2018 Census)
  - Total: 102
  - Density: 0.247/km^{2} (0.641/sq mi)

Inangahua is a small settlement in the northwest of New Zealand's South Island. It consists of three settled areas: Inangahua Junction at the confluence of the Inangahua and Buller Rivers, 34 kilometres (21 mi) north of Reefton and 46 kilometres (29 mi) southeast of Westport; Inangahua Landing, 10 km further up the Inangahua River; and Inangahua township, 2 km east of the Junction. Murchison is 52 kilometres (32 mi) further east. After the 1968 Inangahua Earthquake, most of the inhabitants left the area or shifted to the township, which is now the population centre and known simply as Inangahua.

Inangahua's main industries include forestry, coal, farming and sawmilling. There is a fire station.

== Name ==
The name of the town refers to inanga, the Māori word for whitebait (Galaxias spp.) and hua, the act of drying and preserving them in sealed containers; the river was known for its abundance of fish. Inangahua Junction was formerly known as Christies Junction.

== Inangahua Landing ==
Before the construction of the Buller Gorge road, the only way to travel inland from Westport was by river. At the beginning of the West Coast gold rush, mining equipment and quartz-crushing machinery was ferried up the Buller River to its confluence with the Inangahua, then about 10 km up the Inangahua as far as "The Landing", from which it was transported overland south to Reefton. At the height of the gold rush over 1000 prospectors were working in tributaries of the Inangahua.

== Earthquake ==
The town was substantially affected by an earthquake on Friday, 24 May 1968. At 5:24 am, the earthquake measuring 7.1 on the Richter scale struck the town, and many landslides and aftershocks followed. The entire population of around 100 was temporarily evacuated. There were no fatalities in the town, but a woman and her visiting mother were killed when the house they were in, along the Inangahua Junction to Westport road, was crushed by a landslide on the cliffs above their house, while a man died near Greymouth when his car hit a section of road on that suddenly subsided on the run-up to a bridge. Another three died days later when a helicopter surveying downed telephone lines crashed.

== Demographics ==
Inangahua Junction locality, which includes Lyell, covers 412.43 km^{2} (159.24 sq mi) It is part of the larger Inangahua statistical area.

Historical population of Inangahua Junction and surrounds
Year	Pop.	±% p.a.
2006	159	—
2013	144	−1.41%
2018	102	−6.66%
2023	117	+2.78%

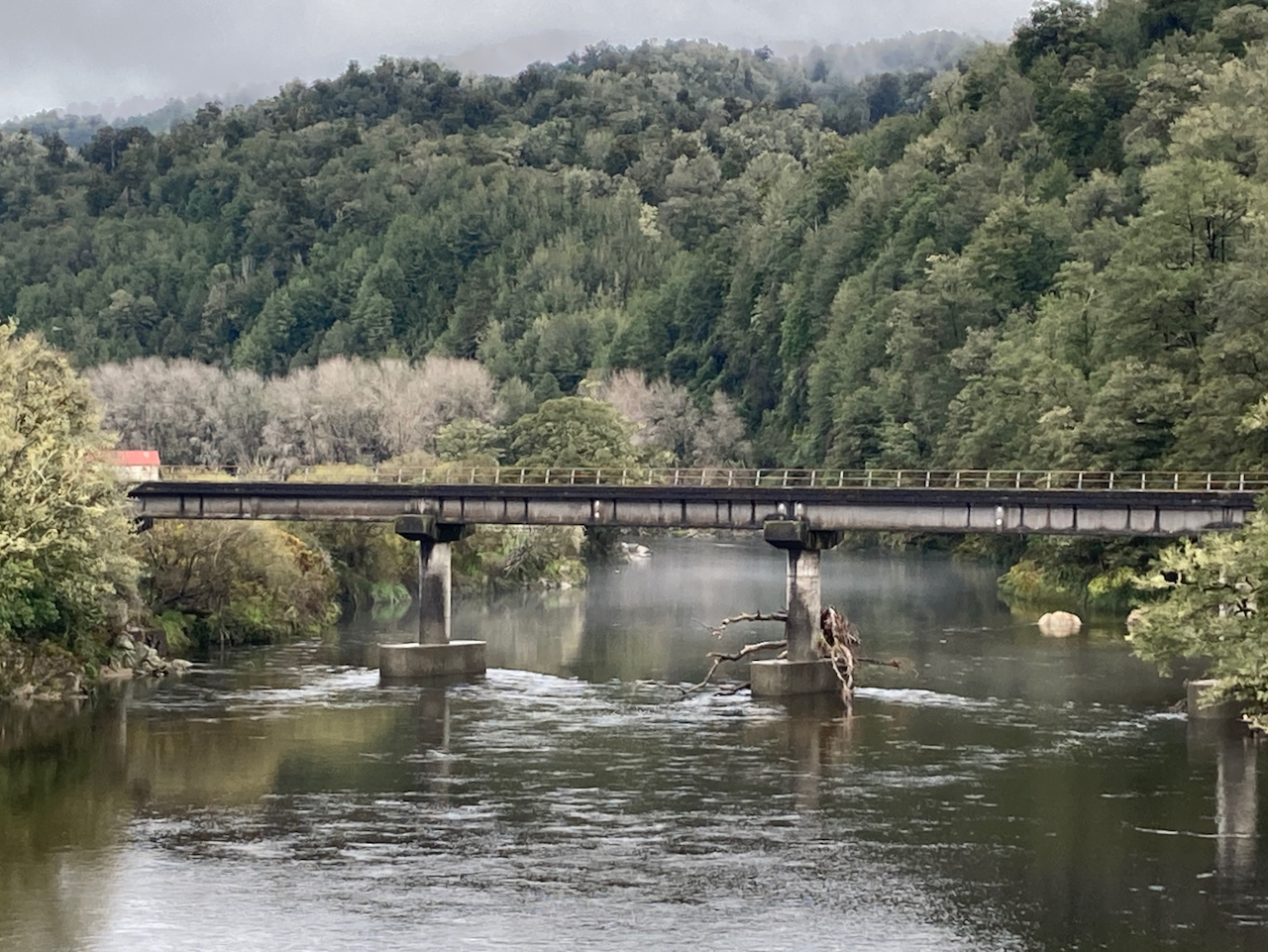
Rail bridge at Inangahua Landing

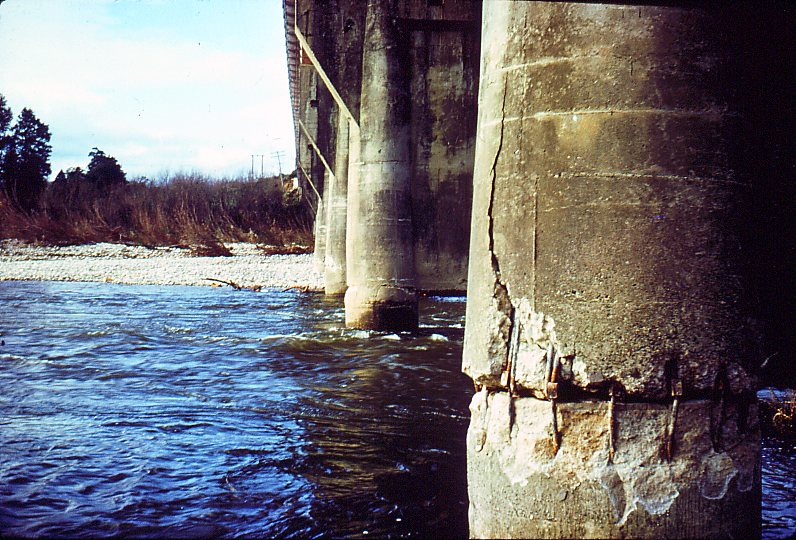
Inangahua Junction bridge after the 1968 earthquake

The locality had a population of 117 in the 2023 New Zealand census, an increase of 15 people (14.7%) since the 2018 census, and a decrease of 27 people (−18.8%) since the 2013 census. There were 66 males and 48 females in 78 dwellings. 2.6% of people identified as LGBTIQ+. The median age was 49.2 years (compared with 38.1 years nationally). There were 12 people (10.3%) aged under 15 years, 15 (12.8%) aged 15 to 29, 63 (53.8%) aged 30 to 64, and 24 (20.5%) aged 65 or older.

People could identify as more than one ethnicity. The results were 89.7% European (Pākehā); 10.3% Māori; 5.1% Middle Eastern, Latin American and African New Zealanders (MELAA); and 5.1% other, which includes people giving their ethnicity as "New Zealander". English was spoken by 97.4%, Māori by 2.6%, and other languages by 5.1%. No language could be spoken by 2.6% (e.g. too young to talk). The percentage of people born overseas was 17.9, compared with 28.8% nationally.

Religious affiliations were 20.5% Christian, 2.6% New Age, and 2.6% other religions. People who answered that they had no religion were 69.2%, and 7.7% of people did not answer the census question.

Of those at least 15 years old, 6 (5.7%) people had a bachelor's or higher degree, 57 (54.3%) had a post-high school certificate or diploma, and 39 (37.1%) people exclusively held high school qualifications. The median income was $20,400, compared with $41,500 nationally. 3 people (2.9%) earned over $100,000 compared to 12.1% nationally. The employment status of those at least 15 was 27 (25.7%) full-time, 15 (14.3%) part-time, and 6 (5.7%) unemployed.

=== Inangahua statistical area ===
Inangahua statistical area, which surrounds but does not include Reefton, covers 3,195.94 km^{2} (1,233.96 sq mi) and had an estimated population of 910 as of June 2025, with a population density of 0.28 people per km^{2}.

Historical population for the statistical area
Year	Pop.	±% p.a.
2006	981	—
2013	1,011	+0.43%
2018	864	−3.09%
2023	906	+0.95%

Inangahua statistical area had a population of 906 in the 2023 New Zealand census, an increase of 42 people (4.9%) since the 2018 census, and a decrease of 105 people (−10.4%) since the 2013 census. There were 471 males, 432 females, and 3 people of other genders in 447 dwellings. 2.0% of people identified as LGBTIQ+. The median age was 44.0 years (compared with 38.1 years nationally). There were 156 people (17.2%) aged under 15 years, 123 (13.6%) aged 15 to 29, 453 (50.0%) aged 30 to 64, and 174 (19.2%) aged 65 or older.

People could identify as more than one ethnicity. The results were 90.4% European (Pākehā); 10.6% Māori; 0.7% Pasifika; 4.6% Asian; 1.7% Middle Eastern, Latin American and African New Zealanders (MELAA); and 3.3% other, which includes people giving their ethnicity as "New Zealander". English was spoken by 97.0%, Māori by 2.0%, and other languages by 5.3%. No language could be spoken by 2.3% (e.g. too young to talk). New Zealand Sign Language was known by 0.3%. The percentage of people born overseas was 15.2, compared with 28.8% nationally.

Religious affiliations were 21.9% Christian, 1.3% Hindu, 0.3% Islam, 0.3% Māori religious beliefs, 0.3% Buddhist, 0.3% New Age, and 1.3% other religions. People who answered that they had no religion were 65.6%, and 9.3% of people did not answer the census question.

Of those at least 15 years old, 69 (9.2%) people had a bachelor's or higher degree, 435 (58.0%) had a post-high school certificate or diploma, and 243 (32.4%) people exclusively held high school qualifications. The median income was $31,400, compared with $41,500 nationally. 39 people (5.2%) earned over $100,000 compared to 12.1% nationally. The employment status of those at least 15 was 357 (47.6%) full-time, 99 (13.2%) part-time, and 30 (4.0%) unemployed.

== Railways ==
Inangahua Junction is located on the Stillwater - Westport Line railway, and was intended to be the junction of this line with the never-completed Nelson Section. In 1914, the railway was opened to Inangahua Junction from its former terminus in Cronadun, but subsequent progress through the Buller Gorge was slow. In July 1942, trains began running the full length of the line between Stillwater and Westport, but the line was not officially opened until 5 December 1943. With the commencement of through services, passenger trains were operated by RM class Vulcan railcars, which connected in Stillwater with services that ran along the Midland Line between Greymouth and Christchurch. In 1967, the passenger services ceased, and today, the primary traffic is coal, with multiple coal trains passing through Inangahua Junction daily. Today the town is served by the daily inter city bus between Nelson and Westport.

== PHAT Music Festival ==
Inangahua was the host of the PHAT New Year's Eve music festivals. PHAT07, PHAT08, PHAT09, PHAT10 (with Australian band Pendulum and NZers Black Seeds, Kora, Salmonella Dub, Tiki and Concord Dawn), PHAT11 featured New Zealand and many international acts. PHAT is held on flat clearings surrounded by native bush on Rough Creek Road, off Browns Creek Road, south of Inangahua and owned by the Storer family. Approximately 5000 people attend the PHAT music festivals, with 48+ hours of continuous performance on two stages.

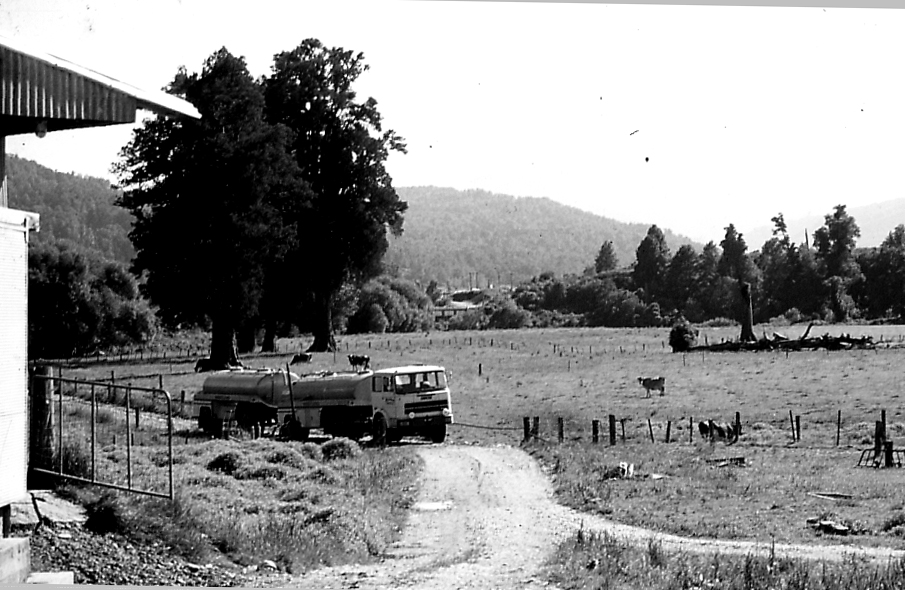
The milk tanker arrives, Inangahua Junction 1978.

The other annual event held on the Inangahua site was PHAT MOON, a slightly smaller version of the bigger New Year's Eve's event.

PHAT MOON was held over Easter weekend. The music runs for 24 hours, but people are invited to come and camp the night before. This ceased quite a few years ago; the site has returned to being a farm.

== Education ==
Inangahua Junction School was a coeducational contributing primary (years 1–6) school. The school was in existence in 1887. It closed in 2018.

Inangahua College merged with Reefton School to form Reefton Area School in 2004. The College, which existed for 38 years, replaced the Reefton District High School.
