= Larry (rapper) =

French rapper (born 1998)

- Born: Abdelmalik Yahyaoui; 10 February 1998 (age 28); Strasbourg, France
- Genre: Hip hop
- Occupation: Rapper
- Years active: 2018-present
- Labels: Gothvm Records; Sony Music; Columbia Records

Abdelmalik Yahyaoui (Arabic: عبد المالك يحياوي, born 10 February 1998), better known by the stage name Larry, is a French rapper of Moroccan descent. Most famous for his song "Woin Woin" featuring rapper RK, he released his album Cité blanche in 2020. He is signed to Columbia Records in addition to running his own label, Gothvm Records.

== Career ==
Yahyaoui grew up in Elsau suburb of Strasbourg and was active in many sports including football, boxing, judo. He also was part of a hip hop dance group. His father Badr Yahyaoui worked in arts and became his manager, and his mother Soumia Yahyaoui working in restaurant became is responsible for signings and the company's record label Gothvm Records. Larry started rapping at 19 and posted a number of freestyle materials he called Freeberiz on Instagram and was dedicated to one of his close friends imprisoned at the time. Encouraged by the success, he established his record label Gothvm Records releasing more freestyles in 2019. After releasing a few tracks, like "Pasta", "Beatles" and "Gamme" and freestyle series "Abattue" and the singles "Gaz" and "Sacoche" in June 2019, he gained huge viewing on social networks.

Larry signed with Sony Music and affiliate Columbia Records with whom he released notably "Woin Woin" in collaboration with French rapper RK that became his biggest charting single in France and Belgium and certified platinum in France. It also earned him a performance at Planète Rock on Skyrock where he performed freestyles for a full week with guests Rémy, RK and 100 Blaze. He released further freestyle materials with Booska-P followed by his studio album Cité blanche on 31 January 2020, that peaked at number 6 in French albums chart. Cité blanche (meaning white city in French) refers to the traffic of cocaine in the French suburbs. The album was certified gold in August 2020. He also toured in France, Belgium and Switzerland for promoting the album.

== Discography ==
=== Albums ===
Year	Title	Peak positions		Certification
Year	Title	FRA	BEL (Wa)	Certification
2020	Cité blanche	6	8	SNEP: Gold
2021	Petit Prince	—	48	

=== Singles ===
Year	Title	Peak positions		Album
Year	Title	FRA	BEL (Wa)	Album
2019	"Sacoche"	141		Cite blanche
2019	"Gaz"	172		
2019	"Woin Woin" (feat. RK)	8	41	Cité blanche
2019	"Block"	50		
2020	"Question réponse"	61		Cité blanche
2020	"Routine"	58		Non-album release
2021	"Booster"	130		Non-album release
2021	"Sirène"	67		Non-album release
2021	"Noblabla"	150		Non-album release
2021	"Double L" (with Leto)	43		Non-album release

=== Featured in ===
Year	Title	Peak positions		Album
Year	Title	FRA	BEL (Wa)	Album
2020	"Grand Paris 2" (Médine feat. Koba LaD, Pirate, Larry, Oxmo Puccino & Rémy)	51		

Other collaborations

- 2018: Eafia & Larry - "Mbappé"
- 2019: DJ Weedim feat. Larry - "Eazy Mélo"
- 2020: Rémy feat. Larry - "Grammes" (on the soundtrack of Validé)
- 2020: Shotas feat. Larry - "B" (on muxtape Capuché 2 by Shotas)
- 2020: 24kGoldn feat. Larry - "City of Angels" (Larry Remix)
- 2020: Ashafar feat. Larry - "Medellín"

=== Other charting songs ===
Year	Album	Peak positions		Album
Year	Album	FRA	BEL (Wa)	Album
2020	"Enfant compliqué"	70		Cité blanche
2020	"Cité blanche"	79		Cité blanche
2020	"En bas"	114		Cité blanche
2020	"Hey boy"	137		Cité blanche
2020	"Tieks"	146		Cité blanche
2020	"Cocaina"	148		Cité blanche
2020	"Maman me disait"	171		Cité blanche
2020	"Paye"	106		Non-album release

Other releases

- 2018: Freeberiz #1, #2, #3, #4
- 2018: "Cible" (Hors-Série #1)
- 2018: "Bling" (on the compilation Favelas II)
- 2018: "Abattue" (Hors-Série #2)
- 2019: "Pasta"
- 2019: "Hood"
- 2019: "Booska Beriz"
- 2019: "Gamme"
- 2019: "Beatles"
