= Andrew Rutherford (politician) =

New Zealand politician

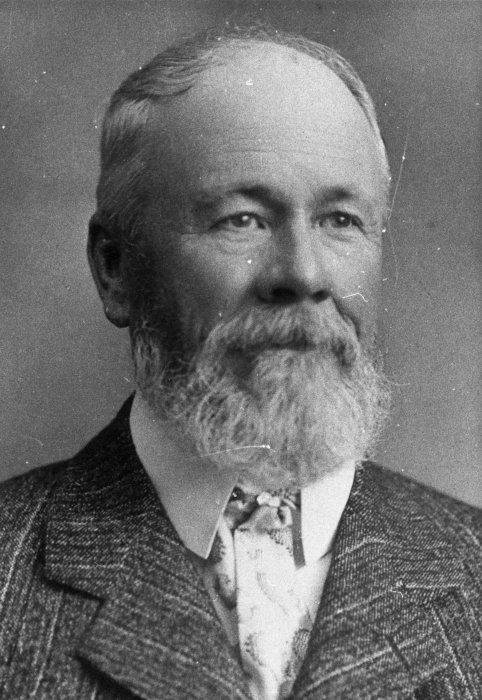

Member of the New Zealand Parliament for Hurunui
- In office 25 November 1902 – 17 November 1908
- Preceded by: New constituency
- Succeeded by: George Forbes

Personal details
- Born: Andrew William Rutherford; 9 March 1842 Tumut, New South Wales
- Died: 11 November 1918 (aged 76) Christchurch, New Zealand
- Party: Liberal
- Spouse: Jane Monk (m. 1873)
- Children: 10

Andrew William Rutherford (9 March 1842 – 11 November 1918) was a Liberal Party Member of Parliament in New Zealand.

== Biography ==
=== Early life ===
Rutherford was born in 1842 in New South Wales, probably near Tumut, to Scottish parents. He received his education in Brighton, a suburb of Adelaide. He came to New Zealand on 1 January 1860 on the Gundreda with his father and his brother to take up a farm. In 1862, he took charge of another farm, Mendip Hills, on behalf of his father and of Alfred Domett. On 3 November 1873, he married Jane Monk at Waiau. His wife, 15 at the time of their marriage, was to have six sons and four daughters.

=== Political career ===
New Zealand Parliament
Years	Term	Electorate	Party
1902–1905	15th	Hurunui	Liberal
1905–1908	16th	Hurunui	Liberal

Rutherford represented the Amuri electorate on the Nelson Provincial Council from 1869 to 1871. He won the Hurunui electorate, which replaced the Ashley electorate, in the 1902 general election, defeating Richard Meredith, who had previously represented the Ashley electorate and was also of the Liberal Party. He held the electorate until he retired in 1908.

Rutherford died during the 1918 flu pandemic on 11 November in Christchurch. He was buried at Waiau cemetery. His wife survived him by several decades and died in 1955.

New Zealand Parliament
New constituency	Member of Parliament for Hurunui; 1902–1908	Succeeded by George Forbes
