= Levels, New Zealand =

Levels
- Rural Area
- Interactive map of Levels
- Coordinates: 44.29873°S 171.22250°E
- Country: New Zealand
- Region: Canterbury
- Territorial authority: Timaru District
- Ward: Pleasant Point-Temuka Ward; Timaru Ward
- Community: Pleasant Point
- Electorates: Rangitata; Te Tai Tonga (Māori)

Government
  - Territorial authority: Timaru District Council
  - Regional council: Environment Canterbury
  - Mayor of Timaru: Nigel Bowen
  - Rangitata MP: James Meager
  - Te Tai Tonga MP: Tākuta Ferris

Area
  - Total: 87.99 km^{2} (33.97 sq mi)
- Elevation: 25 m (82 ft)

Population (June 2025)
  - Total: 1,270
  - Density: 14.4/km^{2} (37.4/sq mi)
- Time zone: UTC+12 (NZST)
  - Summer (DST): UTC+13 (NZDT)
- Postcode: 7975
- Area code: 03
- Local iwi: Ngāi Tahu

Levels is a small rural community in the Timaru District, New Zealand. It is located east of Pleasant Point and north-west of Timaru. Richard Pearse Airport is located within Levels. Also, the Timaru International Motor Raceway is located in the area.

== Demographics ==
The Levels statistical area, which also includes Kerrytown and Waipopo, covers 87.99 km^{2} (33.97 sq mi) and had an estimated population of 1,270 as of June 2025, with a population density of 14 people per km^{2}.

Historical population
Year	Pop.	±% p.a.
2006	1,128	—
2013	1,134	+0.08%
2018	1,209	+1.29%
2023	1,245	+0.59%

Levels had a population of 1,245 in the 2023 New Zealand census, an increase of 36 people (3.0%) since the 2018 census, and an increase of 111 people (9.8%) since the 2013 census. There were 663 males, 576 females, and 6 people of other genders in 471 dwellings. 1.9% of people identified as LGBTIQ+. The median age was 48.9 years (compared with 38.1 years nationally). There were 192 people (15.4%) aged under 15 years, 171 (13.7%) aged 15 to 29, 609 (48.9%) aged 30 to 64, and 270 (21.7%) aged 65 or older.

People could identify as more than one ethnicity. The results were 90.1% European (Pākehā); 11.3% Māori; 1.2% Pasifika; 2.4% Asian; 0.7% Middle Eastern, Latin American and African New Zealanders (MELAA); and 5.8% other, which includes people giving their ethnicity as "New Zealander". English was spoken by 98.8%, Māori by 2.2%, Samoan by 0.2%, and other languages by 4.1%. No language could be spoken by 1.2% (e.g. too young to talk). New Zealand Sign Language was known by 0.5%. The percentage of people born overseas was 8.9, compared with 28.8% nationally.

Religious affiliations were 36.4% Christian, 0.5% Islam, 0.5% Māori religious beliefs, 0.2% Buddhist, 0.2% New Age, and 0.5% other religions. People who answered that they had no religion were 51.6%, and 10.4% of people did not answer the census question.

Of those at least 15 years old, 132 (12.5%) people had a bachelor's or higher degree, 678 (64.4%) had a post-high school certificate or diploma, and 246 (23.4%) people exclusively held high school qualifications. The median income was $42,600, compared with $41,500 nationally. 135 people (12.8%) earned over $100,000 compared to 12.1% nationally. The employment status of those at least 15 was 564 (53.6%) full-time, 156 (14.8%) part-time, and 15 (1.4%) unemployed.

== See also ==
- Levels Valley
