= Cronadun =

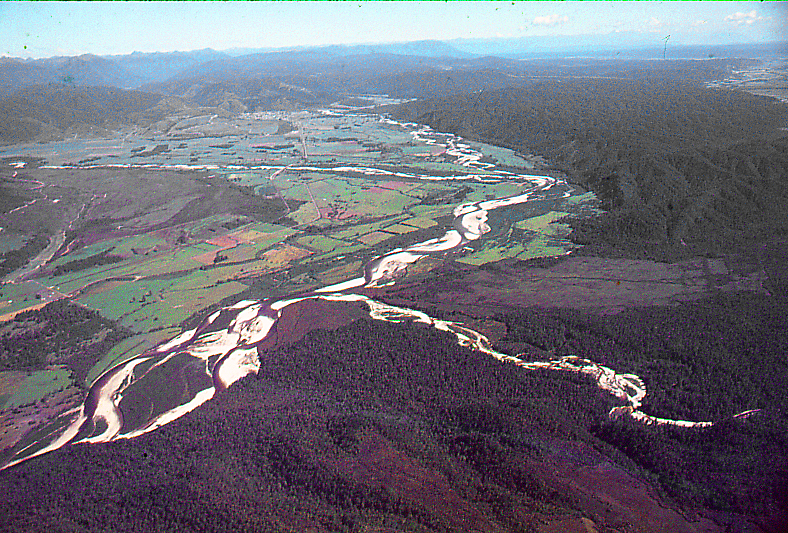
- Inangahua Valley looking south, Cronadun at far left

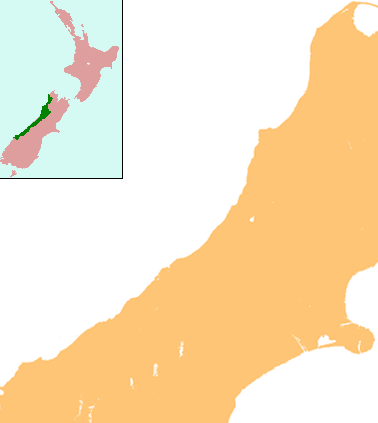
- Location within West Coast
- Coordinates: 42°1′46″S 171°51′47″E
- Country: New Zealand
- Region: West Coast
- District: Buller District
- Electorates: West Coast-Tasman; Te Tai Tonga

Cronadun is a small village located in the West Coast region of New Zealand's South Island. It is situated on the east bank of the Inangahua River, near its junction with Boatmans Creek. SH 69 and the Stillwater–Westport Line railway pass through the village.

== Name ==
Sometimes recorded as Cronaden and Cronadon, the locality was named by three brothers – Timothy, John, and Dominic Gallagher – after their home in County Donegal. Crough na dun (Irish:Cró na Doinne) means "hill of the fort", and Anglicised is Cronadun.

== History ==
In 1901 Cronadun had a population of 39, with a hotel, post office, store, and telephone bureau.

== Demographics ==
Cronadun and its environs cover 478.77 km^{2} (184.85 sq mi) It is part of the larger Inangahua statistical area.

Historical population
Year	Pop.	±% p.a.
2006	144	—
2013	135	−0.92%
2018	123	−1.84%
2023	117	−1.00%

The area had a population of 117 in the 2023 New Zealand census, a decrease of 6 people (−4.9%) since the 2018 census, and a decrease of 18 people (−13.3%) since the 2013 census. There were 54 males and 63 females in 51 dwellings. The median age was 38.1 years (compared with 38.1 years nationally). There were 30 people (25.6%) aged under 15 years, 18 (15.4%) aged 15 to 29, 54 (46.2%) aged 30 to 64, and 18 (15.4%) aged 65 or older.

People could identify as more than one ethnicity. The results were 92.3% European (Pākehā), 10.3% Māori, 2.6% Pasifika, and 2.6% Asian. English was spoken by 94.9%, Māori by 2.6%, and other languages by 5.1%. No language could be spoken by 2.6% (e.g. too young to talk). The percentage of people born overseas was 15.4, compared with 28.8% nationally.

Religious affiliations were 28.2% Christian, and 2.6% other religions. People who answered that they had no religion were 64.1%, and 7.7% of people did not answer the census question.

Of those at least 15 years old, 12 (13.8%) people had a bachelor's or higher degree, 48 (55.2%) had a post-high school certificate or diploma, and 30 (34.5%) people exclusively held high school qualifications. The median income was $28,900, compared with $41,500 nationally. 3 people (3.4%) earned over $100,000 compared to 12.1% nationally. The employment status of those at least 15 was 54 (62.1%) full-time, 6 (6.9%) part-time, and 6 (6.9%) unemployed.

== Railway ==
For a few years, Cronadun was the terminus of the Stillwater–Westport Line as construction progressed from Reefton alongside the Inangahua River towards the Buller Gorge. Cronadun became the terminus in 1908, and the next section to Inangahua Junction opened in 1914.
