= Basil Arthur =

New Zealand politician

The Honourable Sir Basil Arthur Bt
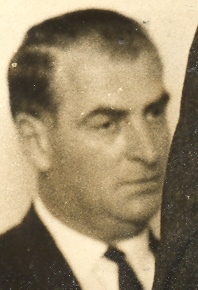

20th Speaker of the House of Representatives
- In office 14 July 1984 – 1 May 1985
- Prime Minister: David Lange
- Deputy: John Terris
- Preceded by: Richard Harrison
- Succeeded by: Gerry Wall

11th Minister of Transport
- In office 8 December 1972 – 12 December 1975
- Prime Minister: Norman Kirk; Bill Rowling
- Preceded by: Peter Gordon
- Succeeded by: Colin McLachlan

26th Minister in Charge of the State Insurance Office
- In office 8 December 1972 – 12 December 1975
- Prime Minister: Norman Kirk; Bill Rowling
- Preceded by: George Gair
- Succeeded by: Bert Walker

Member of the New Zealand Parliament for Timaru
- In office 21 July 1962 – 1 May 1985
- Preceded by: Clyde Carr
- Succeeded by: Maurice McTigue

Personal details
- Born: 18 September 1928 Timaru, New Zealand
- Died: 1 May 1985 (aged 56) Wellington, New Zealand
- Party: Labour
- Spouses: Beth Wells (m. 1950; div. 1983) Colleen Kennett (m. 1983)
- Children: 3
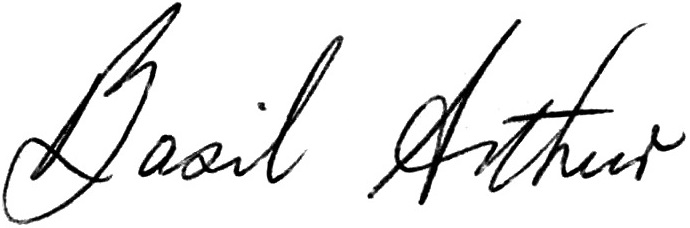
- Signature

Sir Basil Malcolm Arthur, 5th Baronet (18 September 1928 – 1 May 1985) served as Speaker of the New Zealand House of Representatives from 1984 to 1985. He was a member of the Labour Party.

== Biography ==
=== Early life and career ===
Arthur was born in Timaru, New Zealand, and educated at Timaru Boys' High School. As a youth he was a keen athlete and competed in representative rugby, badminton and hockey. Aged 15 he found work in Otago on a fishing trawler and later gained employment as a freezing worker. When he reached age 18, in 1947, he enlisted in the army and served for a year as a driver in J Force during the occupation of Japan.

He returned to New Zealand and found work as a hotel manager and on 5 January 1950 he married Elizabeth Rita Wells in Auckland. He soon after became a clerk for the Ministry of Works in Mangakino. Arthur had a preference for hard, physical activity and disliked clerical work. So he resigned three years later and worked in a series of labouring jobs subsequently. Whilst working in a sawmill, Arthur became secretary of the Waikato section of the New Zealand Workers' Union. In 1956 he was elected to the unions national executive, and served as president of the Auckland branch for three years. While working in Mangakino he was saving up in order to purchase his own business.

His father, a hotel proprietor, inherited the title of 4th Baronet in 1941, and Arthur in turn inherited it on his father's death in 1949. However, he deliberately made little use of his title. The title fitted uneasily with his lifestyle as a working man and he kept it hidden. It was not until the mid-1950s, by which time he was working as a concrete layer, that it became known that he was a baronet. Despite disliking the title he decided to keep it in case his eldest son, Stephen, wished to claim it and planned to take him to Kent to visit his ancestors' former land estates.

=== Member of Parliament ===
New Zealand Parliament
Years	Term	Electorate	Party
1962–1963	33rd	Timaru	Labour
1963–1966	34th	Timaru	Labour
1966–1969	35th	Timaru	Labour
1969–1972	36th	Timaru	Labour
1972–1975	37th	Timaru	Labour
1975–1978	38th	Timaru	Labour
1978–1981	39th	Timaru	Labour
1981–1984	40th	Timaru	Labour
1984–1985	41st	Timaru	Labour

Aged just 16, he joined the Labour Party and delivered its pamphlets during the 1946 election. He was president of the Mangakino branch of the Labour Party and vice-president of the Rotorua Labour Representation Committee. In 1957 Arthur decided to stand for parliament himself and unsuccessfully contested the Labour nomination for the Waitomo electorate, losing to Vic Haines the Mayor of Te Kūiti. In 1960 Arthur won nomination to stand for Labour in the Hamilton electorate, coming second.

In 1962, he contested two by-elections for the Labour Party: first, unsuccessfully, in Waitaki; then, successfully, in Timaru. On entering Parliament at age 33 he was the country's youngest member of parliament. He was reluctant to be called "Sir", but the Speaker at the time, Ronald Algie, said that refusing this honorific would be disrespectful to the Queen. In parliament he distinguished himself from colleagues by supporting New Zealand's involvement in the Vietnam War, which most of the Labour Party were opposed to.

=== Cabinet minister ===
Arthur was both Minister of Transport and Minister in Charge of the State Insurance Office from 1972 until 1975 during the Third Labour Government. As Minister of Transport he established the Shipping Corporation of New Zealand, which he later considered his greatest contribution to New Zealand. As Minister of State Insurance he instituted a 50% rebate on insurance premiums for means-tested beneficiaries.

Following the surprise defeat of the Third Labour Government he held the position of Opposition Spokesman for Transport and Communications. In 1979 he was appointed Shadow Minister of Agriculture and Fisheries by Labour leader Bill Rowling instead. He was additionally given the Forestry portfolio in 1982. He made a positive impression on colleagues and opponents leading the criticism of the controversial National Development Act and proposed reforms of national parks administration. His speeches in the House were "vigorous and forthright − without venom." During their period in opposition, Labour was beset by the perceived weakness of Rowling's leadership. Arthur was one of several speculated replacements. In contrast to Rowling, Arthur had a forceful presence in parliament and commanding voice (termed "Basil's Bellow").

When David Lange replaced Rowling as leader in 1983 Arthur was dropped from the front bench and lost the Agriculture and Forestry portfolios. He retained Fisheries and was made Shadow Minister for Lands and Rural Banking. By this time many parliamentary colleagues believed Arthur, with his length of service and poor health, belonged to the party's "old school of politicians".

=== Speaker ===
When Labour won the 1984 election Arthur, despite being one of only a few Labour MPs with prior cabinet experience, was passed over for a seat in the cabinet. Instead he was appointed Speaker of the New Zealand House of Representatives. He served in that capacity for one year, before dying in office of Legionnaires' disease. The then Prime Minister, David Lange recalled in My Life (2005) that Arthur was gravely ill in Wellington Hospital, and if he resigned from the member's superannuation scheme before he died (but not otherwise) his estate would get a lump-sum payment. He had to answer a question in the house, then went to hospital with a letter of resignation "only to find that he had died hardly a minute before I got there". Labour lost the subsequent Timaru by-election, with a candidate that did not suit "the conservative character of the electorate."

Arthur was the second baronet to serve as Speaker, the first being Sir Charles Clifford, 1st Baronet (the first Speaker of the House of Representatives), although he was made a baronet some time after he had retired from politics.

== Honours ==
In 1977, Arthur was awarded the Queen Elizabeth II Silver Jubilee Medal. The Timaru District Council named a recreation reserve, located in Washdyke, Sir Basil Arthur Park in his honour.

== Personal life ==
In May 1983, Arthur divorced his first wife Beth. He remarried to Sandra Colleen Kennett (née Boaz) on 1 July 1983 at a small ceremony in Wellington. He embarrassingly dropped the ring during the ceremony where his daughter-in-law Carolyn was the bridesmaid and Labour MP Bob Tizard was the best man. His first wife Beth died in 1997.

Coat of arms of Basil Arthur
Crest In front of two swords in saltire Proper pommels and hilts Or a pelican in her piety Sable the nest Or. Escutcheon Or on a chevron Azure between two clarions in chief Gules and a kangaroo sejant in base Proper two swords the points upwards also Proper points and hilts of the first on a chief of the third a horse courant Argent. Motto Stet Fortuna Domus (May The Fortune Of The House Stand)

== Notes ==
Political offices
Preceded by Richard Harrison	Speaker of the New Zealand House of Representatives; 1984–1985	Succeeded by Gerry Wall
Preceded by Peter Gordon	Minister of Transport; 1972–1975	Succeeded by Colin McLachlan
Preceded by George Gair	Minister in Charge of the State Insurance Office; 1972–1975	Succeeded by Bert Walker
New Zealand Parliament
Preceded by Clyde Carr	Member of Parliament for Timaru; 1962–1985	Succeeded by Maurice McTigue
Baronetage of the United Kingdom
Preceded by George Malcolm Arthur	Baronet (of Upper Canada); 1949–1985	Succeeded by Stephen Arthur
