= Inangahua River =

River in the South Island of New Zealand

Coordinates: 41°51′S 171°56′E

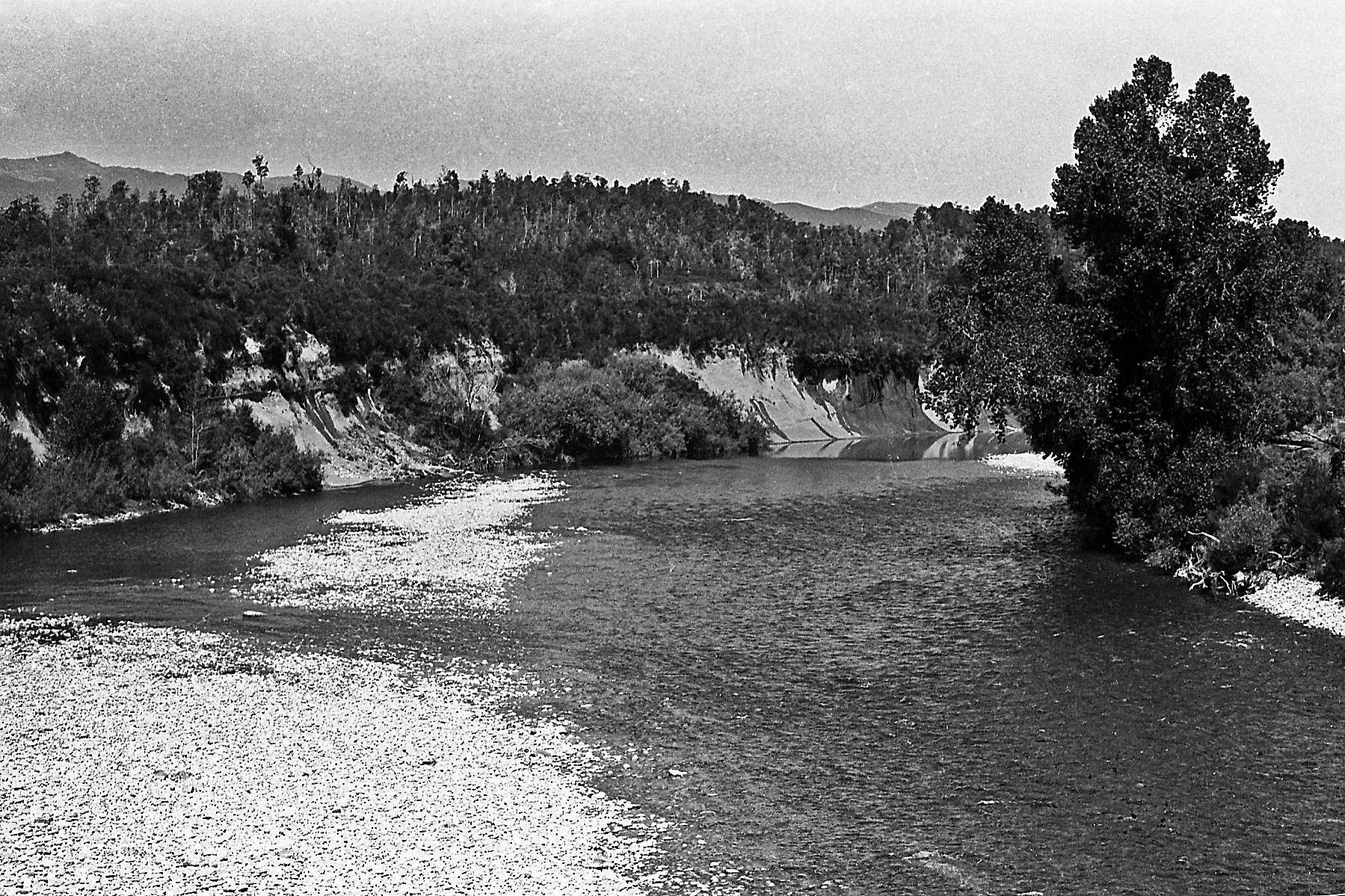
Inangahua River, 1976

The Inangahua River is located in the north-west of New Zealand's South Island. It is a major tributary of the Buller River, where it joins at the town of Inangahua Junction.

The Inangahua River begins near the Rahu Saddle and flows northwest for 35 kilometres (22 mi), followed by State Highway 7, to the town of Reefton. The Reefton Power Station, now decommissioned, operated with water taken from the river from 1888 to 1949. At Reefton it turns north and continues for 30 kilometres (19 mi), passing Cronadun, before reaching the Buller some 40 kilometres (25 mi) from the larger river's outflow into the Tasman Sea near Westport. The Inangahua's tributaries include the Waitahu River, Te Wharau River, and Awarau River.

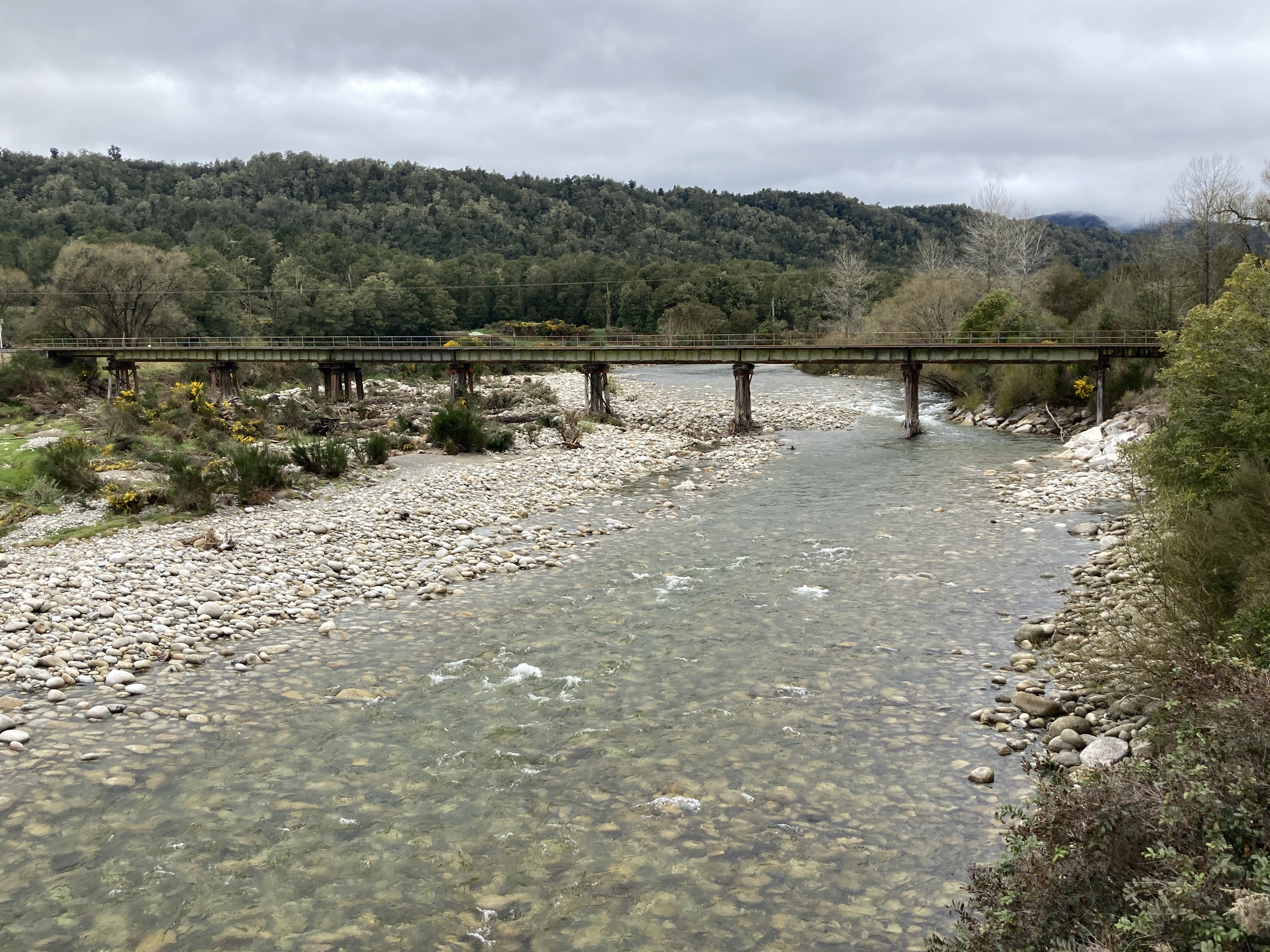
Awarau or Larry River, a tributary of the Inangahua River

The name Inangahua is from the Māori language; inanga means whitebait, small edible fish of Galaxias spp., and hua may mean the drying and preserving of them in sealed containers or may mean plenty of. The river was known for big catches of whitebait.

Prior to 1866 settlers sometimes used the name Thackeray River, rather than Inangahua. William Makepeace Thackeray was a close friend of Charles Buller, after whom the Buller River was named.
