= William Gillespie (New Zealand politician) =

New Zealand politician (1893–1961)

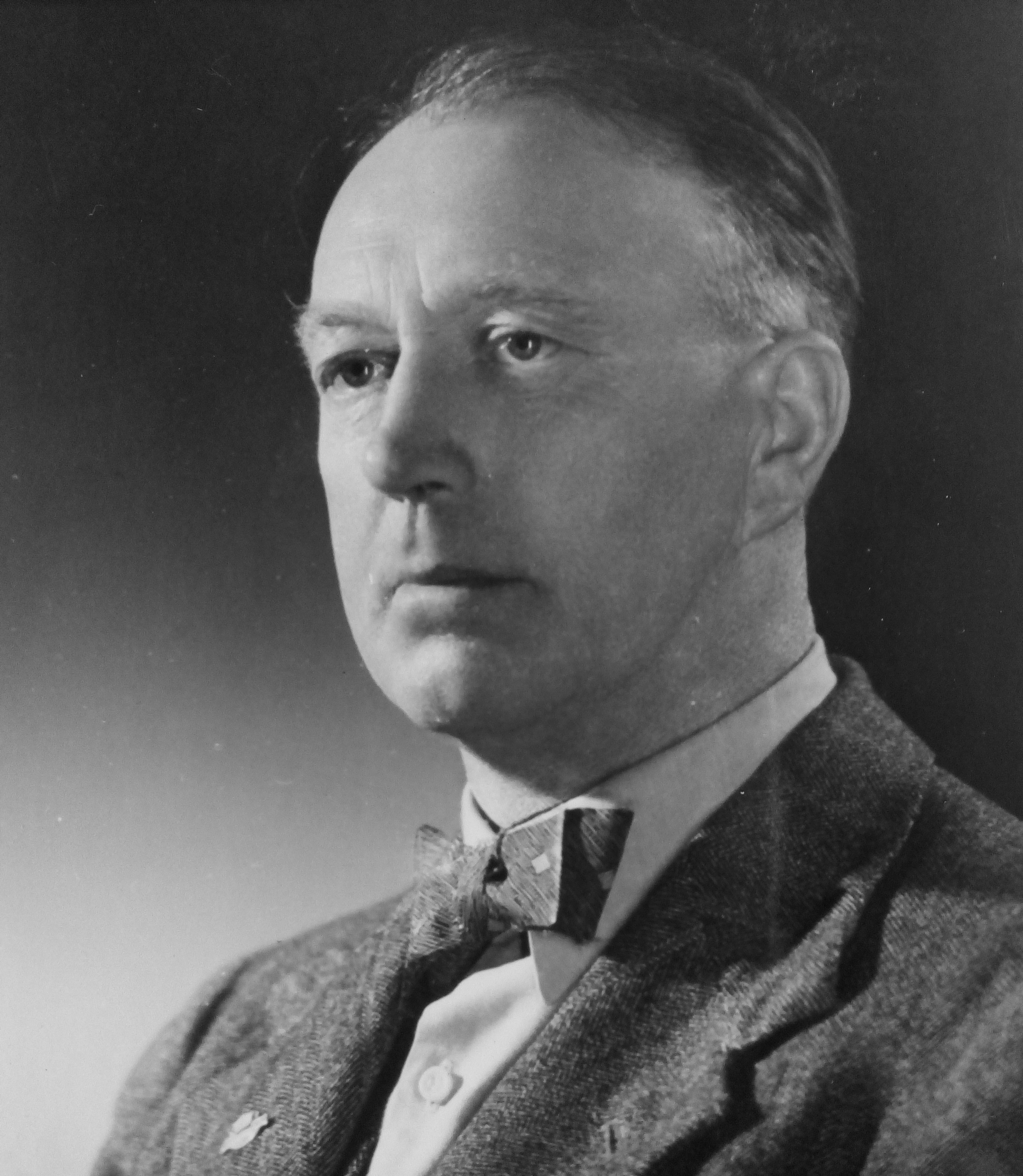
Gillespie c. 1950

William Henry Gillespie (14 August 1893 – 23 April 1961) was a New Zealand politician of the National Party. He was a cabinet minister from 1960 to 1961.

== Biography ==
New Zealand Parliament
Years	Term	Electorate	Party
1943–1946	27th	Hurunui	National
1946–1949	28th	Hurunui	National
1949–1951	29th	Hurunui	National
1951–1954	30th	Hurunui	National
1954–1957	31st	Hurunui	National
1957–1960	32nd	Hurunui	National
1960–1961	33rd	Hurunui	National

Gillespie was born in 1893. He received his education at Ashley Gorge and Oxford District High School, and left school aged 13 following his father's death.

He represented the Canterbury electorate of Hurunui from 1943 to 1961, when he died, causing the 1961 by-election for Hurunui.

From 1958 to 1960 he was Shadow Minister of Agriculture and Lands while National was in opposition. At the formation of the Second National Government he was appointed a member of Cabinet, having been designated as Minister of Agriculture on 12 December 1960. He was chairman of the board of Canterbury Agricultural College from 1951 until 1960.

In 1953, Gillespie was awarded the Queen Elizabeth II Coronation Medal.
