= Hurunui (electorate) =

Hurunui was a parliamentary electorate in the Canterbury region of New Zealand, from 1902 (when it replaced Ashley) to 1963.

== Population centres ==
The Representation Act 1900 had increased the membership of the House of Representatives from general electorates 70 to 76, and this was implemented through the 1902 electoral redistribution. In 1902, changes to the country quota affected the three-member electorates in the four main centres. The tolerance between electorates was increased to ±1,250 so that the Representation Commissions (since 1896, there had been separate commissions for the North and South Islands) could take greater account of communities of interest. These changes proved very disruptive to existing boundaries, and six electorates were established for the first time, including Hurunui, and two electorates that previously existed were re-established.

The Hurunui electorate was rural. In the 1902 election, there were 34 polling stations, ranging from Amberley (the principal station), Kaikōura, Ashley, Sefton, Waikari, and Mackenzie. In 1905, election meetings were held in Hawarden and Balcairn.

== History ==
The Hurunui electorate was first formed for the 1902 election, when it replaced the Ashley electorate. The first election in the new electorate was contested by five candidates: Richard Meredith of the Liberal Party, who was the incumbent from the Ashley electorate, Andrew Rutherford who also stood as a Liberal, George Forbes who stood as an Independent Liberal, as he did not gain the Liberal Party's nomination, Henry Reece, and George Thomas Pulley. Rutherford was successful, gaining almost twice the number of votes than the second-placed candidate, Reece.

Three candidates contested the 1905 election. Rutherford was returned with more than twice the votes of Obed Frederick Clothier, and George Thomas Pulley came a distant third.

Rutherford retired in 1908, and George Forbes and Obed Frederick Clothier contested the 1908 election. Forbes was successful, and started his long parliamentary career that would see him hold the electorate for the next 35 years to 1943. Forbes was Prime Minister from 1930 to 1935.

William Gillespie succeeded Forbes in 1943 and held the electorate until his death in 1961.

The last member was Lorrie Pickering of the National Party from the 1961 by-election to 1963. Pickering transferred to the new Rangiora electorate in 1963.

In 1954, Norman Kirk stood in Hurunui as the Labour candidate, his first venture into national (parliamentary) politics. He increased Labour's share of the vote considerably, but did not win.

=== Members of Parliament ===
The electorate was represented by four Members of Parliament.

Key

Liberal United National

Election	Winner
1902 election	Andrew Rutherford
1905 election	Andrew Rutherford
1908 election	George Forbes
1911 election	George Forbes
1914 election	George Forbes
1919 election	George Forbes
1922 election	George Forbes
1925 election	George Forbes
1928 election	George Forbes
1931 election	George Forbes
1935 election	George Forbes
1938 election	George Forbes
1943 election	William Gillespie
1946 election	William Gillespie
1949 election	William Gillespie
1951 election	William Gillespie
1954 election	William Gillespie
1957 election	William Gillespie
1960 election	William Gillespie
1961 by-election	Lorrie Pickering
(Electorate abolished in 1963; see Rangiora)

== Election results ==
=== 1961 by-election ===
1961 Hurunui by-election
Party	Candidate	Votes	%	±%
National	Lorrie Pickering	6,644	52.91	
Labour	Arthur Adcock	4,760	37.91	
Social Credit	Jack Clark	1,153	9.18	
Majority		1,884	15.00	
Turnout		12,557	74.13	
Registered electors		16,940		
National hold		Swing		

=== 1960 election ===
1960 general election: Hurunui
Party	Candidate	Votes	%	±%
National	William Gillespie	8,307	55.2	+2.6
Labour	Arthur Adcock	5,576	37.0	−3.3
Social Credit	Jack Clark	1,180	7.8	+0.5
Majority		2,731	18.2	
Turnout			90.2	
Registered electors		16,745		

=== 1957 election ===
1957 general election: Hurunui
Party	Candidate	Votes	%	±%
National	William Gillespie	7,614	53.4	+0.1
Labour	Lyn Christie	5,865	40.3	+7.4
Social Credit	Laurie Cate	1,057	7.3	−7.5
Majority		1,749	12.1	
Turnout			93.2	
Registered electors		15,657		

=== 1954 election ===
1954 general election: Hurunui
Party	Candidate	Votes	%	±%
National	William Gillespie	6,454	52.3	−8.7
Labour	Norman Kirk	4,059	32.9	
Social Credit	Laurie Cate	1,829	14.8	
Majority		2,395	19.4	−2.6
Turnout		13,524	91.8	+3.9

=== 1951 election ===
1951 general election: Hurunui
Party	Candidate	Votes	%	±%
National	William Gillespie	8,086	61.0	+1.5
Labour	Ed Cassidy	5,165	39.0	−1.5
Majority		2,921	22.0	
Turnout			87.9	
Registered electors		15,099		

=== 1949 election ===
1949 general election: Hurunui
Party	Candidate	Votes	%	±%
National	William Gillespie	7,952	59.5	+3.9
Labour	Arthur J. Smith	5,417	40.5	−3.9
Majority		2,535	19.0	
Turnout			93.3	
Registered electors		14,397		

=== 1946 election ===
1946 general election: Hurunui
Party	Candidate	Votes	%	±%
National	William Gillespie	7,121	55.6	
Labour	John Mathison	5,681	44.4	
Majority		1,440	11.2	
Turnout			93.9	
Registered electors		13,626		

=== 1943 election ===
There were four candidates in 1943, with the election won by William Gillespie over James William Morgan.

=== 1938 election ===
1938 general election: Hurunui
Party	Candidate	Votes	%	±%
National	George Forbes	5,679	52.23	+3.03
Labour	Harold Denton	5,144	47.31	
Informal votes		49	0.45	−0.22
Majority		535	4.92	−7.16
Turnout		10,872	94.71	+4.28
Registered electors		11,479		

=== 1935 election ===
1935 general election: Hurunui
Party	Candidate	Votes	%	±%
United	George Forbes	4,897	49.20	−24.47
Labour	Donald Cyrus Davies	3,694	37.11	
Independent	Oliver Duff	1,362	13.68	
Informal votes		67	0.67	−0.13
Majority		1,203	12.08	−35.27
Turnout		9,953	90.43	+10.60
Registered electors		11,006		

=== 1931 election ===
1931 general election: Hurunui
Party	Candidate	Votes	%	±%
United	George Forbes	6,151	73.67	+17.62
Labour	Robert Joseph Logan	2,198	26.33	
Informal votes		67	0.80	−0.33
Majority		3,953	47.35	+28.06
Turnout		8,416	79.83	−10.26
Registered electors		10,543		

=== 1928 election ===
1928 general election: Hurunui
Party	Candidate	Votes	%	±%
United	George Forbes	5,344	56.05	+0.91
Reform	Leslie Robert Cathcart Macfarlane	3,505	36.76	
Labour	Frederick Turley	576	6.04	
Informal votes		108	1.13	+0.21
Majority		1,839	19.29	+8.08
Turnout		9,533	90.09	−0.56
Registered electors		10,581		

=== 1925 election ===
1925 general election: Hurunui
Party	Candidate	Votes	%	±%
Liberal	George Forbes	3,989	55.14	−2.95
Reform	George Armstrong	3,178	43.93	
Informal votes		67	0.92	−0.45
Majority		811	11.21	−5.35
Turnout		7,234	90.65	+5.23
Registered electors		7,980		

=== 1922 election ===
1922 general election: Hurunui
Party	Candidate	Votes	%	±%
Liberal	George Forbes	3,963	58.09	+5.98
Reform	Samuel Andrew	2,765	40.53	
Informal votes		94	1.37	+0.51
Majority		1,198	17.56	+6.01
Turnout		6,822	85.42	+4.66
Registered electors		7,986		

=== 1919 election ===
1919 general election: Hurunui
Party	Candidate	Votes	%	±%
Liberal	George Forbes	3,008	52.11	−12.80
Reform	George Armstrong	2,341	40.55	
Independent	G G Gardner	373	6.46	
Informal votes		50	0.86	−0.16
Majority		667	11.55	−18.28
Turnout		5,772	80.76	−2.03
Registered electors		7,147		

=== 1914 election ===
1914 general election: Hurunui
Party	Candidate	Votes	%	±%
Liberal	George Forbes	3,233	64.91	+6.02
Reform	William Banks	1,747	35.08	
Informal votes		46	0.92	−0.10
Majority		1,486	29.83	+11.02
Turnout		4,980	82.79	+3.63
Registered electors		6,015		

=== 1911 election ===
1911 general election: Hurunui, First ballot
Party	Candidate	Votes	%	±%
Liberal	George Forbes	2,940	58.89	+1.01
Reform	David Macfarlane	2,001	40.08	
Informal votes		51	1.02	+0.52
Majority		939	18.81	+2.74
Turnout		4,992	79.16	+14.17
Registered electors		6,306		

=== 1908 election ===
1908 general election: Hurunui, Second ballot
Party	Candidate	Votes	%	±%
Liberal	George Forbes	2,150	57.88	+9.66
Conservative	Obed Cloither	1,553	41.81	+10.02
Informal votes		11	0.29	0.54
Majority		597	16.07	
Turnout		3,714	64.99	−9.61

1908 general election: Hurunui, First ballot
Party	Candidate	Votes	%	±%
Liberal	George Forbes	2,056	48.22	
Conservative	Obed Cloither	1,357	31.83	
Ind. Labour League	G D Greenwood	509	11.93	
Independent Liberal	George Pulley	309	7.24	
Informal votes		32	0.75	
Turnout		4,263	74.60	
Registered electors		5,714		

=== 1902 election ===
1902 general election: Hurunui
Party	Candidate	Votes	%	±%
Liberal	Andrew Rutherford	1,577	44.24	
Conservative	Henry Fear Reece	880	24.69	
Liberal	Richard Meredith	834	23.40	
Liberal	George Forbes	205	5.75	
Independent Liberal	George Pulley	68	1.90	
Majority		697	19.55	
Turnout		3,564	85.69	
Registered electors		4,519		

== Bibliography ==
- Hislop, J. (1923). The General Election, 1922. Government Printer.
- McRobie, Alan (1989). Electoral Atlas of New Zealand. Wellington: GP Books. ISBN 0-477-01384-8.
- Norton, Clifford (1988). New Zealand parliamentary election results, 1946–1987. Wellington: Victoria University of Wellington Department of Political Science. ISBN 0-475-11200-8.
- Wilson, Jim (1985) [First published in 1913]. New Zealand Parliamentary Record, 1840–1984 (4th ed.). Wellington: V.R. Ward, Govt. Printer. OCLC 154283103.
