= Kerrytown, New Zealand =

Kerrytown
- Rural Area
- Interactive map of Kerrytown
- Coordinates: 44.274°S 171.195°E
- Country: New Zealand
- Region: Canterbury
- Territorial authority: Timaru District
- Ward: Pleasant Point-Temuka Ward
- Community: Pleasant Point
- Electorates: Rangitata; Te Tai Tonga (Māori)

Government
  - Territorial authority: Timaru District Council
  - Regional council: Environment Canterbury
  - Mayor of Timaru: Nigel Bowen
  - Rangitata MP: James Meager
  - Te Tai Tonga MP: Tākuta Ferris

Area
  - Total: 30.95 km^{2} (11.95 sq mi)
- Elevation: 40 m (130 ft)

Population (2023 census)
  - Total: 378
  - Density: 12.2/km^{2} (31.6/sq mi)
- Time zone: UTC+12 (NZST)
  - Summer (DST): UTC+13 (NZDT)
- Postcode: 7975
- Area code: 03
- Local iwi: Ngāi Tahu

Kerrytown is a small rural community in the Timaru District, Canterbury, New Zealand. It is located east of Pleasant Point and north-west of Timaru.

== Demographics ==
Kerrytown locality covers 30.95 km^{2} (11.95 sq mi). It is part of Levels statistical area.

Historical population
Year	Pop.	±% p.a.
2006	342	—
2013	369	+1.09%
2018	384	+0.80%
2023	378	−0.31%

Kerrytown had a population of 378 in the 2023 New Zealand census, a decrease of 6 people (−1.6%) since the 2018 census, and an increase of 9 people (2.4%) since the 2013 census. There were 195 males, 180 females, and 3 people of other genders in 141 dwellings. 1.6% of people identified as LGBTIQ+. There were 69 people (18.3%) aged under 15 years, 54 (14.3%) aged 15 to 29, 192 (50.8%) aged 30 to 64, and 63 (16.7%) aged 65 or older.

People could identify as more than one ethnicity. The results were 92.1% European (Pākehā); 7.1% Māori; 3.2% Asian; 0.8% Middle Eastern, Latin American and African New Zealanders (MELAA); and 7.9% other, which includes people giving their ethnicity as "New Zealander". English was spoken by 98.4%, Māori by 0.8%, and other languages by 6.3%. New Zealand Sign Language was known by 0.8%. The percentage of people born overseas was 11.1, compared with 28.8% nationally.

Religious affiliations were 40.5% Christian, 0.8% Islam, and 0.8% other religions. People who answered that they had no religion were 47.6%, and 9.5% of people did not answer the census question.

Of those at least 15 years old, 54 (17.5%) people had a bachelor's or higher degree, 201 (65.0%) had a post-high school certificate or diploma, and 57 (18.4%) people exclusively held high school qualifications. 54 people (17.5%) earned over $100,000 compared to 12.1% nationally. The employment status of those at least 15 was 168 (54.4%) full-time, 57 (18.4%) part-time, and 3 (1.0%) unemployed.
