= George Fairweather Moonlight =

New Zealand gold miner and farmer (1832–1884)

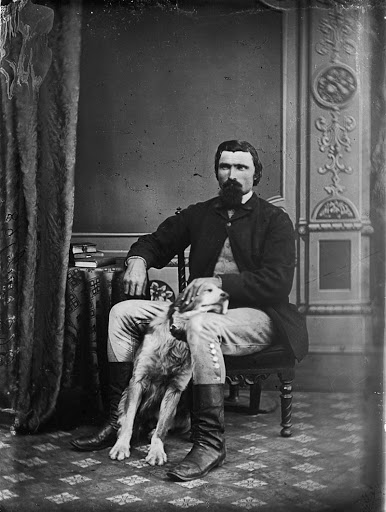
- George Fairweather Moonlight
- Born: 5 August 1832; Kincardineshire, Scotland
- Died: 17 July 1884 (aged 51); Upper Buller
- Occupations: Gold miner, farmer, hotel-keeper and storekeeper
- Notable work: Discovery of gold at Moonlight creeks in Otago and on the West Coast
- Spouse: Elizabeth Gaukrodger (m. 1865; died 1882)

George Fairweather Moonlight (5 August 1832 – 17 July 1884) was a New Zealand gold miner, farmer, storekeeper and hotel-keeper.

== Early life and California ==
George Fairweather Moonlight was born in 1832 in Glenbervie in Kincardineshire, Scotland. He was the son of James Moonlight, an agricultural labourer, and his wife Jane (née Lindsay). He never received a formal education; rather, from about the age of nine until he was old enough to go to sea he worked on local herring boats.

In 1848, at the age of 16, while engaged on a trading ship off the west coast of America, he jumped ship along with the rest of the crew and joined the Californian gold rush. His six years spent working in California and possibly Virginia were obviously formative ones. For the rest of his life he spoke with an American accent, used American phrases, and typically dressed in the style of a Californian digger: a Crimean shirt, knee breeches, Wellington boots and a bright-coloured sash. He was described as having a splendid physique, being almost six foot tall and weighing 185 pounds, all of which was bone and muscle.

== Victoria and Otago ==
In 1854 Moonlight arrived in Sydney, where he met Jack Tarran, who would become his lifelong friend. Together they went to Victorian goldfields, working at the Bunyong diggings near Ballarat, and in 1855 at Fiery Creek, staying there and in the neighbouring diggings for several years. Moonlight gained a reputation as a prospector among the Victorian miners. While scouting or testing new ground he had to keep very quiet about his movements, or men would follow him in the hope of joining a new rush. At some point he returned to shipwork, sailing to Java, but he soon returned to Australia, where he again teamed up with Jack Tarran. Also his cousin Tom Moonlight joined them. They settled down at the Victorian diggings until the Otago gold rush in New Zealand broke out in 1861.

Arriving in Otago they likely joined the rush to the Tuapeka, which attracted a large Australian population during the final months of 1861. By September 1862 they had joined the Dunstan rush on the Clutha River. Here Moonlight met his old friend William Dunnet Sutherland, whom he knew from California and Victoria. Sutherland had also spent nine years gold mining on the Fraser River in British Columbia. Given the resemblance of Central Otago to British Columbia, Sutherland was convinced they should venture further west and test some of the streams that ran into the inland lakes. Moonlight and his party joined him, but as they travelled over the ranges they met their friend the renowned prospector Bill Fox, who told them that he had discovered a goldfield on the Arrow River. The Moonlight-Sutherland party stopped there for a while, but convinced they could do better, they headed towards what they later learned was Lake Wakatipu, and discovered a river above it which was later called the Shotover. Other prospectors were in the area and there was a rush to the Shotover. Moonlight meanwhile went over a big hill and discovered gold on what was then called Moonlight Creek, a tributary of the Shotover, and Sutherland settled down on the main stream to mine a bar which would later be named Sutherland's Beach.

In January 1863 the Otago Daily Times reported, "The population during the past week have been steadily migrating Westward, on the track of a man who goes by the name of ‘Moonlight;’ and a great deal of auriferous country has been discovered, causing a rush from the older workings on the Arrow and Shotover Rivers, but principally from the former." In February the Lake Diggings reporter for the Southland Times wrote, "A friend of mine has penetrated with three others within six miles of the west coast. They met Moonlight and Whisky Tom engaged in prospecting about 20 miles from the coast, but they did not seem inclined to venture further, as they had been out for some length of time, and were getting short of provisions."

== Nelson and Marlborough ==
More interested in discovering new ground than settling down to work a claim, Moonlight left Otago to explore the auriferous ground in the hinterland of Nelson Province. He arrived there in May 1863 without his mates, but Jack Tarran would likely have joined him shortly afterwards. Tom Moonlight remained in Otago, but eventually settled in the Nelson area. After arriving in Nelson, George Moonlight followed the partially formed road to the Buller, and then set out into the wilderness where he discovered a new route from the headwaters of Mangles to the Maruia River (via the headwaters of the Matakitaki and its large tributary the Glenroy), which greatly reduced the distance when travelling from the Buller to the Grey Valley and West Coast. He named two tributaries of the Maruia the Rappahannock and Shenandoah, after rivers in Virginia. In July 1863 a party of four prospectors discovered payable gold on the Mangles, causing a rush to the area. Prospectors ventured out from the Mangles to Matakitaki, and in November two men sent out by the Nelson Provincial Government to investigate Moonlight's route, came across him and his party working ground in the upper Matakitaki.

In April 1864, gold was discovered in the Province of Marlborough on a tributary of the Pelorus River called the Wakamarina. When word of the rich bonanza claims reached Otago, thousands of men relocated north. Moonlight and his mates John Bailie and Jack Tarran on the Matakitaki did exactly the same. In May a reporter from the Wakamarina wrote, "Moonlight and party have started, with nine days’ provisions, to thoroughly prospect the Pelorus river, and I quite look forward to hearing of their successfully opening a large addition to this gold-field." They were joined at the Wakamarina by William Henry Phillips, who knew them from Victoria, and they did fairly well, but a few months later, hearing of gold being discovered on the West Coast, they went by steamer to the Grey.

== The West Coast and Marriage ==
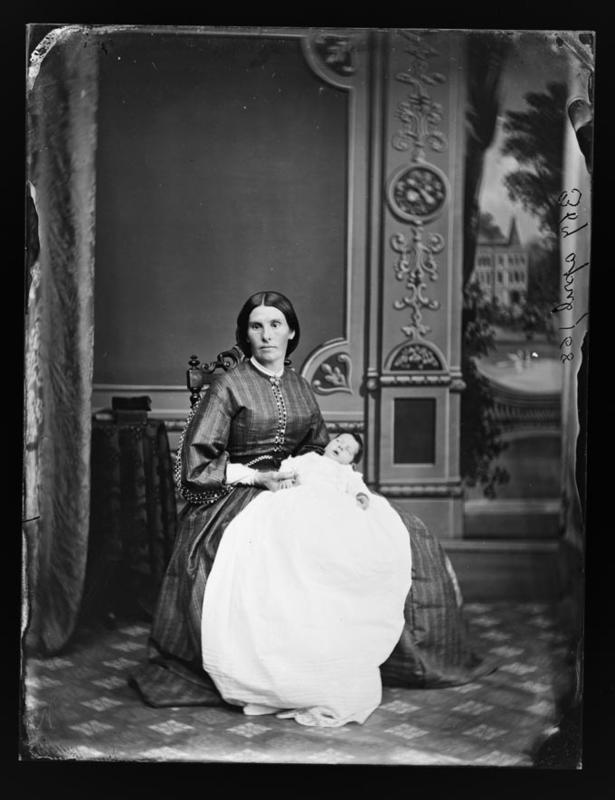
Elizabeth Moonlight

Moonlight and party tried their luck at Greenstone Creek and several other diggings, without much profit. About three miles north of the Hokitika River they followed a creek through the bush, and prospected for three months without success. It was very disappointing, especially because they had been on good gold at the Wakamarina. They planted their tools, Moonlight carved his name on a tree, and they headed out. As they emerged from the bush they saw that a large town had materialised on the Hokitika River. They were wet and short of clothes, but had plenty of money, about £800 between them, so they paid a passer-by to buy new clothes for them, and went back to Nelson.

Upon his return to Nelson, Moonlight married Elizabeth Gaukrodger on 28 February 1865 at St John's Church in the township of Wakefield in Waimea South. She was 26, a native of Halifax, Yorkshire, and he was 33. Her parents were Charles and Mary Gaukrodger, proprietors of an accommodation house near Wakefield at Foxhill. Presumably they had gotten to know each other when Moonlight came out for provisions during his previous year's prospecting in the Mātakitaki.

After marrying Elizabeth, George Moonlight set off again for the West Coast goldfields. He tramped overland with Jack Tarran, prospecting in the Grey Valley as they went. The first payable gold had been discovered in the Grey Valley at Blackball Creek in November 1864. A small rush had taken place in January 1865, and though miners did well, the better diggings at the Waimea and Kaniere rivers near Hokitika meant there was no major movement northwards. In March or April 1865, Moonlight apparently crossed over from the coastal side of the Paparoa Range, down a gully on the slopes of the Grey watershed, where he discovered a rich wash. News reached Hokitika in mid June and about 300 men set off for the new diggings at Moonlight Creek. Several weeks later a number of other discoveries were made on tributaries of the Grey, so that during July it was rushed by thousands of diggers.

Moonlight township was built at the base of the gully and the diggings became one of the most important of the Southwest Nelson Goldfield, but Moonlight himself soon moved on to other prospects. In September 1865, along with Tarran and five other men, he went up the Grey River in a boat laden with provisions. The rumour was that they had gone to test some ground they had discovered on their way overland from Nelson. Two and a half weeks later they returned to register a prospector's claim in a creek they named the Tarran, which ran into the Mawhera-iti (Little Grey) River about four miles above its junction with the Grey. Moonlight left his name off the prospector's claim because he didn't believe the diggings would hold a large population and he didn't want to attract too many people there.

== Richmond and the Upper Buller ==
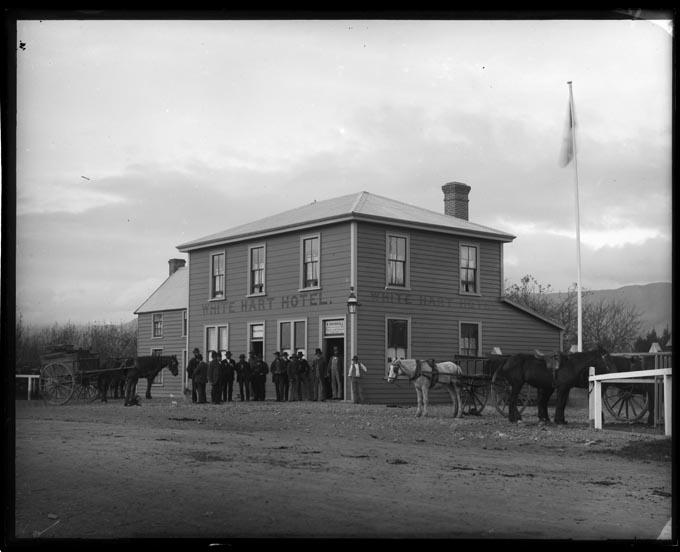
The White Hart Hotel in Richmond

By March 1866 Moonlight had returned north, and in April he began conducting a coaching business between Nelson and the White Hart Hotel in Richmond, for which he held the lease. In November 1866, at the White Hart, Elizabeth Moonlight gave birth to a daughter named Elizabeth (known as Tottie), and in March 1868 she gave birth to a son named John.

In July 1869 they sold by auction all of their household furniture at the White Hart, as well as a four stall stable and a coach house, together with several serviceable horses. Moonlight also advertised for sale the unexpired term of lease on the hotel. During the second half of 1869 he returned to the Upper Buller, where with the help of Tarran he built an accommodation house at the junction of the Warwick and Maruia rivers. Elizabeth arrived in 1870 with the children. They kept a store at the Upper Maruia, and also opened one at the junction of the Matakitaki and Glenroy. In 1875, their Upper Maruia establishment was described as being very complete, and including a large dairy station.

The Moonlight family lived at the junction of the Warwick from 1870 to 1876. Periodically, George spent 3–4 days bringing in supplies on packhorses from Nelson over the South Buller Road (as the route he had discovered was now called, connecting Nelson to the Grey Valley) while Elizabeth managed their store. In 1876, with the completion of the North Buller Road, they moved to Hampden, where they built a house, store and warehouse. The North Buller Road connected Nelson to the Lyell goldfield and Westport by following the Buller river itself, with a branch road up the Matakitaki to the Glenroy. Hampden, at the mouth of the Matakitaki, was a stopping place along the way, and so the Moonlights hoped to tap into this new lucrative trade as well as have a better way to supply their stores at the Glenroy and the Upper Maruia. They also advertised as wine and spirits merchants.

In early 1878 the Moonlights bought the Commercial Hotel in Hampden for £900. Most of the buildings of Hampden were situated on the low-lying land at the junction of the Buller and Matakitaki. In May 1878 heavy rains brought a terrible flood, where the streams of the Matakitaki and Buller cut into the land on which the township was built. The flood carried away the Moonlights’ stabling, almost completely demolished their house, and the Commercial Hotel was damaged beyond repair. George rebuilt it away from the river, up in the bush on what would become the future site of Murchison (renamed from Hampden in 1883), but the rebuild cost him dearly. The fenced complex included a larger Commercial Hotel as well as a smithy, butchery and store. There was much felling and stumping of trees to be done. He also had to replenish his stocks, his carting equipment, and rebuild his stables.

== Bankruptcy and Death ==
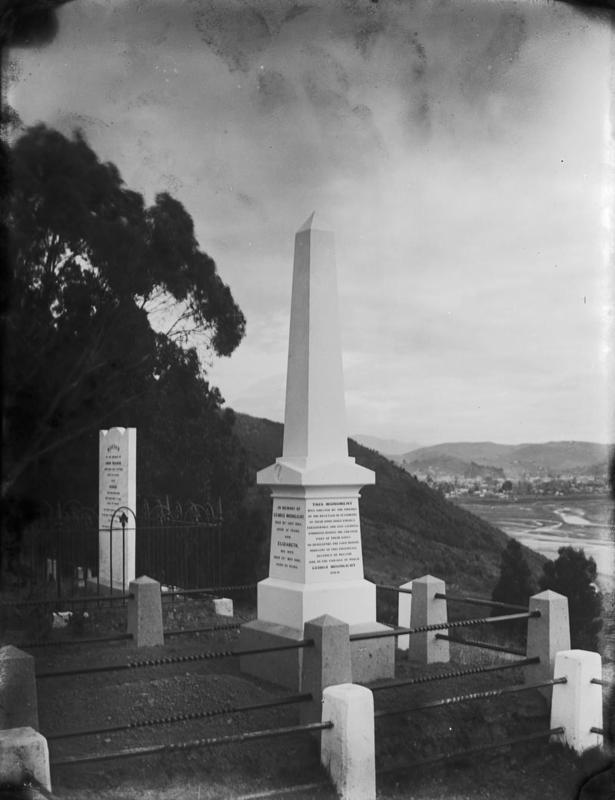
The above monument was placed at the graves of George and Elizabeth Moonlight in 1885. It reads: "This monument was erected by the friends of the deceased in testimony of their unwearying energy, perseverance, and self-sacrifice exhibited during the greater part of their lives in developing the gold-mining industry in this Provincial District of Nelson, and in the pursuit of which George Moonlight died."

At the end of April 1882 Elizabeth Moonlight caught typhoid. She went to Nelson for medical help, but died two weeks later. She was 44 years old. In May 1883, George Moonlight went into liquidation. Though his businesses appeared to be doing well he had accumulated too many bad debts, staking miners who either could not pay or who had left the district. Also his finances had never recovered from the flood damages of 1878, and he had generally over invested in buildings and leases on land. A great auction was held at Hampden, after which all that remained of his estate was the store and buildings at the Glenroy. With his creditors satisfied, he was discharged from bankruptcy at the Westport District Court in September.

In July 1884, Moonlight went prospecting with his old friend John Bailie in the ranges between the Buller and the Upper Motupiko Valley. Although they camped together, they would set out each day to prospect alone. One evening, after talking about going home, Moonlight failed to return to camp. Thinking that he might have simply left, it took two weeks for Bailie to raise the alarm. The body was discovered after a nine-day search by a party which included Jack Tarran and George's son John Moonlight. The coroner at the inquest was William Henry Phillips, who like John Bailie now resided nearby in the Upper Motueka district. Whereas John Bailie was a gold miner, Henry Phillips was a farmer who had been involved in local politics as a member of the Upper Motueka Road Board, then a member of the Waimea County Council. The evidence of the inquest showed that Moonlight had been discovered curled up, about five feet away from a makeshift walking stick, and had died from exposure. The verdict of the jury was "Found Dead". He was 55 years old.

Jack Tarran died five years later at the age of 60. He was lying in bed in his hut on the Maruia when a tree crashed through the roof and pinned both his legs. He lay there for five days without food or drink before he was discovered. Local miners carried him by stretcher 40 miles over the saddle to the dray road at Murchison. A telegram had been sent, so a horse and buggy were ready to receive him and take him 80 miles to Nelson. He died of his wounds two days later following the amputation of his legs. He left behind an estate which was valued at less than £20.
