= Henry Lewis (surveyor) =

New Zealand surveyor

- Born: 1813; Ongar, Essex
- Died: 7 August 1889 (aged 75); Nelson
- Occupations: Farmer and surveyor
- Known for: Discovery of Lewis Pass
- Spouse: Susan Lewis

Henry Lewis (1813 – 7 August 1889) was a New Zealand surveyor.

== Early life ==
Henry Lewis was the second son of Jonathan and Amelia Lewis. He was christened at Bobbingworth, Essex, on 19 December 1813. His father was an auctioneer and surveyor, of Water End Farm near Ongar in Essex.

In the 1851 census, Lewis was given as living at Water End Farm with his wife Susana (Susan) and their four children, the oldest of which was five. Susan was originally from Lynn in Norfolk. Lewis's father and older brother Jonathan were also recorded as residents of the house.

== Surveyor in New Zealand ==
In August 1855, Lewis and his family, which now included a fifth child, arrived in Nelson from Melbourne as steerage passengers on the Marchioness. They had emigrated to Australia as a first choice, and had probably lived there for a year or more. They had another child that November, and their youngest child was born two years later.

After settling in Brook Street in Nelson, Lewis advertised his services as a land surveyor. Over the next year, he obtained contracts from the Nelson Provincial Government along with private work, such as surveying Native Reserves in the Pelorus and Queen Charlotte sounds. By November 1856, he had entered into a partnership with surveyor and civil engineer John William Gay Beauchamp. Lewis was based on Brook Street in Nelson and Beauchamp was based at Motupipi in Golden Bay. They dissolved the partnership a year later in November 1857, and Lewis continued his practice until he took up a position with the Nelson Provincial survey department. By May 1860, he was one of two assistant surveyors working under the chief surveyor Thomas Brunner.

== Discovery of Lewis Pass ==
In 1859 and 1860, the Nelson Provincial Government made a concerted effort to open up its territory on the West Coast. The main focus for discovering an overland route through the mountainous region that separated Nelson and the West Coast was via the Buller and its tributary the Maruia to the Grey. While at the Grey, a run-holder named James Mackay had been instructed by Chief Tarapuhi Te Kaukihi that the Maruia Plain was a central point which communicated with the north, east and west coasts. Upon reaching the Maruia Plain from Nelson, a traveller could either continue following the Maruia through Cannibal Gorge which gave access to the Hanmer Plain on the East Coast, or follow the Ruhu Creek over easy pass to the Upper Grey on the West Coast.

While Mackay was exploring the route through the Buller Valley, a local judge named William Thomas Locke Travers tested a theory of his own. He followed the Wairau River to its source and then skirted around the Spenser Mountains by crossing several low passes. Travers believed that the Grey, like the Wairau, took its source from the Spenser Mountains, and when he found easy access to a stream which he believed to be the headwaters of the Grey, he returned and reported his findings to the Nelson Government.

The Provincial Government immediately despatched Lewis, accompanied by a cadet named Christopher Maling, to investigate whether Travers's route really would offer an easy alternative route to the Grey Valley. They set out on 21 March 1860, followed Travers's directions to the river they supposed to be the Grey, but on travelling down the gorge they found that the river was in fact the Maruia. Retracing their steps back up what they now realised was Cannibal's Gorge, they discovered a pass from the Upper Maruia to a new river, which was later named the Lewis.

Because the Maruia Plain was easier to access from Nelson by the Buller than by the Wairau, Travers's route was of no real use at the time. But because the Lewis River gave access to the Hope River, which in turn gave access to the Hanmer Plain, the route was chosen in the 1930s to form a main road from North Canterbury to the West Coast. Lewis Pass is now the northernmost of three main roads between the east and west coasts, the others being Arthurs Pass (named after Arthur Dudley Dobson) and Haast Pass (named after Julius von Haast). Lewis Pass is the main road between Canterbury and the Buller, Nelson and Tasman districts, and it is used as an alternative route between Canterbury and the central West Coast districts when the Arthurs Pass road is closed.

== Later life and death ==
In 1866, Henry and Susan's second eldest daughter, Eleanor, married Arthur Dudley Dobson of Canterbury. He was the eldest living son of Canterbury's Provincial Engineer Edward Dobson and since coming to Nelson in 1864 had been working as assistant Provincial Engineer under John Blackett. By 1869, Lewis was Chief Surveyor of Nelson, and when he resigned in December 1871, Dobson was appointed in his place.

After leaving the survey department, Lewis took up residence on property he had bought in Tākaka in Golden Bay. He farmed the land with his sons for many years until he retired and moved back to Nelson. He died at the age of 76 in 1889. Susan died fourteen years later in 1903 at the age of 89.
