= Rappahannock River (New Zealand) =

Coordinates: 42°05′S 172°14′E

Location
- Country: New Zealand

Physical characteristics
- Mouth
  - location: Warwick River
- Length: 15 km (9.3 mi)

The Rappahannock River is a river of the Tasman Region of New Zealand's South Island. It flows predominantly north from its sources east of Maruia, reaching the Warwick River five kilometres from the latter's outflow into the Maruia River.

== See also ==
- List of rivers of New Zealand
