= Blue Grey River =

Coordinates: 42.407908°S 172.107138°E

Location
- Country: New Zealand

Physical characteristics
- Source
  - location: Lake Christabel
- Mouth
  - location: Grey River
- Length: 8 km (5.0 mi)

The Blue Grey River is a river in New Zealand. It is an upper tributary of the Grey River, flowing from Lake Christabel, close to the township of Maruia Springs, and flowing west for 8 kilometres (5 mi) before reaching the upper Grey River.

== See also ==
- List of rivers of New Zealand
