= Rahu River =

Coordinates: 42°18′S 172°11′E

Location
- Country: New Zealand

Physical characteristics
- Mouth
  - location: Maruia River
- Length: 18 km (11 mi)

The Rahu River is a river in the Buller District of New Zealand's South Island. It rises in two branches (the Left Branch and Right Branch) within Victoria Forest Park. From the junction of these two branches, the Rahu flows initially southeast before turning north to flow into the Maruia River 5 kilometres (3.1 mi) north of Springs Junction. State Highway 7 follows the upper course of the Rahu to the northwest of Springs Junction, crossing the Rahu Saddle into the valley of the Inangahua River.

== See also ==
- List of rivers of New Zealand
