= Mount Haast =

Mount Haast may refer to the following peaks in New Zealand:

- Mount Haast (Buller District) (1,587 metres or 5,207 feet), hill located near Springs Junction
- Mount Haast (Westland District) (3,114 metres or 10,217 feet), mountain located just off the Main Divide
