= Warwick River =

Warwick River is the name of several rivers:

In New Zealand

- Warwick River (New Zealand)

In the United States

- Warwick River (Maryland)
- Warwick River (Virginia)
- Warwick River Shire, a former division of Virginia
