= Mount Haast (Buller District) =

Hill in Buller District, New Zealand

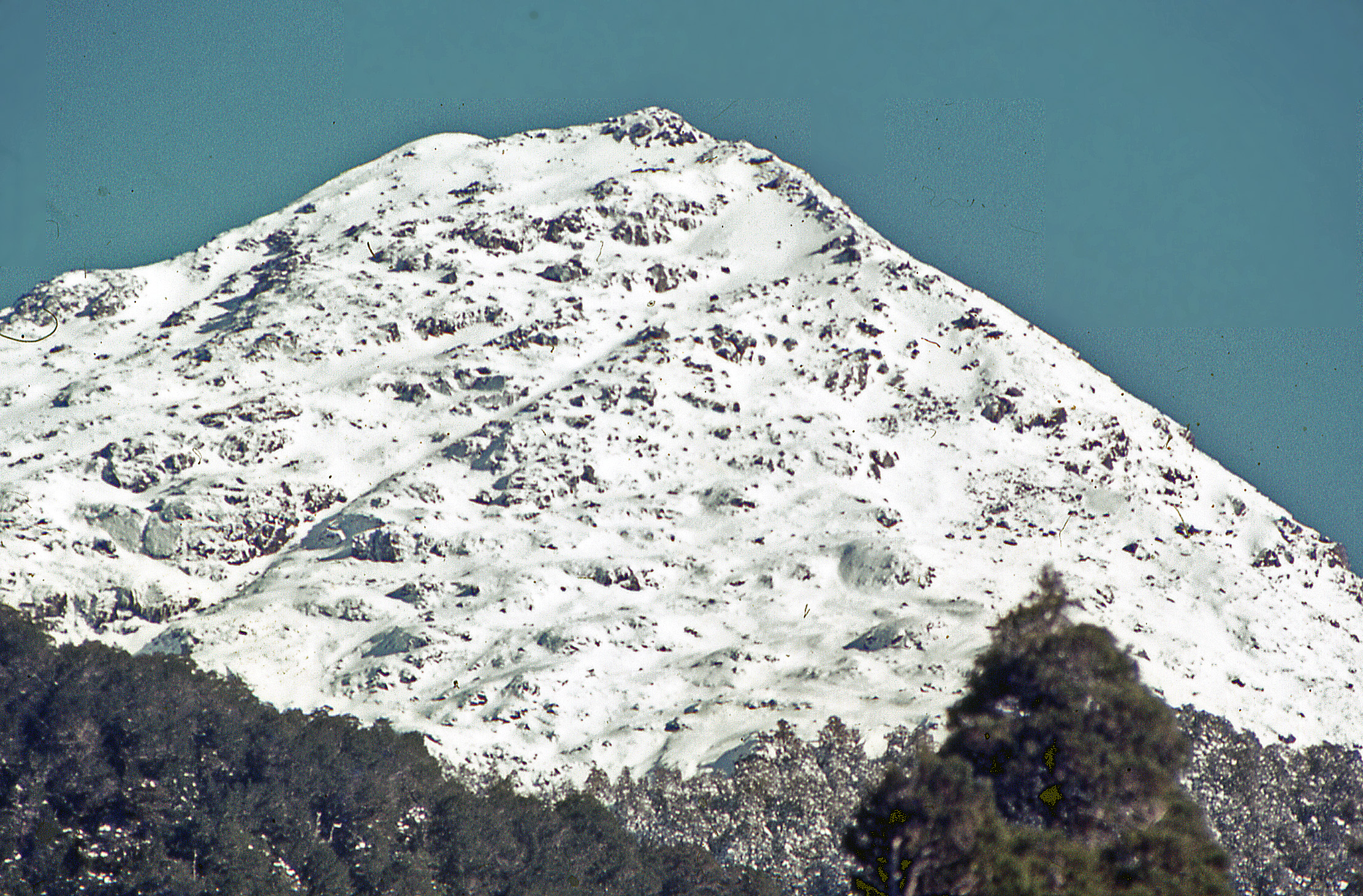
- Mount Haast

Highest point
- Elevation: 1,587 m (5,207 ft)
- Coordinates: 42°31′3″S 172°08′1″E

Naming
- Etymology: Julius von Haast

Geography
- Location within New Zealand
- Location: Buller District, New Zealand

Mount Haast (1,587 metres or 5,207 feet) is a hill located near Springs Junction, in the Buller District of New Zealand. The hill is prominent when approaching Springs Junction from the south-east on State Highway 7, where the pyramidal shape gives the (wrong) impression of a volcanic cone. The hill was named after the German-born geologist Julius von Haast by James Mackay (1831–1912).

== Description ==
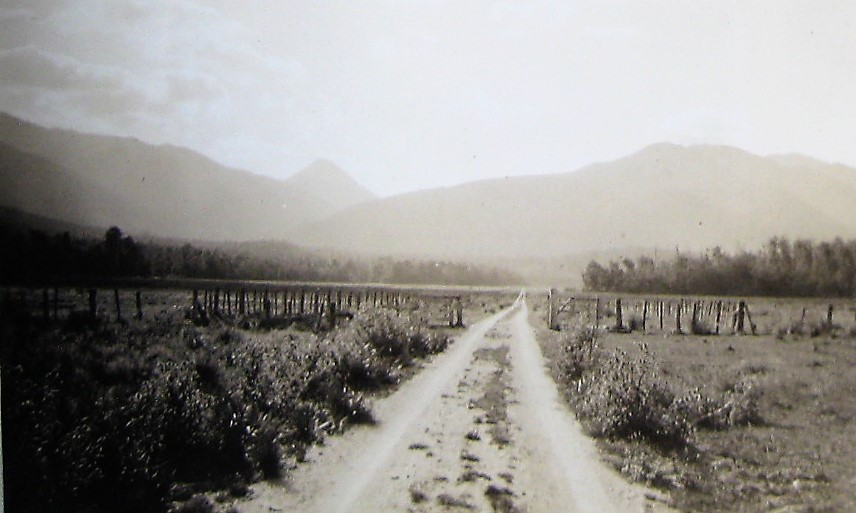
Mount Haast (left of centre) in the 1930s

Mount Haast is located near Rahu Saddle on State Highway 7, between Springs Junction and Reefton. It is accessible via a walking track that starts just off State Highway 7. It is a moderate six-hour return trip from the car park (challenging during winter).

Mount Haast was named by James Mackay. Mackay named two peaks after Haast; the other Mount Haast is a mountain (3,114 metres or 10,217 feet) just off the Main Divide in Westland District.
