= Lewis River (Canterbury) =

River in Canterbury, New Zealand

Coordinates: 42°29′S 172°23′E

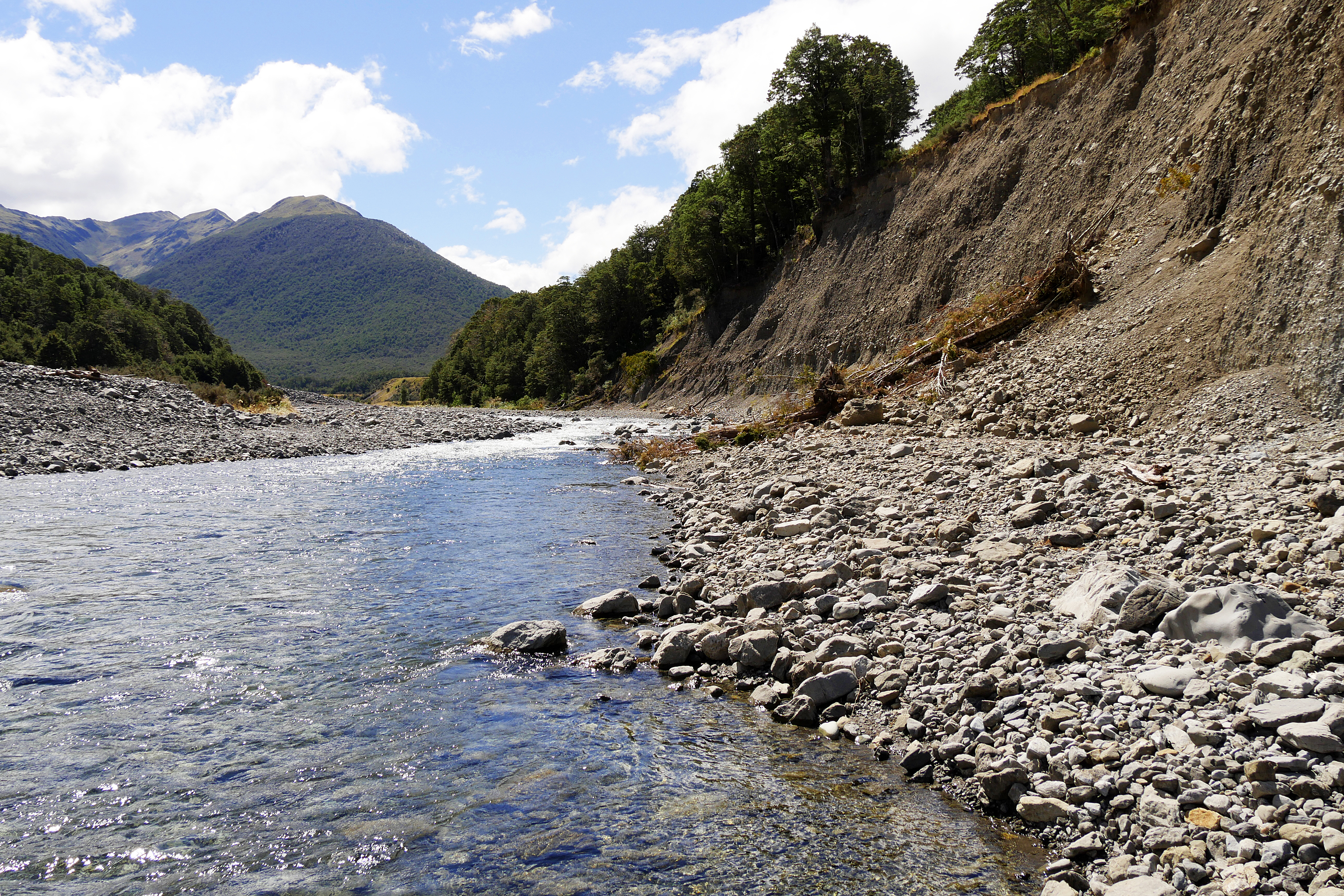
Lewis River near Sylvia Flats hot pools (view north/upstream; the third peak visible in the range is called Norma)

The Lewis River is a river in the Canterbury region of New Zealand. The valley of this river forms the southeastern approach to Lewis Pass; the river is thus adjacent to State Highway 7. The Lewis River is a tributary of the Boyle River. The Nina River flows into the Lewis River a few kilometres upstream from the confluence with the Boyle River. Land Information New Zealand lists the name of the river as "not official", i.e. the name is not confirmed by the New Zealand Geographic Board. It was named for the surveyor Henry Lewis, who discovered (Note: Note that the route had long been known to Māori people, who used it to get access to greenstone.) the pass in 1860 alongside his colleague Christopher Maling. Later in 1860, the river was named by Julius von Haast during his own expedition; von Haast became the brother-in-law of Lewis' daughter in 1866.

== See also ==
- List of rivers of New Zealand
