= Warwick River (New Zealand) =

Coordinates: 42.056849°S 172.249761°E

Location
- Country: New Zealand

Physical characteristics
- Mouth
  - location: Maruia River
- Length: 13 kilometres (8.1 mi)

The Warwick River is a river of the Tasman Region of New Zealand's South Island. It flows southwest to reach the Maruia River 10 kilometres north of Maruia. State Highway 65 follows the course of the Warwick River for some of its length.

== See also ==
- List of rivers of New Zealand
