= Maruia Springs =

Locality in the South Island of New Zealand

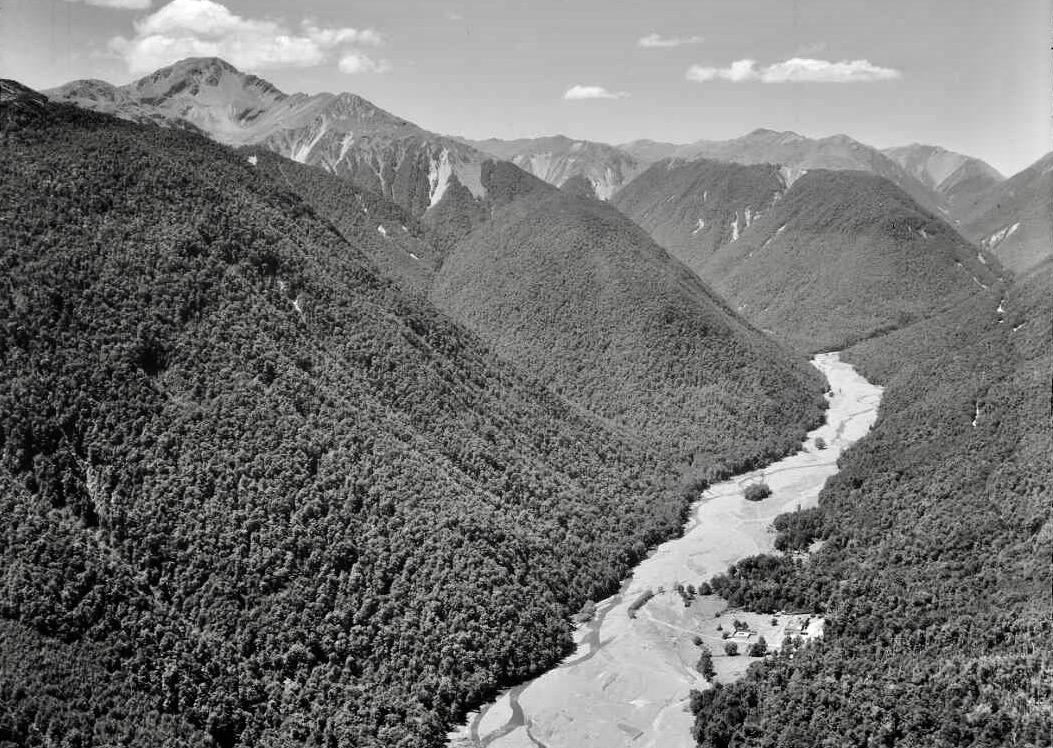
- Interactive map of Maruia Springs
- Coordinates: 42°22′45″S 172°20′00″E
- Country: New Zealand
- Region: West Coast
- Elevation: 586 m (1,923 ft)

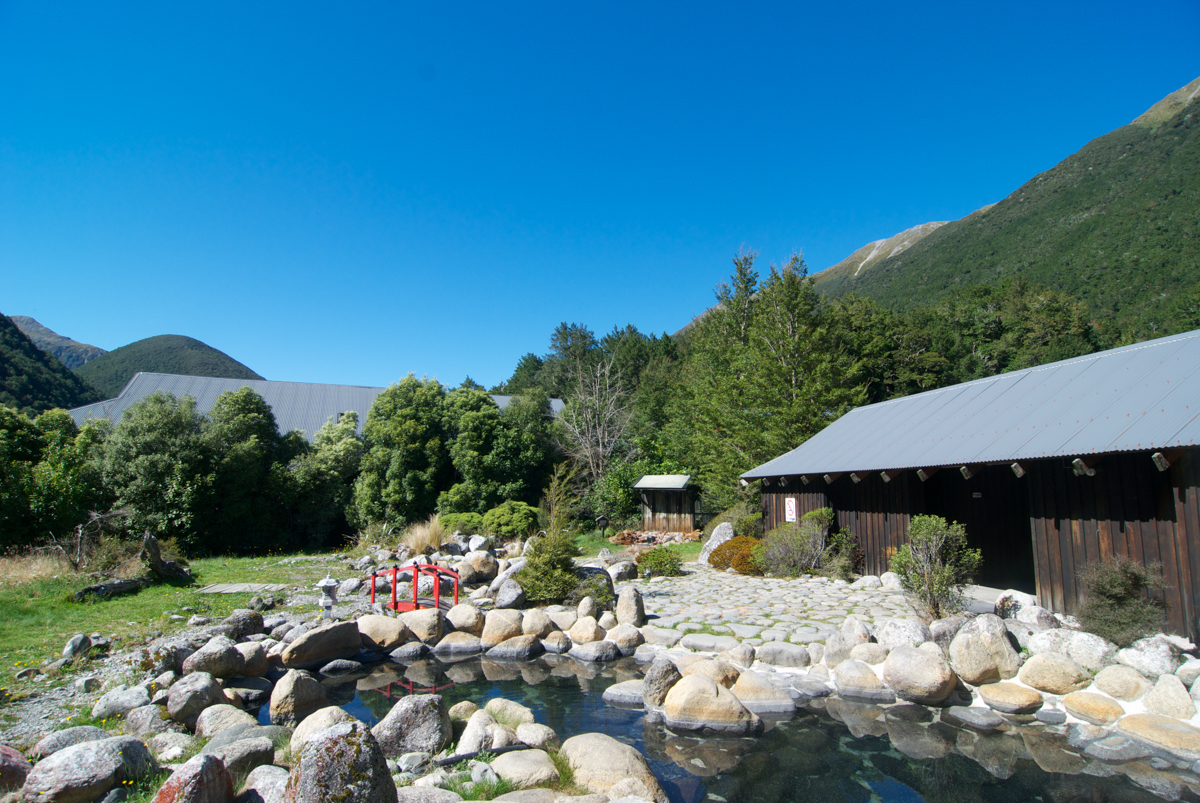
Rock Pools, Maruia Springs

Maruia Springs is a settlement in the West Coast Region of New Zealand's South Island. It is located on the south bank of the Maruia River on State Highway 7 to the west of the Lewis Pass.

The settlement is named for the nearby hot springs. While not as commercially exploited as other southern hot water springs (such as those at Hanmer Springs) it is still a popular spot with visitors. Water at 55 °C (131 °F), or more, is pumped from springs and from a well to a hotel, Japanese bath house, six private spas and two rock pools. The hot spring is probably fed through the nearby Awatere Fault.

The hot pools at Maruia have been known to Māori people for hundreds of years and used by jade traders as a place to rest and rejuvenate on their gruelling walk over to the West Coast. In the late 1800s, European settlers built rustic huts, and over the next century, this eventually turned into a hotel.
