= Julius von Haast =

German-born New Zealand geologist (1822–1887)

Sir Julius von Haast KCMG FRS
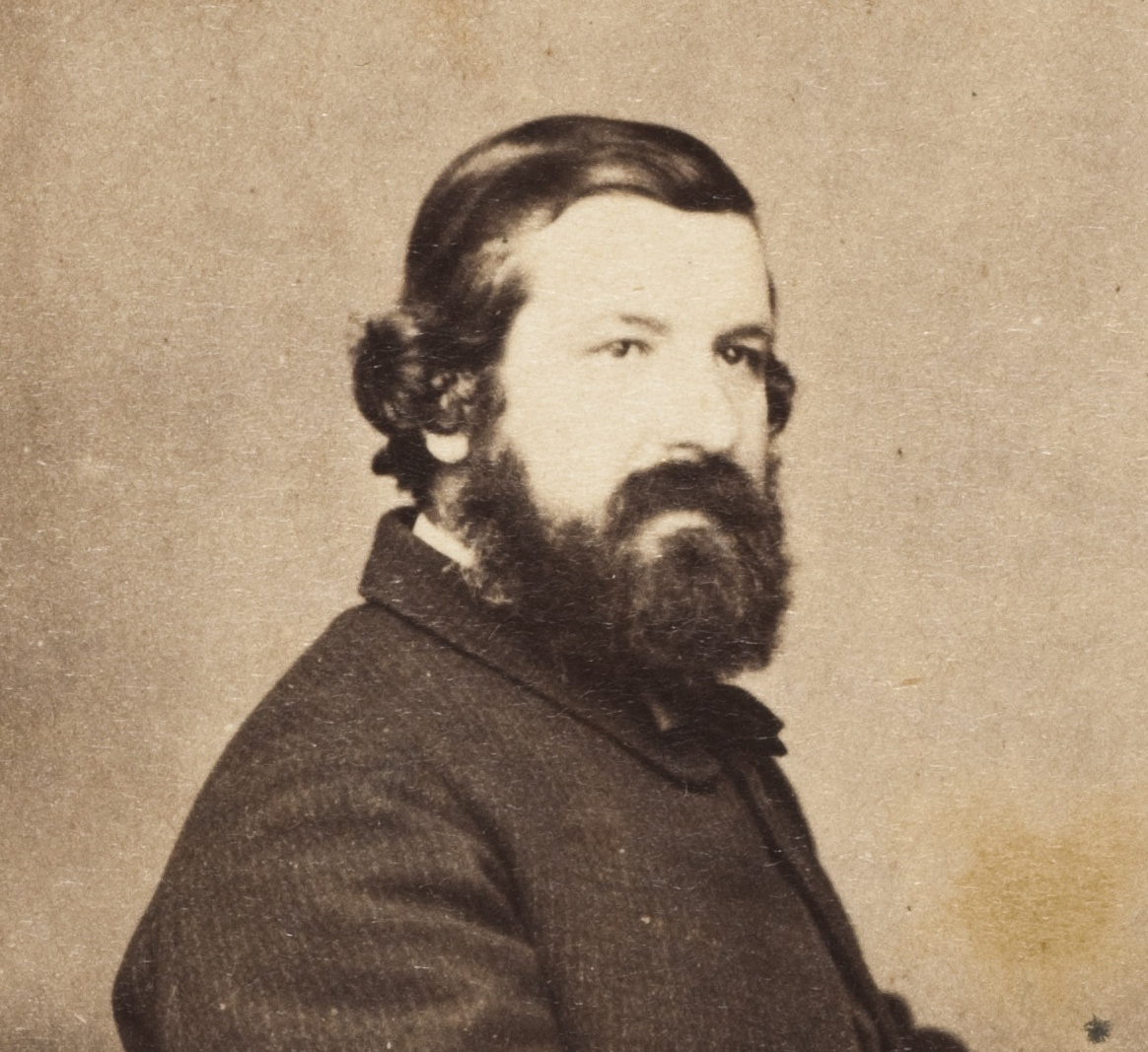
- Haast in c. 1867

Director of Canterbury Museum
- In office 3 December 1867 – 16 August 1887
- Preceded by: Office established
- Succeeded by: Henry Ogg Forbes

Personal details
- Born: Johann Franz Julius Haast; 1 May 1822 Bonn, Kingdom of Prussia
- Died: 16 August 1887 (aged 65) Christchurch, New Zealand
- Resting place: Holy Trinity Avonside
- Education: University of Bonn
- Occupation: Explorer, geologist
- Employer: Canterbury College, Christchurch
- Awards: Royal Geographical Society's Patron's Medal (1884); Knight Commander of the Order of St Michael and George (1886)

Sir Johann Franz Julius von Haast KCMG FRS (1 May 1822 – 16 August 1887) was a German-born New Zealand explorer, geologist, and founder of the Canterbury Museum in Christchurch.

== Early life ==
Johann Franz Julius Haast was born on 1 May 1822 in Bonn, a town in the Kingdom of Prussia, to a merchant and his wife. As a child, he attended a local school but was also educated at a grammar school in Cologne. After completing his formal schooling, he then entered the University of Bonn, where he studied geology and mineralogy. However, he did not graduate. As a young man, he travelled throughout Europe before basing himself in Frankfurt, working in the trading of books and mineral samples collected on his journeys. On 26 October 1846, Haast married Antonia Schmitt at Frankfurt, Germany. The marriage, although unhappy, produced a son named Robert two years later.

Haast was fluent in English and, in 1858, was contracted by a British shipping firm, A. Willis, Gann & Company, to report on the suitability of New Zealand for German emigrants. He travelled to London and in September of that year embarked aboard the Evening Star, destined for New Zealand. He arrived in Auckland on 21 December 1858 and, the following day, met the Austrian Ferdinand von Hochstetter at the home of a German emigrant. Hochstetter, on a scientific cruise aboard the ship Novara, had been invited by the Governor of New Zealand, Thomas Gore Browne, to provide advice on a recent find of a coal field south of Auckland, in Drury. Haast discovered the two men had a shared interest in geology and they quickly became friends.

== Exploring New Zealand ==
Haast accompanied Hochstetter on his journey to Drury a few days later so that he could assess the natural resources and attractions of Auckland as a place for German immigration. Also present on the trip were several of Hochstetter's fellow scientists as well as the explorer and surveyor Charles Heaphy. The party pushed further south, interacting with local Māori and journeying along part of the Waikato River before returning to Auckland in early January 1859.

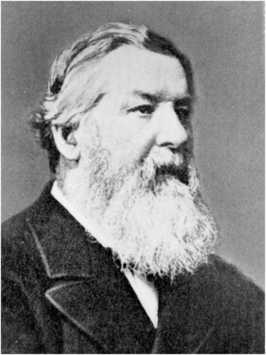
Julius von Haast

Hochstetter's report on the Drury coalfield was well received and he was formally asked to conduct geological surveys of Auckland and later Nelson Province. His work with the Novara expedition largely complete, he agreed to stay on in New Zealand for six months, although the Austrian government would pay his salary. Hochstetter, sometimes assisted by Haast, spent the first two months on geological expeditions in the immediate area around Auckland, for the most part examining extinct volcanic cones and a multitude of historic points of eruption. Hochstetter then turned his attention south, towards the Waikato area, and requested Haast join him. The Waikato, apart from a few roads and trails, was largely unknown—the expedition, which left Auckland on 7 March 1859, had to make its own maps on the journey south. In three months they travelled as far as Lake Taupō and also went as far west as Kāwhia Harbour and as far east as Maketu in the Bay of Plenty. Arriving back in Auckland on 24 May 1859, the party, which included a photographer, had covered 1000 kilometres. Numerous collected samples, sketches and photographs taken on the journey added to the scientific knowledge of the area. It was revealed to the citizens of Auckland during a well attended public lecture delivered by Hochstetter on 24 June.

At the end of their journey south Hochstetter had told a reporter from the New Zealander that Haast had collected a great variety of statistical information to send home to Germany. It is likely however that Haast's main focus was on geography and geology. As Hochstetter adapted his technique in the study of a new country under adverse conditions, he later referred to Haast as his enthusiastic assistant, who not only helped but pushed him forward. At the same time Haast learnt a great deal from Hochstetter's great expertise.

During June Hochstetter and Haast departed for the Coromandel to investigate the goldfields there. Then, in late July 1859, they travelled south by steamer to the province of Nelson, stopping briefly at New Plymouth and Wellington on the way. After his lecture in Auckland, Hochstetter had received invitations from several other provinces to explore the geological makeup of their regions, but he had already accepted an invitation from the Nelson Provincial Council to inspect the mineral deposits of Nelson Province, which were believed to include gold, coal and copper. Again Haast assisted Hochstetter, and after they discovered moa bones in the Aorere Valley in Golden Bay, Hochstetter left Haast in charge of the dig while he continued with other fieldwork. Over several days, assisted by Christopher Maling of the provincial survey department, Haast extracted several near-complete skeletons of the long-extinct bird. Hochstetter then tasked him with carrying out independent fieldwork in Golden Bay and with investigating the mineral deposits to the east of Nelson. At Shakespeare Bay, near present-day Picton, he correctly predicted the presence of gold based on his inspection of the rocks in the area.

Haast returned to Nelson on 24 September 1859 and met up with Hochstetter, whose time in New Zealand was ending. Hochstetter delivered a public lecture, which included both his and Haast's geological findings, and his conclusion that the minerals in the area would contribute significantly to the wealth of the region was well received by the interested citizens of Nelson. One final common expedition at the end of September investigated a newly discovered coalfield in Golden Bay; Hochstetter then sailed for Sydney on 2 October.

Following Hochstetter's departure from New Zealand, the Nelson Provincial Council asked Haast to build on the geological work already completed. In particular, he was to focus on identifying valuable minerals in the ranges between Nelson and the Grey River, to scout out travelling routes to Westland, and to complete a topographical map of the area.

Before beginning the survey Haast visited Canterbury Province, possibly to complete his German immigration report for A. Willis, Gann & Company. Hochstetter had written ahead to the Canterbury Provincial Government apologising for not visiting personally, but informing them that Haast would soon go there and during his stay would gather geological information on his behalf. While there Haast proposed that following on from his work in Nelson he could undertake a similar survey of Canterbury's portion of the West Coast.

Haast's topographical and geological survey of south west Nelson took eight months, from January to August 1860. His report to the Nelson Provincial Council was published in early 1861 and of note were his discoveries of coal near the present-day town of Westport. He also found that the coal seams discovered by Thomas Brunner in 1848 were of a higher quality than first thought. He found gold in several tributaries of the Upper Buller, and reported on his botanical and zoological findings.

== Life in Canterbury ==
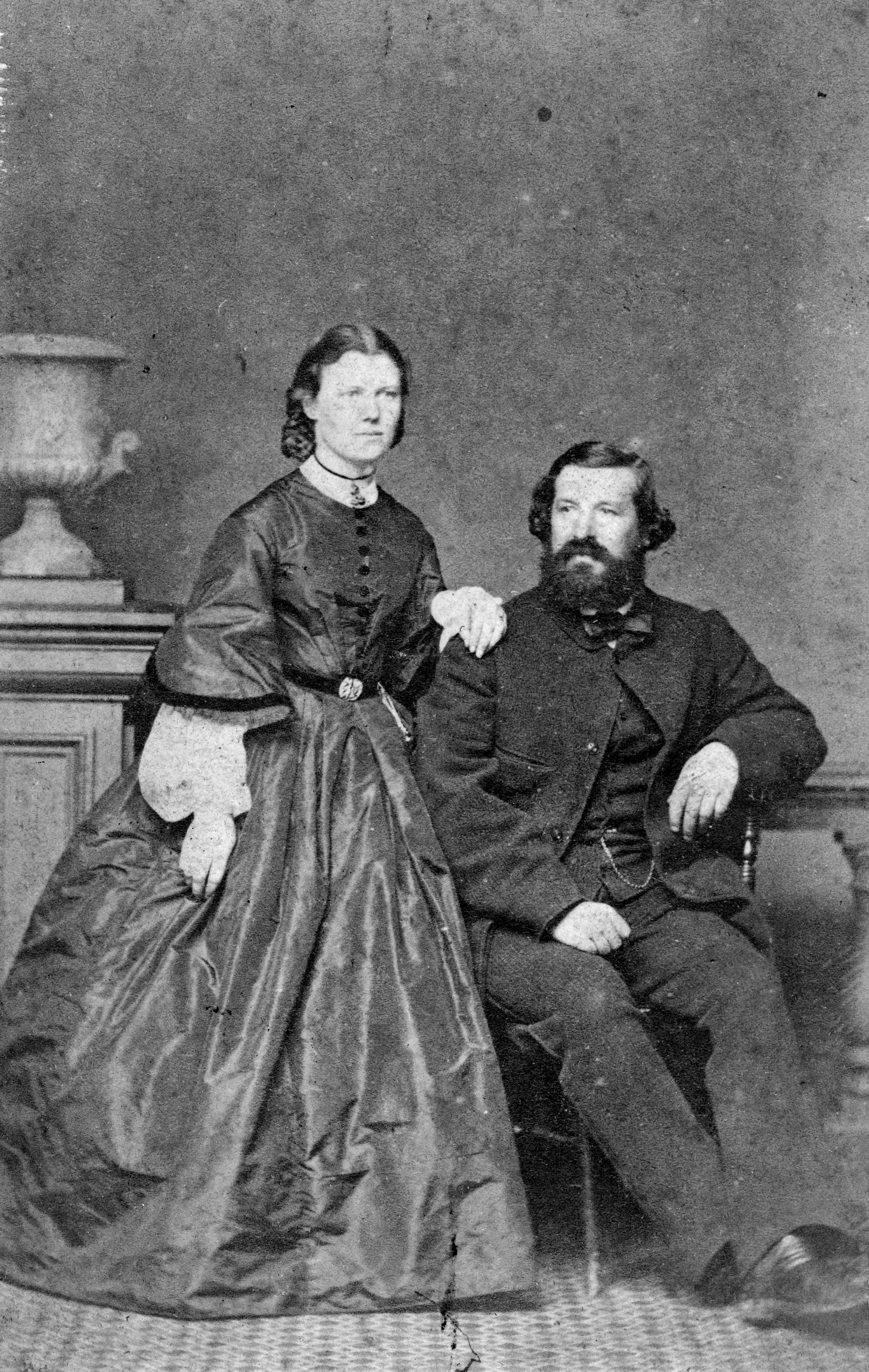
Haast with his wife Mary, 1865

When Haast arrived in Canterbury to begin his survey of their portion of the West Coast, the Superintendent of Canterbury William Moorhouse instead requested that he investigate the mountain range between Lyttelton and Christchurch. A rail tunnel was proposed through the mountain to link Lyttelton and Christchurch, but engineers had encountered particular tough basaltic rocks, which jeopardised the proposed route. As a result of Haast's work, the rail link was able to proceed. He became provincial geologist to Canterbury, a post that he held from 1861 to 1868.

His work in this capacity saw Haast conducting numerous expeditions throughout Canterbury and Westland, making geological discoveries and topographical maps of the area. Late in 1861, he discovered a coal seam in Kowai and the following year searched for gold in the area around Aoraki / Mount Cook. He identified that the Mackenzie plains were once the bed of a major glacier and, as well as his geological observations, he collected numerous botanical specimens. He discovered and named many of the glaciers of the central South Island, including the Franz Joseph Glacier, in honour of the Emperor of Austria, Franz Joseph. He was the first person to study the bones of the extinct Haast's eagle.

In 1868, Haast was appointed founding director of Canterbury Museum, a post he held until his death in 1887. The specimens that he collected on his expeditions of earlier years were a key part of the early holdings of the museum. Following the establishment of the Canterbury University College, he lectured in geology from 1873, and was made professor in 1876.

In the 1870s Haast was involved with James Hector in one of New Zealand's "most bitter scientific arguments", involving the extinction of the moa and Moa-hunter origins – the "Sumner Cave Controversy" (see Moriori in popular culture). Haast held that the Moriori Moa-hunters preceded Māori to New Zealand.

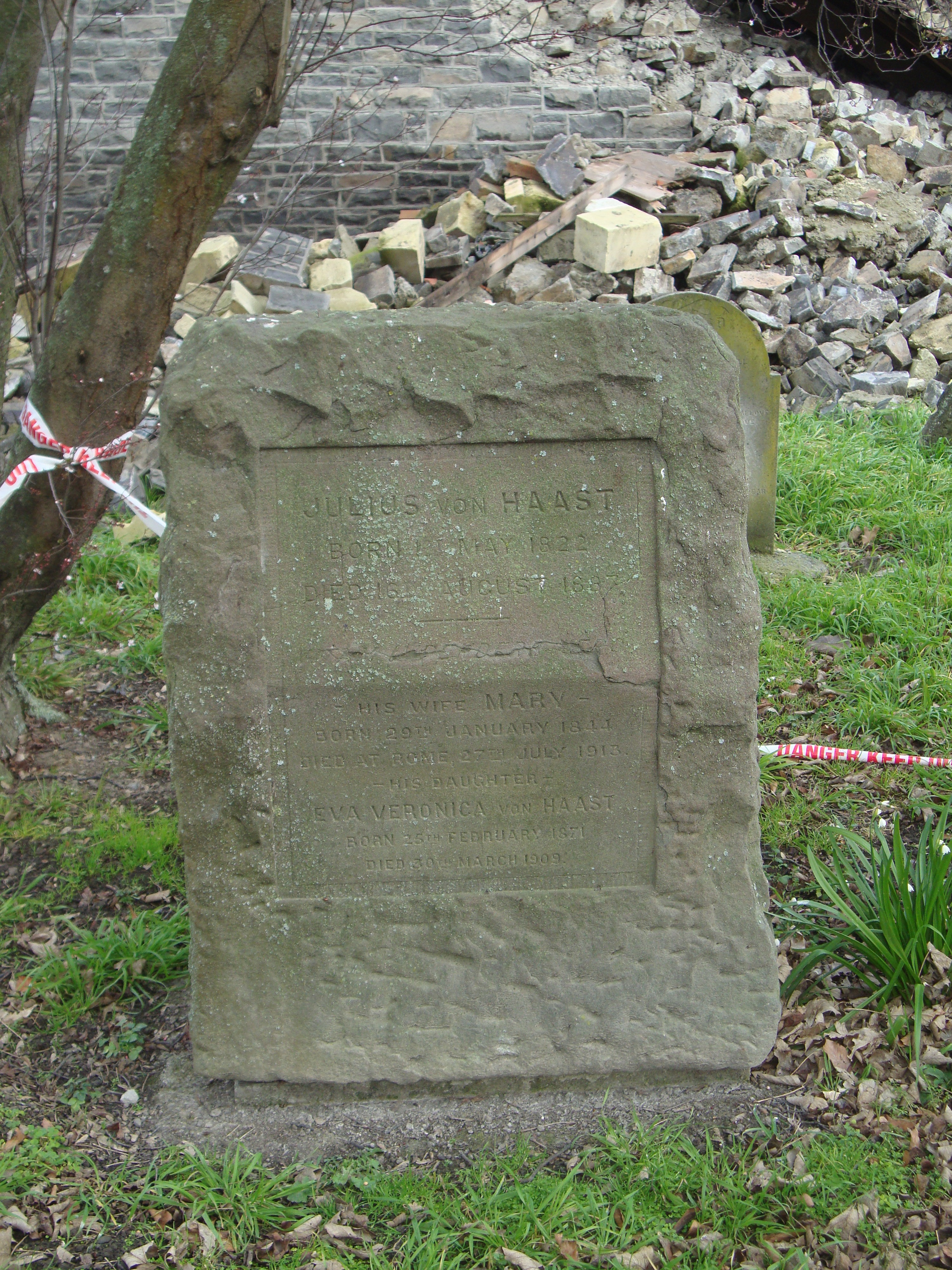
Haast's grave at Holy Trinity Avonside

His Geology of the Provinces of Canterbury and Westland, N.Z., was published in 1879. He was elected fellow of the Royal Society in 1867, and was given a hereditary knighthood by the Emperor of Austria in 1875. He was awarded the Royal Geographical Society's Patron's Medal in 1884 for his explorations in New Zealand.

== Later life and legacy ==
Haast travelled to England in 1886, as New Zealand's commissioner to the Colonial and Indian Exhibition in London. While there, he was made Knight Commander of the Order of St Michael and St George for his services. He had previously been made a Companion of the same order three years previously.

Haast died on 16 August 1887, following his return to Christchurch. He is buried in the grounds of Holy Trinity Church in Stanmore Road, Christchurch. He was survived by his second wife, Mary Dobson, daughter of the Canterbury Provincial Engineer Edward Dobson, and the couple's five children.

Several places in New Zealand are named after Haast, including Haast Pass and the Haast River (both named by him). The town of Haast is located at the mouth of the Haast River. The schist found in New Zealand is called the "Haast Schist" as a tribute to his contributions to geology. James Mackay (1831–1912) named two peaks after Haast: Mount Haast in the Southern Alps and Mount Haast near Springs Junction in the Buller District. The Haast Glacier and Haast Range in the Southern Alps were named by James Hector. The Haast Ridge was named by William Spotswood Green.

In 2019, Haast's personal papers held at the Alexander Turnbull Library, including many of Haast's artworks and his correspondence from Charles Darwin, were added to the UNESCO Memory of the World Aotearoa New Zealand Ngā Mahara o te Ao register.
