= Nina River =

Coordinates: 42°31′S 172°23′E

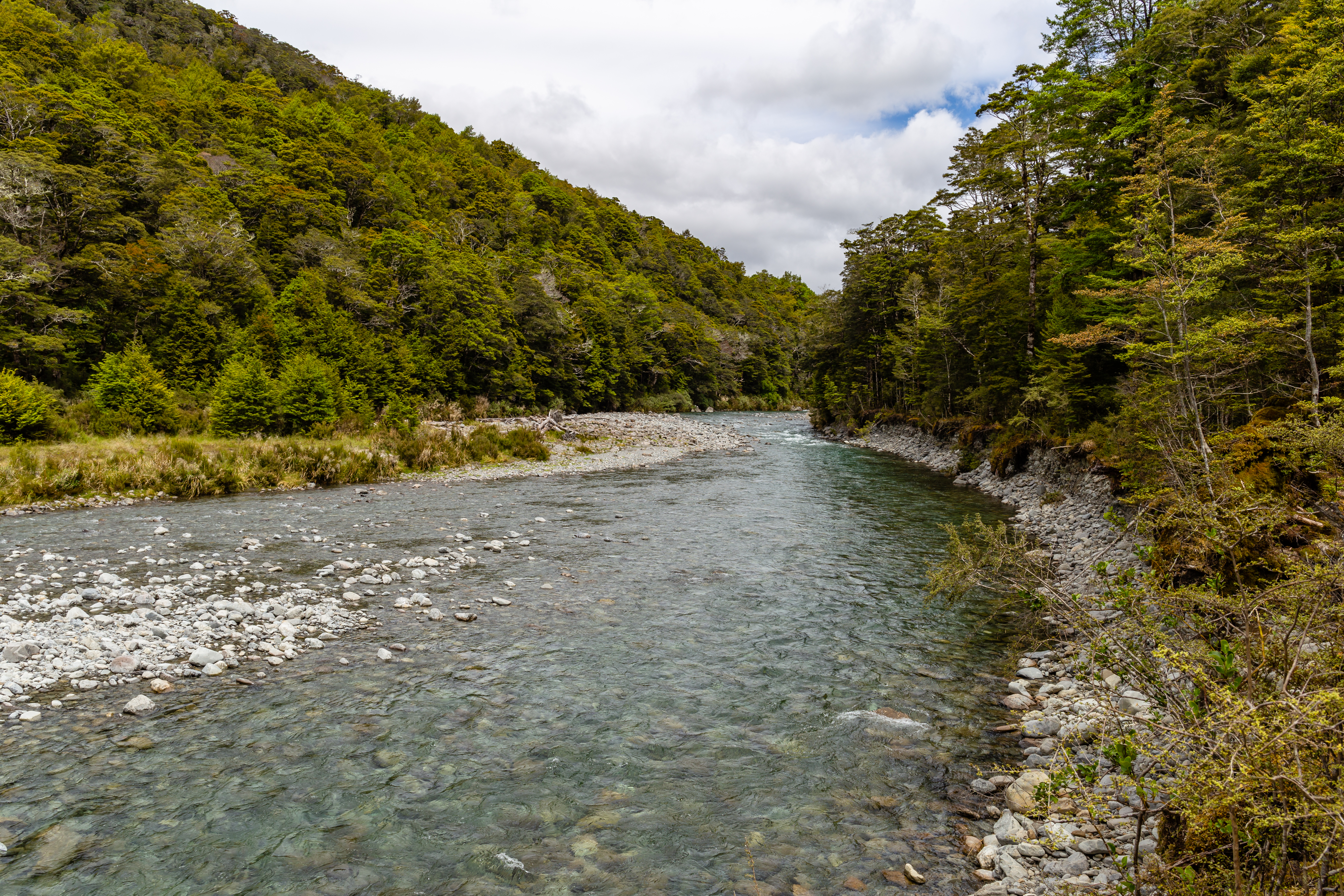

Location
- Country: New Zealand

Physical characteristics
- Source
  - location: Southern Alps
- Mouth
  - location: Boyle River
- Length: 18 km (11 mi)

The Nina River is a river of the north Canterbury region of New Zealand's South Island. It flows predominantly east from its source within Lake Sumner Forest Park, veering southeast shortly before it flows into the Lewis River 35 kilometres (22 mi) west of Hanmer Springs.

== See also ==
- List of rivers of New Zealand
