= Lake Christabel =

Lake in New Zealand

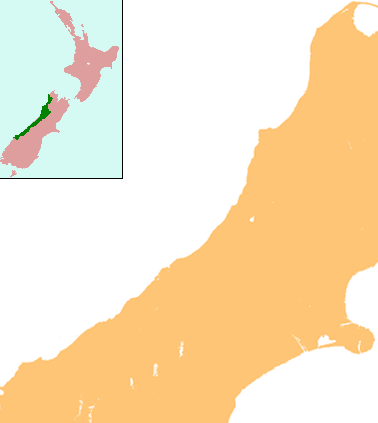
- Location within West Coast
- Location: Grey District, West Coast Region, South Island
- Coordinates: 42°25′S 172°14′E
- Primary outflows: Grey River
- Basin countries: New Zealand
- Surface area: 2.6 square kilometres (1.0 sq mi)
- Shore length^{1}: 8.9 kilometres (5.5 mi)
- Surface elevation: 655 metres (2,149 ft)
- ^{1} Shore length is not a well-defined measure.

Lake Christabel is a small lake in the north of New Zealand's South Island. It is located 12 kilometres southwest of the Lewis Pass. The lake is the source of the Grey River, one of the longest rivers on the South Island's West Coast, although its outlet is underground. The lake lies behind a landslide dam, thought to have been created by a prehistoric earthquake. The river runs under the debris for about 200 m (660 ft). A 1976 survey said it was, "one of the very few lakes in New Zealand in a natural, unmodified state". It estimated its depth at over 90 m (300 ft). Galaxias brevipinnis (climbing galaxias) and Anquilla dieffenbachii (longfin eel) were the only fish found.
