= Maruia =

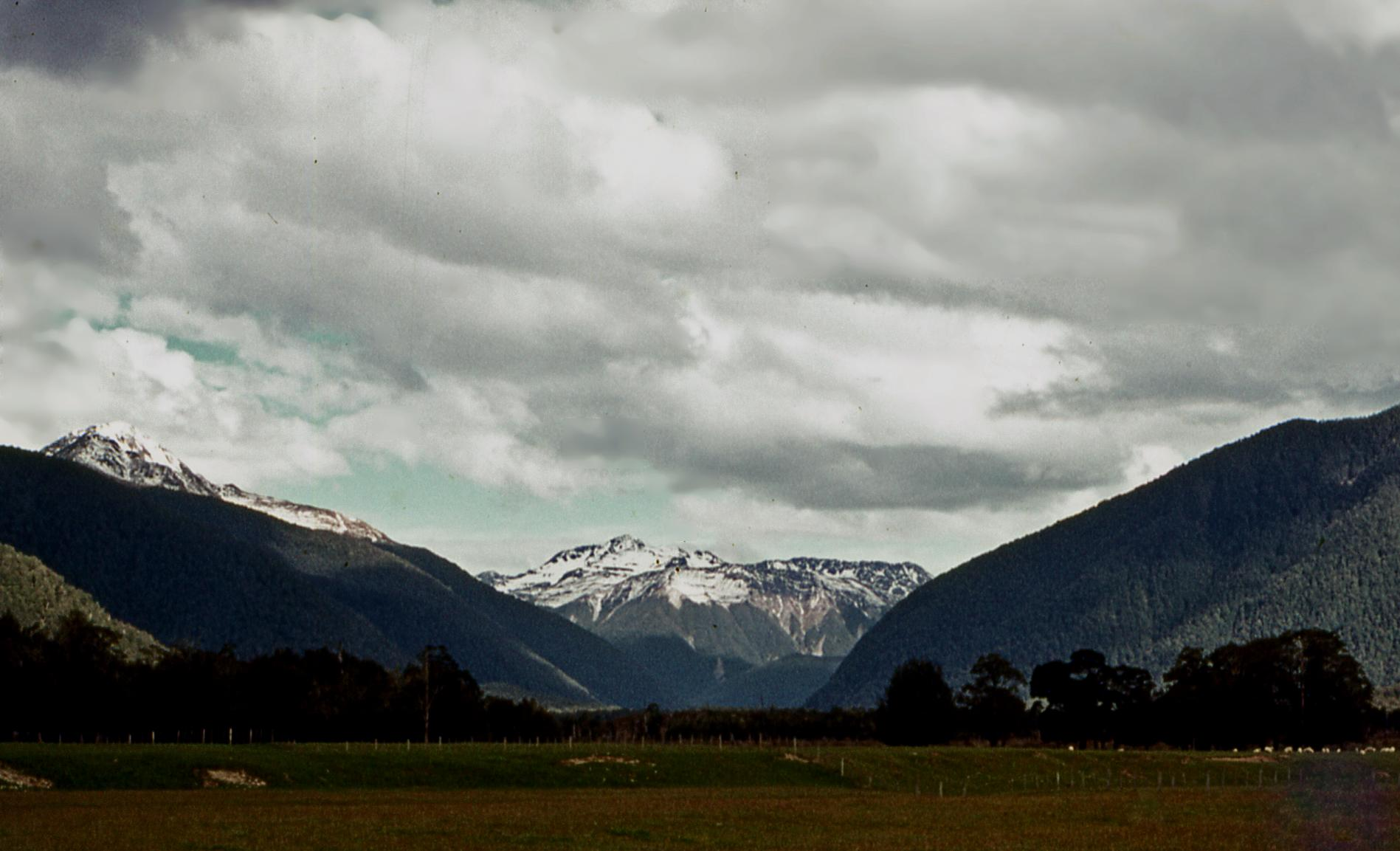
- Upper Maruia Valley, West Coast, New Zealand, 1976

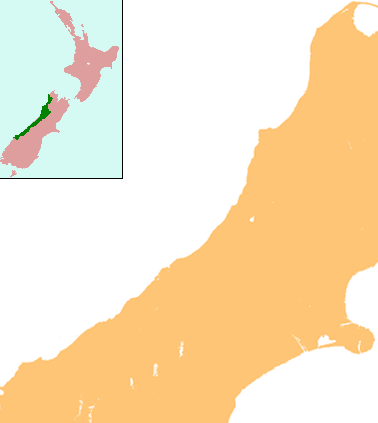
- Location within West Coast
- Coordinates: 42°11′20″S 172°13′13″E
- Country: New Zealand
- Region: West Coast
- District: Buller District
- Electorates: West Coast-Tasman; Te Tai Tonga

Population (223)
  - Total: 147

Maruia is a locality in the West Coast region of New Zealand. The Shenandoah Highway (State Highway 65) passes through it. Murchison is 65 km north, the Lewis Pass is 39 km to the south-east, and Reefton is 63 km west by road. The Maruia River flows past to the west.

Maruia was established as a Local Land District in 1905.

The principal activity is dairy farming. The Maruia Valley inspired the environmental lobby group, the Maruia Society (later changing its name to the Ecologic Foundation) and the Maruia Mail Order Catalogue, organised by the New Zealand Nature Company.

== Demographics ==
Maruia and its environs, which include Springs Junction, cover 1,076.14 km^{2} (415.50 sq mi) It is part of the larger Inangahua statistical area.

Historical population
Year	Pop.	±% p.a.
2006	174	—
2013	183	+0.72%
2018	126	−7.19%
2023	147	+3.13%

The area had a population of 147 in the 2023 New Zealand census, an increase of 21 people (16.7%) since the 2018 census, and a decrease of 36 people (−19.7%) since the 2013 census. There were 75 males, 72 females, and 3 people of other genders in 78 dwellings. The median age was 38.7 years (compared with 38.1 years nationally). There were 33 people (22.4%) aged under 15 years, 12 (8.2%) aged 15 to 29, 75 (51.0%) aged 30 to 64, and 30 (20.4%) aged 65 or older.

People could identify as more than one ethnicity. The results were 83.7% European (Pākehā), 6.1% Māori, 14.3% Asian, and 4.1% other, which includes people giving their ethnicity as "New Zealander". English was spoken by 98.0%, and other languages by 6.1%. No language could be spoken by 4.1% (e.g. too young to talk). The percentage of people born overseas was 18.4, compared with 28.8% nationally.

Religious affiliations were 22.4% Christian, and 2.0% other religions. People who answered that they had no religion were 67.3%, and 8.2% of people did not answer the census question.

Of those at least 15 years old, 21 (18.4%) people had a bachelor's or higher degree, 60 (52.6%) had a post-high school certificate or diploma, and 36 (31.6%) people exclusively held high school qualifications. The median income was $35,200, compared with $41,500 nationally. 6 people (5.3%) earned over $100,000 compared to 12.1% nationally. The employment status of those at least 15 was 63 (55.3%) full-time, 15 (13.2%) part-time, and 3 (2.6%) unemployed.

== Education ==
Maruia School is a coeducational full primary (years 1–8) school with a roll of 17 students as of July 2026. It opened in 1895.
