= Mātakitaki River =

River in the South Island, New Zealand

Coordinates: 41°48′S 172°19′E

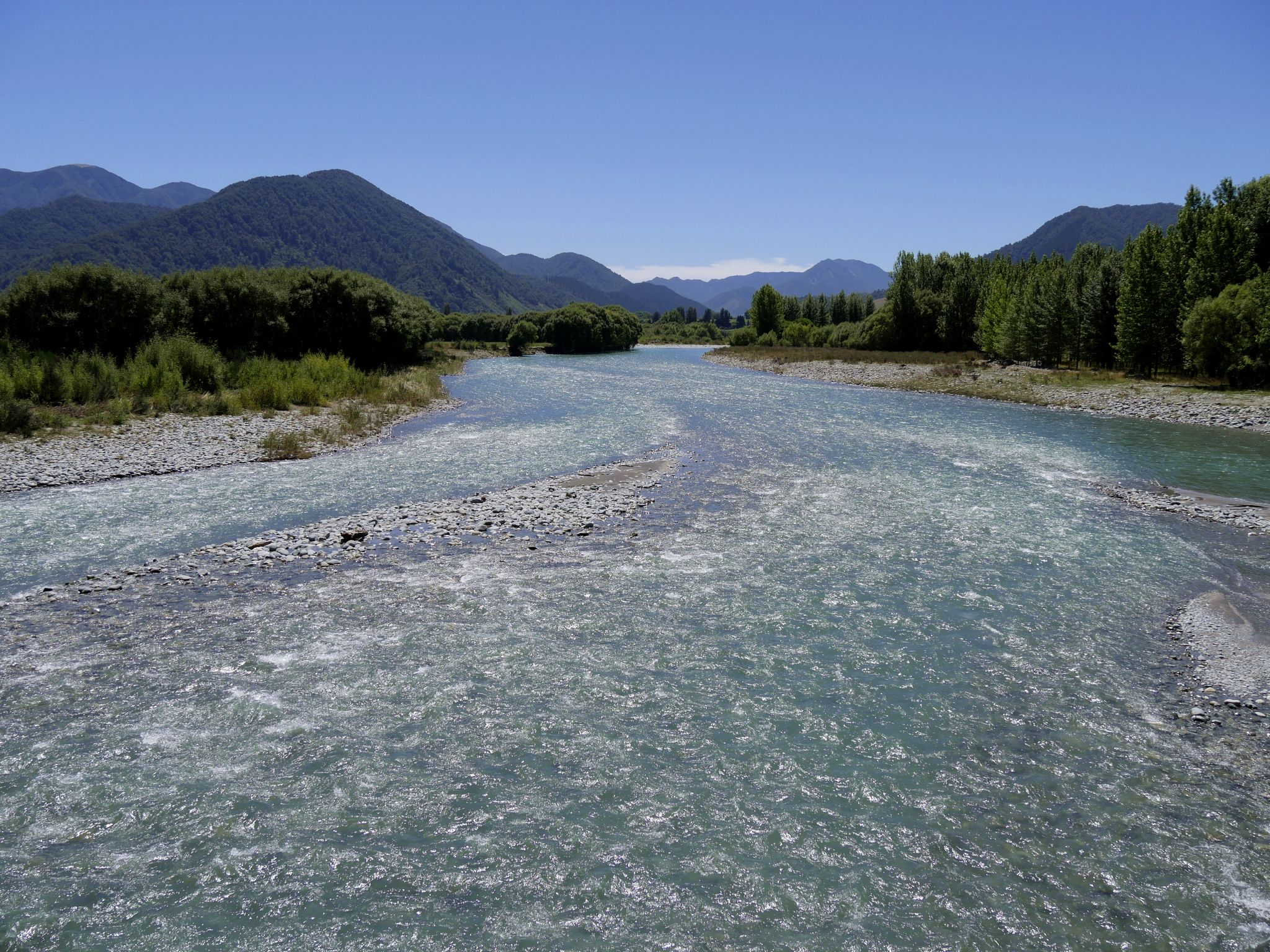
Mātakitaki River looking north

The Mātakitaki River is located in the north of New Zealand's South Island. An upper tributary of the Buller River, it flows north and west for 65 kilometres from its source north of the Lewis Pass, joining the Buller at Murchison. It has one major tributary, the Glenroy River.

== Whitewater recreation ==
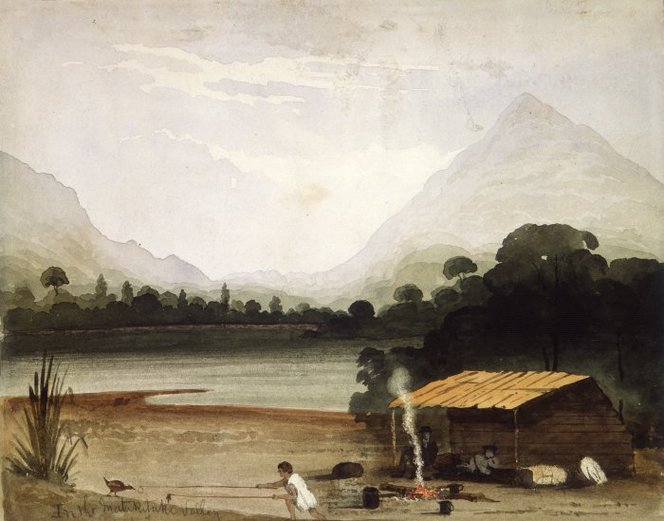
Painting by William Fox from 1847 during the exploration by Thomas Brunner and Charles Heaphy, who are resting in the shelter, with their Māori guide snaring a weka

The river has two excellent whitewater sections on it, and they are frequently paddled. The "Middle Mātakitaki" section is about 10 km up the valley from Murchison, and is Grade/Class 2+, with some excellent play spots. The "Lower Mātakitaki" section is a short distance up the river from Murchison, and is a short technical run pushing Grade/Class 3+ at medium flows, Grade/Class 4 at higher flows.

The Mātakitaki River and tributaries are known for gold mining, both historically and today. Alluvial gold is regarded as having a high purity and is often found in the coarse form. Many river flats are subject to mining, including two dredging operations situated within the riverbed within the "Lower" and "Middle" sections.

== Trout fishing ==
It is an extremely important fishery and highly regarded not only for the numbers caught, but also as a trophy river.

== Hydroelectric power ==
Network Tasman have proposed a 30 MW hydroelectric power station for the river. Whitewater NZ say it will interfere with the popular Middle Mātakitaki whitewater run. Network Tasman announced that plans to investigate the river for hydro development are on hold due to economic conditions.
