= State Highway 65 (New Zealand) =

Road in New Zealand

State Highway 65

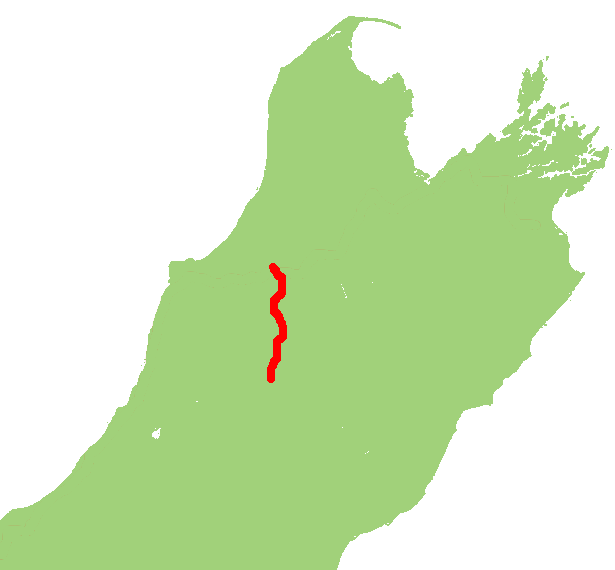

Route information
- Maintained by NZ Transport Agency Waka Kotahi
- Length: 71.7 km (44.6 mi)

Major junctions
- North end: SH 6 near Murchison
- South end: SH 7 at Springs Junction

Location
- Country: New Zealand
- Primary destinations: Shenandoah, Maruia

Highway system
- New Zealand state highways; Motorways and expressways; List
← SH 63	→ SH 67

State Highway 65 (also known as the Shenandoah Highway) is a New Zealand state highway in the South Island. It is 71 km long and runs south to north down the Maruia river valley from SH 7 at Springs Junction, 15 km west of the main divide at the Lewis Pass, to SH 6 in the Buller Gorge, 11 km west of Murchison. It forms part of the most direct route between Christchurch and Nelson. It takes its name from a small settlement toward its northern end.

The road is sealed and two-lane, with some single-lane bridges. The surrounding country is used for pastoral farming (beef and dairy) with some forestry on the surrounding hills. Springs Junction is the only locality with fuel or food along the route while Maruia is the largest settlement along the route.

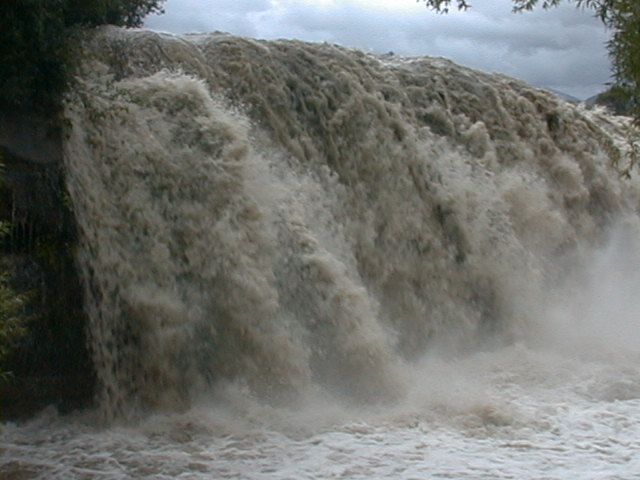
Maruia Falls following heavy rain.

Maruia Falls, a 5-m waterfall near the road, did not exist prior to the 1929 Murchison earthquake (magnitude 7.8).

In 2019 a part of the road between Murchison and Maruia faced erosion from the Maruia River, caused by heavy rain.

== See also ==
- List of New Zealand state highways
