= Mount Haast (Westland District) =

Mountain in Westland District, New Zealand

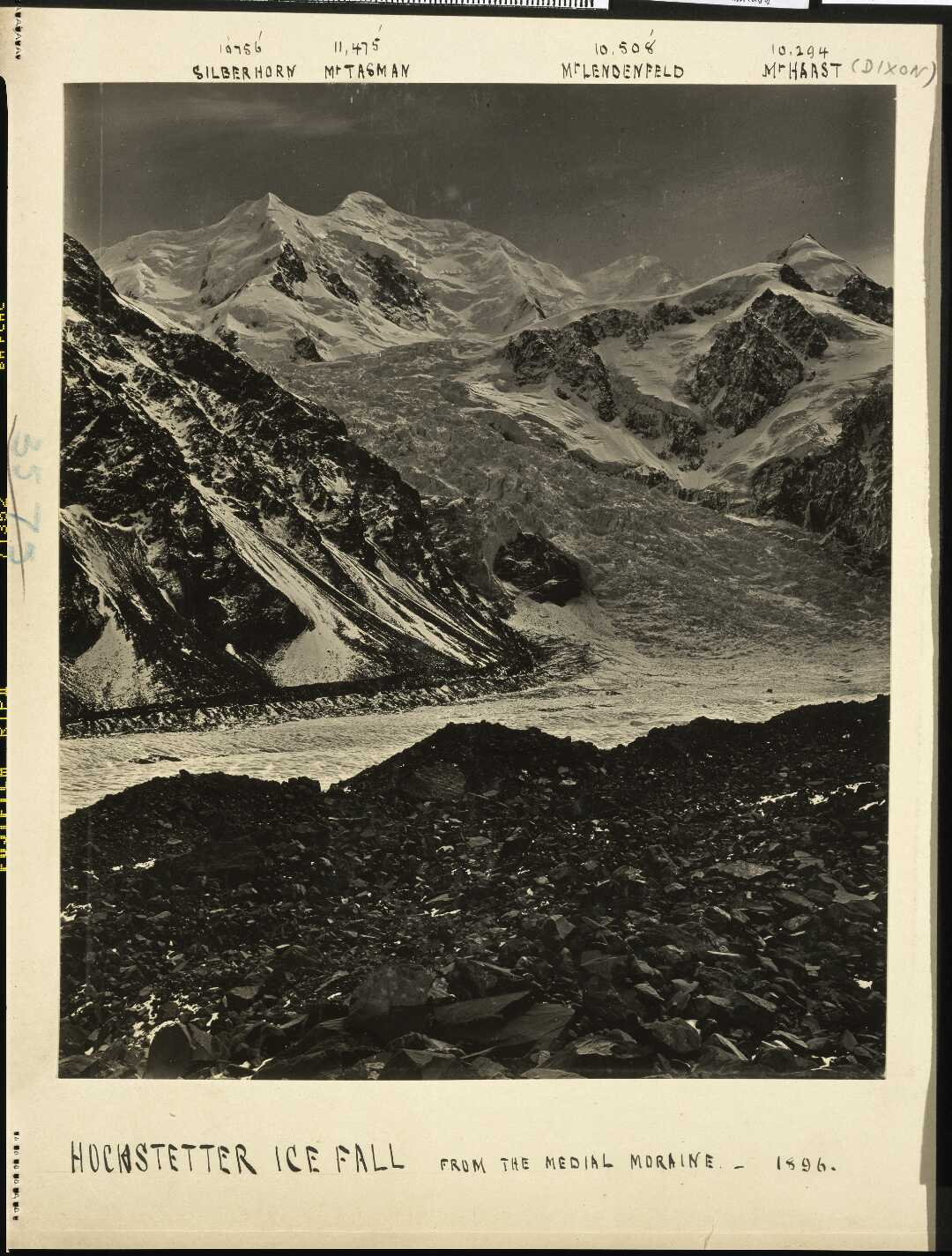
- Mount Haast (right), with the Hochstetter Glacier in the foreground

Highest point
- Elevation: 3,114 m (10,217 ft)
- Prominence: 127 m (417 ft)
- Isolation: 0.5 km (0.31 mi)
- Coordinates: 43°33′32″S 170°10′40″E

Naming
- Etymology: Julius von Haast

Geography
- Location within New Zealand
- Location: West Coast, New Zealand
- Parent range: Southern Alps

Mount Haast (3,114 metres or 10,217 feet) is a mountain summit located in the Southern Alps / Kā Tiritiri o te Moana, in the Westland District of New Zealand. The mountain was named after the German-born geologist Julius von Haast by James Mackay (1831–1912).

== Description ==
Mount Haast is located just north off the Main Divide and is thus located in Westland District. It is made up of three peaks, the highest of which is at 3,114 metres (10,217 ft). The two secondary peaks are both north of the main peak and are at 3,099 metres (10,167 ft) and 3,065 metres (10,056 ft). The peaks are located at the head of the Albert Glacier (the original name of the glacier, but the lower part was renamed Fox Glacier). The first ascent, via the Marcel Col, was in February 1907 by Alex Graham and Henry Newton.

Mount Haast was named by James Mackay. Mackay named two peaks after Haast; the other Mount Haast is a hill (1,587 metres or 5,207 feet) located near Springs Junction in the Buller District.
