= State Highway 7 (New Zealand) =

Road in New Zealand

State Highway 7

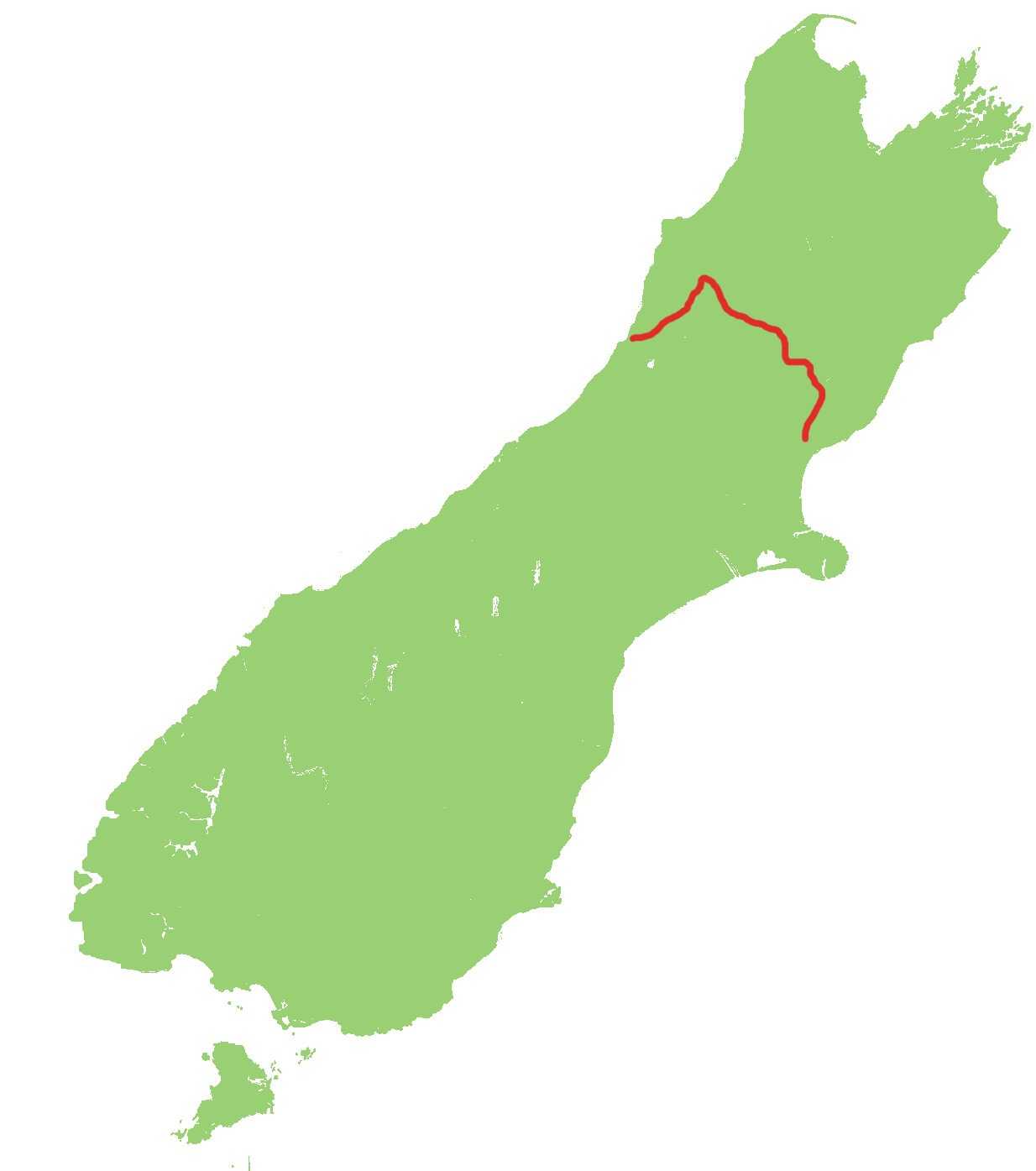

Route information
- Maintained by NZ Transport Agency Waka Kotahi
- Length: 272 km (169 mi)
- Tourist routes: Alpine Pacific Triangle between Hanmer Junction and Waipara

Major junctions
- East end: SH 1 (Omihi Road/Glasnevin Road) at Waipara
- West end: SH 6 (Cobden Road/Smith Street) at Greymouth

Location
- Country: New Zealand
- Primary destinations: Culverden, Maruia Springs, Springs Junction, Reefton

Highway system
- New Zealand state highways; Motorways and expressways; List
← SH 6	→ SH 8

State Highway 7 is a major New Zealand state highway. One of the eight national highways, it crosses the Southern Alps to link the West Coast Region with Canterbury and to form a link between the South Island's two longest highways, State Highway 1 and State Highway 6. Distances are measured from east to west with the major junction list going from east to west.

For most of its length SH 7 is a two-lane single carriageway, with at-grade intersections and property accesses, both in rural and urban areas. There are a number of passing lanes at irregular intervals through the rural sections. The New Zealand Transport Agency classifies SH 7 as a primary collector highway, preferring State Highway 73 via Arthur's Pass as the strategic highway between Canterbury and the West Coast.

== Route ==
The highway leaves SH 1 at Waipara, some 60 kilometres north of Christchurch, and initially heads north, crossing several rivers and skirting the Balmoral State Forest. After crossing the Hurunui River there is a 13.7 km straight, the longest straight section of highway in New Zealand. Just north of Culverden, it reaches the valley of the Waiau River and turns west to the course of this river and its tributary the Lewis River up the valley to the 907-metre Lewis Pass, the northernmost of the three main road passes across the Southern Alps.

On the western side of the pass, the highway enters the small spa town of Maruia Springs, before continuing northwest along the valley of the Maruia River to Springs Junction, where it meets SH 65. From here, the highway crosses a smaller pass, the Rahu Saddle, before following the valley of the Inangahua River to the town of Reefton.

From Reefton, the highway turns southwest at the intersection with SH 69, following the course of the Grey River to within two kilometres of its mouth at Greymouth, where SH 7 terminates at its junction with SH 6.

== Spur sections ==
SH 7 has one spur, designated State Highway 7A. This 9.4 kilometre stretch links State Highway 7 at the Waiau bridge with the alpine thermal resort town of Hanmer Springs.

== Major intersections ==
Territorial authority	Location	km	mi	Destinations	Notes
Hurunui District	Waipara	0	0.0	SH 1 north (Omihi Road) – Cheviot, Picton; SH 1 south (Glasnevin Road) – Amberley, Christchurch	SH 7 begins
Hurunui District	Culverden	44	27	Alpine Pacific Triangle (Rotherham South Road) – Mt Lyford Village, Kaikōura	via the Inland Kaikōura Road
Hurunui District	Tekoa Range	68	42	SH 7A (Hanmer Springs Road) – Hanmer Springs	
Hurunui District / Buller District boundary	Maruia Springs	131	81	Lewis Pass 864 m (2,835 ft)	
Buller District	Springs Junction	152	94	SH 65 (Shenandoah Highway) – Murchison, Nelson	
Buller District	Reefton	196	122	SH 69 (Sinnamon Street) – Westport, Nelson	
Grey District	Greymouth	272	169	SH 6 south (Smith Street) – Hokitika, Haast; SH 6 north (Cobden Road) – Runanga, Westport	SH 7 ends
