= Glenroy River =

- Route of the Glenroy River
- Mouth of the Glenroy River Glenroy River (New Zealand)

Location
- Country: New Zealand
- District: Tasman

Physical characteristics
- Source: Glenroy River (main branch)
  - location: Spenser Mountains
  - coordinates: 42.3002°S 172.4333°E
- 2nd source: Glenroy River East Branch
  - coordinates: 42.0867°S 172.4059°E
- Mouth: Mātakitaki River
  - coordinates: 42°00′04″S 172°20′05″E

Basin features
- Progression: Glenroy River → Mātakitaki River → Buller River → Tasman Sea
- River system: Buller River
- Tributaries
  - left: Mount Cann Creek, Granity Creek
  - right: Branch Creek, Pedro Creek, Shale Creek, Cascade Creek, Davis Creek

The Glenroy River is the main tributary of the Mātakitaki River in the north of New Zealand's South Island.. It rises in the Spenser Mountains before flowing north for roughly 40 km (25 mi) to its confluence with the Mātakitaki River. Despite its remote location, the river and its surrounding valley are used for a variety of recreational uses, including hunting and fishing. The river itself is regarded as a short class IV river for rafting, due to rapids along the river's length.
