= Grey River (New Zealand) =

River in the South Island of New Zealand

Coordinates: 42.4417°S 171.1952°E

Grey River / Māwheranui
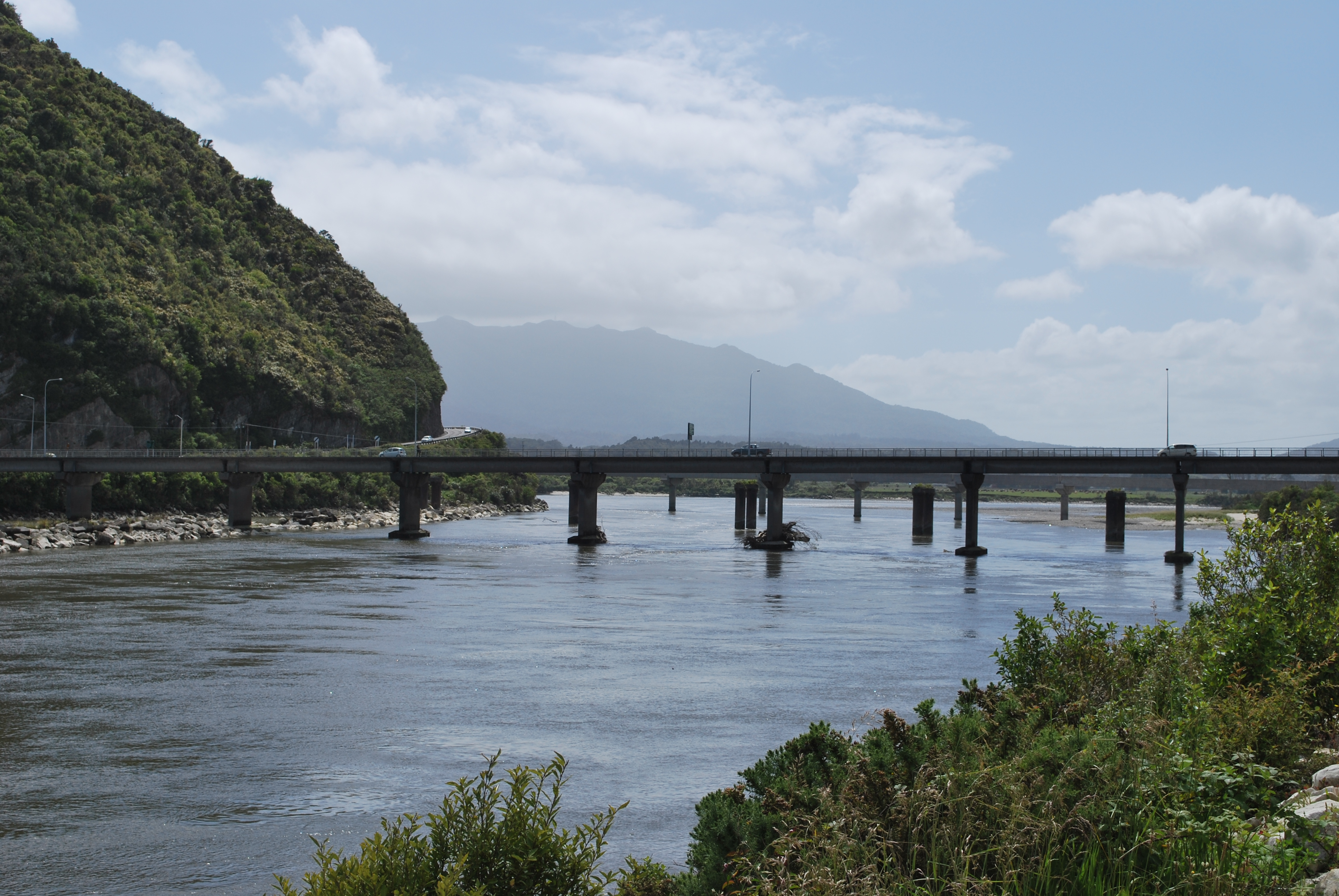
- Cobden Bridge over the Grey River near its mouth at Greymouth

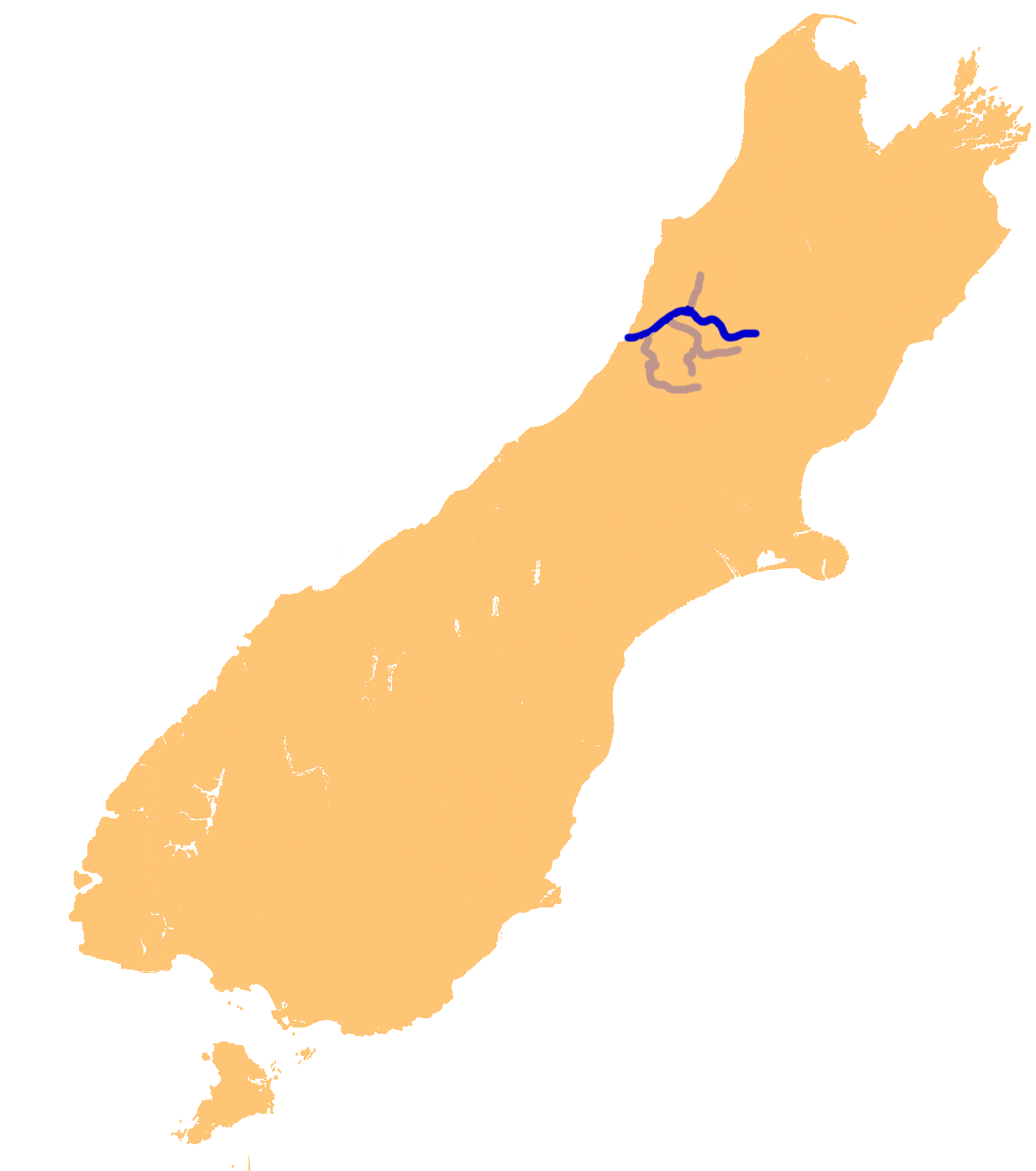
- The Grey River system
- Etymology: George Grey
- Native name: Māwheranui (Māori)

Location
- Country: New Zealand
- Region: West Coast
- Cities: Stillwater, Cobden, Greymouth

Physical characteristics
- Source: Southern Alps (Saint Arnaud Range)
  - location: Lake Christabel, New Zealand
- Mouth: Tasman Sea
  - location: New Zealand
  - elevation: 0 m (0 ft)
- Discharge
  - average: 280 m^{3}/s (9,900 cu ft/s)

The Grey River / Māwheranui is located in the northwest of the South Island of New Zealand. It rises 12 kilometres southwest of the Lewis Pass in Lake Christabel, one of numerous small lakes on the western side of the Southern Alps, and runs westward for 120 kilometres before draining into the Tasman Sea at Greymouth. Thomas Brunner, who explored the area in the late 1840s, named the river in honour of Sir George Grey, who first served as Governor of New Zealand from 1845 to 1854. The Ngāi Tahu Claims Settlement Act 1998 changed the official name of the river to Grey River / Māwheranui in 1998. The Māori name for the river system and surrounding area is Māwhera, with Māwheranui being distinguished from the northern branch Little Grey River / Māwheraiti.

The New Zealand Ministry for Culture and Heritage gives a translation of "broad and widespread (river mouth)" for Māwheranui.

Numerous small rivers are tributaries of the Grey, and several of them also drain lakes. Notable among these are the Ahaura River and the Arnold River, the latter of which is the outflow of Lake Brunner, the largest lake of the northwest South Island. A small hydroelectric station stands on the river 25 kilometres upstream from the mouth.

The Grey River's mouth is protected by a large sandbar, Greymouth bar, which is a notorious danger to shipping.

Raw sewage discharges into the Grey River after heavy rainfall. Historically, sewage and stormwater from Greymouth, Cobden and Blaketown were discharged without treatment directly into the Grey River. Changes to the Grey District Council's wastewater schemes provide separation and treatment for sewage, except during periods of high rainfall, such as spring, when the capacity of the sewage treatment is exceeded.
