= Lewis Pass =

Mountain pass in New Zealand

- Location within New Zealand
- Elevation: 907 metres (2,976 ft)
- Traversed by: State Highway 7

Third Approach
- Location: New Zealand
- Range: Southern Alps
- Coordinates: 42°22′47″S 172°24′00″E

Lewis Pass is the northernmost of the three main mountain passes through the Southern Alps in the South Island of New Zealand. With an elevation of 907 metres, it is slightly lower than Arthur's Pass and higher than Haast Pass.

The pass is the saddle between the valleys of the Maruia River to the northwest in the West Coast Region and the Lewis River to the southeast in north Canterbury. The small spa of Maruia Springs is close to the saddle, on the West Coast side.

Lewis Pass is named after Henry Lewis who, together with Christopher Maling, was the first European to discover the pass, in April 1860 while working as a surveyor of the Nelson Provincial Survey Department. Before this time the pass was used by the Ngāi Tahu Māori of Canterbury to transport pounamu (greenstone) from the west coast.

State Highway 7 traverses the pass. The road officially opened on Saturday 30 October 1937. It had a regular bus route over it until Intercity's service was replaced by a seasonal shuttle.

The highway passes through extensive unmodified native beech forest. The area around the pass is protected as a national reserve, the Lewis Pass National Scenic Reserve, which was gazetted in 1981. There are a number of tramping routes in the Lewis Pass area, including the St James Walkway. The short Alpine Nature Walk loop walk around an alpine wetland and tarn is accessed from a carpark near the saddle.

== Gallery ==
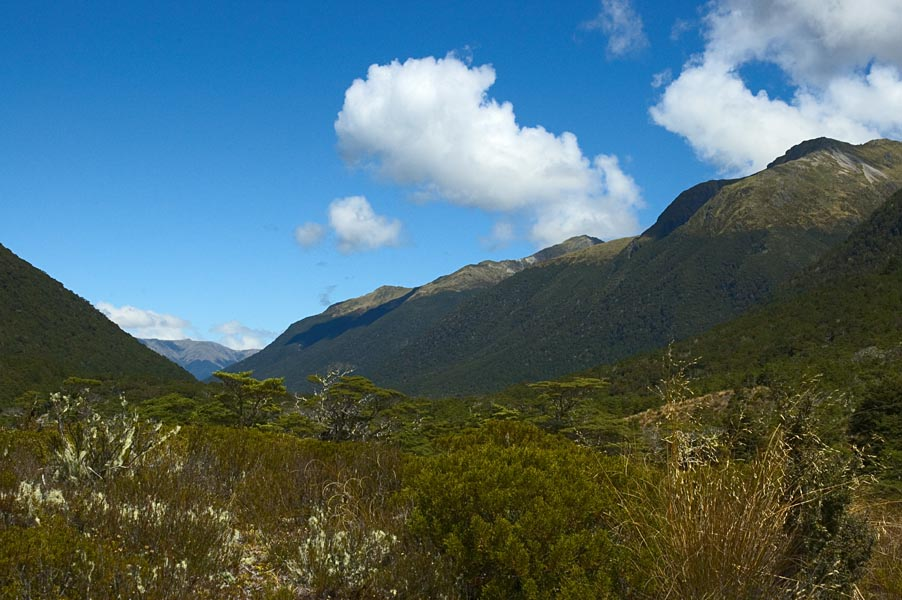
Lewis Pass

== Climate ==
Climate data for Boyle River Lodge, elevation 600 m (2,000 ft), (1991–2020 normals, 1982–present)
Month	Jan	Feb	Mar	Apr	May	Jun	Jul	Aug	Sep	Oct	Nov	Dec	Year
Record high °C (°F)	35.0 (95.0)	35.0 (95.0)	31.0 (87.8)	27.9 (82.2)	27.6 (81.7)	18.1 (64.6)	17.0 (62.6)	23.4 (74.1)	22.5 (72.5)	27.3 (81.1)	30.5 (86.9)	31.5 (88.7)	35.0 (95.0)
Mean maximum °C (°F)	30.5 (86.9)	29.9 (85.8)	27.2 (81.0)	22.8 (73.0)	19.3 (66.7)	14.5 (58.1)	13.5 (56.3)	16.6 (61.9)	19.8 (67.6)	23.5 (74.3)	25.7 (78.3)	28.5 (83.3)	31.5 (88.7)
Mean daily maximum °C (°F)	22.6 (72.7)	22.8 (73.0)	20.1 (68.2)	16.2 (61.2)	12.5 (54.5)	9.2 (48.6)	8.7 (47.7)	10.8 (51.4)	13.4 (56.1)	15.6 (60.1)	17.9 (64.2)	20.5 (68.9)	15.9 (60.6)
Daily mean °C (°F)	15.8 (60.4)	15.6 (60.1)	13.4 (56.1)	10.1 (50.2)	7.2 (45.0)	4.4 (39.9)	3.7 (38.7)	5.4 (41.7)	7.7 (45.9)	9.6 (49.3)	11.6 (52.9)	14.1 (57.4)	9.9 (49.8)
Mean daily minimum °C (°F)	9.0 (48.2)	8.5 (47.3)	6.7 (44.1)	4.0 (39.2)	1.9 (35.4)	−0.4 (31.3)	−1.2 (29.8)	0.0 (32.0)	2.1 (35.8)	3.6 (38.5)	5.2 (41.4)	7.7 (45.9)	3.9 (39.1)
Mean minimum °C (°F)	2.4 (36.3)	1.5 (34.7)	−0.2 (31.6)	−1.9 (28.6)	−4.6 (23.7)	−6.1 (21.0)	−7.0 (19.4)	−5.9 (21.4)	−4.8 (23.4)	−2.8 (27.0)	−0.9 (30.4)	1.5 (34.7)	−7.7 (18.1)
Record low °C (°F)	−0.1 (31.8)	−3.8 (25.2)	−2.2 (28.0)	−4.2 (24.4)	−8.5 (16.7)	−11.4 (11.5)	−9.7 (14.5)	−9.0 (15.8)	−9.7 (14.5)	−6.0 (21.2)	−3.2 (26.2)	−5.0 (23.0)	−11.4 (11.5)
Average rainfall mm (inches)	142.5 (5.61)	106.4 (4.19)	128.0 (5.04)	150.5 (5.93)	189.9 (7.48)	183.3 (7.22)	164.5 (6.48)	161.2 (6.35)	195.6 (7.70)	227.9 (8.97)	191.8 (7.55)	179.9 (7.08)	2,021.5 (79.6)
Source: NIWA
