= Springs Junction =

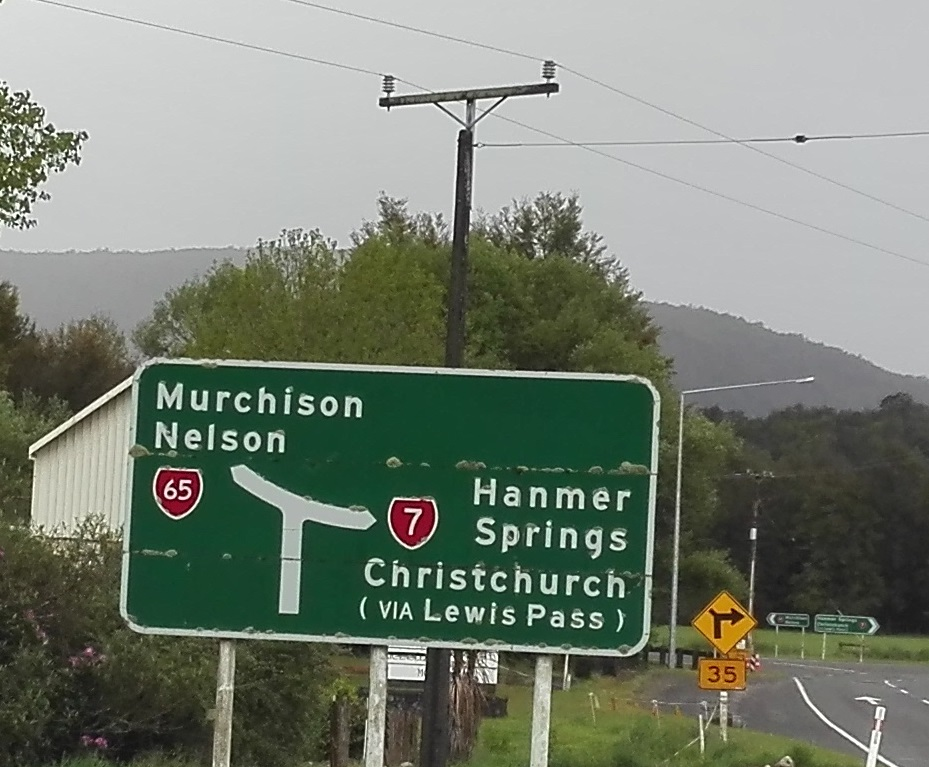
- Approaching the junction from the West Coast along State Highway 7
- Interactive map of Springs Junction

Location
- Springs Junction, New Zealand
- Coordinates: 42.334618°S 172.181816°E
- Roads at junction: State Highway 7 State Highway 65

Construction
- Type: Three-way junction

Springs Junction is a small settlement and road junction in the West Coast region of New Zealand. It lies at the junction of State Highway 7 and State Highway 65 (the Shenandoah Highway), 45 km (28 mi) east of Reefton, on the main route between Christchurch and the Nelson, Tasman and Buller districts.

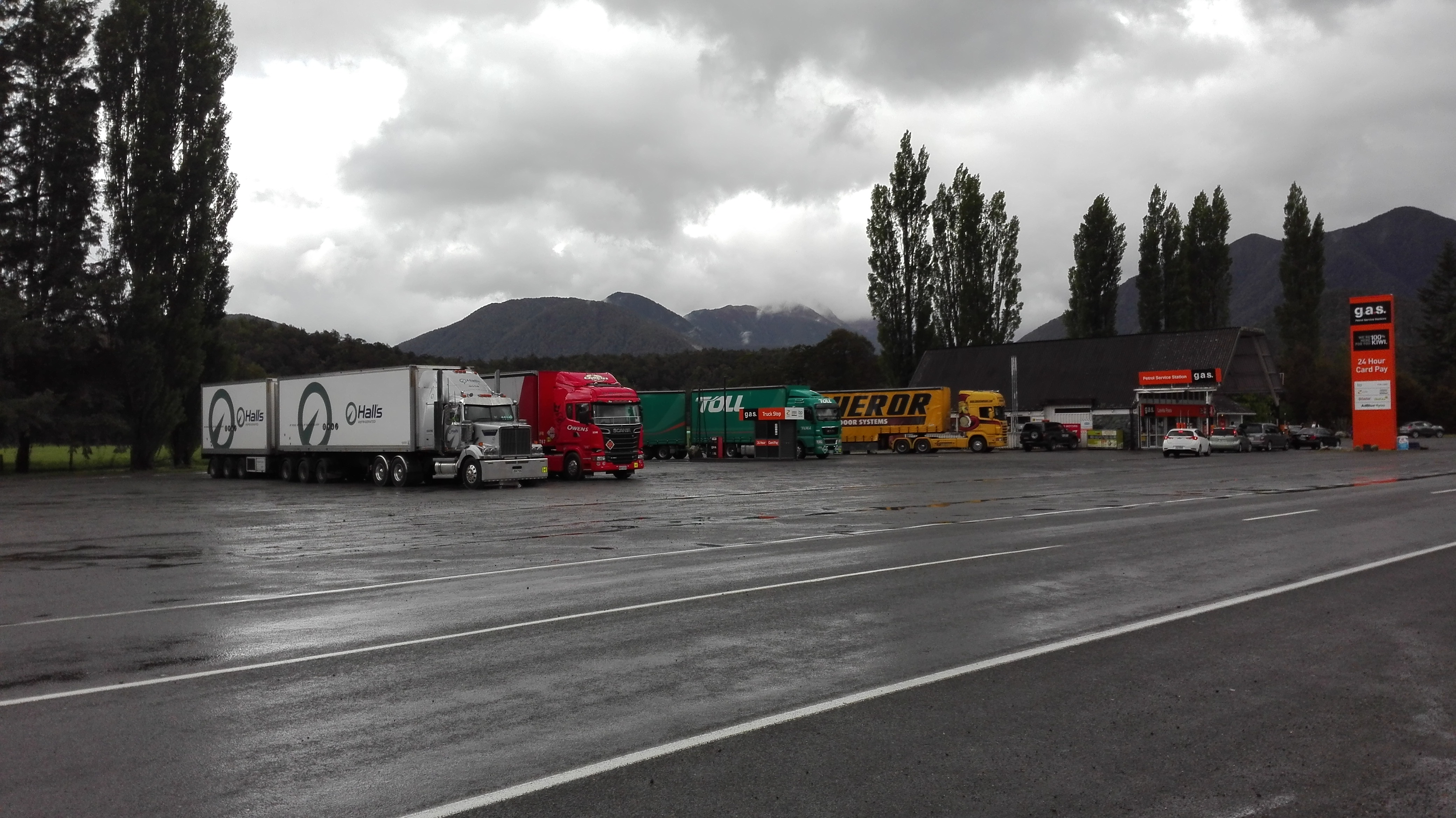
The GAS petrol station at Springs Junction.

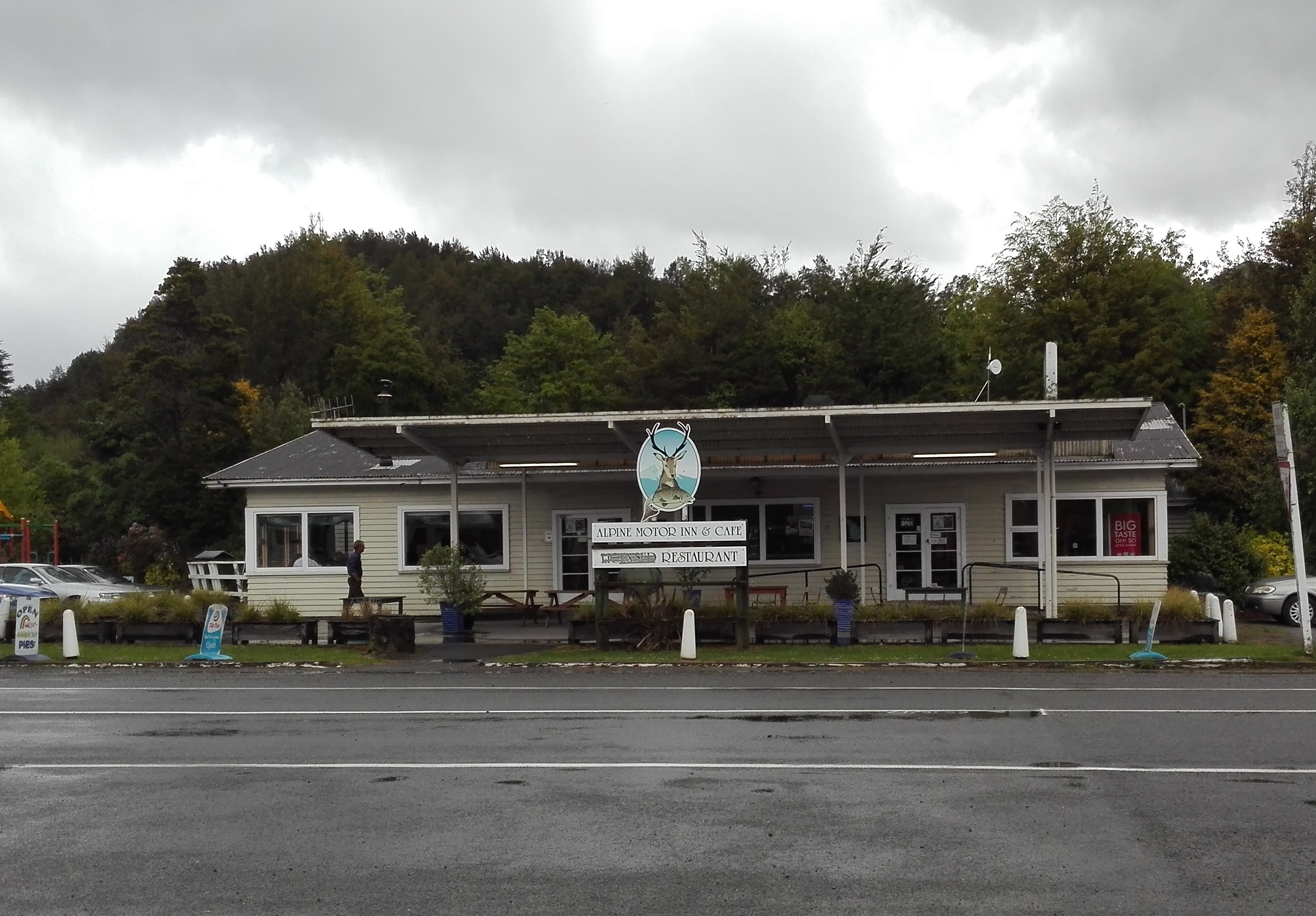
The café at Springs Junction.

Demographics for the area are covered at Maruia.

== Geography ==
Springs Junction lies on the Alpine Fault. At Springs Junction is a site where geologists have dug trenches to study past earthquakes along the Alpine Fault.

16 km to the east is the thermal resort of Maruia Springs. 6.5 km to the east is the DOC Marble Hill campsite

Springs Junction saw a major increase in traffic flow after the 2016 Kaikōura earthquake. This earthquake closed the main State Highway 1 route and Springs Junction was on the alternative route from Picton to Christchurch. The New Zealand Transport Agency expected the volume of traffic to quadruple while the State Highway 1 route underwent months of repairs.

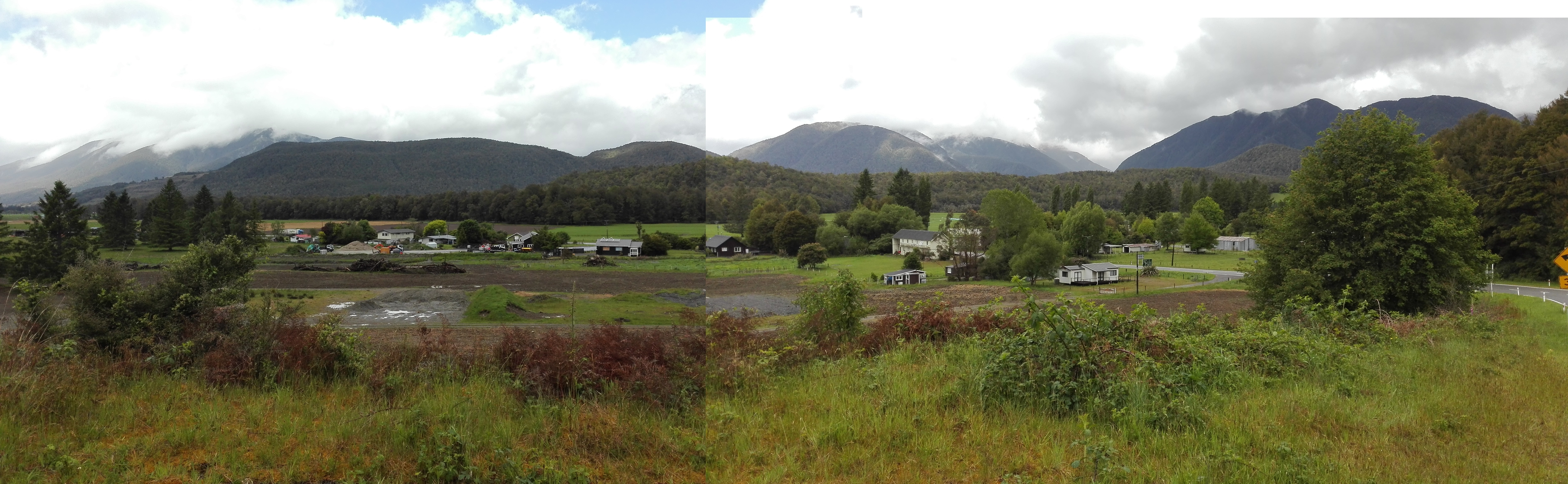
Panoramic view of Springs Junction settlement.

== Amenities ==
The settlement includes two petrol stations (GAS and NPD), a café (closed as of March 2023), and some houses.

In July 2022, the government funded the construction of two electric vehicle DC charging stations at Springs Junction. The chargers will fill the gap between Culverden, Reefton and Murchison. As the line supplying Springs Junction is already near capacity, a battery energy storage system will also be installed to defer a supply upgrade.

== Notable people ==
Daniel White (born 1992), author of Halfstone: A Tale of the Narathlands

== Climate ==
Climate data for Springs Junction, elevation 412 m (1,352 ft), (1981–2010 normals, extremes 1976–1994)
Month	Jan	Feb	Mar	Apr	May	Jun	Jul	Aug	Sep	Oct	Nov	Dec	Year
Record high °C (°F)	31.2 (88.2)	32.0 (89.6)	27.2 (81.0)	24.5 (76.1)	18.0 (64.4)	14.8 (58.6)	13.1 (55.6)	16.9 (62.4)	23.0 (73.4)	24.0 (75.2)	26.5 (79.7)	29.7 (85.5)	32.0 (89.6)
Mean daily maximum °C (°F)	21.0 (69.8)	21.6 (70.9)	19.2 (66.6)	15.4 (59.7)	11.8 (53.2)	8.8 (47.8)	8.3 (46.9)	10.1 (50.2)	13.0 (55.4)	14.6 (58.3)	17.9 (64.2)	19.5 (67.1)	15.1 (59.2)
Daily mean °C (°F)	15.1 (59.2)	15.2 (59.4)	13.3 (55.9)	9.8 (49.6)	7.0 (44.6)	4.4 (39.9)	3.6 (38.5)	5.3 (41.5)	7.7 (45.9)	9.5 (49.1)	11.9 (53.4)	13.9 (57.0)	9.7 (49.5)
Mean daily minimum °C (°F)	9.1 (48.4)	8.8 (47.8)	7.3 (45.1)	4.2 (39.6)	2.1 (35.8)	0.0 (32.0)	−1.1 (30.0)	0.4 (32.7)	2.3 (36.1)	4.4 (39.9)	5.9 (42.6)	8.3 (46.9)	4.3 (39.7)
Record low °C (°F)	0.7 (33.3)	0.1 (32.2)	−2.5 (27.5)	−5.0 (23.0)	−8.0 (17.6)	−8.8 (16.2)	−9.2 (15.4)	−7.0 (19.4)	−7.1 (19.2)	−6.4 (20.5)	−2.0 (28.4)	−2.0 (28.4)	−9.2 (15.4)
Average rainfall mm (inches)	230.2 (9.06)	124.3 (4.89)	169.1 (6.66)	147.3 (5.80)	214.4 (8.44)	208.8 (8.22)	251.7 (9.91)	192.1 (7.56)	212.7 (8.37)	261.2 (10.28)	182.5 (7.19)	256.1 (10.08)	2,450.4 (96.46)
Source: NIWA
