= Maruia River =

River in the South Island, New Zealand

Coordinates: 41.787217°S 172.209148°E

The Maruia River (dark) showing the Buller River (light).

The Maruia River is located in the northwestern South Island of New Zealand. It is a major tributary of the Buller River, flowing for 80 km before joining the larger river eight kilometres to the west of Murchison.

The Maruia River rises in the Spenser Mountains, travelling first to the southwest before turning north for the last 50 km of its length. In its upper reaches, the river's valley forms the western approach to the Lewis Pass, the northernmost of the three main mountain passes across the Southern Alps. Hot springs are to be found close to the river in its upper reaches, and the spa of Maruia Springs is located five kilometres to the west of the Lewis Pass, 50 km southeast of Reefton.

3 km east of Springs Junction, the Maruia River flows through the deep and narrow Sluice Box gorge. The river cuts through a band of marble amongst the otherwise predominant greywacke. The Sluice Box, at the junction with the Alfred River, separates the upper and middle section of the Maruia Valley. The area offers a Department of Conservation campsite and is the start of the Lake Daniell Track.

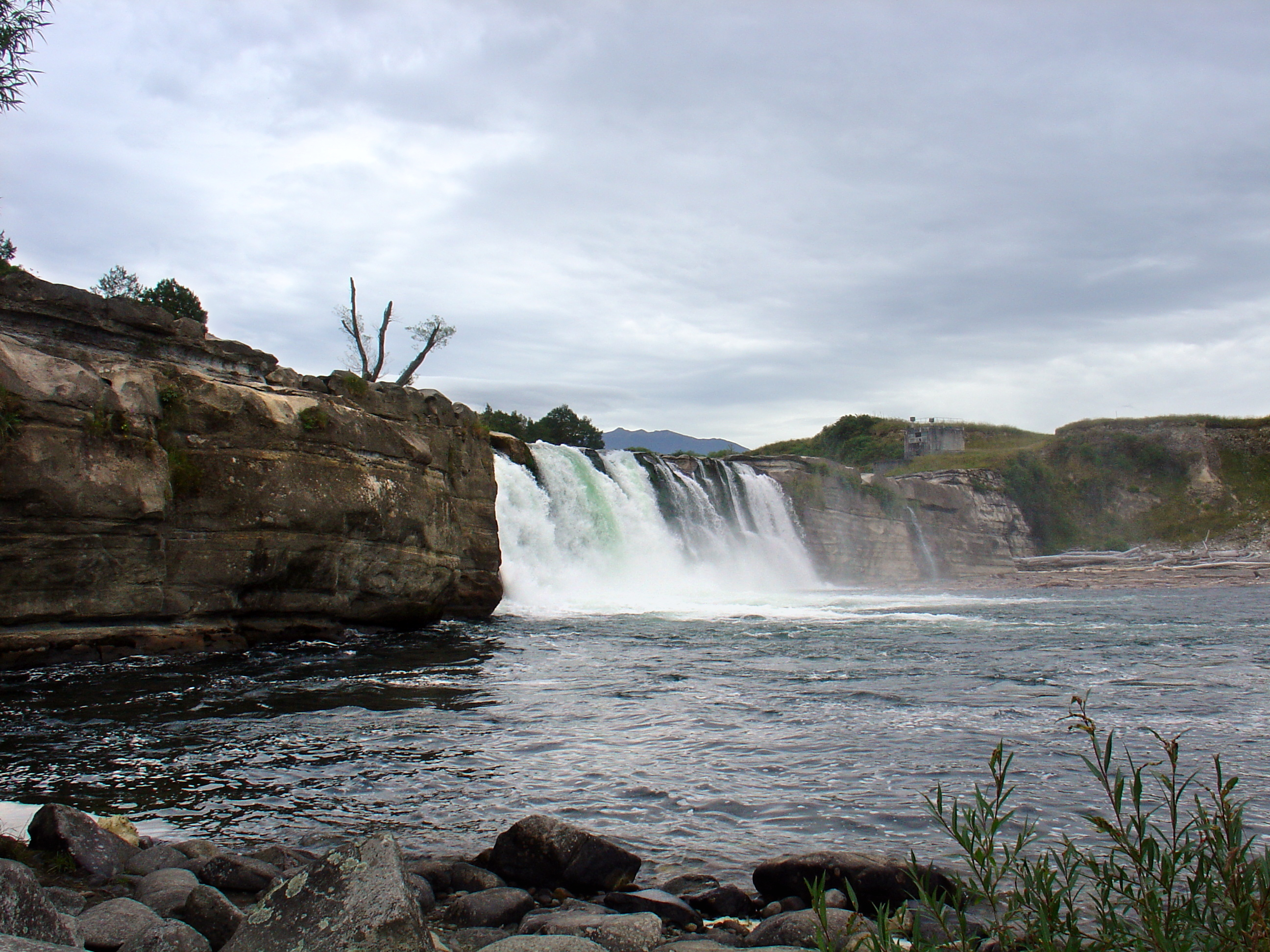
Maruia Falls

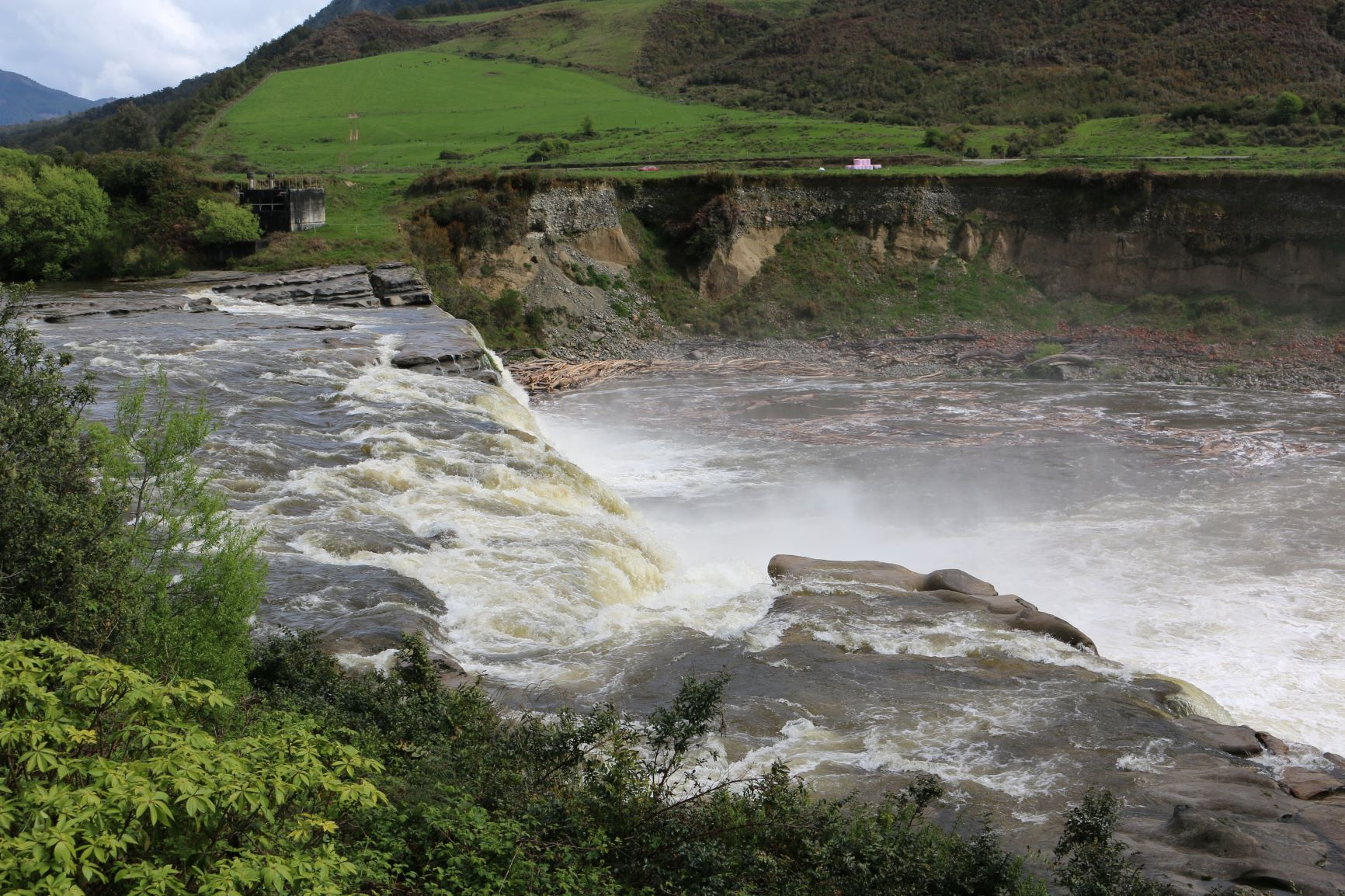
Maruia Falls

Further downstream, 8 kilometres southwest of Murchison, the Maruia Falls were created by the 1929 Murchison earthquake when a slip blocked the original channel.
