= John Davies (New Zealand businessman) =

New Zealand businessman and mayor

Sir John Davies KNZM QSO
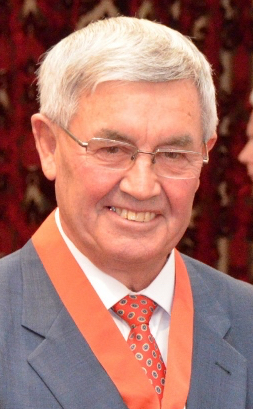
- Davies in 2013

21st Mayor of Queenstown Borough
- In office 1983–1986
- Preceded by: Jim Grant
- Succeeded by: Office abolished

1st Mayor of Queenstown-Lakes
- In office 1986–1989
- Succeeded by: David Bradford

Personal details
- Born: John Stratton Davies; 1 July 1941 (age 84) Wellington, New Zealand
- Spouse: Trish Uren (m. 1965; died 2025)
- Children: 2
- Occupation: Tourism entrepreneur

Sir John Stratton Davies KNZM QSO (born 1 July 1941) is a New Zealand businessman and a former mayor of Queenstown. Through Trojan Holdings Ltd, he is a major owner of South Island tourism companies.

== Early life ==
Davies was born in Wellington but raised in Dunedin. His parents were Ina Amuri (née Robertson) and Donald William Davies. He received his education at John McGlashan College in Dunedin. In 1965, he married Patricia "Trish" Helen Uren, and they went on to have one son and one daughter. From the early 1960s, they lived in Queenstown.

== Political career ==
Davies was a member of the Queenstown Borough Council from 1975 until the borough's abolition in 1986. For the last three years, he was the mayor of Queenstown Borough. After the merger with Lake County to form Queenstown-Lakes District, Davies was the inaugural mayor of Queenstown-Lakes for its first term until 1989.

== Business career ==
From 1958 to 1963, Davies was a high country musterer in Central Otago. In 1963, he purchased Wakatipu Transport Ltd and merged the company in 1967 with Northern Southland Transport Holdings Ltd (NSTH), of which he is the chairman. He was director of Davies Rentals Ltd, which was the local Avis Car Rental franchise for Queenstown. He has invested into the tourism industry since the mid-1980s and credits the people who "voted [him] out of the mayoralty" in the 1989 local elections for concentrating on the tourism industry more seriously.

His first major purchase, in the mid-1980s, was the government's 40% share of Queenstown Airport. After the end of his political career, he purchased the guided walks at the Routeburn and Milford tracks, followed by the Hermitage Hotel, Mount Cook Village. Together with other entrepreneurs, he bought three ski fields off Air New Zealand: Coronet Peak, The Remarkables, and Mount Hutt. The companies are held through Trojan Holdings Ltd, with Davies the sole shareholder of that company. That company holds 40% of the shares of Bungy New Zealand Limited, with A. J. Hackett the public face of it. Trojan Holdings Ltd holds Aoraki/Mount Cook Alpine Village Limited, which in turn owns The Hermitage Hotel. Trojan Holdings Ltd holds NZSki Ltd, which in turn owns the ski fields. Tourism Milford Limited is also held by Trojan Holdings Ltd and trades as Ultimate Hikes. This company operates the guided walks on the Routeburn and Milford tracks. Trojan Holdings Ltd purchased the rights to the annual multisport event Coast to Coast in 2013 from its founder, Robin Judkins.

Davies owns Stratton House in Queenstown, which houses the town's casino marketed as Skycity Queenstown, and the Station building, which houses booking offices for many of the tourism ventures owned by Trojan Holdings Ltd and others.

Davies was chairman of Queenstown Airport and chairman of the Coronet Peak ski field. In 2008, the new base building at Coronet Peak was named "JSD's Lodge at Coronet Peak", using Davies' initials in his honour.

In 2019, National Business Review estimated that Davies had a net worth of NZ$140 million. In 2016, it was reported that Davies had purchased a Bombardier Challenger 300 private jet worth over $20 million.

Davies' wife, Trish, Lady Davies, died in December 2025.

== Honours ==
In the 1995 New Year Honours, Davies was appointed a Companion of the Queen's Service Order for public services. In the 2013 Birthday Honours, he was made a Knight Companion of the New Zealand Order of Merit, for services to business and tourism. Davies was inducted into the New Zealand Business Hall of Fame in August 2019.
