= Trojan Holdings =

Travel and holiday companies of New Zealand

Trojan Holdings is a major privately held New Zealand tourism company, based in Queenstown.

The company is owned by founder Sir John Davies, a former mayor of Queenstown-Lakes and prior to that mayor of Queenstown Borough. As of 2019, Davies has an estimated net worth of $140 million. Both his son Mike, and daughter Jacqui are directors of the company, and part of the management.

== Notable operations ==
- Ultimate Hikes, running guided walks on the Milford Track and Routeburn Track
- Hermitage Hotel, Mount Cook Village
- AJ Hackett Bungy, significant shareholding
- NZSki, running The Remarkables, Coronet Peak and Mt. Hutt ski areas
- Coast to Coast, annual multi-sport competition
- Northern Southland Transport, rural transport operations throughout Southland
- Cromwell Transport, rural transport operations throughout Central Otago
- AllWaste, providing waste collection services throughout Southland and Central Otago
- Southfuels and Northfuels
