= Hotop =

Hotop is a surname. Notable people with the surname include:

- John Hotop (1929–2015), New Zealand rugby union footballer
- Lewis Hotop (c. 1844–1922), New Zealand pharmacist, politician and Arbor Day advocate

== See also ==
- Hotap, a giant in Swiss folklore
- Hotep, an Egyptian word
- title character of the 2002 film Bubba Ho-Tep
