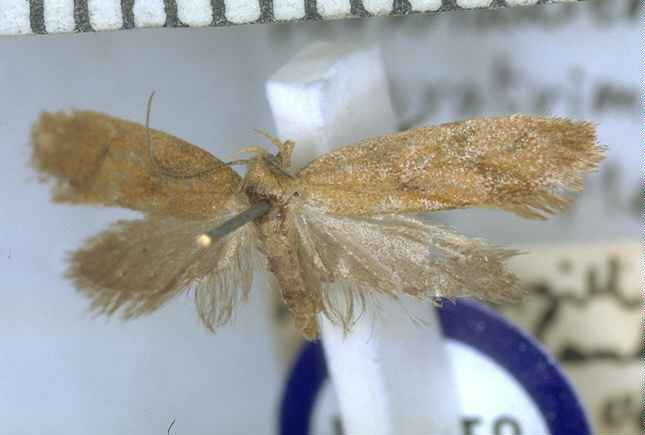
- Male lectotype

Scientific classification
- Kingdom: Animalia
- Phylum: Arthropoda
- Class: Insecta
- Order: Lepidoptera
- Family: Oecophoridae
- Genus: Tingena
- Species: T. paratrimma

Binomial name
- Tingena paratrimma (Meyrick, 1910)

Synonyms
- Borkhausenia paratrimma Meyrick, 1910

= Tingena paratrimma =

Species of moth, endemic to New Zealand

Tingena paratrimma is a species of moth in the family Oecophoridae. It is endemic to New Zealand and has been observed in the lower parts of the South Island. George Hudson regarded this species are uncommon. The adults of this species are on the wing from November to February.

== Taxonomy ==
This species was first described in 1910 by Edward Meyrick using two specimens collected by Alfred Philpott in Invercargill in December. Meyrick originally named this species Borkhausenia paratrimma. In 1911 Meyrick redescribed this species. In 1917 Alfred Philpott discussed the species. George Hudson discussed and illustrated this species in his 1928 book The butterflies and moths of New Zealand also under the same name. In 1988 J. S. Dugdale placed this species in the genus Tingena. The male lectotype specimen, collected at Invercargill, is held in the Natural History Museum, London.

== Description ==
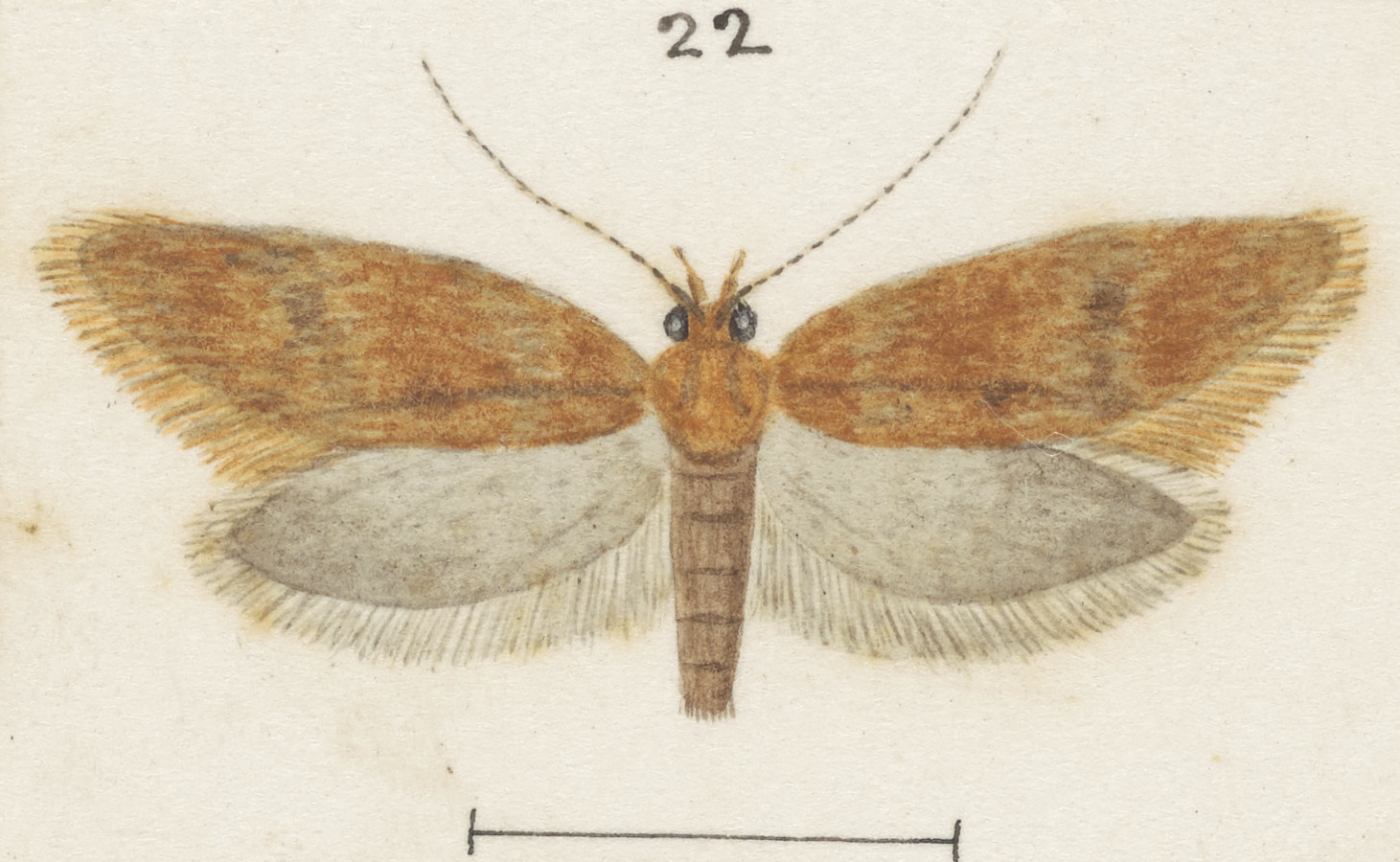
Illustration of T. paratrimma by George Hudson.

Meyrick described this species as follows:

♂. 15 mm. Head and thorax ferruginous-ochreous. Palpi ochreous irrorated with dark fuscous. Antennæ dark grey. Abdomen grey. Forewings elongate, rather narrow, costa moderately arched, apex round-pointed, termen very obliquely rounded; ferruginous-ochreous; very indistinct oblique fasciæ of fuscous irroration before and beyond middle; some slight fuscous irroration towards apex: cilia ferruginous-ochreous. Hindwings and cilia grey.

Meyrick redescribed this species in 1911 as follows:

♂. 14-15 mm. Head and thorax ochreous-fulvous. Palpi and antennae dark grey, antennal ciliations 1. Abdomen grey. Forewings elongate, rather narrow, costa gently arched, apex round-pointed, termen very obliquely rounded; ochreous-fulvous, somewhat sprinkled with grey, towards all margins suffused with grey irroration; two oblique fasciae of grey irroration crossing plical and second discal stigmata, which are marked on them as indistinct cloudy darker dots : cilia ochreous-fulvous irrorated with grey. Hindwings and cilia grey.

This species is similar in appearance to T. sigerodeta but differs in that T. paratrimma has broader wings, grey coloured hindwings and lacks the dark fuscous irroration on the forewings that can be found on specimens of T. siderodeta.

== Distribution ==
This species is endemic to New Zealand. It has been observed in the southern parts of the South Island, including at Invercargill, Dunedin and at Coronet Peak. Hudson regarded this species as rare.

== Behaviour ==
Adults of this species are on the wing from November to February.
