= Mount Cook Group Ltd v Johnstone Motors Ltd =

- Court: High Court of New Zealand
- Full case name: Mount Cook Group Ltd v Johnstone Motors Ltd
- Citation: [1990] 2 NZLR 488
- Transcript: High Court judgment

Court membership
- Judge sitting: Tipping J

Keywords
- negligence

Mount Cook Group Ltd v Johnstone Motors Ltd [1990] 2 NZLR 488 is a cited case in New Zealand regarding claims in defamation and the issue of identification of the plaintiff and defamatory meaning.

== Background ==
Johnstone Motors purchased a sport shop in Queenstown. Amongst the stock that was included in the sale were hundreds of posters depicting a groom with his hand under his bride's wedding dress, with the quote "Please darling – No children yet, fun first, let's ski Coronet Peak – Queenstown".

Mount Cook Group, which owned the Coronet Peak ski field for over 40 years, were facing a consumer boycott of its airline on the basis that Mount Cook was behind this sexist poster.

MCG initially made several attempts at requesting that Johnstone Motors stop selling these posters, but the reply was that MCG could purchase all the offending posters they wanted.

MCG sued them for $15,000 in damages, as well as filing for an injunction preventing further sales.

== Held ==
The Court awarded $1,000 in damages. The injunction was also granted.
