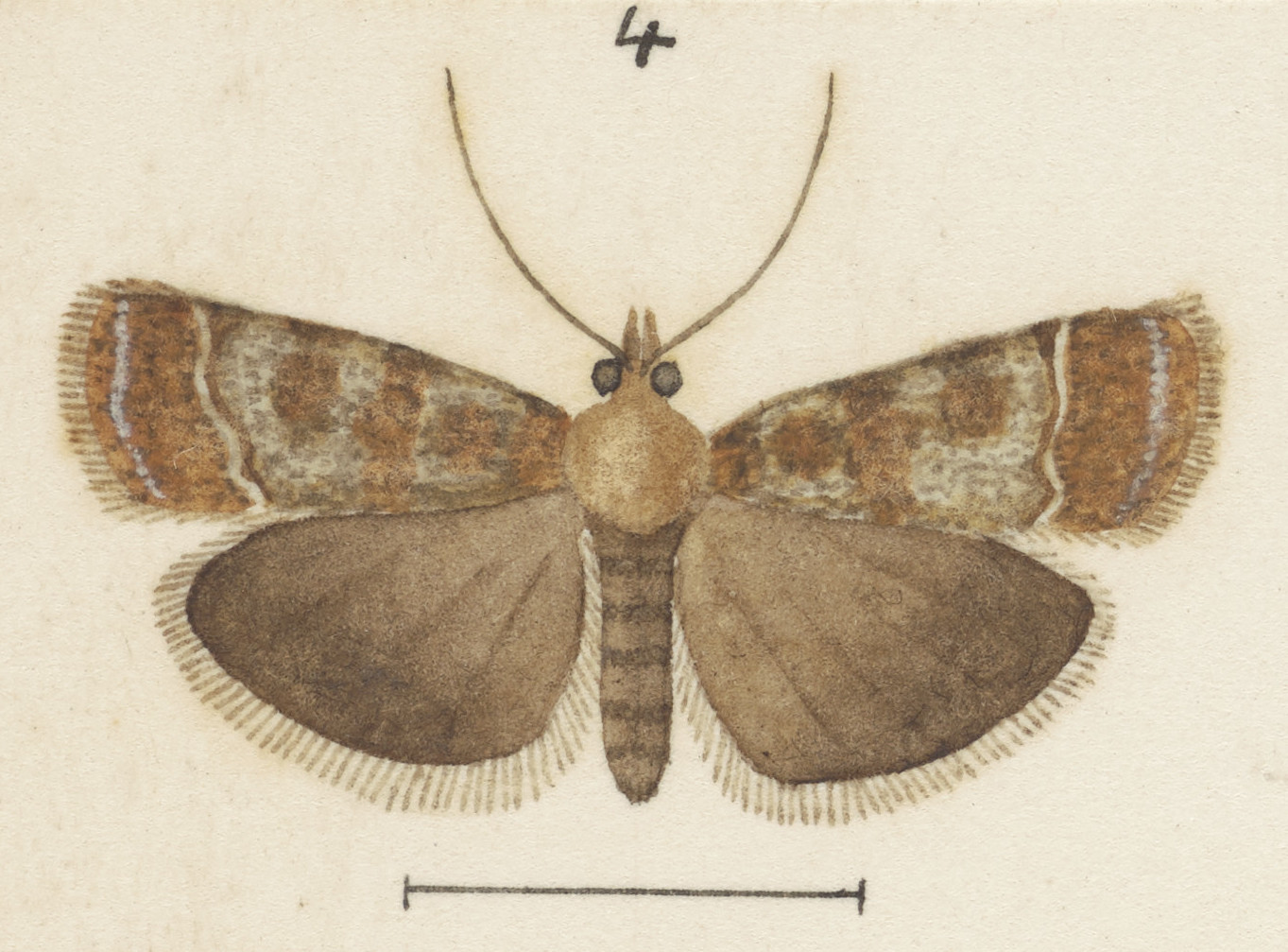

Scientific classification
- Kingdom: Animalia
- Phylum: Arthropoda
- Class: Insecta
- Order: Lepidoptera
- Family: Crambidae
- Genus: Eudonia
- Species: E. epicremna

Binomial name
- Eudonia epicremna (Meyrick, 1884)

Synonyms
- Xeroscopa epicremna Meyrick, 1884; Scoparia epicremna (Meyrick, 1884)

= Eudonia epicremna =

Species of moth

Eudonia epicremna is a moth in the family Crambidae. It was named by Edward Meyrick in 1884. This species is endemic to New Zealand.

The wingspan is 14–15 mm. The forewings are fuscous, mixed with yellow-ochreous. The median third is mixed with white and there is a small white basal spot, as well as a white spot on the costa near the base. The hindwings are fuscous-grey, the hindmargin suffused with dark fuscous. Adults have been recorded on wing in January.

Adults of this species have been found on the slopes below the Coronet Peak ski field and larvae are present there on seepage mosses.
