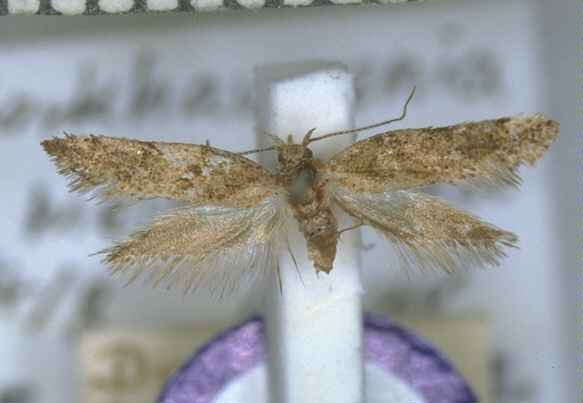
- Male lectotype

Scientific classification
- Kingdom: Animalia
- Phylum: Arthropoda
- Class: Insecta
- Order: Lepidoptera
- Family: Oecophoridae
- Genus: Tingena
- Species: T. melanamma

Binomial name
- Tingena melanamma (Meyrick, 1905)

Synonyms
- Borkhausenia melanamma Meyrick, 1905; Borkhausenia sabulosa Philpott, 1918

= Tingena melanamma =

Species of moth, endemic to New Zealand

Tingena melanamma is a species of moth in the family Oecophoridae. It is endemic to New Zealand and has been observed in Marlborough, Otago and Southland.

== Taxonomy ==
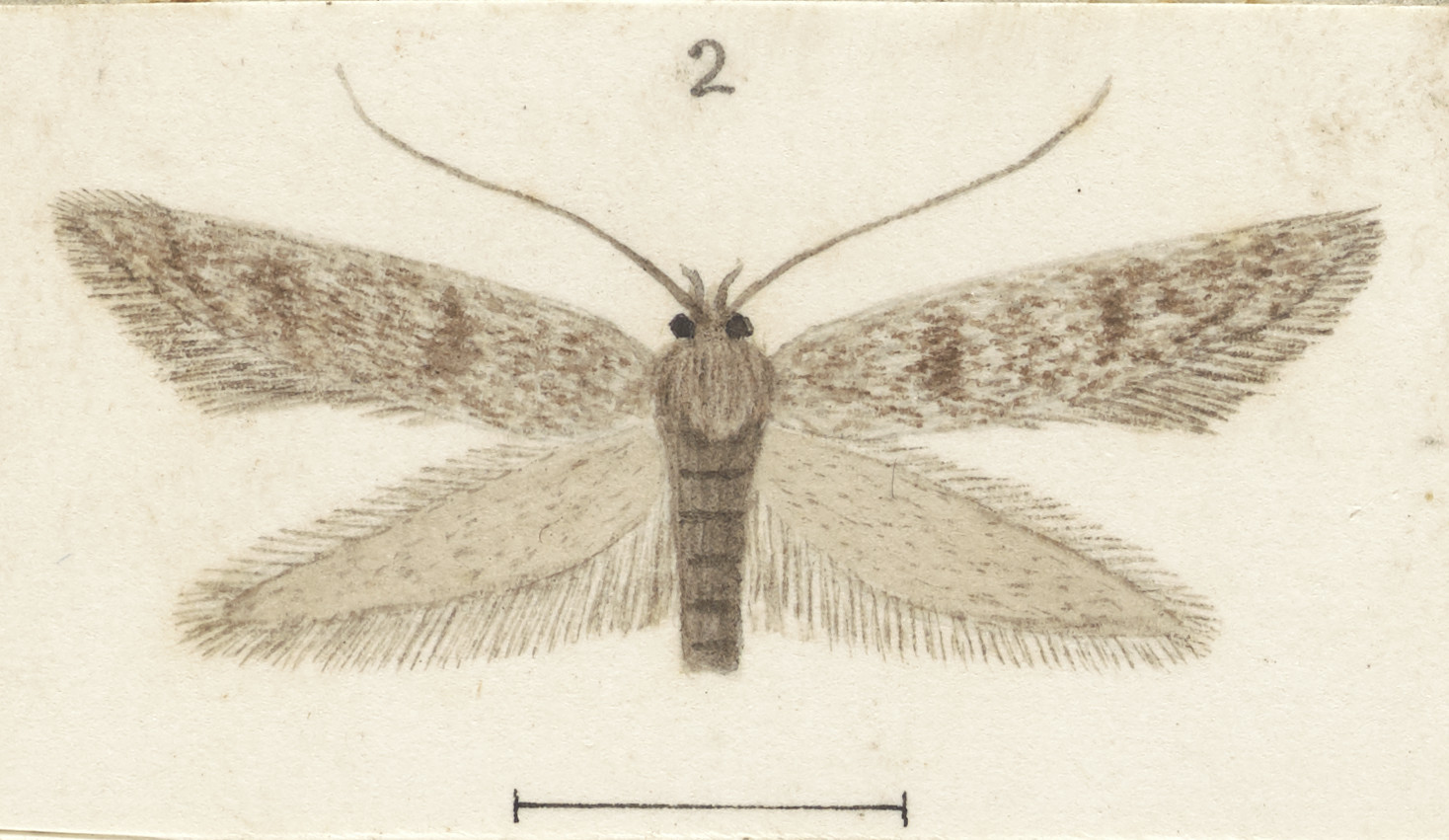
Illustration of T. melanamma by George Hudson.

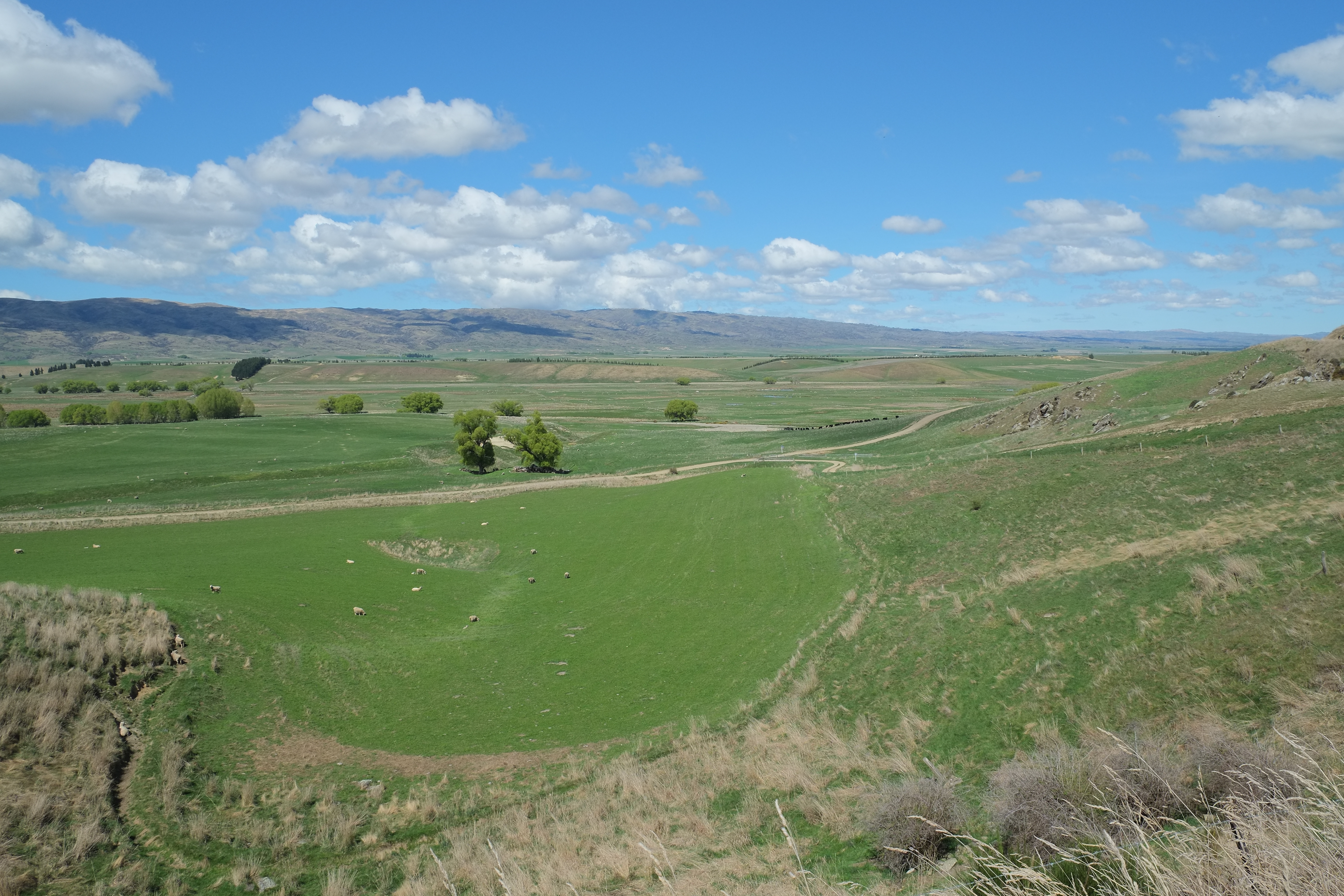
Ida Valley, type locality of T. melanamma

This species was first described by Edward Meyrick in 1905 using specimens collected by J. H. Lewis in Ida Valley, Otago and named Borkhausenia melanamma. In 1915 Meyrick discussed this species under the name Borkhausenia melanamma. In 1926 Alfred Philpott discussed and illustrated the genitalia of the male of this species however the genitalia of the lectotype of this species differs from Philpott's illustration. In 1928 George Hudson also discussed and illustrated this species in his book The butterflies and moths of New Zealand. In 1988 J. S. Dugdale placed this species within the genus Tingena. In the same publication Dugdale synonymised Borkhausenia sabulosa with T. melanamma as the holotype of B. sabulosa and the lectotype of T. melanamma are indistinguishable. The male lectotype is held at the Natural History Museum, London.

== Description ==
Meyrick described this species as follows:

♂. 12-14 mm. Head, palpi, and thorax grey irrorated with white. Antennae, dark grey ringed with whitish, ciliations 1. Abdomen grey, more or less mixed with ochreous-yellowish. Fore-wings lanceolate, costa bent at 1/3; fuscous, irrorated with white, with a few scattered dark fuscous scales; four oblique fasciae of dark fuscous irroration from costa at base, 1/3, 2/5, and 5/6 indicated or obsolete : cilia light fuscous, some irroration and tips whitish. Hind-wings grey; cilia light grey, with darker basal shade.

This species is very similar in appearance to T. siderodita but has a grey appearance and lacks the ochreous-yellow colouring and the paler hindwings of the latter species.

== Distribution ==
This species is endemic to New Zealand, having been observed in Otago and Southland. This species has also been observed in coastal habitats in Marlborough.

== Behaviour ==
Adults of this species are on the wing in December and January. The larvae of this species feed on leaf litter.
