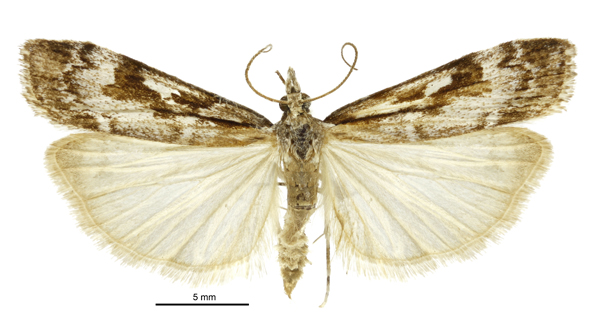
- Male

Scientific classification
- Kingdom: Animalia
- Phylum: Arthropoda
- Clade: Pancrustacea
- Class: Insecta
- Order: Lepidoptera
- Family: Crambidae
- Genus: Scoparia
- Species: S. cyameuta

Binomial name
- Scoparia cyameuta (Meyrick, 1884)

Synonyms
- Xeroscopa cyameuta Meyrick, 1884

= Scoparia cyameuta =

Species of moth

Scoparia cyameuta is a moth of the family Crambidae. It was named by Edward Meyrick in 1884. Meyrick gave a description of the species in 1885. S. cyameuta is endemic to New Zealand.

== Taxonomy ==
This species was first named by Edward Meyrick in 1884 and originally named Xeroscopa cyameuta. Meyrick gave a fuller description of the species in 1885. In 1913 Meyrick placed this species in the genus Scoparia. In 1928 George Hudson discussed and illustrated this species in his book, The butterflies and moths of New Zealand. The male lectotype specimen, collected at Mount Hutt, is held at the Natural History Museum, London.

== Description ==
The wingspan is 25–28 mm. The forewings are fuscous, irrorated with white. There is a black median streak from the base of the costa to the first line. This first line is white, margined by black on the upper half posteriorly. The second line is white, dark-margined anteriorly. The hindwings are pale whitish-ochreous. The apex and upper part of the hindmargin are narrowly grey. Adults have been recorded on wing from December to February.
