= Hermitage Hotel, Mount Cook Village =

Hotel in Mount Cook Village, New Zealand

Hermitage Hotel
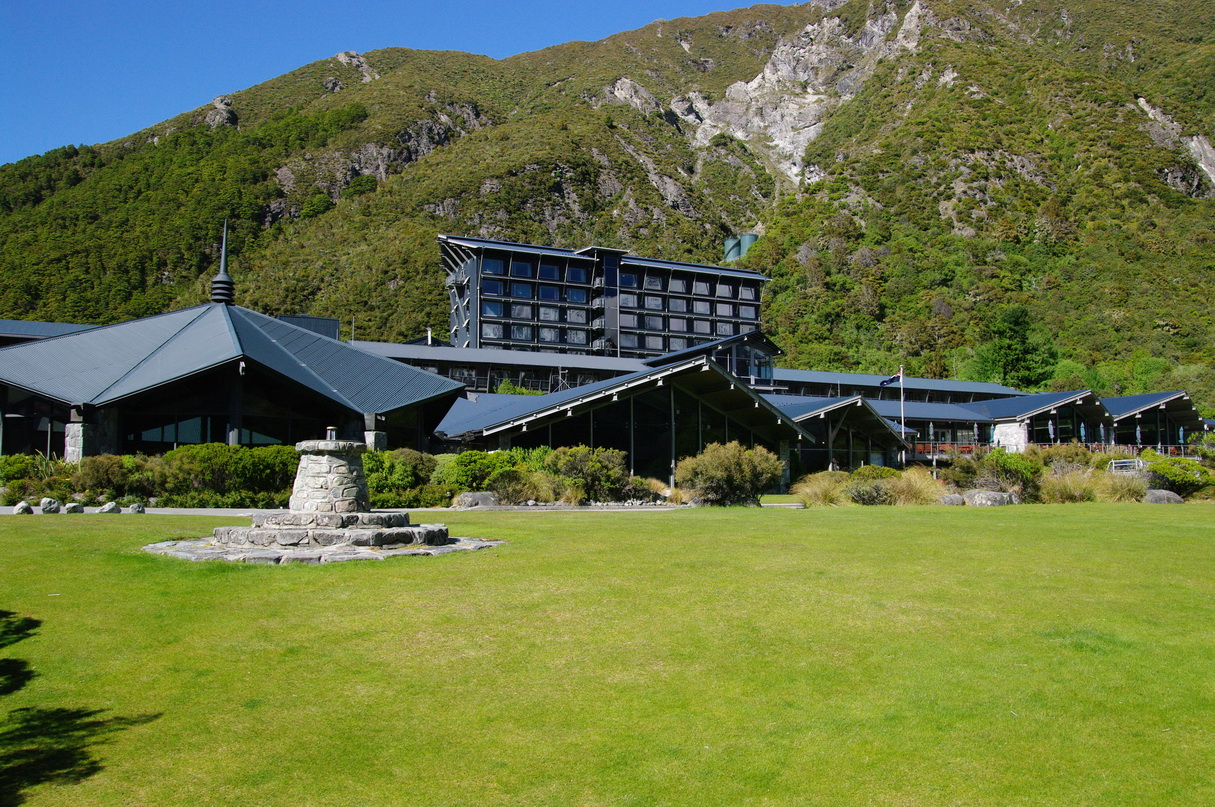
- Hotel complex, with the restaurants in the foreground and the main hotel building behind

- Location within New Zealand

General information
- Location: Aoraki / Mount Cook National Park, 89 Terrace Road, Aoraki Mount Cook Alpine Village, Canterbury 7999, New Zealand
- Coordinates: 43.73308°S 170.09357°E
- Opening: First hotel: 1884 Current hotel: 1958
- Owner: Trojan Holdings

Technical details
- Floor count: 10

Design and construction
- Architects: Hall and MacKenzie

Other information
- Number of rooms: 164
- Number of suites: 20 chalets, plus a lodge & motel complex

Website
- www.hermitage.co.nz

The Hermitage Hotel in Mount Cook Village, New Zealand, is a hotel located inside the Aoraki / Mount Cook National Park, 65 kilometres (40 mi) north of Twizel. The current building dates from 1958 and forms the main part of Mount Cook Village, being the only large building. Along with a nearby lodge and motels, the hotel trades as Aoraki Mt Cook Alpine Village and is owned by Trojan Holdings.

== Description ==
The hotel, along with a lodge and motel complex also owned and operated by the Hermitage, forms the main part of Mount Cook Village, with the hotel being the only large building in the area. The current site, slightly elevated on the side of the valley, was chosen in 1913 for its unimpeded views of Aoraki / Mount Cook and Mount Sefton.

Most rooms in the main hotel building facing north have views of Aoraki / Mount Cook, as do the two restaurants through their large glass windows. The peak of Aoraki / Mount Cook is only 15 kilometres (9.3 mi) away, further up the Hooker Valley. Below the nearby Mount Sefton is Huddleston Glacier, named after the original hotel developer Frank Huddleston, a surveyor and painter from Timaru, who was appointed ranger for the Mount Cook area in the 1880s.

The Hermitage Hotel houses the Sir Edmund Hillary Alpine Centre, showcasing the region and its history. The Alpine Centre includes a cinema showing related documentary films, a museum, and a planetarium.

Organised tours on the nearby walking tracks, bus tours, and boat tours on the Tasman glacier lake use the hotel as their base, with tours leaving and returning at the main building's foyer and car park.

The village's only retail shop is also contained within the main hotel building, comparable to a very small dairy (convenience store) in its range of groceries. The nearest supermarket is 65 kilometres (40 mi) away in Twizel.

== History ==
The current hotel is the third building in the area named "The Hermitage".

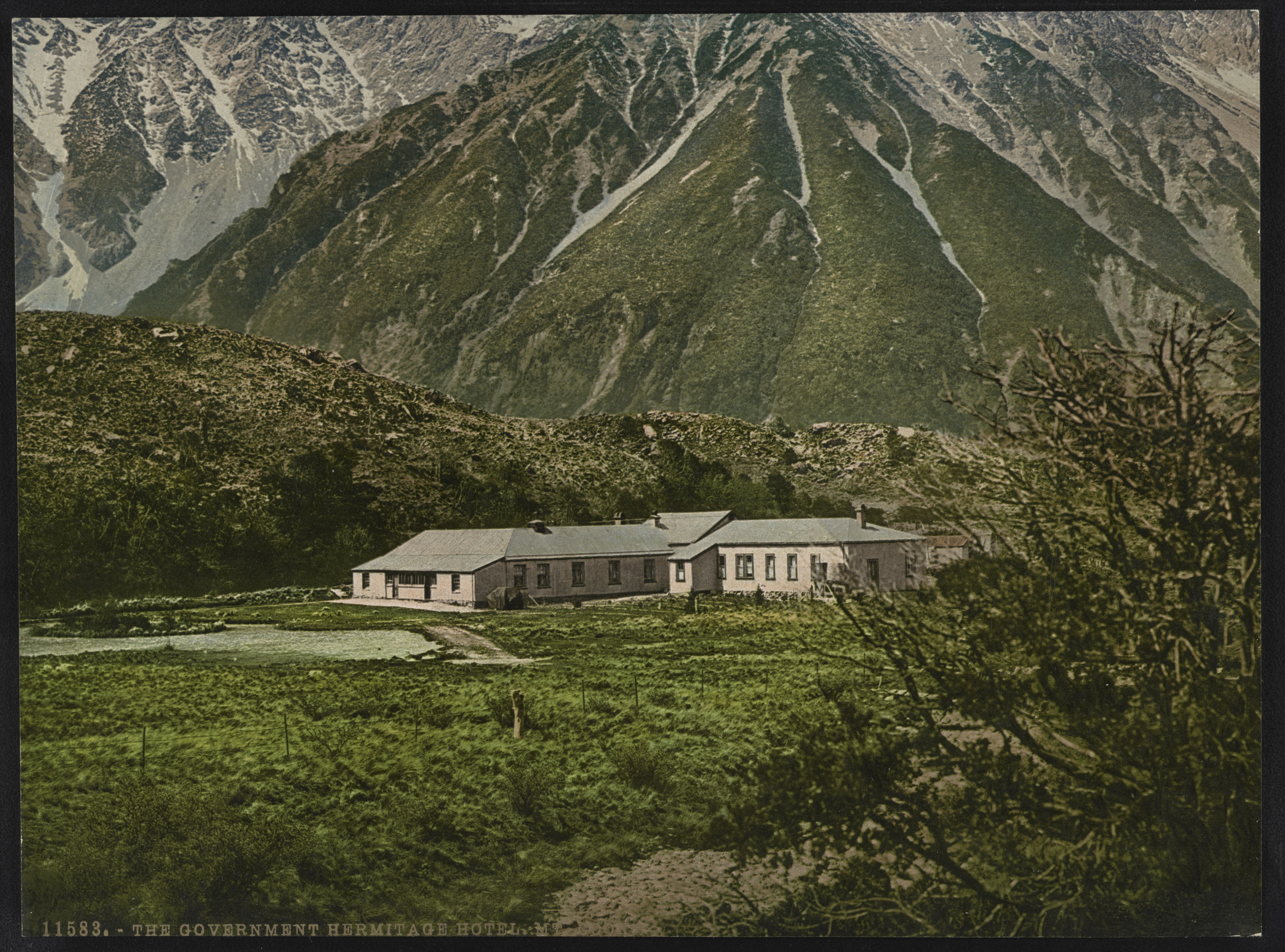
The first Hermitage Hotel, in 1890

=== 1884–1913 ===
The first Hermitage, built in 1884–1885, was a cob building with 11 guest rooms built by Frank Huddleston, on his land in a location slightly further up the valley towards Mueller Glacier. Access to the hotel was via horseback on a rough track, and this and the variable weather limited the number of guests at the hotel. In 1888, a better track was constructed between Pukaki and the Hermitage, which allowed access by horse-drawn coaches. Huddleston later sold the hotel but stayed on as manager until 1896. In 1896 the New Zealand Government bought the hotel buildings, contents and 29 acres of land for £900. By this time the hotel had been extended and contained about 30 rooms. Visitors could hire horses or hire a guide to take them climbing. In 1901 management of the hotel passed to the Department of Tourist and Health Resorts. Travel to the Hermitage by motor car first occurred in February 1906, and a bus service began in November that year.

Work began on a new hotel at a new site in 1912. In January 1913 a flood damaged the original hotel, and in March 1913 a second flood caused major damage, knocking the building over. A plaque commemorates the site of the first Hermitage.

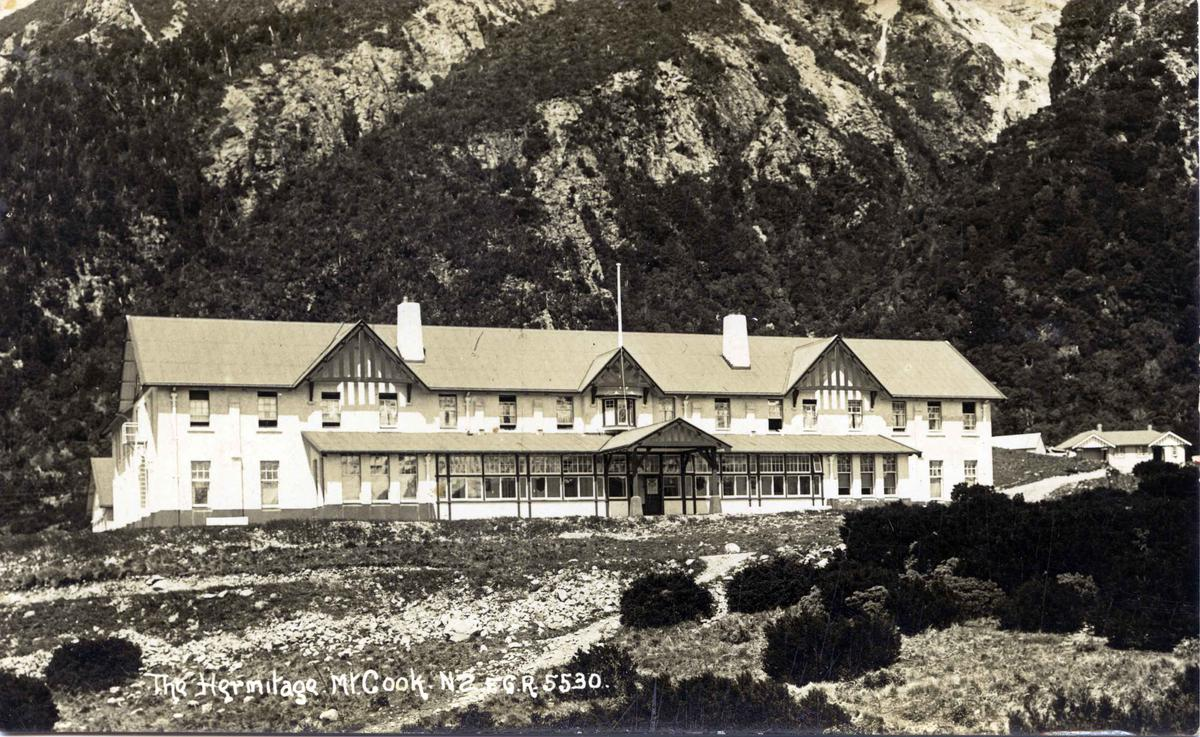
The second Hermitage Hotel, in 1917.

=== 1914–1957 ===
A larger hotel, again called the Hermitage, was built and opened at the current site in 1914 to cater to increased demand. Initially, the hotel was not profitable. During the 1920–21 financial year almost 1000 people visited the Hermitage, with over a third of these being tourists from other countries, particularly Australia and the United States. However, in the same year the Hermitage made a loss of £1414, not including depreciation or interest on capital expenditure. This was due mainly to the hotel's isolation, which meant that fuel and freight costs were expensive and it was difficult to retain staff. In 1922, the government granted the lease for the hotel to a private operator, the Mount Cook Motor Company, who vowed to lower the hotel tariff and make the hotel more popular. The Mount Cook Motor Company already offered a tourist bus service to the Hermitage, and was now able to provide what were some of the first package tours in New Zealand. The hotel flourished and was extended.

In 1942 the lease reverted to the Government Tourist Department, and in 1956 the government's newly established Tourist Hotel Corporation took over running the hotel. The hotel was refurbished and extended. On the ground floor there was a large lounge, lounge bar, recreation room, dining room, and kitchen, and the first floor had bedrooms for 62 guests. However, on 15 September 1957 a fire started in the hotel kitchen and completely destroyed the newly renovated building.

=== 1958–present ===
The government quickly built a new hotel, which opened only eight months later in May 1958. The building was designed by Christchurch architects Hall and MacKenzie, who were awarded a gold medal from the Institute of Architects for the design. The new hotel complex consisted of accommodation with private bathrooms for 60 guests, plus separate blocks for staff housing and a cottage for a park ranger. At the front of the hotel was a distinctive octagonal restaurant, the 'Panorama Room'. A new wing was added in 1961, providing an extra 42 beds, and in 1977 another multi-storey wing was added. In addition, Glencoe Lodge (now Mt Cook Lodge) was opened in 1967 and later expanded. Motels and chalets were also built, all under the management of the Tourist Hotel Corporation.

The government sold the Tourist Hotel Corporation to South Pacific Hotels Corporation in 1990. Not long after, Trojan Holdings, a New Zealand tourism company founded and owned by a local family, purchased the Hermitage Hotel from them. Trojan added a new 60-room accommodation block to the Hermitage in 2001.

Owing to the COVID-19 pandemic, it was announced in May 2020 that the Hermitage would close indefinitely with the loss of 157 jobs. The smaller Mt Cook Lodge was set to reopen from 24 September 2020, coinciding with the school holidays between terms 3 and 4, but the full hotel reopened instead in July 2020. By September, staff numbers were back up to about 70 and 130 rooms were open. Along with NZ Ski, also owned by Trojan Holdings, The Hermitage declined funds from the strategic tourism assets protection programme (Stapp).

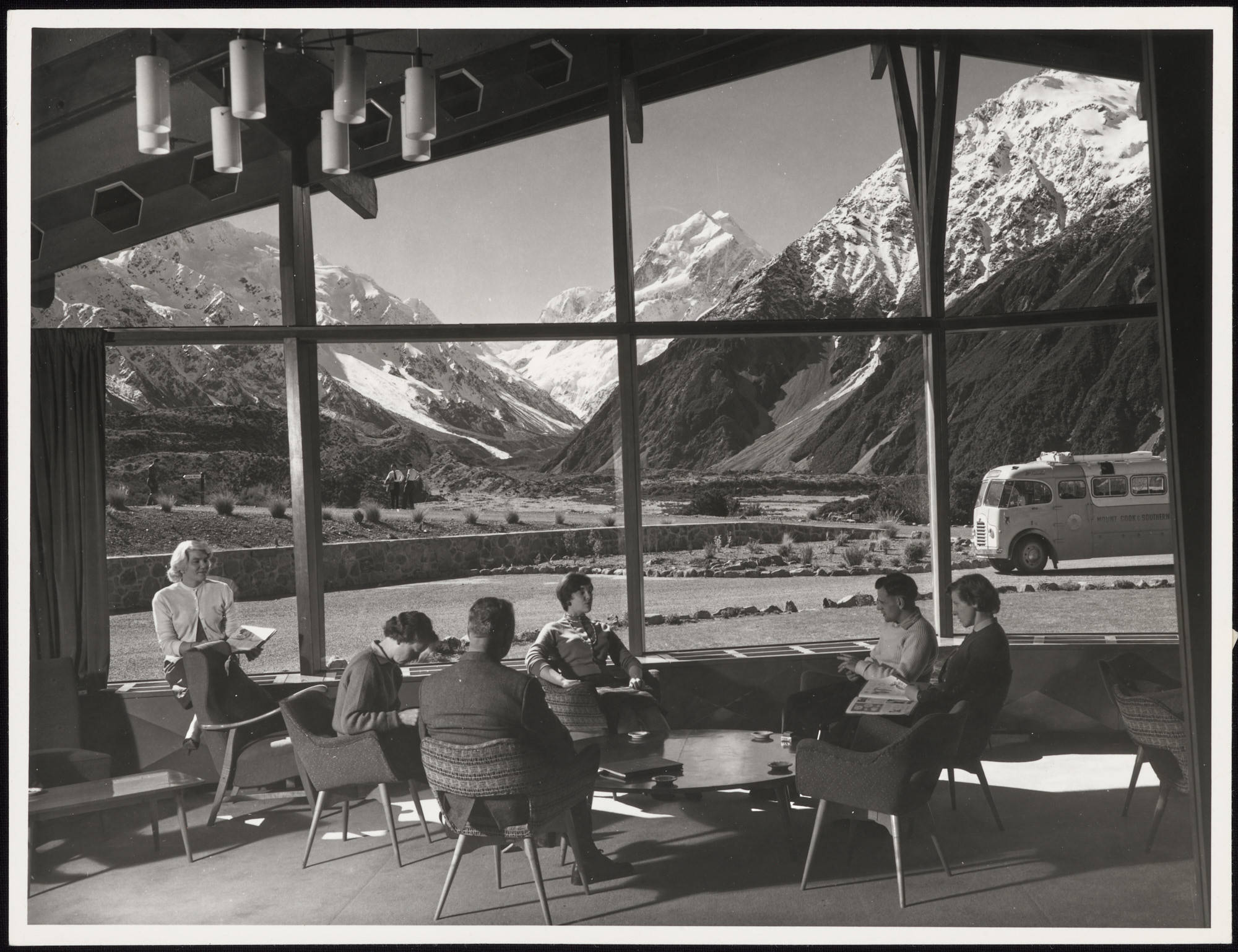
View of Mount Cook from the lounge of the third Hermitage, 1960s

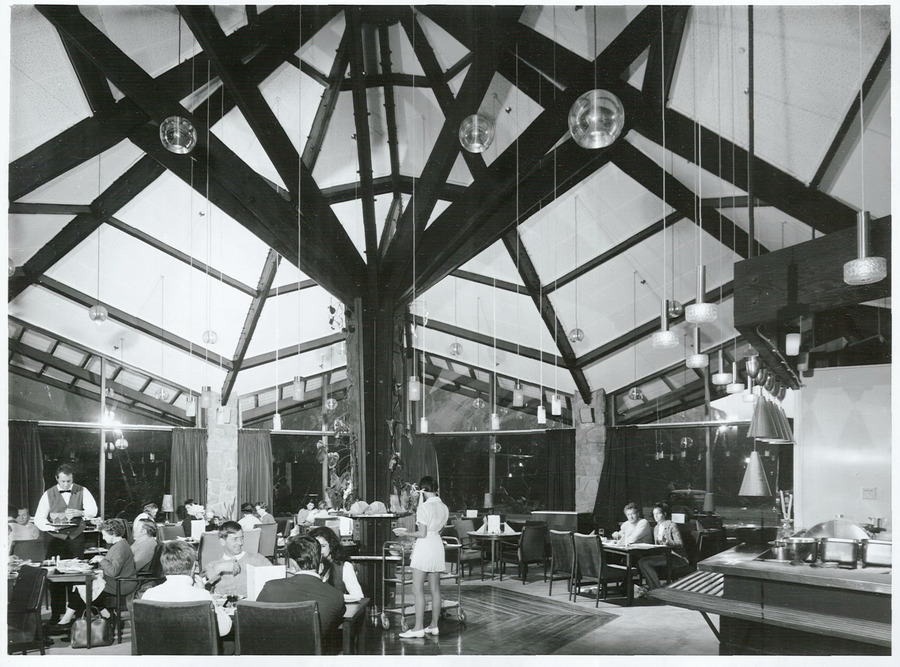
Panorama Room restaurant, 1977

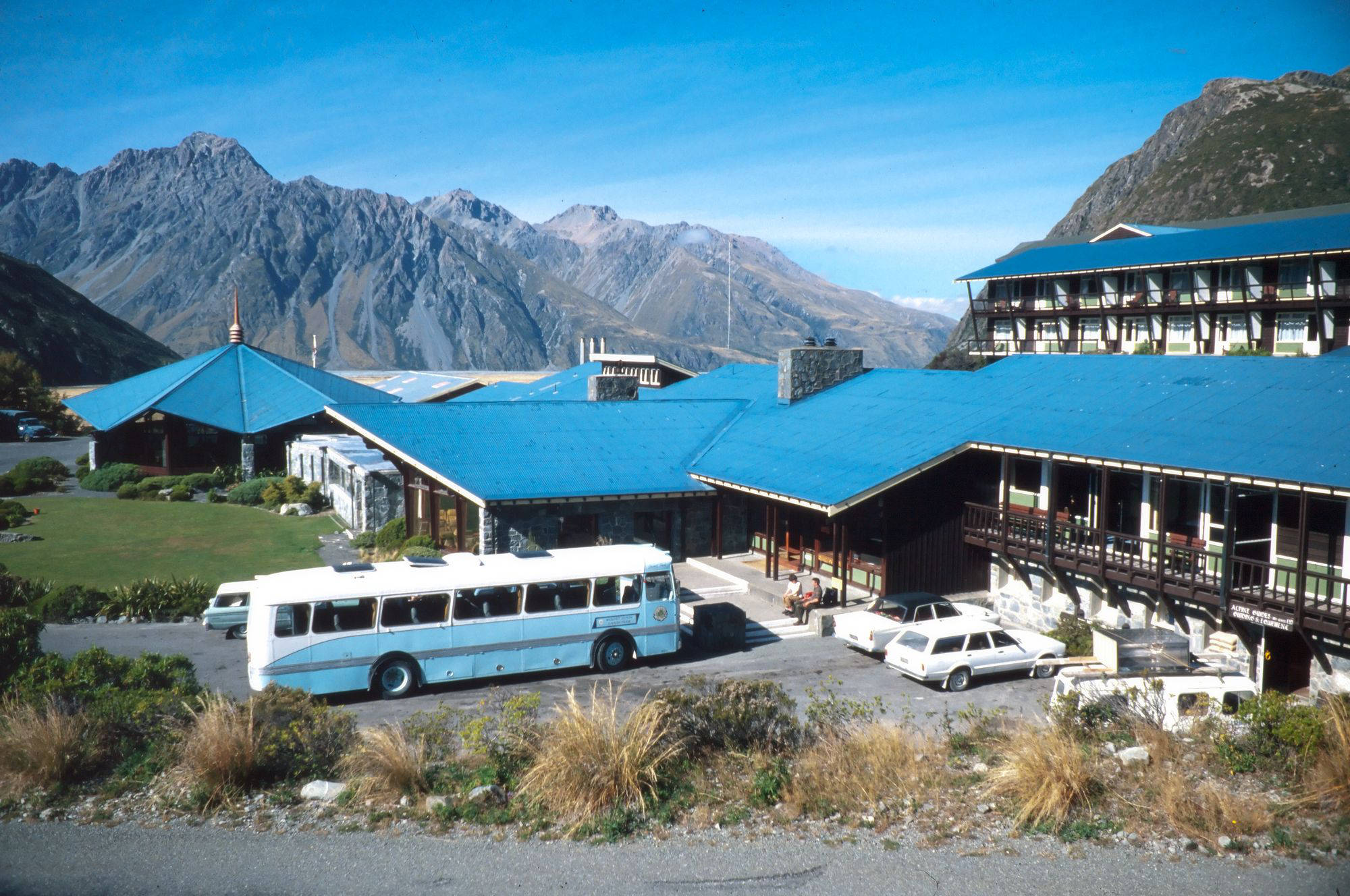
Hermitage Hotel, 1980s, Panorama Room at left

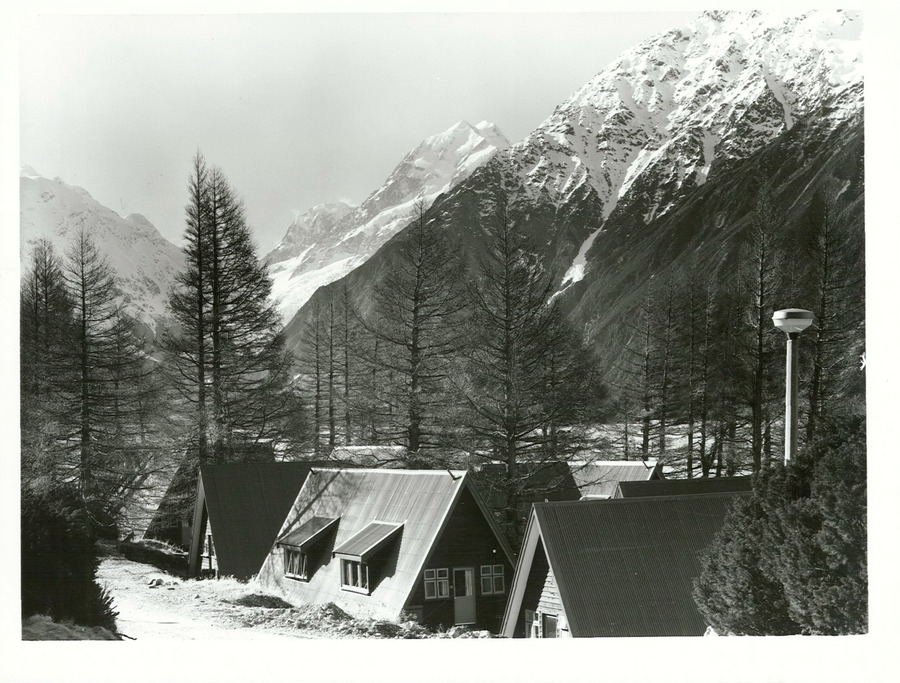
A-frame chalets, 1977

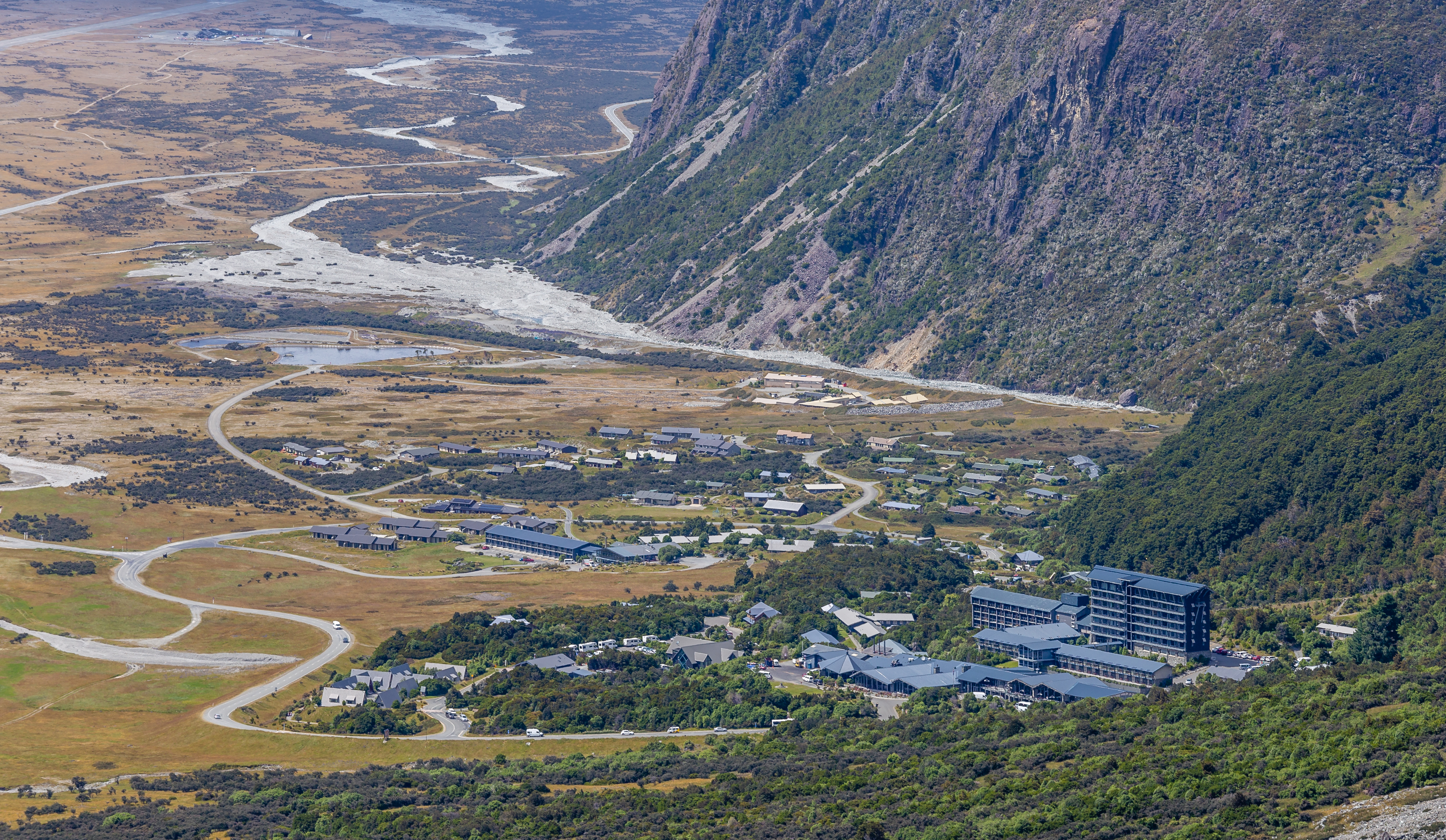
Hermitage Hotel complex (bottom right) and Mt Cook Village
