= James William Robertson =

New Zealand politician (1826–1876)

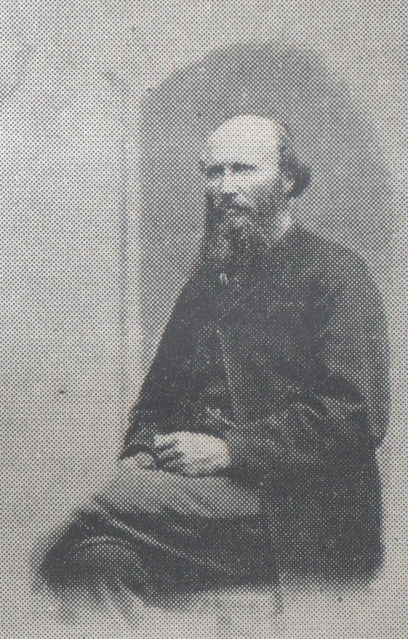
Robertson in 1866

James William Robertson (1826 – 23 January 1876) was the first mayor of Queenstown, New Zealand.

He was born in Saint John, New Brunswick, British North America. His father owned a sawmill and he worked in the lumber trade. He was drawn to the gold rush in Ballarat, Victoria, Australia. He set up with others and they spent three years using a water race, flume, galvanised piping and other methods. Eventually, Robertson and some others travelled to the Shotover near Queenstown and saw the gold mining opportunities there. He set up a company with Dan and Frank McBride and Thos Hicks. They were timber millers at Kinloch, ship builders (including the Antrim), they built wharves at Queenstown, Frankton and Kingston. They owned land including large areas of the Frankton Flat. Bendix Hallenstein was a close business partner, and would become the second mayor of Queenstown.

Robertson was elected mayor of Queenstown three times, and was elected as a representative of the Lakes District in the Otago Provincial Council but sat for only one session.

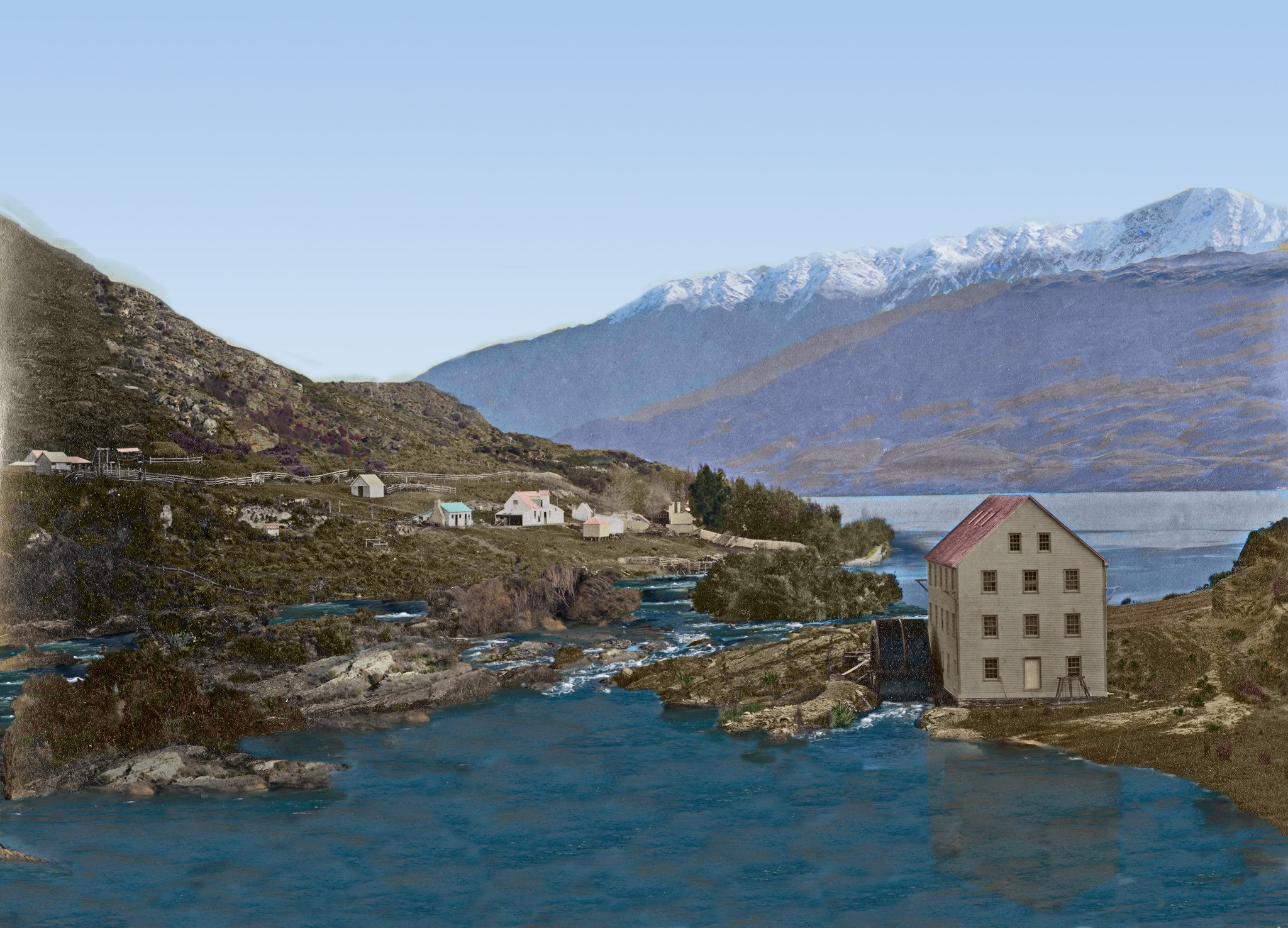
This colourised photo shows the Brunswick Flour Mill opened in 1867. Across the Kawarau River can be seen the homestead founded by Queenstown Pioneer William Rees.

Robertson and Co. operated a sawmill at the 'Head of the Lake' (Glenorchy) near Queenstown and the company had a lumber yard in Beach Street, Queenstown. In 1865 he applied to establish a flour mill near Kawarau Falls with Bendix Hallenstein. They met government opposition with approval of the mill, the chief objection was that it would interfere with water rights. It became the topic of discussion at the Queenstown Improvement Committee meeting in September 1865. In May 1865 it was Robertson and Hallenstein who the Town Committee turned to, to plan the building of a new schoolhouse.

In July 1866 a public meeting of electors was held in the Queen's Arms Hotel for the purpose of nominating and hearing candidates for the office of Mayor. Robertson won the nomination receiving 14 votes, Bendix Hallenstein received 13 votes and Dennis G Macdonnell received 9 votes. Robertson contested the election with a Mr W. Fuller of the Scandinavian Company, a new arrival. Queenstown's first mayoral election took place on Saturday 21 July 1866 with polling booths at Eichardt's Queen's Arms Hotel, and M'Larn's Prince of Wales Hotel. Two bank officials oversaw the polling, and rate-payers were allowed to vote. At half-past four o'clock the returning officer, R. Beetham, Esq., gave the results; Robertson-40, Fuller-29, and he pronounced Mr Robertson the first duly elected Mayor of Queenstown.

He was the mayor of Queenstown Borough from 1866 to 1869. The flour mill was eventually opened in July 1867. Mrs Robertson cracked a bottle of champagne at the opening ceremony. It was named the Brunswick Flour Mill as Robertson was from Brunswick (in modern-day Canada) and Hallenstein was from Brunswick (in modern-day Germany). On 19 February 1868 his wife gave birth to a son at Queenstown.

He died in 1876. Robertson Street in Frankton may have been named after him, although the mill was managed by another James Robertson, whose house was on the flat to the south of the Kawarau Falls.

A turbine at the mill supplied electricity to the mill until 1926 when the Kawarau Falls dam was built. The turbine was later erected as a memorial near the end of Bridge Street, but in 2017 was moved to allow construction of the new two lane Kawarau Falls Bridge.

He was affectionately known as 'Daddy Robertson', and his bulldog was named 'Chummy'.
