= William Warren (journalist) =

English-born New Zealand journalist and politician

William Warren (1833 – 3 January 1900) was the fifth mayor of Queenstown Borough in New Zealand.

He was born in Royston, England. His father John was also a journalist. William followed the gold rush to Victoria and then Otago. In 1864 he acquired, initially in partnership with R.Wills; the Wakatip Mail and became sole owner in May 1867. William Warren was a borough councillor for many years and served two terms as mayor of Queenstown; 1877–1878 and 1881–1882. He also formed a Cadet Corps in the Volunteer movement, and was the Captain.

He was prominent in the Freemasons, joining the Masonic Lake Lodge of Ophir in 1868, and held several offices in a long membership. He also took a prominent part in the Anglican Church.

In 1873 he married Margaret Jane Beggs and they had four children.

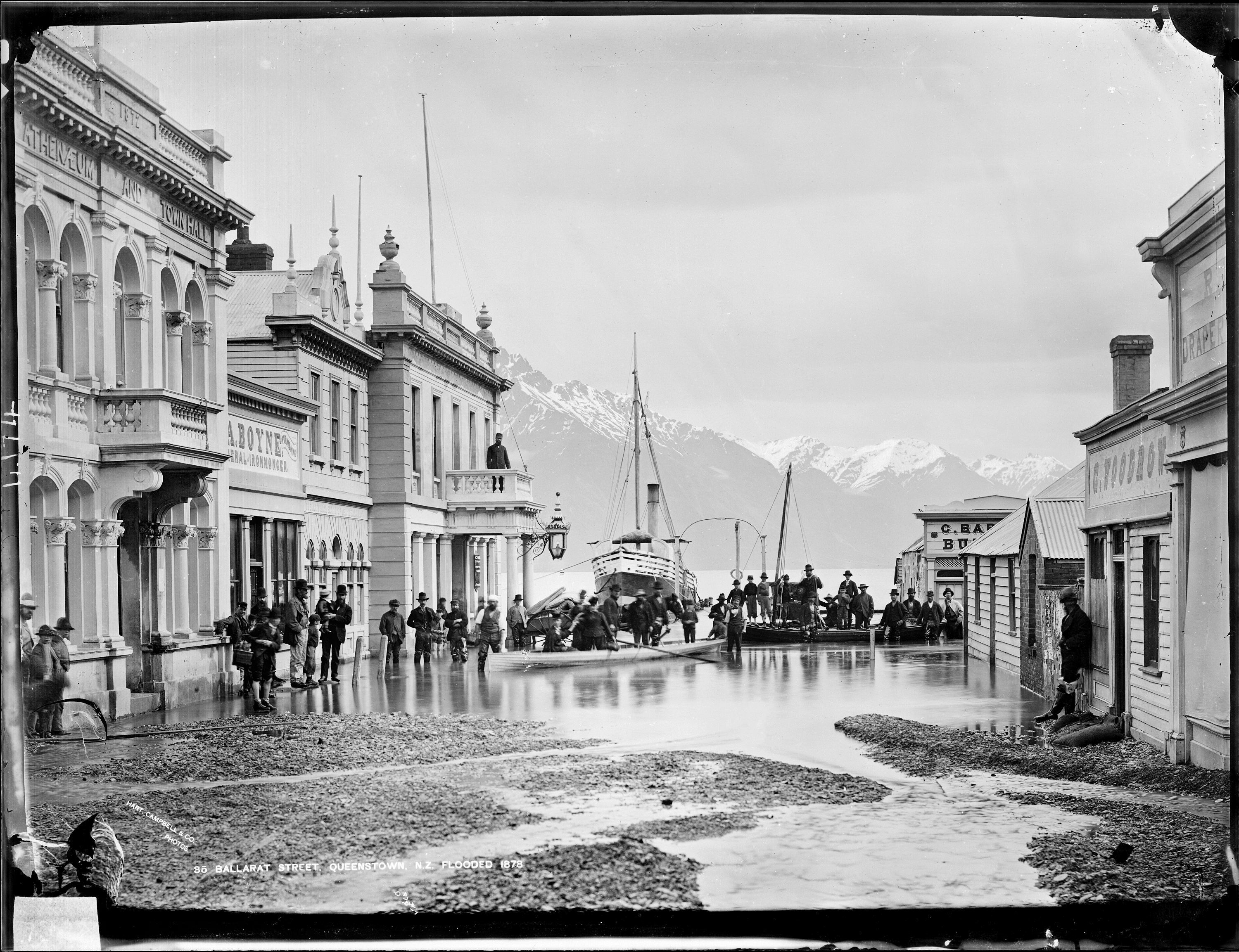
Queenstown flood of 1878

Flood and fire threatened the Wakatip Mail newspaper in its early years. In 1878 there was a major flood in Queenstown and the newspaper's stock was damaged.

The following year two of Warren's children lit some paper and the newspaper office was completely destroyed by fire, along with a new type and materials only been received from Melbourne the previous day. The paper missed only one issue, with help from the Arrow Observer newspaper.

In 1883 Warren himself was in strife following the Mail publication of a scathing article about a public address by J T Marryat Hornsby of the neighbouring Arrowtown newspaper, the Lake County Press. The Mail had implied that Hornsby was a convict by saying he came from Tasmania. Hornsby successfully sued for damages for libel.
