= Francis St Omer =

New Zealand mayor

Francis St Omer (1827 – 18 April 1915) was a baker, restaurateur, and councillor in Queenstown, New Zealand. He was born in Marseille, France, and in his youth pursued the gold rushes of California, Victoria, and in 1863 Queenstown. He operated a bakery and restaurant business until his death. St Omer was a councillor for 11 years and the mayor of Queenstown Borough from 1887 to 1891 and 1894 to 1903.

In 1863, to assuage the treeless landscape, St Omer planted ‘weeping willow’ trees around the edge of the lake in Queenstown Bay and with his son Frank, and Lewis Hotop the chemist, planted amenity trees all around Queenstown. After Francis’ death, the tree-planting work was continued by Frank, a lover of trees and birds who left his estate to the Borough Council for the beautification of Queenstown.
