= Mount Hutt =

Mountain and ski field in the South Island of New Zealand

Coordinates: 43°28′S 171°32′E

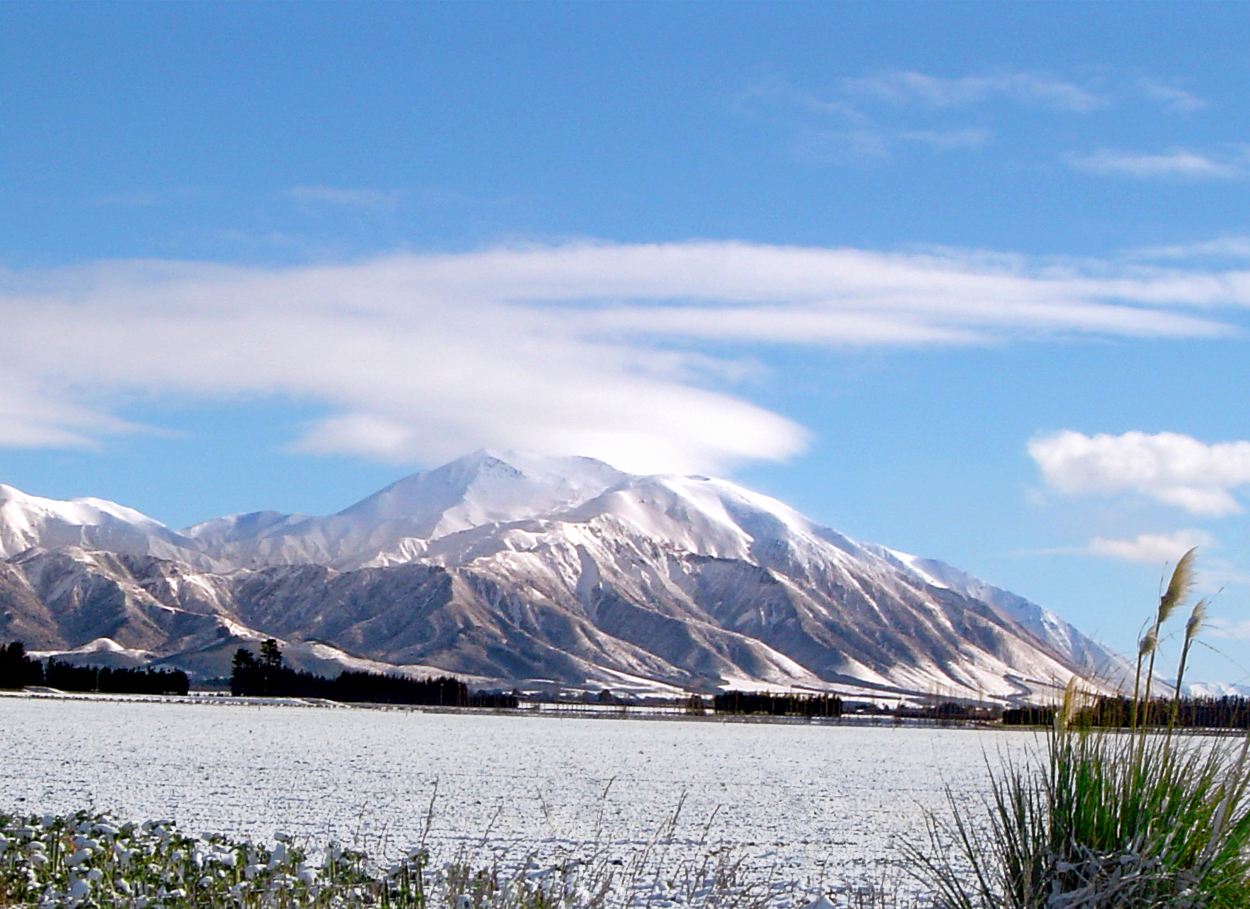
Mount Hutt

Location in Canterbury

Mount Hutt (Māori: Ōpuke) is a mountain of the Southern Alps located to the west of the Canterbury Plains in the South Island of New Zealand. It rises above the braided upper reaches of the Rakaia River, and is located 80 km (50 mi) west of Christchurch. Its summit is 2190 metres above sea level.

== Toponymy ==
Mount Hutt was named by the Canterbury Association surveyor Joseph Thomas after John Hutt, an early member of the Association. The New Zealand Ministry for Culture and Heritage gives a translation of "place of the hill" for the Māori name Ōpuke.

== Ski field ==
=== History ===
A proposal for a ski field on Mount Hutt was floated by the Methven Lions Club in the late 1960s. However, there were concerns that providing an access road would prove too difficult. A local resident and heavy machinery contractor, Doug Hood, proved that a road access could be created when he drove a bulldozer up a ridge in 1971, forming a track that is the basis of the current access road. Financing of a ski field development then began. An Austrian ski instructor, Willy Huber, built a hut on the mountain and took snow measurements to demonstrate that a ski field was viable. A full access road was created by Doug Hood, and by the winter of 1973, there was a rope tow operating on the slopes, with a T-bar in service by 1974. The Mt. Hutt Ski and Alpine Tourist Company was registered in 1972 to raise funds for further development. The constitution of the company stated that at least 75% of the shareholding should be locally-based. Financing of further development of the ski field remained difficult. An Auckland-based company, bought a controlling interest in the company, but was then taken over by Japanese investors through the Victoria USA Company. By 1984, their interests in the Mount Hutt ski field had been bought by the Mount Cook tourism company, owned by Air New Zealand.

By 2000, Air New Zealand owned three South Island ski areas: Coronet Peak, The Remarkables and Mount Hutt - collectively known as nzski.com. In 2002, Air New Zealand sold its NZSki subsidiary for NZD 27 million to joint venture Southern Alpine Resort Recreation Limited, comprising NZSki management, Millbrook Resort developer Graham Smolenski, Tourism Milford Ltd and Trojan Holdings Ltd.

=== Operations ===
The mountain is home to a commercial alpine ski area offering 3.65 square kilometres of skiable terrain and a vertical of 683 metres. The ski field is owned and operated by NZSki, along with Coronet Peak and The Remarkables in Queenstown.

It caters for a wide range of skier and snowboarder abilities, with two surface/conveyor lifts, a high-speed six seater chairlift, a high-speed eight seater chairlift and a fixed-grip three seater chairlift. The lift infrastructure provides access to a wide range of beginner, intermediate and advanced runs, access to large off-piste areas and several terrain parks. The most advanced runs on the mountain are through the rock formations at the top of the field known as "The Towers", and the South Face.

The snow season is from June to October. Mount Hutt is known for being the first ski field in the Southern Hemisphere to open at the beginning of each season. On 12 August 2010, winds of up to 200 km/h struck the ski area, resulting in its closure along with the access road, and stranding 1200 people on the mountain overnight, where they were accommodated in the ski-field's base buildings. The road was reopened the following day.

There is no accommodation on the mountain, but visitors can stay in the nearby town of Methven, a 35-minute drive to the mountain. The larger town of Ashburton is 55 minutes away. The city of Christchurch is one hour 45 minutes drive away.

In 2020, the Zionist Federation of New Zealand lobbied the ski-field to remove a commemorative plaque to one of its founders, Willi Huber, a former member of the Waffen-SS. The Federation also lobbied for the renaming of a ski trail and alpine restaurant that were named after Huber. NZSki have renamed the ski trail and restaurant.

=== Awards ===
The World Ski Awards website has recognised Mount Hutt with the award of New Zealand's Best Ski Resort for ten consecutive years from 2015 to 2024.

== Gallery ==
Mount Hutt

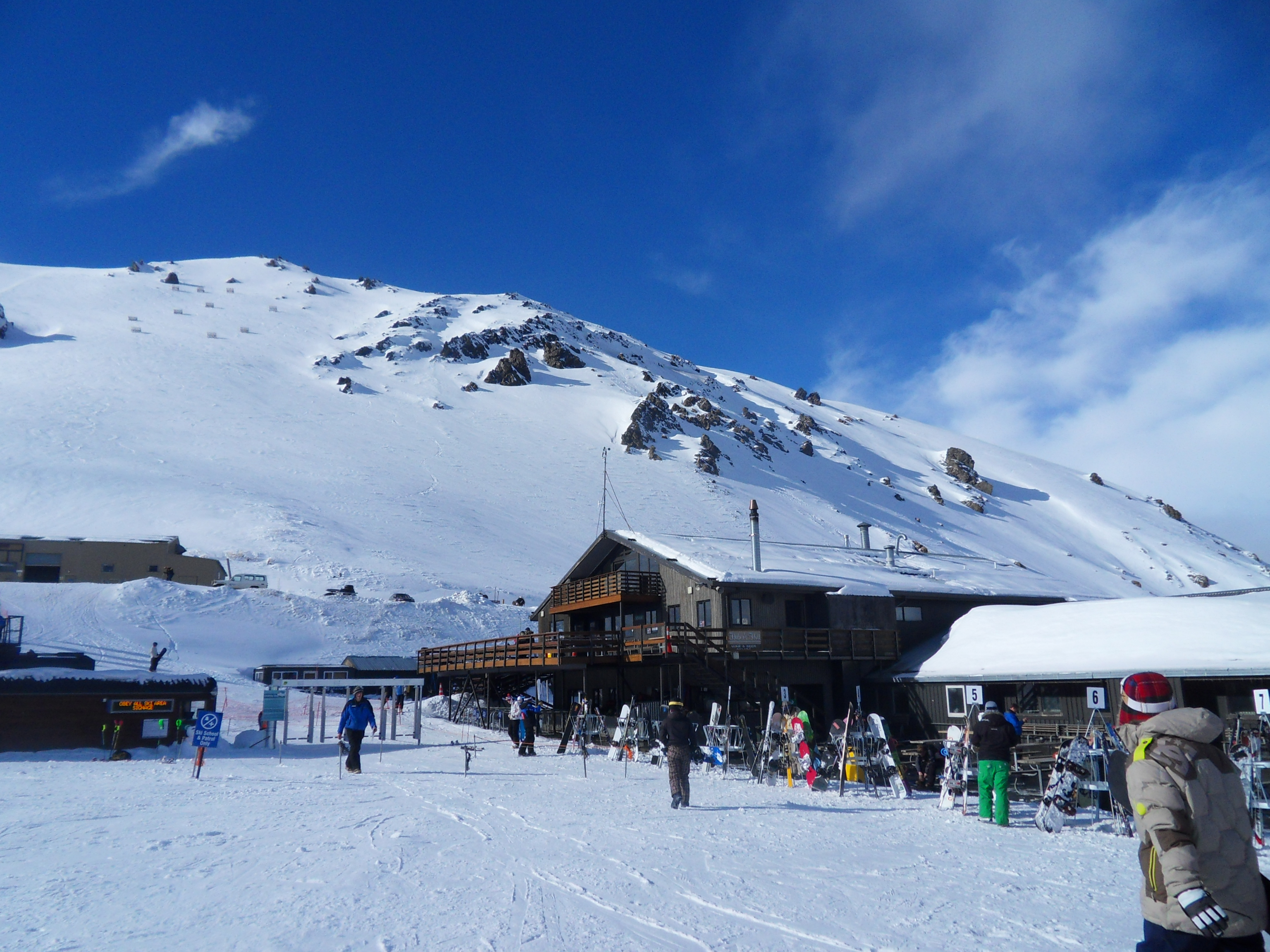
Mt Hutt ski centre

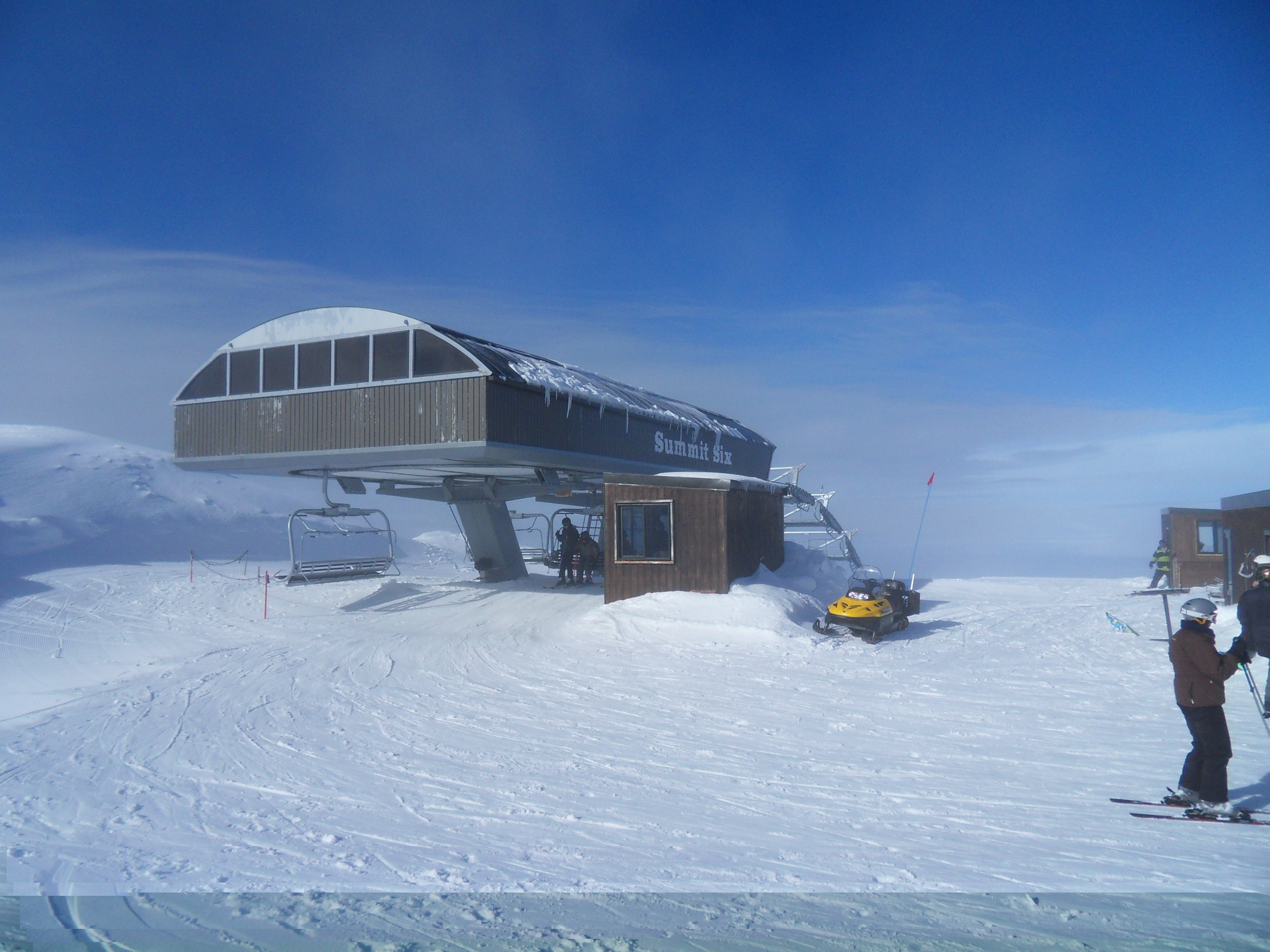
Top of Summit Six chairlift

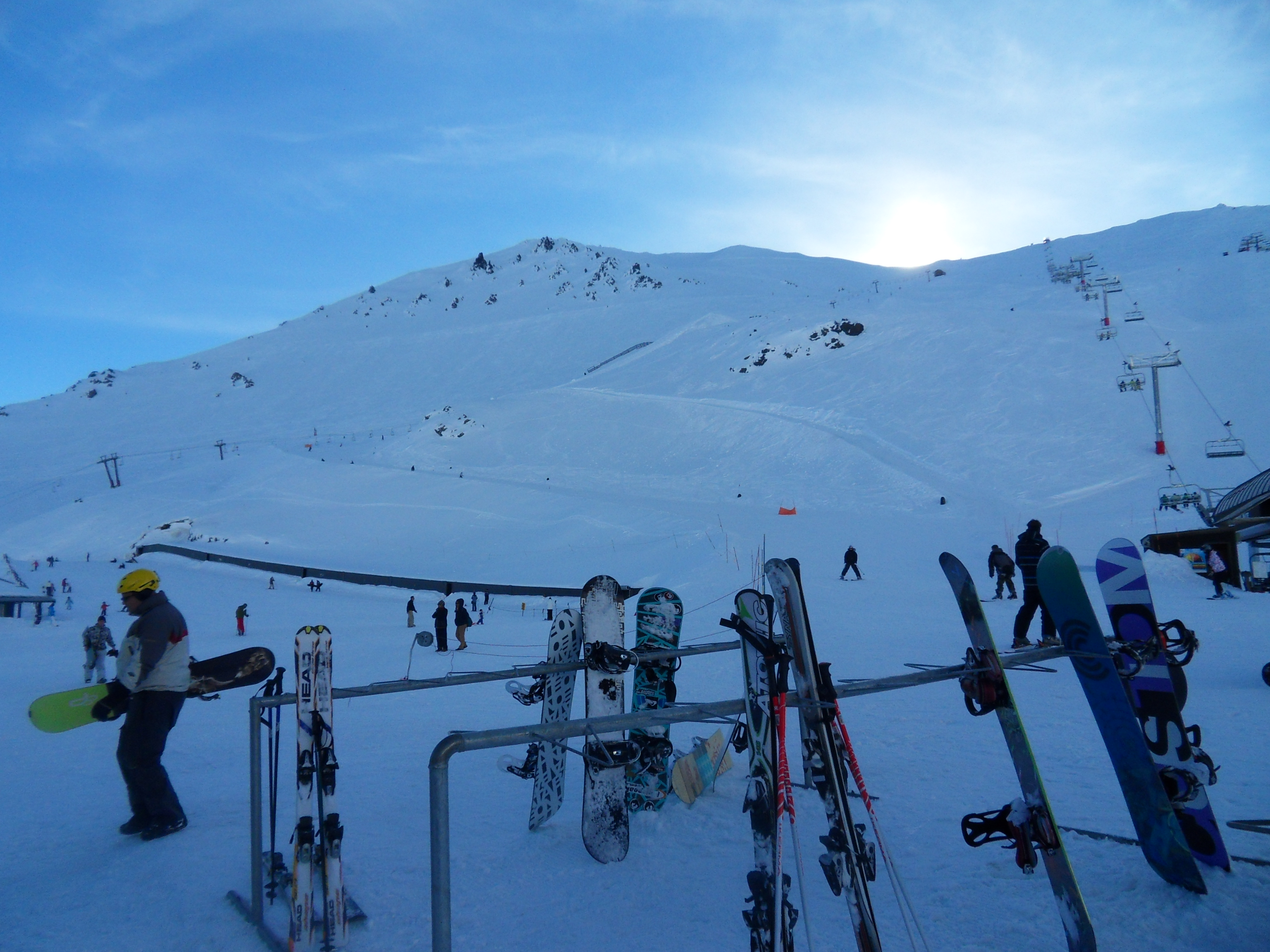
Base of ski area

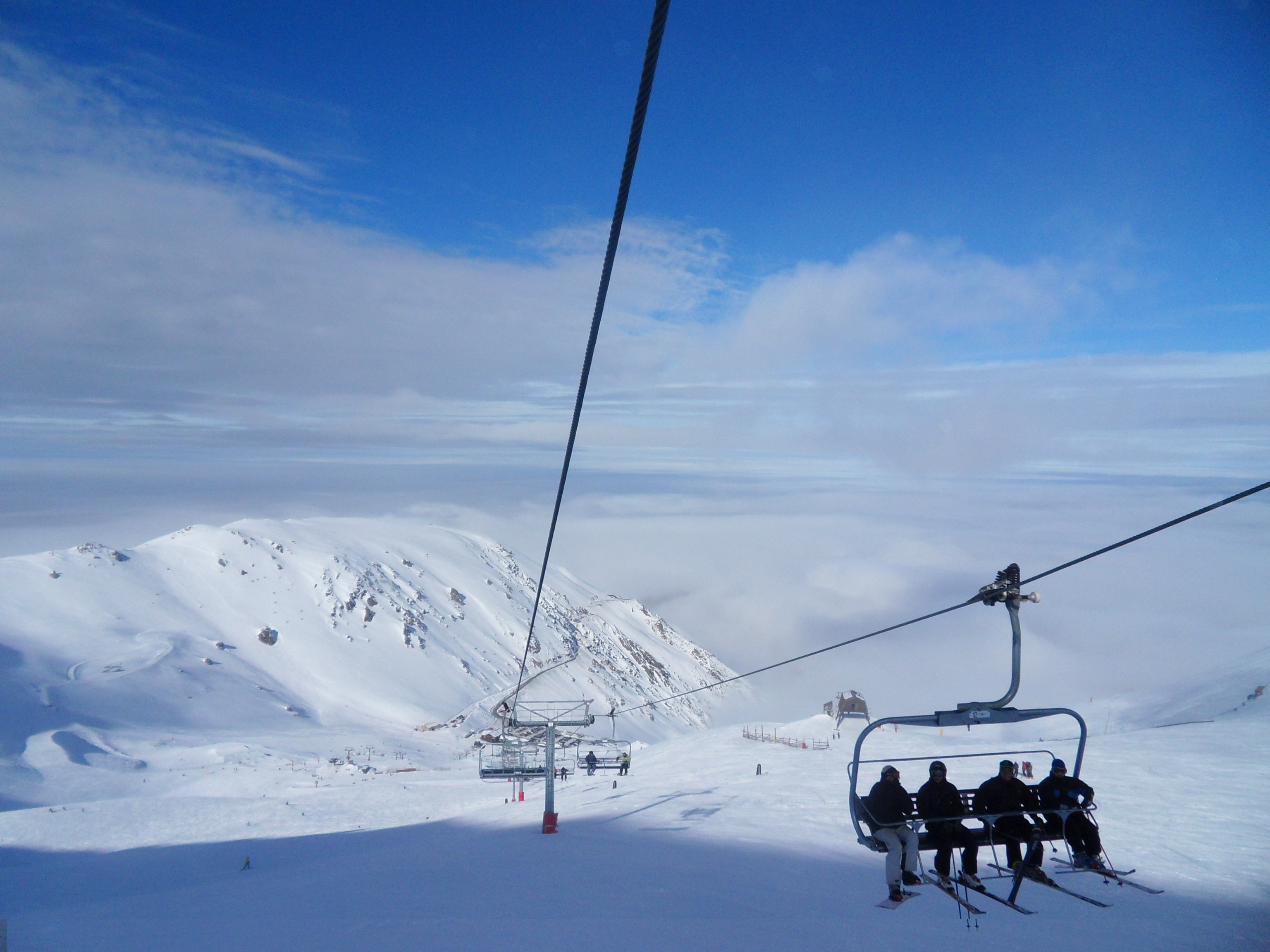
Chairlift over Mount Hutt

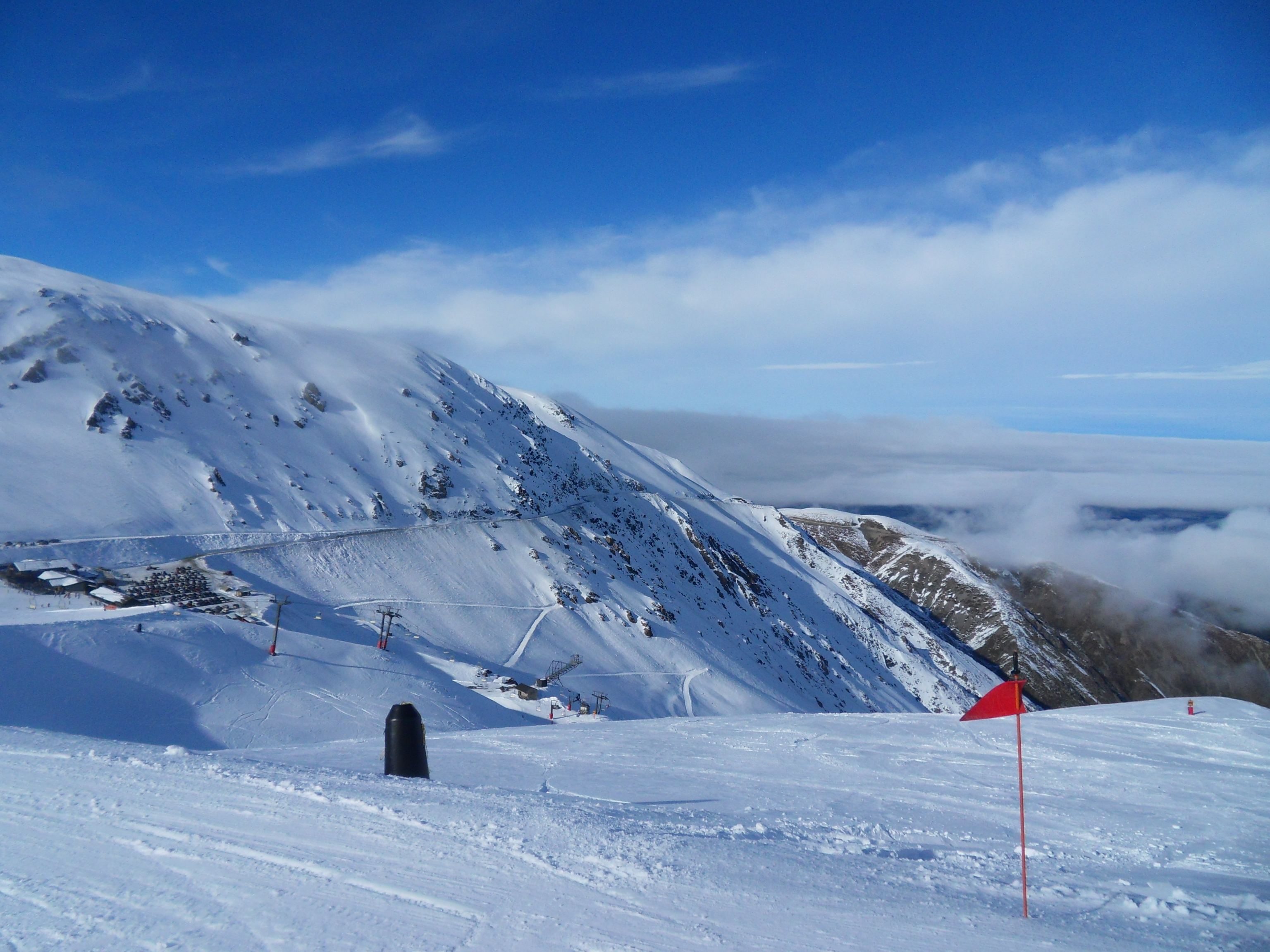
Access road to Mount Hutt

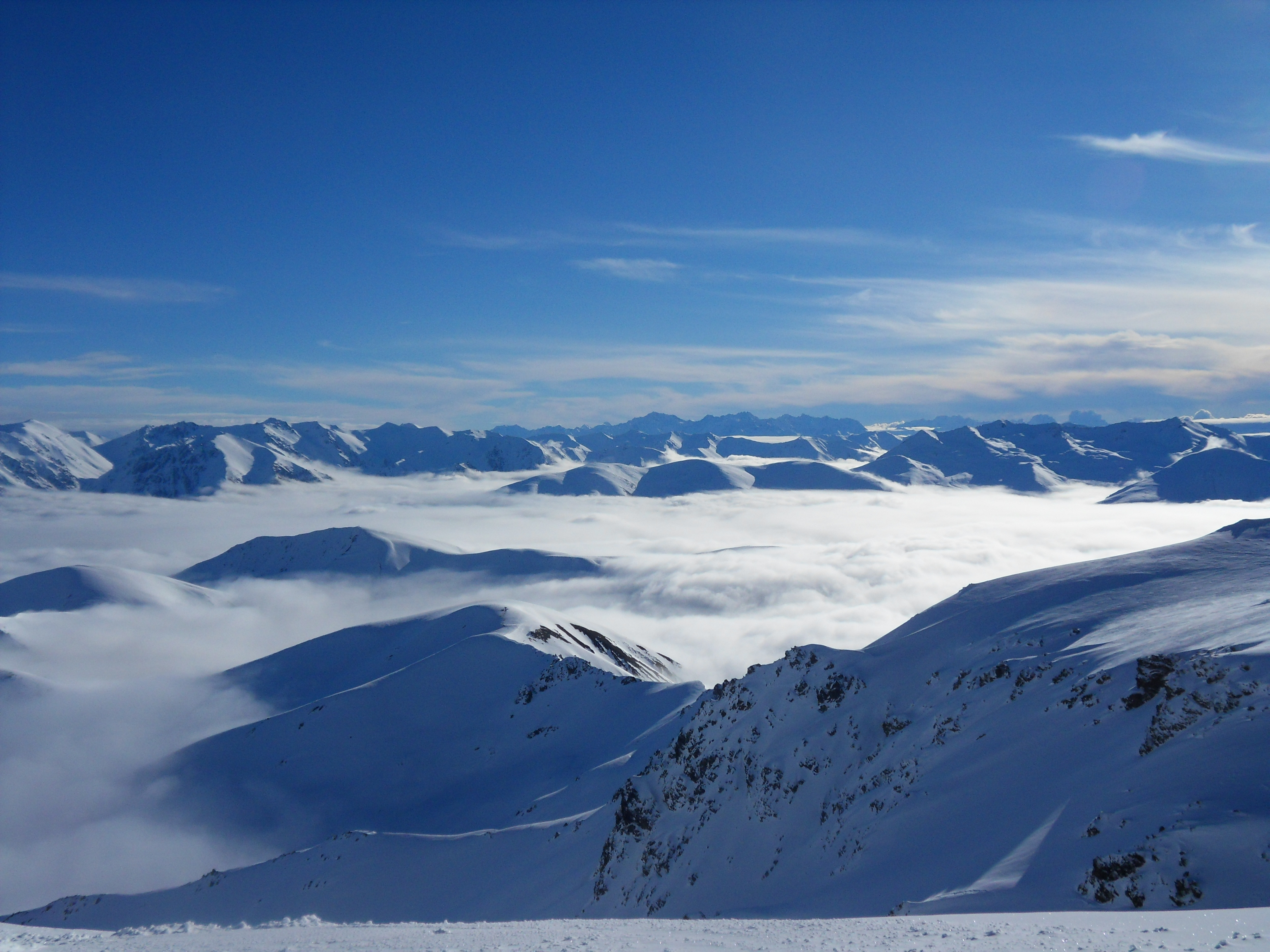
Southern Alps from summit

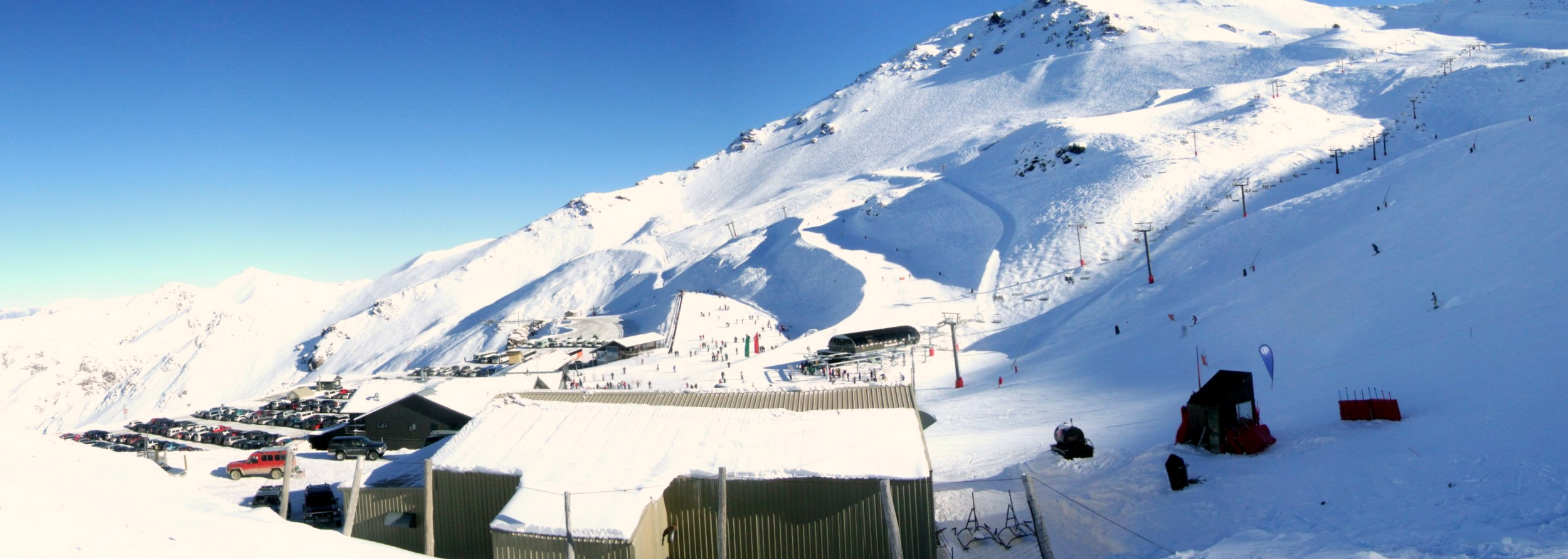
Ski area from base

== Climate ==
Mount Hutt in the Koppen-Geiger Classification System, is a Tundra Climate (ET). Mount Hutt features a cold enough temperature for skifields. Below is a climate of Mount Hutt Skifield:

Climate data for Mt Hutt Skifield, elevation 1,600 m (5,200 ft) (1980–1990)
Month	Jan	Feb	Mar	Apr	May	Jun	Jul	Aug	Sep	Oct	Nov	Dec	Year
Mean daily maximum °C (°F)	13.4 (56.1)	13.4 (56.1)	11.3 (52.3)	9.6 (49.3)	6.2 (43.2)	3.3 (37.9)	1.6 (34.9)	2.4 (36.3)	4.6 (40.3)	6.9 (44.4)	9.6 (49.3)	11.5 (52.7)	7.8 (46.1)
Daily mean °C (°F)	9.4 (48.9)	9.2 (48.6)	7.3 (45.1)	5.4 (41.7)	2.4 (36.3)	0.1 (32.2)	−1.5 (29.3)	−0.8 (30.6)	1.2 (34.2)	3.2 (37.8)	5.6 (42.1)	7.5 (45.5)	4.1 (39.4)
Mean daily minimum °C (°F)	5.1 (41.2)	5.0 (41.0)	3.4 (38.1)	1.2 (34.2)	−1.3 (29.7)	−3.1 (26.4)	−4.6 (23.7)	−4.1 (24.6)	−2.3 (27.9)	−0.4 (31.3)	1.8 (35.2)	3.5 (38.3)	0.4 (32.6)
Source: NIWA

== Fauna ==
During the summer months four species of Alpine grasshoppers can be found within the ski field boundary. They include Sigaus villosus which can be found along the ridgelines, Brachaspis nivalis which lives on the rocky scree, Sigaus australis and Paprides nitidus which both live in the alpine tussocklands.

Mount Hutt is the type locality for the endemic moth Orocrambus aethonellus.

== Conservation areas ==
There are several conservation areas located on or near Mt Hutt, including the Awa Awa Rata Reserve, Pudding Hill Scenic Reserve, and the Redcliffe Conservation Area.
