= John Hotop =

NZ international rugby union player

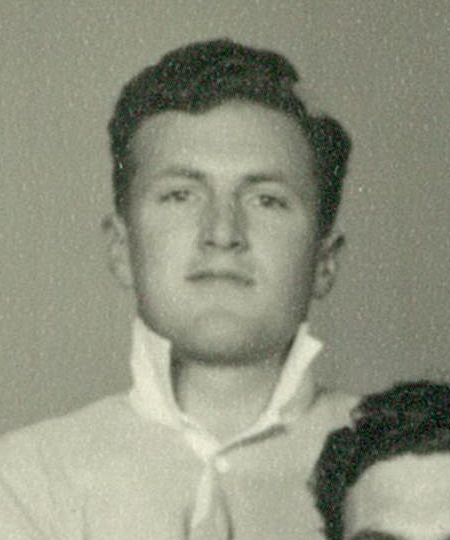
- Hotop in 1950
- Born: 7 December 1929 Alexandra, New Zealand
- Died: 30 August 2015 (aged 85) Hamilton, New Zealand
- Height: 1.70 m (5 ft 7 in)
- Weight: 75 kg (165 lb)
- School: Waitaki Boys' High School
- University: Canterbury Agricultural College; Massey Agricultural College
- Notable relative: Lewis Hotop (great-uncle)

Rugby union career
- Position: First five-eighth
Provincial / State sides
Years	Team	Apps	(Points)
1948–49	Bush		
1950	Manawatu		
1951–55, 60–61	Canterbury	48	
1956–59	Otago		
International career
Years	Team	Apps	(Points)
1951	NZ Universities		
1952, 1955	New Zealand	3	(6)

John Hotop (7 December 1929 – 30 August 2015) was a New Zealand rugby union player. A first five-eighth, Hotop represented Bush, Manawatu, Canterbury, and Otago at a provincial level. He was a member of the New Zealand national side, the All Blacks, in 1952 and 1955. Three internationals against Australia were the full extent of his involvement with the All Blacks.
