= Mayor of Queenstown Borough =

Mayor of Queenstown Borough Council
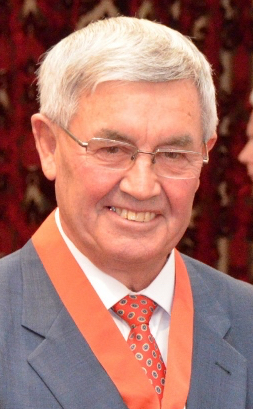
- John Davies, the last holder of the post
- Style: His Worship
- Term length: varied
- Formation: 1866
- First holder: James William Robertson
- Final holder: John Davies
- Abolished: 1986
- Succession: Mayor of Queenstown-Lakes

This is a list of mayors of Queenstown Borough in New Zealand. The mayor was the head of the Queenstown Borough Council. The borough existed from 1866 until 1986, when it merged with the Lake County to form Queenstown-Lakes District. During the 120 years of its existence, there were 21 mayors.

== List of mayors ==
The Queenstown Borough Council was constituted in 1866. James William Robertson was elected as the first mayor in July 1866. John Davies was the last mayor of the borough council (1983–1986) and became the first mayor of Queenstown-Lakes (1986–1989).

The following list is complete:

	Name	Portrait	Term	Notes
1	James William Robertson		1866–1869	
2	Bendix Hallenstein		1869–1872	
3	Michael Malaghan		1872–1874	
4	Thomas G. Betts		1874–1877	
5	William Warren		1877–1878	
6	Frederick Henry Daniel		1878–1880	
7	Lewis Hotop		1880–1881	
(5)	William Warren		1881–1882	2nd period
8	James Reid		1882–1887	
9	Francis St Omer		1887–1891	
(7)	Lewis Hotop		1891–1894	2nd period
(9)	Francis St Omer		1894–1903	2nd period
(7)	Lewis Hotop		1903–1906	3rd period
10	Maurice James Gavin		1906–1908	
11	John Edgar Sr.		1908–1913	
12	Donald F. Sutherland		1913–1917	
13	Andrew Simson		1917–1927	
14	(William) Harry Overton		1927–1939	
15	William Anderson		1939–1950	
16	D.W. Thomson		1950–1952	
17	R.C. Robins		1952–1953	Acting mayor
(15)	William Anderson		1953–1956	2nd period
(17)	R.C. Robins		1956–1962	2nd period
18	George D. Cochrane		1962–1968	
19	Warren Cooper		1968–1975	
20	Jim Grant		1975–1983	
21	John Davies		1983–1986	

== Place names ==
Some streets and places in Queenstown are named after former borough council mayors; Robertson Street in Frankton, Hallenstein Street, Malaghan Road and Malaghan Street, Warren Park, Hotop Rise, Reid Street, St. Omer Park, Anderson Heights, Robins Road, Grant Road, and Davies Place.
