= Mount Cook Group =

Travel and holiday companies of New Zealand

Mount Cook Group was a New Zealand tourism and transport operator founded on 2 April 1912 by Rodolph Lysaght Wigley. Originally a road transport business, the Mount Cook Tourist Company of New Zealand became a public company in 1928. By 1930 Wigley had built it into the largest tourist organisation in New Zealand, and it was renamed Mount Cook and Southern Lakes Tourist Company, the name adopted in the mid-1930s. In 1976 it became The Mount Cook Group Ltd. The company was split in 1989 with various operations progressively sold off, with Air New Zealand retaining the airline businesses. The company remained (on paper) until 17 June 2013 when it was amalgamated into Air New Zealand Associated Companies Limited, a holding company for Air New Zealand's various businesses (and current "owner" of Mount Cook Airline).

== Operations ==
=== Mount Cook Landlines ===
Rodolph Wigley's Mt. Cook Motor Car Service provided the first car transportation from Fairlie to the Hermitage in February 1906. The company owned four Darracq 40 and 60 hp service cars and carried mail and passengers. The business collapsed in November 1907 but in 1912 Wigley restarted operations as the Mount Cook Motor Co. Ltd. By 1918, there was a weekly service car between Mt Cook and Queenstown over the Lindis Pass using Cadillacs. The company depot was in Fairlie. Rodolph Wigley's Mount Cook Motor Co, later called Mount Cook Landlines, provided inter-city and sightseeing coach services. Originally providing services to the Aoraki / Mount Cook region of the South Island, the company grew to take over many other New Zealand bus companies: H&H of Invercargill, Luxury Landlines and Hawkes Bay Motor Co of the North Island. In 1989 the Mount Cook Landline exchanged several routes with Newmans Coach Lines, the two companies each specialised to the South Island and North Island respectively. When in 1989 Air New Zealand sold Mount Cook Group's non-airline assets to Tourism Holdings Limited, the latter scrapped the coach route services and the Mount Cook brand.

=== Mount Cook Airline ===
In December 2019, Mount Cook Airline was merged into Air New Zealand and ceased operations.

=== Mount Cook Freightlines ===
Mount Cook Freightlines was a trucking company which operated linehaul and rural freight services. It grew out of the general passenger/mail operation in 1925, and grew steadily a freight network around the South Island, and, later into the North Island. In its last few years it provided part of Air New Zealand's domestic cargo network. Mount Cook Freightlines was later purchased by F.W. McDowall Ltd.

=== Mount Cook Line Skifields ===
In 1921 Rodolph Wigley leased The Hermitage hotel from the Department of Tourist and Health Resorts and began expanding it, installing electricity and telegraph, catering for skaters and skiers and employing mountain guides. He introduced and developed skiing, mountain climbing and winter holidays. The company was the first to offer package holidays to tourists. In August 1923 Wigley and two guides became the first to climb Mt Cook in winter. The first skifield in New Zealand was developed on Ball Glacier in Aoraki / Mount Cook National Park; the company opened another at Ōhau. Mount Cook Line Skifields developed and operated the Queenstown ski areas of Coronet Peak and The Remarkables, now owned by NZSki Ltd.

=== Mount Cook Ski Planes ===
The company developed ski plane conversions of Auster aircraft in its own workshops at Fairlie, in South Canterbury. Now independently owned, Mount Cook Ski Planes operates Cessna 185s and Pilatus Porters, and is the only company to land scenic flights on the Tasman Glacier to this day.

== Other holdings ==
The Mount Cook company at various times owned or established many other tourism and transport businesses in New Zealand:

- Parts of Fiordland Travel, now known as Real Journeys
- Mutual Rental Cars, which became the New Zealand operation of Avis Rent a Car System
- Ball Hut, a ski and tramping hut in Aoraki / Mount Cook National Park
- The Hermitage hotel at Mount Cook Village
- Chateau Tongariro hotel in Tongariro National Park
- Eichardt's Hotel, in Queenstown

== See also ==
- Mount Cook Group Ltd v Johnstone Motors Ltd
