= Mayor of Queenstown-Lakes =

Mayor of Queenstown Lakes
- Coat of arms of the Queenstown Lakes District Council
- Incumbent; John Glover since 17 October 2025
- Style: His Worship
- Term length: Three years
- Inaugural holder: John Davies
- Formation: 1986; 40 years ago
- Salary: $143,734
- Website: Official website

The mayor of Queenstown Lakes in New Zealand presides over the Queenstown Lakes District Council. The district council has existed since 1986 and there have been eight mayors so far.

== List of mayors ==
In 1986, the Queenstown Borough Council merged with the Lake County to form Queenstown Lakes District Council. The last mayor of Queenstown Borough, John Davies, was elected as the first mayor of Queenstown Lakes District. In 1989, Arrowtown Borough Council amalgamated with Queenstown Lakes District Council in the 1989 local government reforms.

	Name	Portrait	Term	Notes
1	John Davies		1986–1989	last mayor of Queenstown Borough
2	David Bradford		1989–1995	
3	Warren Cooper		1995–2001	previously mayor of Queenstown Borough
4	Clive Geddes		2001–2010	
5	Vanessa van Uden		2010–2016	
6	Jim Boult		2016–2022	
7	Glyn Lewers		2022–2025	
8	John Glover		2025–present	

== Place names ==
Some streets and places in Queenstown are named after former borough council mayors; Robertson Street in Frankton, Hallenstein Street, Malaghan Road and Malaghan Street, Warren Park, Hotop Rise, Reid Street, St. Omer Park, Anderson Heights, Robins Road, Grant Road, and Davies Place.
