= Lewis Hotop =

New Zealand pharmacist and politician (c.1844–1922)

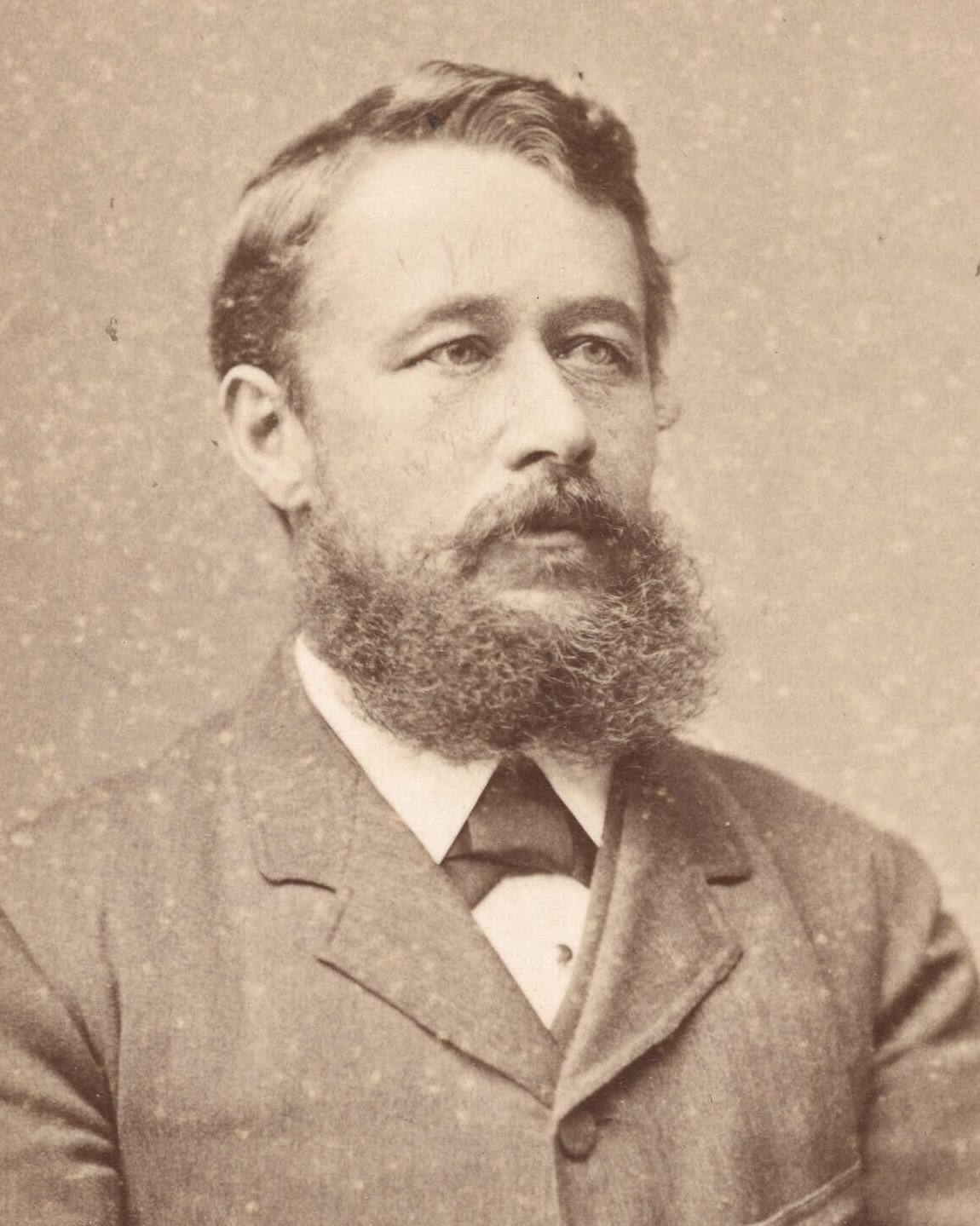

7th Mayor of Queenstown
- In office 1880–1881
- Preceded by: Frederick Henry Daniel
- Succeeded by: William Warren
- In office 1891–1894
- Preceded by: Francis St Omer
- Succeeded by: Francis St Omer
- In office 1903–1906
- Preceded by: Francis St Omer
- Succeeded by: Maurice James Gavin

Personal details
- Born: Ludwig Adolph Heinrich Hotop; 1844 Saalfeld, Thuringia, Germany
- Died: 29 September 1922 (aged 78) Dunedin, New Zealand
- Spouse: Catherine Elizabeth Sproule (m. 1873; died 1895)
- Relations: John Hotop (great-nephew)

Lewis Adolph Henry Hotop JP (born Ludwig Adolph Heinrich Hotop; c. 1844 – 29 September 1922) was a New Zealand pharmacist, politician and Arbor Day advocate. He served as mayor of Queenstown Borough on three occasions.

== Biography ==
Hotop was born in about 1844, and educated in Saalfeld. He went to sea for about four years before settling in Queenstown, New Zealand, in 1867. He initially worked for Hallenstein and Company, and later bought their pharmacy business on the corner of Rees and Ballarat Streets.

He was naturalised in Australia in 1866 and in New Zealand in 1870. By 1873, he was registered by the Otago provincial government as a vendor of poisons and he purchased a newsagent business in Clyde later that year. On 18 November 1873, he married Catherine Elizabeth Sproule, who was governess to the children of Bendix Hallenstein, at Hallenstein's home.

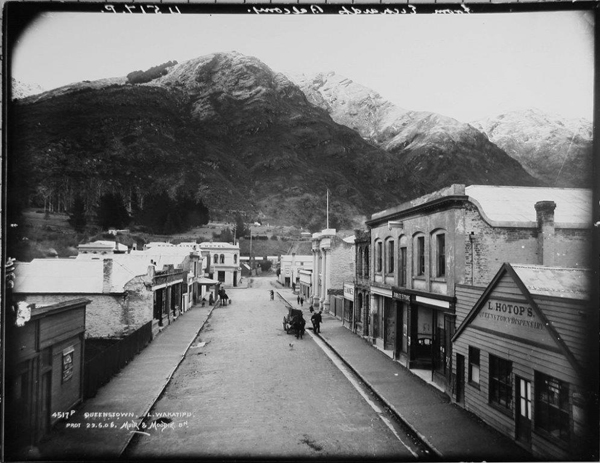
View of Rees Street, Queenstown, in 1906, with Hotop's dispensary in the right foreground

In 1878, Hotop was appointed manager of the Wakatipu Steam Navigation Company, providing passenger services on Lake Wakatipu. He was also an agent for the Union Insurance Company and manager of the Mount Earnslaw Quartz-mining Company. Flooding in Queenstown in October 1878 saw extensive damage to businesses close to Lake Wakatipu and Hotop's chemist shop was one of the worst affected: flood waters in nearby Eichardt's Hotel were reported to be four feet (1.2 m) deep.

Hotop served as mayor of Queenstown from 1880 to 1881, from 1891 to 1894 and again from 1903 to 1906.

In 1886, Hotop was appointed a member of a committee seeking to establish a branch of the Otago School of Mines in Queenstown and elected vice-president of the Lakes District Acclimatisation Society. He played a prominent role in the introduction of trout to the district and maintained a private hatchery. In 1887, he was appointed as a trustee and president of the Queenstown Athenaeum. In 1889, he was appointed secretary of the Queenstown committee for the New Zealand and South Seas Exhibition and also appointed the government meteorologist at the new weather station in Queenstown. He was elected a director of the Great Northern Dredging Company in 1890. In 1892, he was appointed as a coroner. He also served as a trustee on the Wakatipu District Hospital Board and secretary of the Queenstown branch of the Otago Expansion League.

Hotop was a passionate tree planter and was largely responsible for plantings around the shores of Lake Wakatipu and town environs. As a member of the Queenstown school committee, Hotop first moved the introduction of Arbor Day and the inaugural observance took place in Queenstown in 1890. He was referred to as the "father of Arbour Day in New Zealand". He also served on the committee of the Wakatipu Horticultural Society.

Hotop was widowed by the death from cancer of his wife in 1895. He was active in the Anglican church, serving as a vestryman, church warden and lay reader, and attending the Dunedin diocesan synod in 1891.

During World War I, questions were raised in Parliament about Hotop's and his family's loyalty by John Payne, a member of Parliament who was known for his strong anti-German sentiment. Hotop was defended by the government ministers of the day, who noted his naturalised status, his long and ongoing contributions to the Queenstown community and his family members' service in the New Zealand armed forces, including one severely wounded at Gallipoli.

Hotop sold his dispensary in 1920. He died two years later in Dunedin and was buried at Andersons Bay Cemetery.

Hotop's Rise, a walkway from Camp Street to Frankton Road in Queenstown, is named in his honour.
