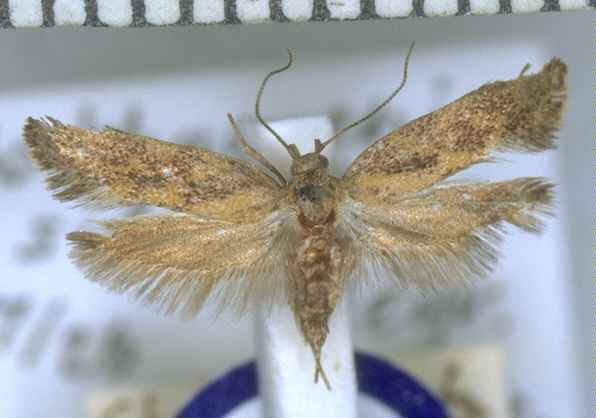
- Male lectotype

Scientific classification
- Kingdom: Animalia
- Phylum: Arthropoda
- Class: Insecta
- Order: Lepidoptera
- Family: Oecophoridae
- Genus: Tingena
- Species: T. siderodeta

Binomial name
- Tingena siderodeta (Meyrick, 1883)

Synonyms
- Oecophora siderodeta Meyrick, 1883; Borkhausenia siderodeta (Meyrick, 1883)

= Tingena siderodeta =

Species of moth, endemic to New Zealand

Tingena siderodeta is a species of moth in the family Oecophoridae. It is endemic to New Zealand and is found throughout the country. This species prefers to inhabit native forest and scrubland but has also been found to be common in cultivated landscapes. The larvae are litter feeders and have been observed in Kanuka and Manuka forest. The adult moths are on the wing from October to February and are day flying but have also been trapped at night.

== Taxonomy ==
This species was first described by Edward Meyrick in 1883 using specimens collected at Christchurch, Dunedin and Lake Wakatipu during December to February and named Oecophora siderodeta. Meyrick went on to give a more detailed description in 1884. In 1915 Meyrick placed this species within the Borkhausenia genus. In 1926 Alfred Philpott studied and illustrated the genitalia of the male of this species. George Hudson discussed and illustrated this species under the name B. phegophylla in his 1928 publication The butterflies and moths of New Zealand. In 1988 Dugdale placed this species in the genus Tingena. The male lectotype, collected in Christchurch, is held at the Natural History Museum, London.

== Description ==
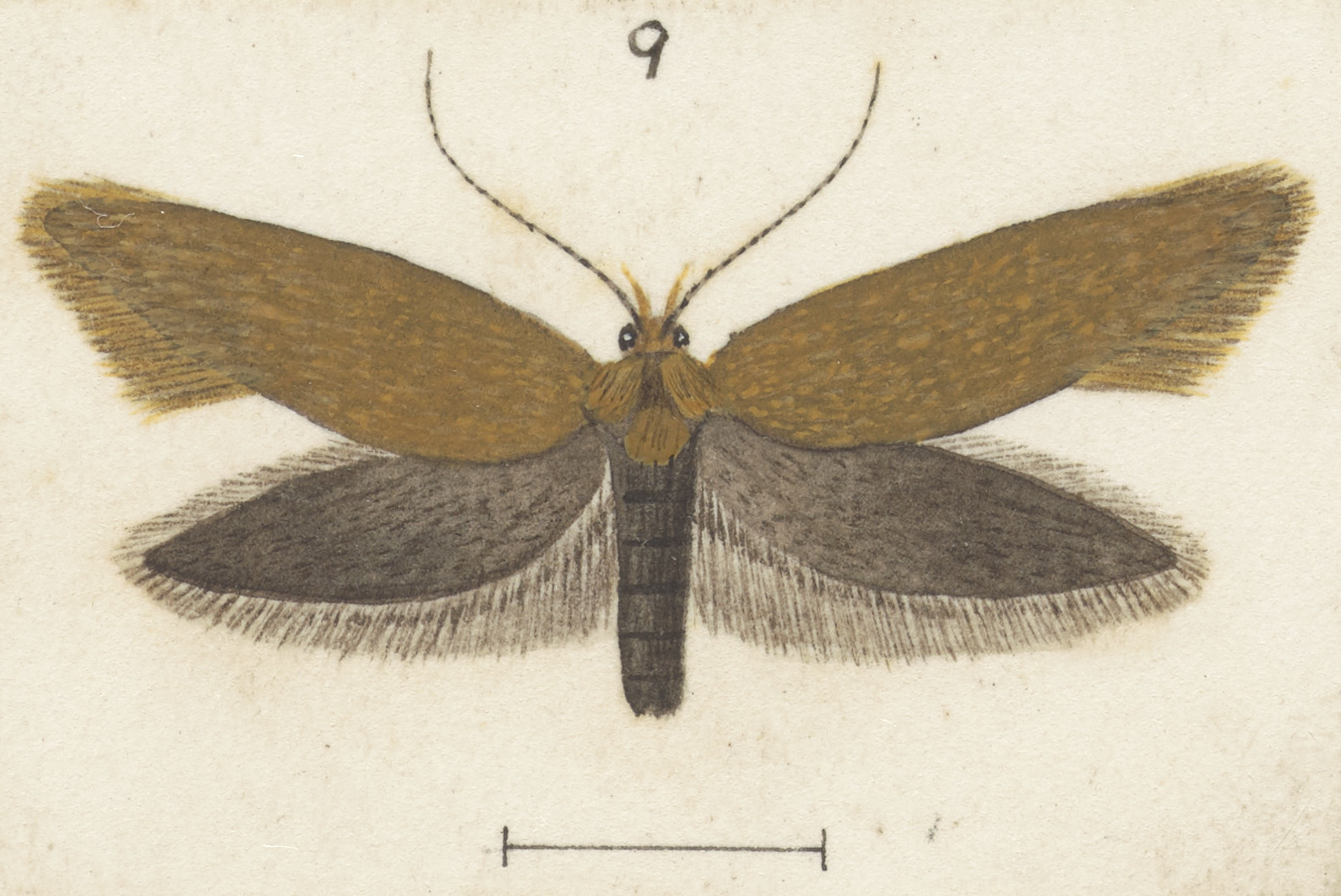
Illustration of T. siderodeta by George Hudson.

Meyrick first described this species as follows:

Fore wings narrow, ochreous, suffused with dark fuscous, sometimes with three obscure fasciae, inner margin generally paler; hind wings dark grey.

Meyrick, in his more detailed description, stated:

Male, female. — 12-14 mm. Head, palpi, and thorax ochreous, densely mixed with dark fuscous. Antennas dark fuscous. Abdomen grey. Legs dark fuscous, central ring of tibiae, hairs of posterior tibiaa, and apex of all joints whitish. Forewings elongate, narrow, costa gently arched, more strongly near base, apex pointed, hindmargin extremely obliquely rounded; brownish-ochreous, densely irrorated with dark fuscous, which tends to form three broad oblique cloudy fasciae, but these are often wholly suffused and confluent; generally there is a more or less distinctly clear brownish-ochreous space towards base of inner margin : cilia ochreous-whitish, with numerous irregular rows of dark fuscous points, tips clear whitish. Hindwings dark fuscous; cilia grey, towards base dark fuscous.

Philpott stated that specimens of this species collected in Stewart Island / Rakiura are larger than those from other locations.

== Distribution ==
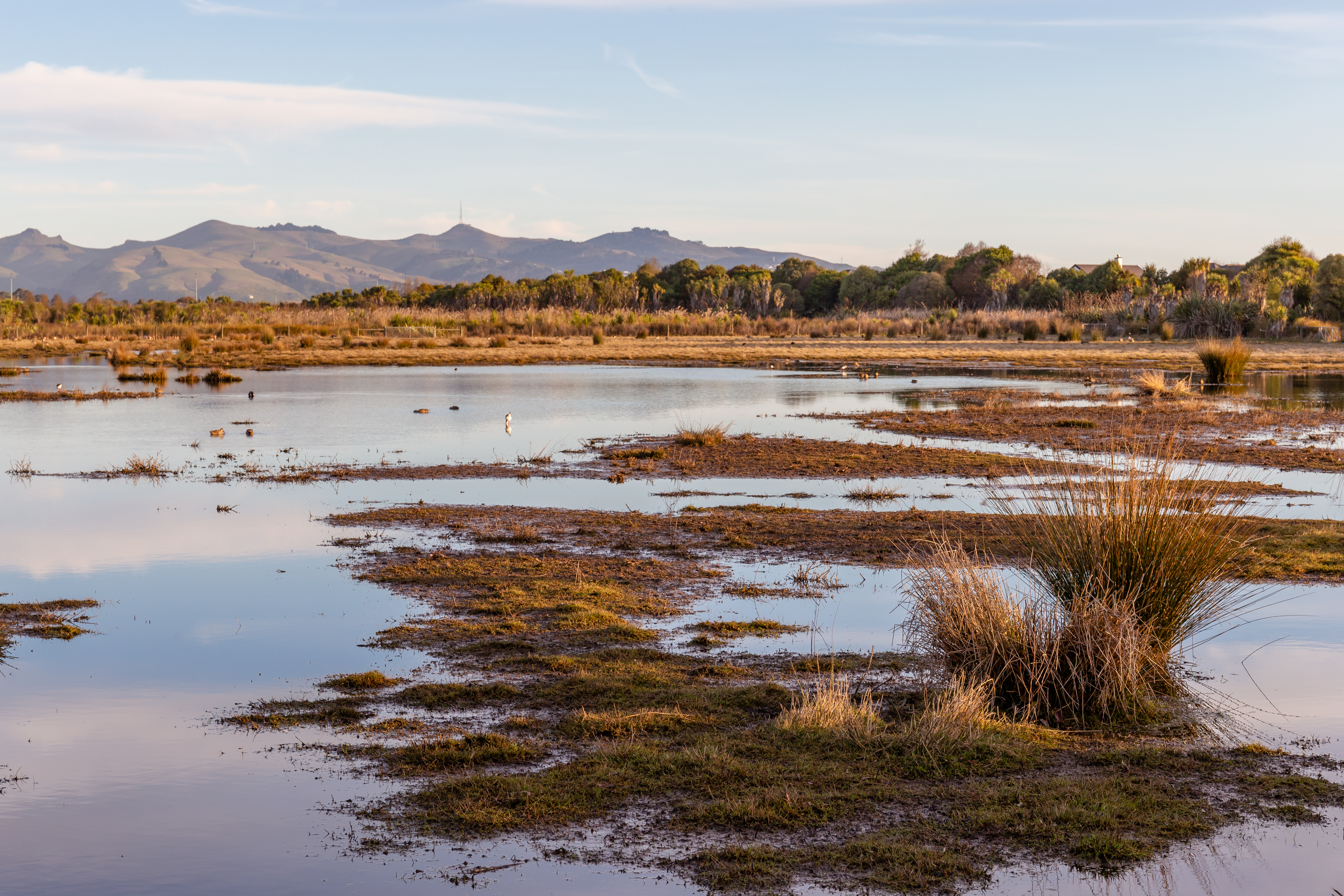
Travis Wetland, a location where T. siderodeta has been observed.

This species is endemic to New Zealand and is found throughout the country. This species has also been found in a site of ecological significance in Christchurch as set out in the Christchurch District Plan.

== Behaviour ==
Adults of this species are on the wing from October until February. It can be found flying in daylight hours and has been collected when resting on fence posts or tree trunks. This species has also been collected at night via a Malaise trap. When idle this species resembles a small pointed twig as its body position ensures its antennae are held backwards, the wings encircle the body and the rear end of the insect is lifted with the head lowered.

== Habitat ==
This species can be found in cultivated landscapes and prefers open clearings. The larvae of this species are leaf litter feeders in scrubland and native forest and have been found in Kānuka and Mānuka stands.
