= NZSki =

New Zealand company

NZSki Ltd is a New Zealand company that manages three major New Zealand commercial ski fields; two in Queenstown, The Remarkables and Coronet Peak, and Mount Hutt nearer to Christchurch. The company is based in Queenstown. It was formerly part of the Mount Cook Group, which was bought by Air New Zealand in 1984 and split up in 1989.

In 2002, Air New Zealand sold NZSki for NZD 27 million to joint venture Southern Alpine Resort Recreation Limited, comprising NZSki management, Millbrook Resort developer Graham Smolenski, Tourism Milford Limited and Trojan Holdings.

== See also ==
- Skiing in New Zealand
