= Coronet Peak =

Mountain in New Zealand

Coordinates: 44.926898°S 168.736053°E

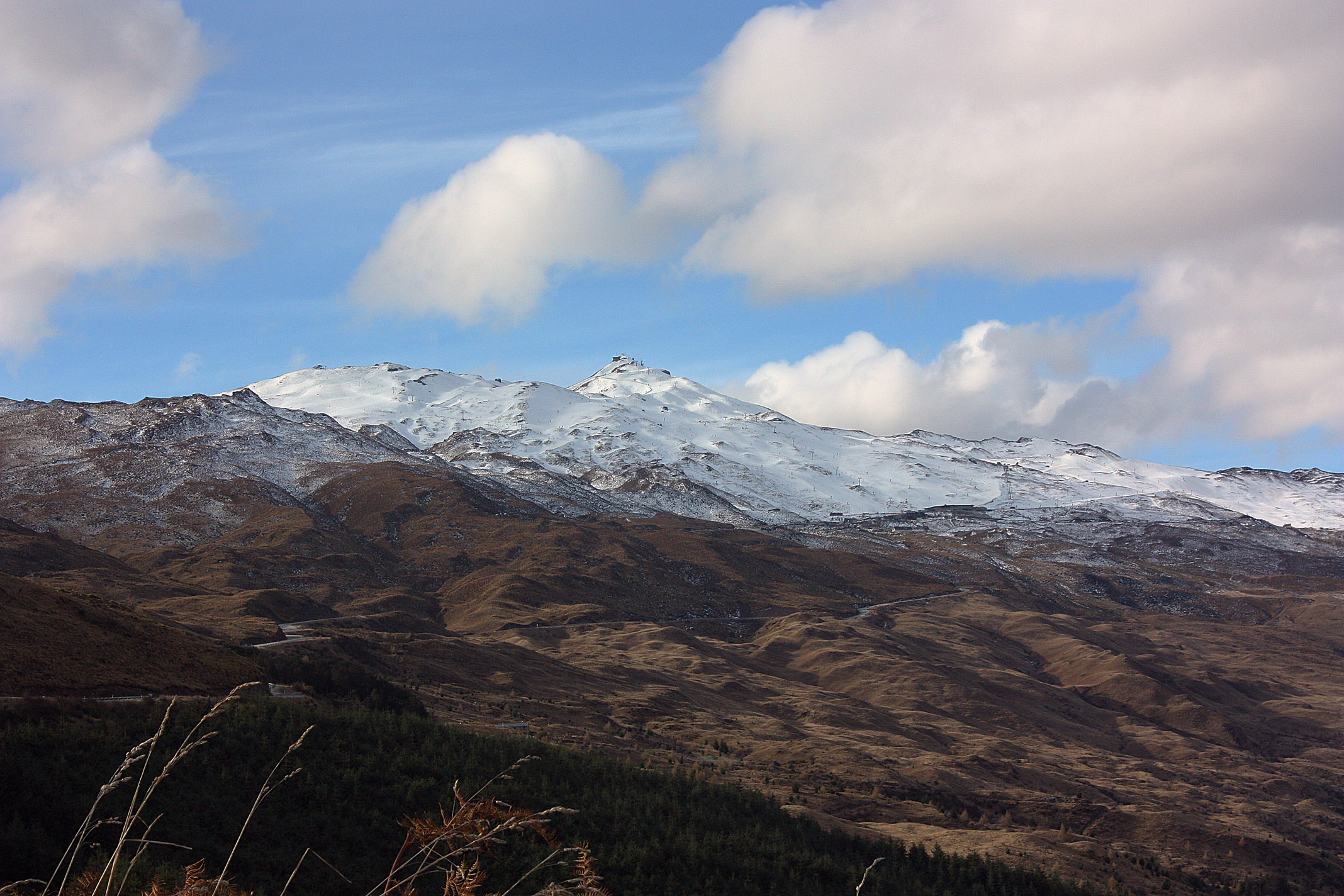
View of Coronet Peak during the ski season

Coronet Peak is a commercial skifield in Queenstown, New Zealand located seven kilometres west of Arrowtown, on the southern slopes of the 1,649-metre peak which shares its name. A popular ski resort in the Southern Hemisphere, Coronet Peak offers a long snow season, well received skiing and snowboarding terrain and lift systems.

== Location ==
Coronet Peak is one of New Zealand's most popular ski resorts due to its proximity to Queenstown, varied terrain and quality facilities, offering two high speed six-seater chairlifts and a high speed beginner chairlift. The view from the skifield south across Lake Wakatipu and the smaller nearby Lake Hayes is a further contributor to the mountain's success. Dubbed the "original" resort ski area Coronet Peak is only 25 minutes from Queenstown.

== Facilities ==
Coronet Peak has extensive snowmaking and receives about 2 m of snow per year. The season typically runs from early June to early-October or late-September. It is one of the only skifields in New Zealand to offer night skiing on Wednesday, Friday and Saturday nights from July to mid-September and First Tracks, operating between 8–9 am offer a more secluded period before the main traffic hits later on during the day. Coronet Peak (and nearby mountains) are popular locations for school trips because of their extensive facilities. Children 6 and younger receive free day lift passes.

== Lifts ==
Coronet Peak has a lifts system consisting of a combined six seater chairlift and gondola, the Coronet Express, as well as two detachable chairlifts, the six seater Greengages express and the Meadows Express quad, as well as a T-bar. There are also three magic carpet lifts in the beginner area. The lifts can transport 9000 people per hour combined.

| Lift Name | Type | Ride Time | Capacity | Speed | Starting Elevation | Vertical Rise |
|---|---|---|---|---|---|---|
| Coronet express | Combined Chairlift and gondola | 5 min | 3000 people per hour | 5 m/s | 1190m | 440m |
| Greengates Express | Six Seater Detachable Chairlift | 5 min | 2400 people per hour | 5 m/s | 1160m | 412m |
| Meadows Express | Quad Detachable Chairlift | 2 min | 2000 people per hour | 5 m/s | 1190m | 120m |
| Rocky Gully T Bar | T bar | 6 Min | 1000 people per hour | 2 m/s | 1190m | 223m |

== Ski terrain ==
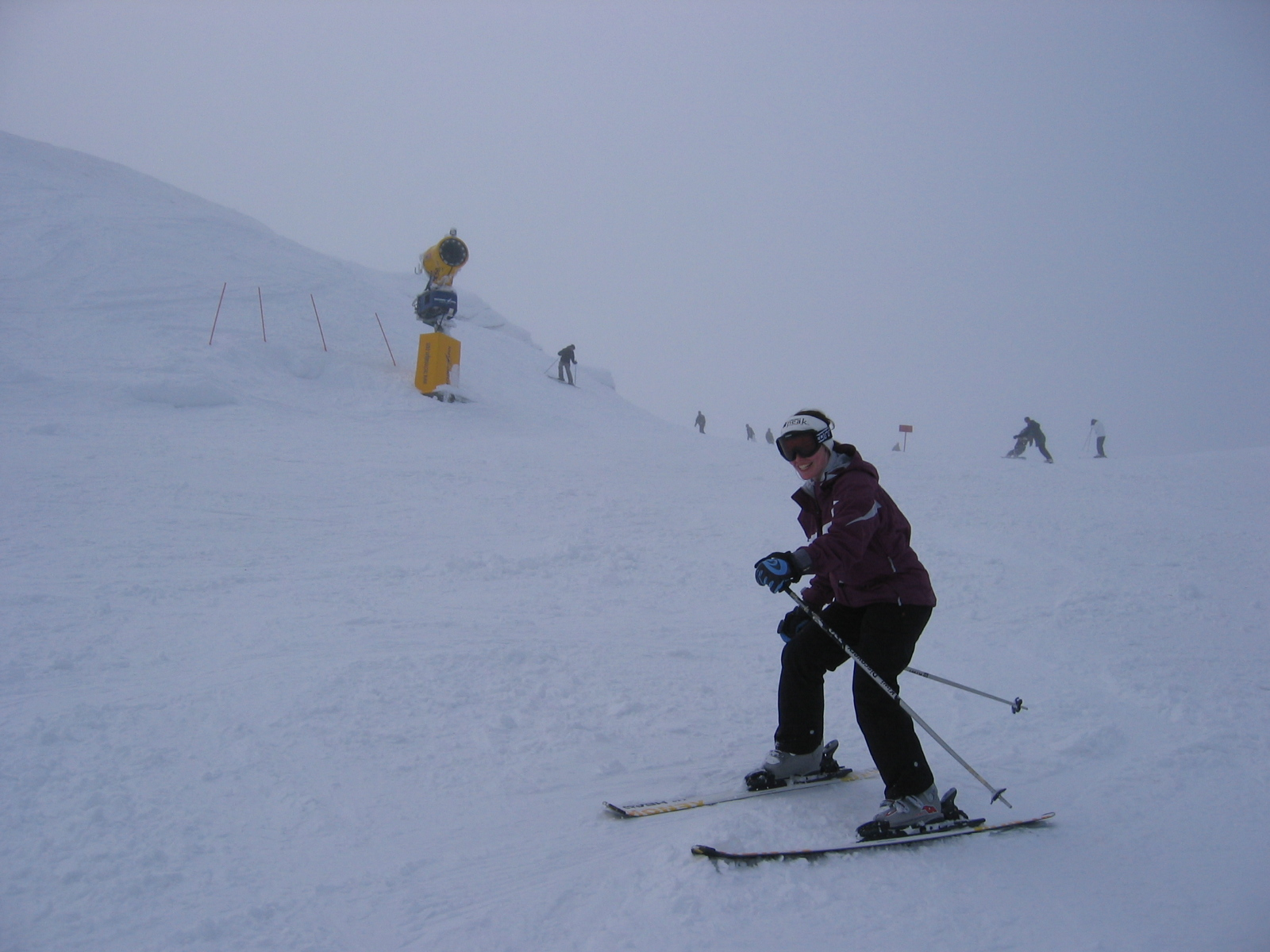
Skier at Coronet Peak

Popular runs on Coronet Peak include Big Easy (beginners), M1, Greengates and Shirtfront (intermediate), and Exchange Drop and the Back Bowls (expert). Like European Alpine ski resorts, Coronet's Peak offers much well-developed piste skiing.

== Events ==
Coronet Peak is often the site of calendared international ski races and the training ground for many world class athletes.

== Operations ==
The field is operated by NZSki Ltd, who also manages The Remarkables skifield just across the valley and Mount Hutt in Canterbury, near to Christchurch.

== History ==
The field was New Zealand's first commercial skifield, and was opened in 1947 with a single rope tow. Tourism pioneer Harry Wigley of Mt Cook airline fame commissioned Bill Hamilton to design and build this lift.

As visitor numbers grew, the field introduced New Zealand's first double then treble chairlifts and in 1994, the second high-speed quad chairlift.

In 2002 the Mount Cook Group sold Coronet Peak and The Remarkables to a consortium of Queenstown businesspeople, now NZSki Ltd, who also bought Mount Hutt.

For the 2008 season NZSki Ltd invested over $30 million on a new base building and 141 new snow cannons.

The 2009 season opened with new snowmaking equipment, new piste groomers, and a dedicated children's lift.

The 2010 season saw the Meadows double chairlift replaced with a detachable quad chairlift featuring a self lowering safety bar and child friendly restraints.
