= Northland Region =

Region of New Zealand

Coordinates: 35.58°S 173.97°E

Northland Region Te Tai Tokerau
- Region
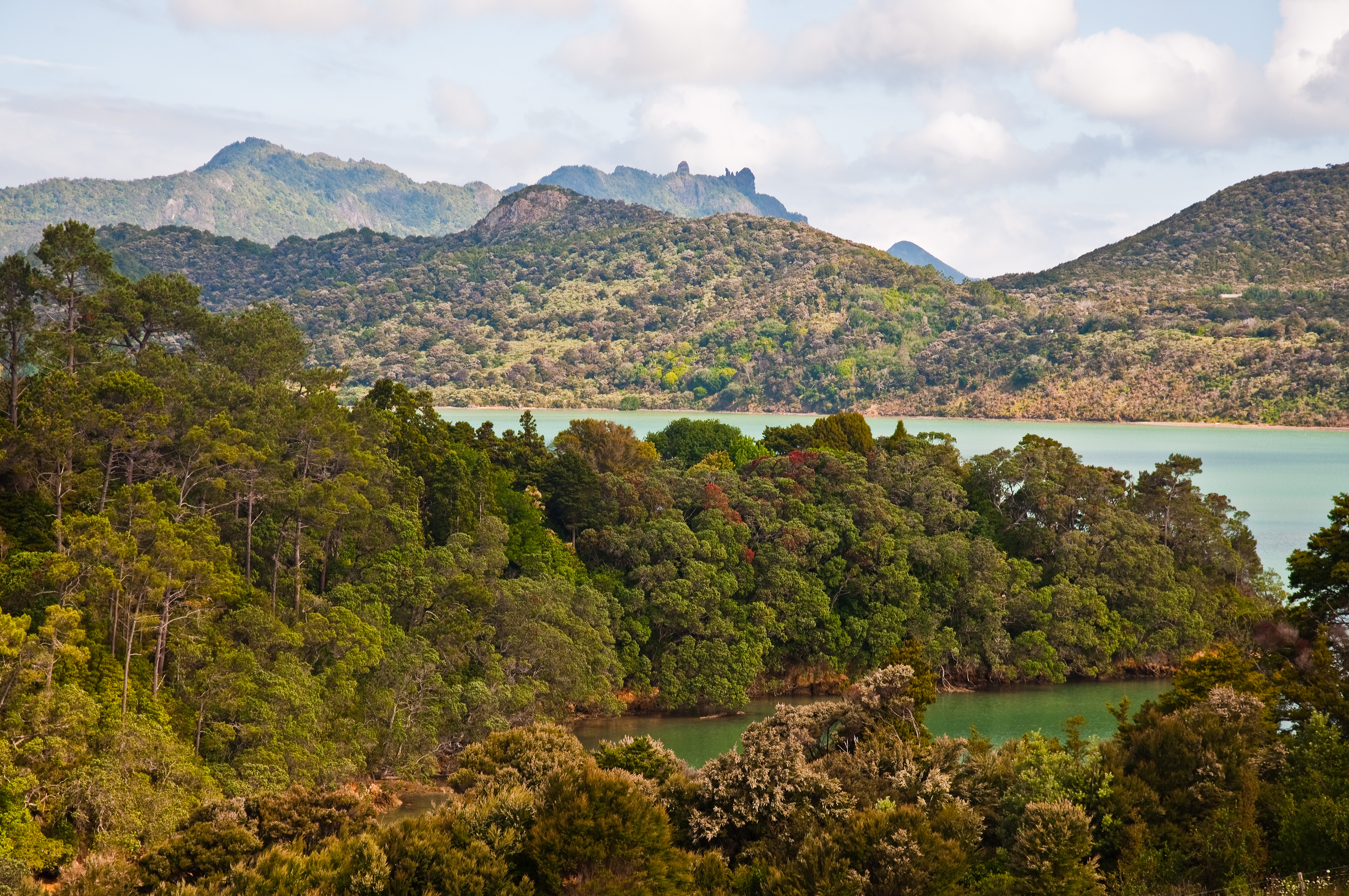
- Landscape viewed from Parua Bay
- Motto: Our Northland – together we thrive
- Northland within New Zealand
- Country: New Zealand
- Island: North Island
- Seat: Whangārei

Government
  - Type: Regional council
  - Body: Northland Regional Council
  - Chair: Pita Tipene
  - Deputy: Jack Craw

Area
  - Total: 13,789 km^{2} (5,324 sq mi)
  - Land: 12,507.89 km^{2} (4,829.32 sq mi)

Population (June 2025)
  - Total: 201,100
  - Density: 16.08/km^{2} (41.64/sq mi)

GDP
  - Total: NZ$9.321 billion (2021) (10th)
  - Per capita: NZ$46,611 (2021)
- HDI (2023): 0.899 very high · 14th
- Website: www.nrc.govt.nz

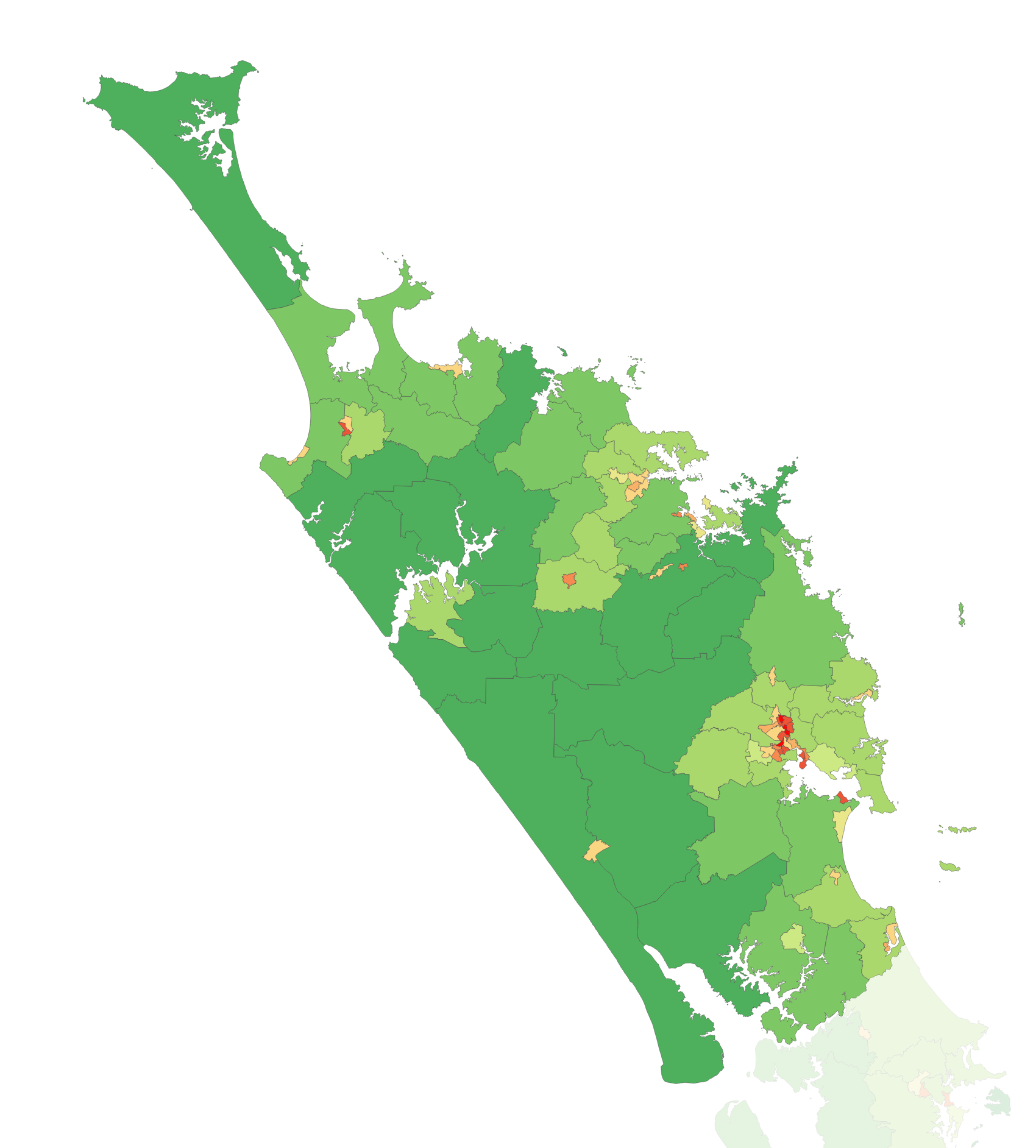
Population density for Northland in the 2023 census

Northland (Māori: Te Tai Tokerau), officially the Northland Region, is the northernmost of New Zealand's 16 local government regions. The region is known for its warm weather. The major population centre is the city of Whangārei, and the largest town is Kerikeri. At the 2018 New Zealand census, Northland recorded a population growth spurt of 18.1% since the previous 2013 census, placing it as the fastest growing region in New Zealand, ahead of other strong growth regions such as the Bay of Plenty Region (2nd with 15%) and Waikato (3rd with 13.5%).

== Geography ==
The Northland Region occupies the northern 80% (265 kilometres (165 miles)) of the 330 kilometres (210 miles) Northland Peninsula, the southernmost part of which is in the Auckland region. It is bounded to the west by the Tasman Sea, and to the east by the Pacific Ocean. The land is predominantly rolling hill country. Farming and forestry occupy over half of the land and are two of the region's main industries.

Although many of the region's kauri forests were felled during the 19th century, some areas still exist where this rare giant grows tall. New Zealand's largest tree, Tāne Mahuta, stands in the Waipoua Forest south of the Hokianga Harbour. These kauri forests are also home to Te Raupua at 781 metres (2,562 ft), the highest point in the region. Northland has many endemic plant and invertebrate species such as the endangered snail pūpū harakeke (Placostylus ambagiosus), stick insects and the Northland green tree gecko (Naultinus grayii).

The western coast is dominated by several long straight beaches, the most famous of which is the inaccurately-named 88 km stretch of Ninety Mile Beach in the region's far north. The slightly longer Ripiro Beach lies further south. Two large inlets are also located on this coast, the massive Kaipara Harbour in the south, which Northland shares with the Auckland region, and the convoluted inlets of the Hokianga Harbour.

The east coast is more rugged, and is dotted with bays and peninsulas. Several large natural harbours are found on this coast, from Parengarenga close to the region's northern tip, then Whangaroa Harbour, and past the famous Bay of Islands down to Whangārei Harbour, on the shores of which is situated the largest population centre. Numerous islands dot this coast, notably the Cavalli Islands, the Hen and Chicken Islands, Aorangaia Island and the Poor Knights Islands.

The northernmost points of the North Island mainland lie at the top of Northland. These include several points often confused in the public mind as being the country's northernmost points: Cape Maria van Diemen, Spirits Bay, Cape Reinga, and North Cape. The northernmost point of the North Island is actually the Surville Cliffs, close to North Cape although the northernmost point of the country is further north, in the Kermadec chain of islands. Cape Reinga and Spirits Bay, however, have a symbolic part to play as the end of the country. In Māori mythology, it is from here that the souls of the dead depart on their journey to the afterlife.

== Climate ==
Northland has an oceanic climate (Cfb in the Köppen climate classification), but a subtropical climate in the Trewartha climate classification, with warm humid summers and mild wet winters. Due to its latitude and low elevation, it has the country's highest average annual temperature, although, as with other parts of New Zealand, the weather is changeable. In summer, maximum temperatures range from 22 °C to 26 °C, not often rising above 30 °C. In winter, maximum temperatures vary between 14 °C and 17 °C, while minima vary between 7 °C and 12 °C.

Ground frosts are rare due to the region being encircled by the moderating Pacific and Tasman waters, but light frosts do occur infrequently around Dargaville in the lowlands. The hottest months are January and February. In January 2009, excessive sunlight hours and below-average rainfall resulted in the region being declared a drought zone.

Typical annual rainfall for the region is 1500–2000 mm but varies at different altitudes. Northland has an average of 2000 sunshine hours annually. Winds are predominantly from the southwest. Occasionally in summer, the region experiences stormy conditions from former tropical cyclones, which generally become much weaker once they leave tropical latitudes.

== Government ==
The Northland Region has been governed by the present Northland Regional Council since 1989. The seat of the council is in Whangārei.

Regional council members represent 8 constituencies: Far North, Bay of Islands-Whangaroa, Mid North, Coastal Central, Coastal South, Whangārei City, Kaipara and Te Raki.

There are three territorial authorities in the region:

- Far North District Council, based in Kaikohe
- Whangarei District Council, based in the city centre.
- Kaipara District Council, based in Dargaville

Until 1989 Northland was governed by several councils and an earlier Northland Regional Council known as the Northland United Council. (It had been part of Auckland Province from 1853 until government was centralised in 1876. Long after Auckland Province ceased, the region continued to be known as North Auckland.) In 1989, Kaitaia Borough, Mangonui County, Whangaroa County, Bay of Islands County, Hokianga County, and Kaikohe Borough were amalgamated to become the Far North District. Whangarei City, Whangarei County, and Hikurangi Town Councils became the Whangarei District, with Dargaville Borough and Otamatea County becoming the Kaipara District. The Northland Regional Council became a tier of local government above these territorial authorities.

A proposal to merge the three district councils and the regional council into a unitary authority to be known as the Northland Council was rejected by the Local Government Commission in June 2015.

=== Timeline of councillors ===
Constituency	1989			1990												1991												1992												1993												1994												1995												1996												1997												1998												1999												2000												2001												2002												2003												2004												2005												2006												2007												2008												2009												2010												2011												2012												2013												2014												2015												2016												2017												2018												2019												2020												2021												2022												2023												2024												2025											
Constituency	O	N	D	J	F	M	A	M	J	J	A	S	O	N	D	J	F	M	A	M	J	J	A	S	O	N	D	J	F	M	A	M	J	J	A	S	O	N	D	J	F	M	A	M	J	J	A	S	O	N	D	J	F	M	A	M	J	J	A	S	O	N	D	J	F	M	A	M	J	J	A	S	O	N	D	J	F	M	A	M	J	J	A	S	O	N	D	J	F	M	A	M	J	J	A	S	O	N	D	J	F	M	A	M	J	J	A	S	O	N	D	J	F	M	A	M	J	J	A	S	O	N	D	J	F	M	A	M	J	J	A	S	O	N	D	J	F	M	A	M	J	J	A	S	O	N	D	J	F	M	A	M	J	J	A	S	O	N	D	J	F	M	A	M	J	J	A	S	O	N	D	J	F	M	A	M	J	J	A	S	O	N	D	J	F	M	A	M	J	J	A	S	O	N	D	J	F	M	A	M	J	J	A	S	O	N	D	J	F	M	A	M	J	J	A	S	O	N	D	J	F	M	A	M	J	J	A	S	O	N	D	J	F	M	A	M	J	J	A	S	O	N	D	J	F	M	A	M	J	J	A	S	O	N	D	J	F	M	A	M	J	J	A	S	O	N	D	J	F	M	A	M	J	J	A	S	O	N	D	J	F	M	A	M	J	J	A	S	O	N	D	J	F	M	A	M	J	J	A	S	O	N	D	J	F	M	A	M	J	J	A	S	O	N	D	J	F	M	A	M	J	J	A	S	O	N	D	J	F	M	A	M	J	J	A	S	O	N	D	J	F	M	A	M	J	J	A	S	O	N	D	J	F	M	A	M	J	J	A	S	O	N	D	J	F	M	A	M	J	J	A	S	O	N	D	J	F	M	A	M	J	J	A	S	O	N	D	J	F	M	A	M	J	J	A	S	O	N	D	J	F	M	A	M	J	J	A	S	O	N	D	J	F	M	A	M	J	J	A	S	O	N	D	J	F	M	A	M	J	J	A	S	O	N	D
Far North (Note: Te Hiku from 2013 to 2022)	missing info																																																											Robin Shepherd																																																																Ian Walker																																																																			Monty Knight																																	Mike Finlayson																																				Colin Toss																																				Joe Carr																																																																																																																																											
Hokianga-Kaikohe (Note: Far North before 2013)	Jim Peters																																																																Joe Carr																																																																Justin Blaikie																																																																abolished																																																																																																																																																																																																																																																		
Bay of Islands-Whangaroa (Note: Coastal North from 2013 to 2022, Far North before 2013)	missing info																																																																Dover Samuels																																				Lorraine Hill																																																																Bronwyn Hunt																																				Bill Shepard																																																																Marty Robinson																																																																																																																																																																										
Kaipara	missing info																																					Mark Farnsworth																																																																Graeme Ramsay																																																																Penny Smart																																																																John Blackwell																																																																																																																																																																																																													
Mid North (Note: Coastal North from 2013 to 2022, Whangarei before 2013)	missing info																																					Peter Jensen																																																																Tony Davies-Colley																																				Dover Samuels																																				Jocelyn Yeoman																																																																Geoff Crawford																																																																																																																																																																																																					
Coastal Central (Note: Whangarei before 2013)	missing info																																																																Derek Keene																																				Bill Rossiter																																																																Paul Dimery																																																																Amy Macdonald																																																																																																																																																																																																														
Coastal South (Note: Whangarei before 2013)	Rod McKay																																																																Craig Brown																																																																Rick Stolwerk																																																																																																																																																																																																																																																																																																																		
Whangārei Urban (Note: Whangarei before 2013)	Joyce Ryan																																																																Briar Snelling																																				Stan Semonoff																																																																John Bain																																																																			Terry Archer																					abolished																																																																																																																																																																																						
Whangārei Central (Note: Whangārei Urban before 2022)																																																																	David Sinclair																																																																Jack Craw																																																																																																																																																																																																																																																																																																																		
Te Raki Māori																																																																	Tui Shortland																																																																																																																																																																																																																																																																																																																																																																																		
Te Raki Māori																																																																	Peter-Lucas Jones																																																																																																																																																																																																																																																																																																																																																																																		

== Demography ==
Northland Region covers 12,507.14 km^{2} (4,829.03 sq mi) and had an estimated population of 201,100 as of June 2025, with a population density of 16 people per km^{2}.

Historical population
Year	Pop.	±% p.a.
1991	126,786	—
1996	137,052	+1.57%
2001	140,133	+0.45%
2006	148,470	+1.16%
2013	151,689	+0.31%
2018	179,076	+3.38%
2023	194,007	+1.61%

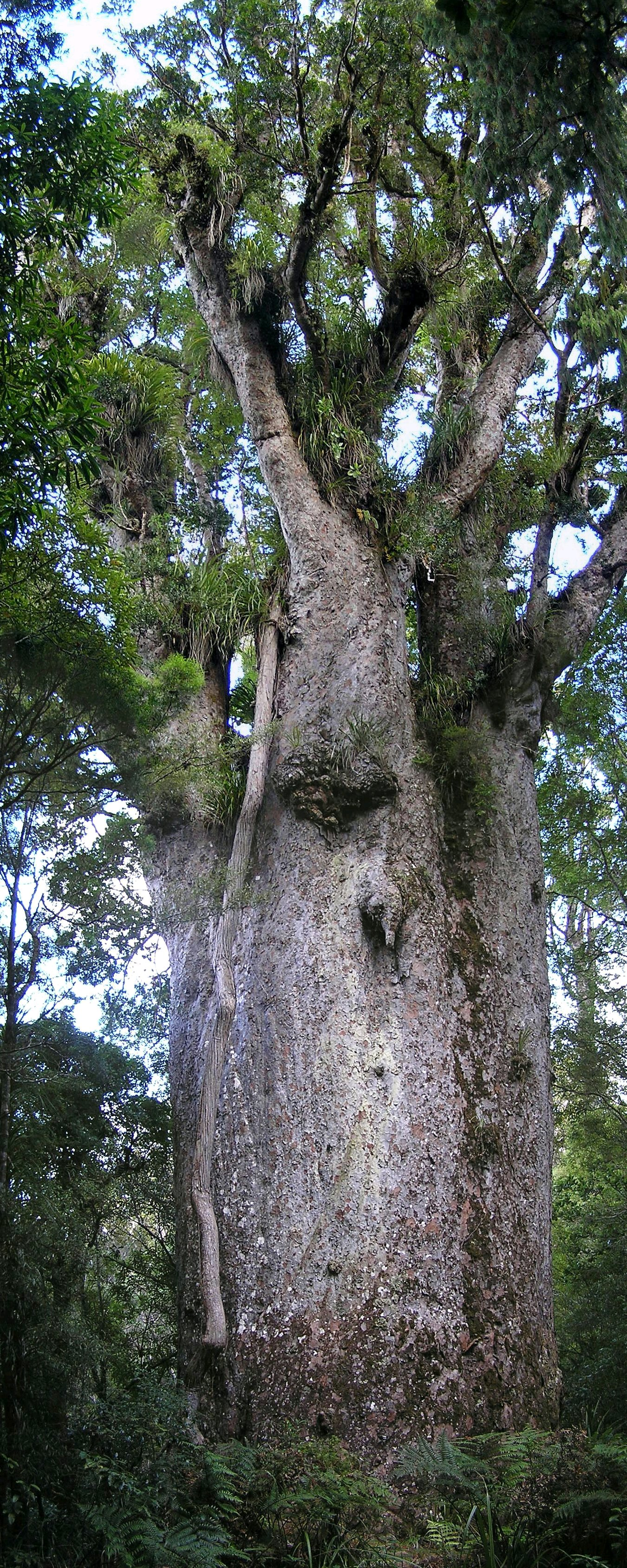
Mature kauri tree (Agathis australis)

Northland Region had a population of 194,007 in the 2023 New Zealand census, an increase of 14,931 people (8.3%) since the 2018 census, and an increase of 42,318 people (27.9%) since the 2013 census. There were 95,697 males, 97,776 females and 528 people of other genders in 71,778 dwellings. 2.4% of people identified as LGBTIQ+. The median age was 43.2 years (compared with 38.1 years nationally). There were 38,067 people (19.6%) aged under 15 years, 29,856 (15.4%) aged 15 to 29, 83,790 (43.2%) aged 30 to 64, and 42,288 (21.8%) aged 65 or older.

People could identify as more than one ethnicity. The results were 73.0% European (Pākehā); 37.4% Māori; 4.9% Pasifika; 4.8% Asian; 0.7% Middle Eastern, Latin American and African New Zealanders (MELAA); and 2.3% other, which includes people giving their ethnicity as "New Zealander". English was spoken by 97.0%, Māori language by 10.1%, Samoan by 0.4% and other languages by 7.1%. No language could be spoken by 1.9% (e.g. too young to talk). New Zealand Sign Language was known by 0.5%. The percentage of people born overseas was 16.9, compared with 28.8% nationally.

Religious affiliations were 31.2% Christian, 0.7% Hindu, 0.2% Islam, 3.8% Māori religious beliefs, 0.5% Buddhist, 0.5% New Age, 0.1% Jewish, and 1.2% other religions. People who answered that they had no religion were 54.2%, and 7.8% of people did not answer the census question.

Of those at least 15 years old, 20,514 (13.2%) people had a bachelor's or higher degree, 87,414 (56.1%) had a post-high school certificate or diploma, and 41,562 (26.7%) people exclusively held high school qualifications. The median income was $33,100, compared with $41,500 nationally. 11,367 people (7.3%) earned over $100,000 compared to 12.1% nationally. The employment status of those at least 15 was that 67,788 (43.5%) people were employed full-time, 21,735 (13.9%) were part-time, and 5,469 (3.5%) were unemployed.

Māori refer to Northland – and by extension its Māori people – as Te Taitokerau (the northern tide) and Māori language and traditions are strong there. Major tribal groups include Ngāpuhi, Te Aupōuri, Te Rarawa, Ngāti Kahu, Ngāti Kurī and Ngāti Whātua. Several of these tribes form a loose association known as the Muriwhenua.

Approximately one third of the region's population are Māori; the majority of the remainder is of European lineage. Compared to the rest of the country, Pacific Islanders are under-represented in Northland. Although most of the region's European population are British (as is true with the rest of the country), certain other ethnicities are represented as well. These include a sizeable Croatian community from the Dargaville area north, particularly around Kaitaia.

Largest groups of overseas-born residents
Nationality	Population (2018)
England	8,607
Australia	3,429
South Africa	1,923
India	1,365
United States	1,059
Philippines	1,014
Netherlands	957
Germany	909
Scotland	804
Fiji	729

=== Urban areas ===
Northland is New Zealand's least urbanised region, with 50% of the population of 201,100 living in urban areas. Whangārei is the largest urban area of Northland, with a population of 56,100 (June 2025). The region's population is largely concentrated along the east coast, due to the west coast being more rugged and less suitable for urbanisation.

Urban area	Population (June 2025)	% of region
Whangārei	56,100	27.9%
Kerikeri	8,380	4.2%
Kaitaia	6,170	3.1%
Dargaville	5,170	2.6%
Kaikohe	4,720	2.3%
One Tree Point	3,350	1.7%
Ruakākā	2,890	1.4%
Mangawhai Heads	2,760	1.4%
Moerewa	1,930	1.0%
Hikurangi	1,640	0.8%
Opua	1,640	0.8%
Paihia	1,640	0.8%
Kawakawa	1,500	0.7%
Waipu	1,450	0.7%
Ngunguru	1,180	0.6%
Haruru	1,210	0.6%

== History ==
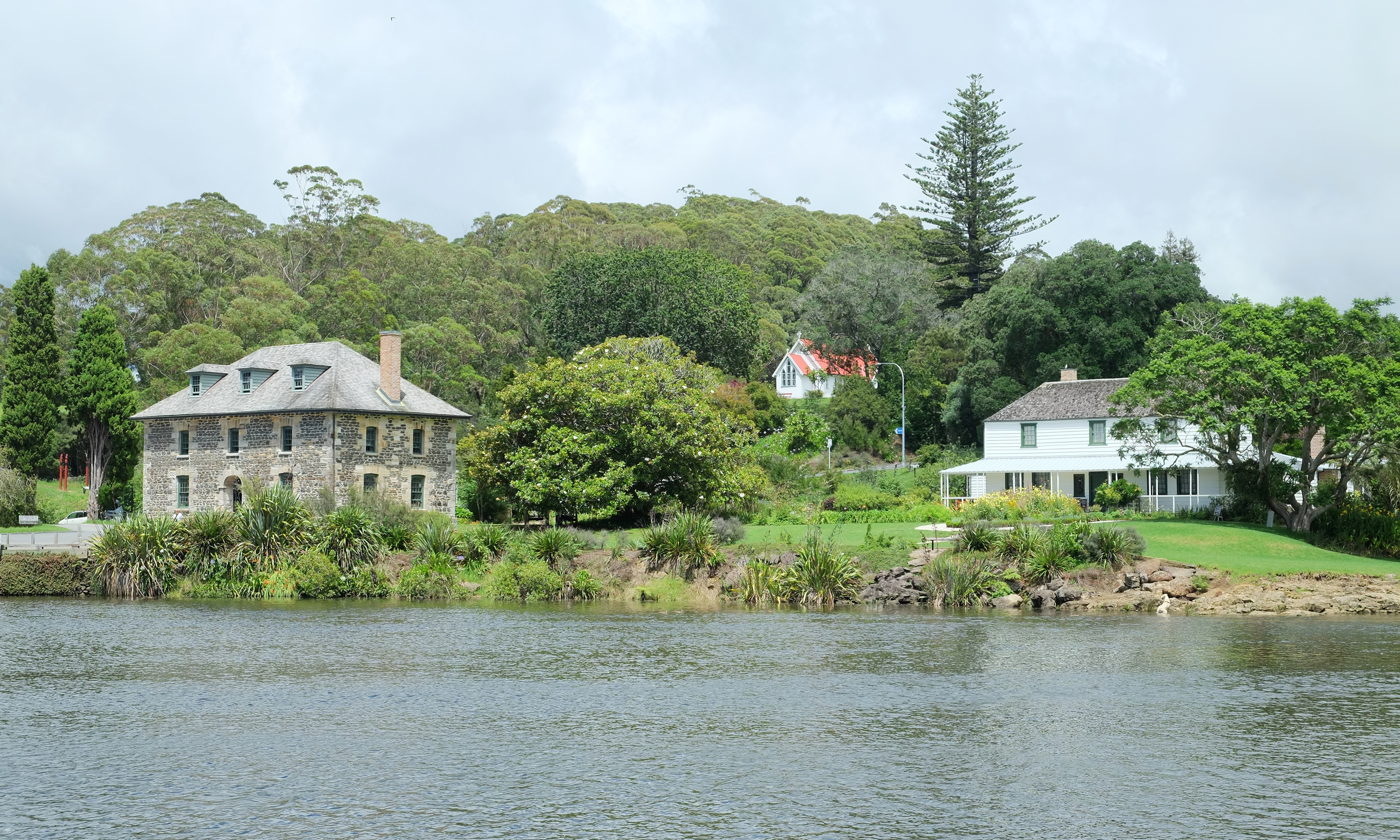
Kerikeri, Bay of Islands. Stone Store (left), St James (rear), and the country's oldest surviving building, Mission House (right).

According to Māori legend, the North Island of New Zealand was an enormous fish, caught by the demigod Māui. For this reason, Northland is sometimes referred to as "The tail of the fish", Te Hiku o Te Ika.

Northland iwi claim that Kupe made landfall at the Hokianga (although others claim this was at Taipa) in the northwest of Northland, and thus the region claims that it was the birthplace of New Zealand. Some of the oldest traces of Māori kāinga (fishing villages) can be found here.

If the Māori regard the region as the legendary birthplace of the country, there can be no doubt that it was the European starting-point for the modern nation of New Zealand. Traders, whalers and sealers were among the first arrivals, and the gum and timber of the mighty kauri trees brought more settlers.

In the Bay of Islands, Russell, formerly known as Kororareka, was the first permanent European settlement and Kerikeri contains many historic buildings, including the Stone Store, New Zealand's oldest extant stone building. The nearby settlement of Waitangi was of even more significance, as the signing place of New Zealand's founding document, the Treaty of Waitangi between the Māori tribes and the British Crown, on 6 February 1840.

Between 1870 and 1920, the major industry in Northland was kauri gum digging, which by the 1910s was centred around the townships of Ahipara and Houhora.

== Economy ==
The subnational gross domestic product (GDP) of Northland was estimated at NZ$7.86 billion in the year to March 2019, 2.6% of New Zealand's national GDP. The regional GDP per capita was estimated at $42,104 in 2019, the lowest of all New Zealand regions. In the year to March 2018, primary industries contributed $984 million (13.1%) to the regional GDP, goods-producing industries contributed $1.59 billion (21.2%), service industries contributed $4.30 billion (57.1%), and taxes and duties contributed $645 million (8.6%)

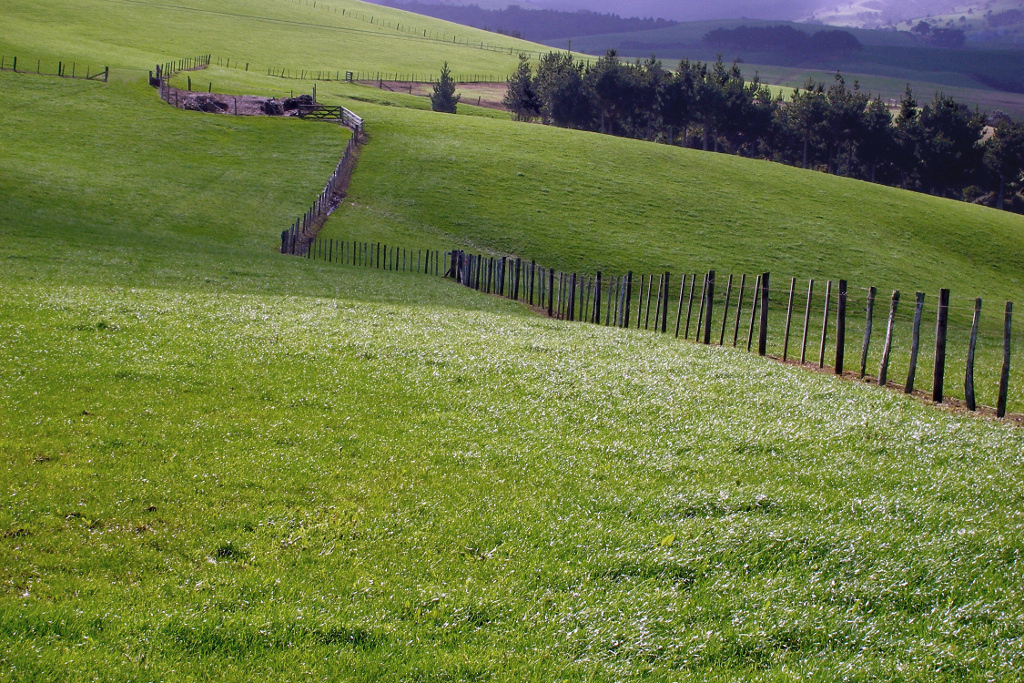
Fence on a sheep farm

The region's economy is based on agriculture (notably beef cattle and sheep), fishing, forestry, and horticulture. Northland has 4,423 hectares (10,930 acres) of horticultural land as of 2017. Significant crops include avocadoes, kumara, kiwifruit, citrus fruit and olives.

Extensive forests are a feature of the Northland landscape. For this reason wood and paper manufacturing industries also make a large contribution to the region's economy. The railway system, which once ran as far north as Okaihau, has been historically important for the transport of timber to Auckland.

Northland is a favourite tourist destination, especially to the Bay of Islands and the historic town of Kerikeri. Diving and fishing are also popular visitor activities, especially around the Bay of Islands and the Poor Knights Islands.

Northland was formerly home to New Zealand's only oil refinery, located in Marsden Point, a town, close to Whangārei across the harbour. New Zealand's natural fuel resources in Taranaki account for a little under half of the refinery's intake, with the rest coming predominantly from the Middle East. The nearby Marsden A thermal power station originally utilised heavy oil from the refinery for electricity production, but no longer does so.
