= Piako County =

Former county in New Zealand

- County of New Zealand
- 1876–1989
- Piako County in 1948
- Area
  - Coordinates: 37.578°S 175.658°E
- Government: Piako County Council
- History
  - Established: 1876
  - Disestablished: 1989
- Subdivisions
  - Type: Ridings
  - Units: Waitoa, Matamata, Taotaoroa, Paterere, Te Aroha (since 1881)
- Today part of: Matamata-Piako District

Piako County was a county in New Zealand in existence from 1876 until the abolishment of counties in 1989. Piako County was located around the Piako River and the lower Thames Valley.

The boundaries changed throughout the existence of the county with the most important change being in 1908 when the southern half was split off to create Matamata County.

== Geography ==
Piako County was bounded to the north by Thames County, Tauranga County to the east, and Waikato County to the west. In 1908 Matamata County was formed from the southern portion of Piako County. Over time the boundaries of the county changed with Tauwhare and Te Miro becoming part of Waikato County and Tahuna becoming part of the county after Piako County absorbed some parts of Ohinemuri and Hauraki Plains counties. By 1975 Piako County had a size of 452 km^{2} (175 sq mi).

== History ==
=== County and council ===
Piako County was established under the 1876 Counties Act. The Piako County Council held its first meeting in Crawford's Store in Morrinsville on 9 January 1877. The county council held meetings in various locations before deciding on Morrinsville in 1887; however, just two months later the council moved meetings to Te Aroha. It then moved back to Morrinsville, holding meetings in the Phoenix Hotel in 1888 before moving to Cambridge (Note: Cambridge is outside the county), where the county office was to be located. In 1890 meetings were moved back to Morrinsville and by 1893 the county council office was moved to Morrinsville. In 1897 the council decided to move the office to Te Aroha, where it would remain indefinitely.

In 1905 land around the Maungatautari Mountain was transferred to Waipa County. The Waitoa, Matamata, and Taotaoroa Road Boards were merged with the county in the first decade of the 20th century. On 25 September 1908 Matamata County was created from the southern half of Piako County.

Piako County and Morrinsville Borough had their boundaries adjusted in 1957, resulting in Piako County losing two areas but gaining one other. On 13 May 1961 the new council offices were officially opened. Located on Kenrick Street, Te Aroha. The old Te Aroha technical school was removed for this and the building cost £57,852 to construct, with the land costing £1,600.

In 1965 the county had 450 miles (720 km) of roading and 2,000 acres (810 ha) of road frontage to maintain. To assist with the maintenance of the frontage the council allowed farmers to graze their stock on the road frontage. In 1972 the council purchased the Te Aroha abattoir from the Te Aroha Borough Council and took over the Te Aroha Abattoir District which extended to Matamata in the south but did not include Morrinsville Borough. In the 1960s the council finished their programme of street lighting with the installation of lights at Waihou and Tatuanui. After this every township in the county had sodium vapour lighting.

As part of the 1989 local government reforms all counties were abolished.

=== Farming ===
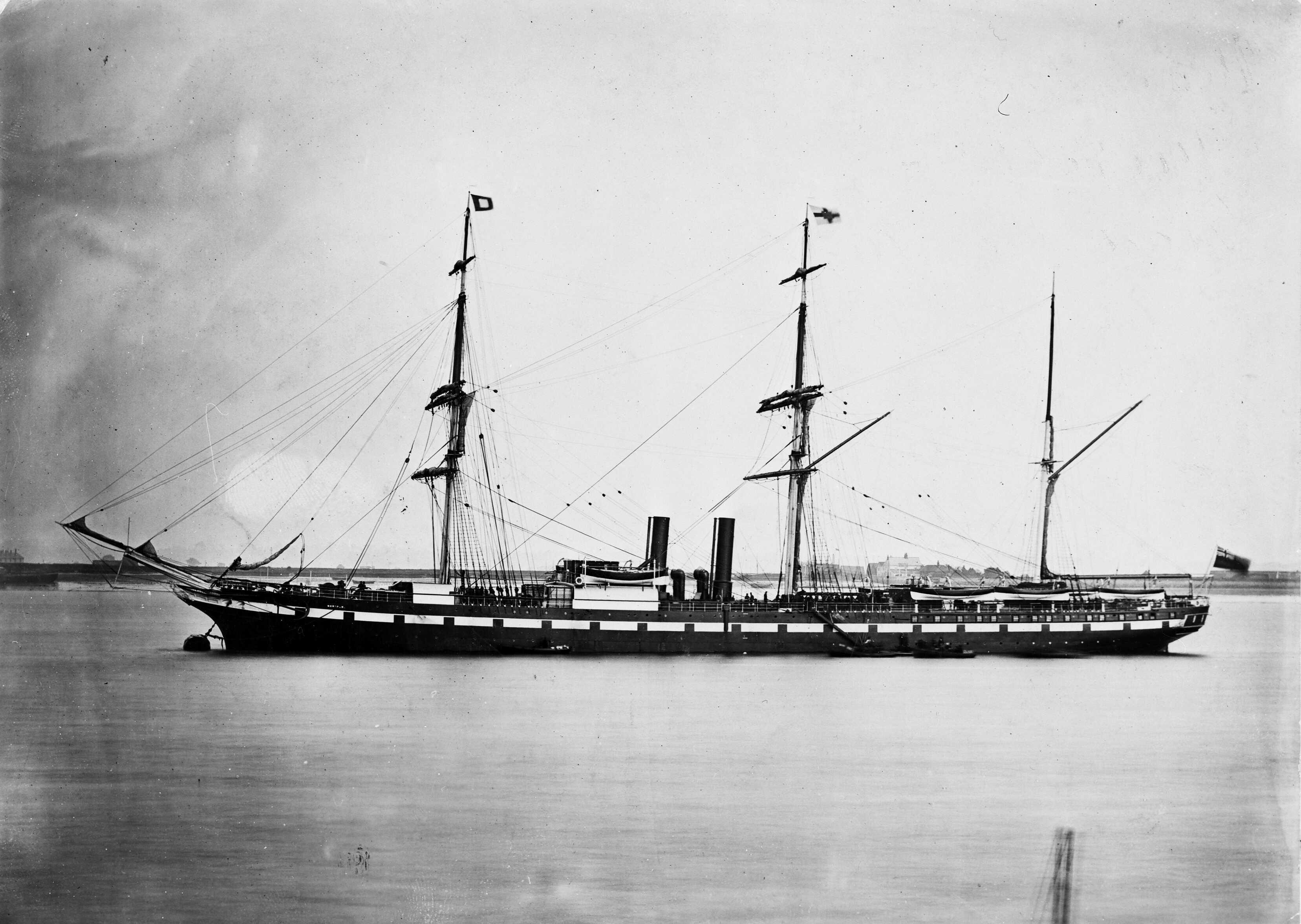
The Norfolk

The area between Morrinsville, Matamata, and Te Aroha is prime farmland and the area is one of the wealthiest farming areas globally. The area itself is commonly used for dairy cattle due to the terrain. In the 1860s–1870s swamps and bush in the county were burnt off but soils were deficient in phosphate and the original farms were not profitable with government intervention being required to save many of the estates. In the 20th century the dairy industry started to grow and many of the farms in the area converted to dairy cattle. Julius Vogel had helped tenant farmers from Lincolnshire settle the area in the 1880s. These settlers came over on the Norfolk.

In 1879 the county had 5,298 head of sheep. By 1883 this had increased to 20,495 and in 1894 there were 224,264 head of sheep.

== Ridings ==
Piako County was originally divided into four ridings: Waitoa, Matamata, Taotaoroa, and Patetere. Each riding elected two members. By 1881 Te Aroha riding having been constituted, along with one extra member for the council. In 1900, Waitoa elected three members, Te Aroha and Patetere two members each, and Matamata and Taotaoroa just one member each. In 1905 this was changed again to give Te Aroha just one member and Waitoa four. In 1922 the county annexed the Tahuna Riding of Hauraki Plains County increasing the number of ridings to six.

== Associated entities ==
The Piako County Rabbit Board (changed to the Piako County Pest Destruction Board in 1972) was responsible for pest control in the county and instituted a bounty scheme to help with pest culling.

== Demographics ==
In 1878 Piako County had a population of 447 with 69 dwellings. By 1881 this had more than doubled to 982 and 168 dwellings. In 1886 the population reached 2,320, more than half of those within the Te Aroha riding. By 1891, it had increased to 2,517. In 1908 the population reached 4,870. Piako County, not including town districts and boroughs, had a population of 7,900 in 1928, 10,600 in 1938, 11,550 in 1948, and 12,400 in 1958. By 1973 the population had decreased to 11,300. In 1901 Piako County had a population of 2,432.

== Notable residents ==
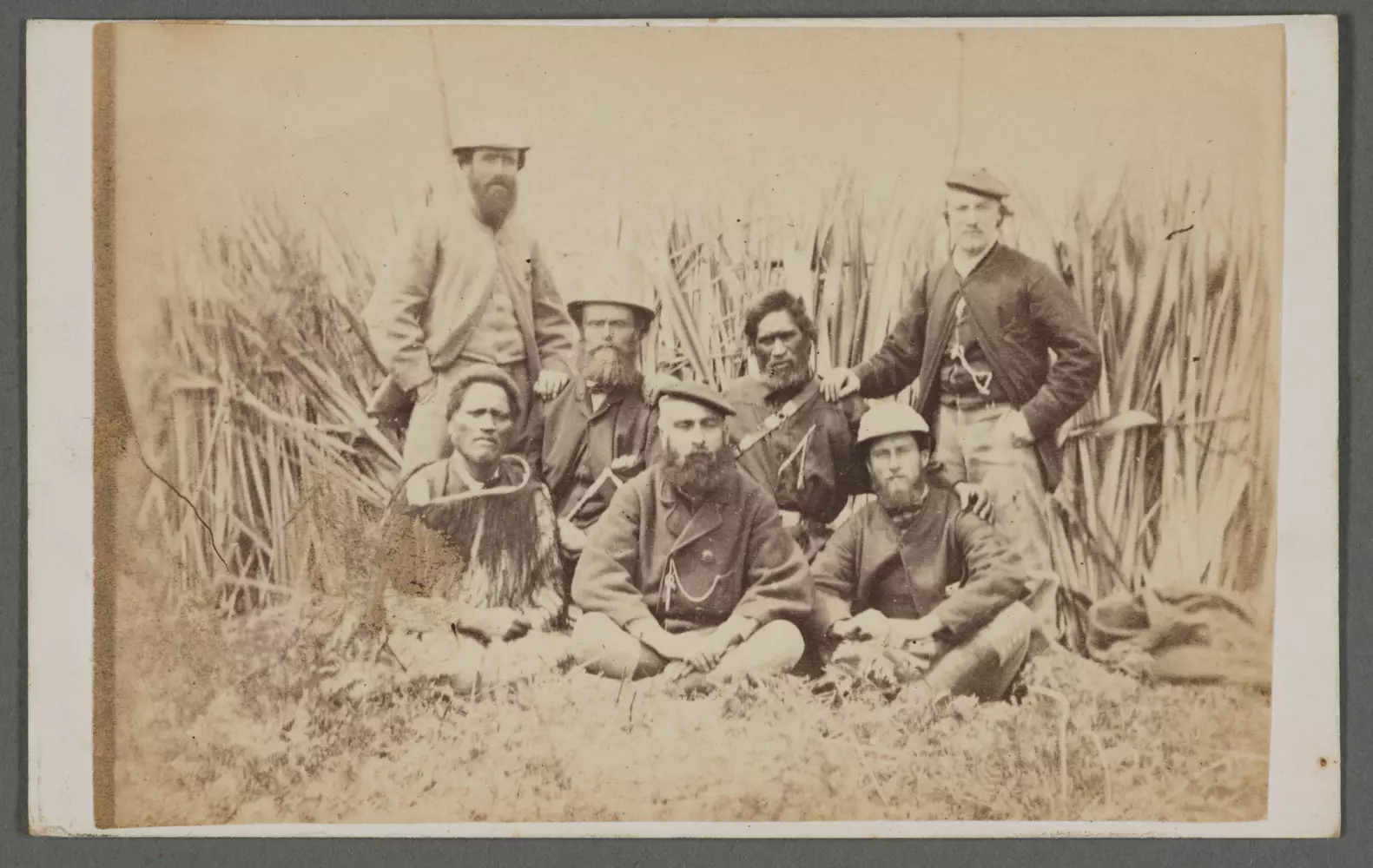
Photo of seven men on the bank of the River Thames including Josiah Firth and Campbell Williams

- Josiah Clifton Firth established a 55,000 acres (22,000 ha) estate in Matamata as one of the first settlers in the area.
- William Herries had a farm at Shaftesbury and served as a member of the Piako County Council for 8 years. He later served as MP for Bay of Plenty and Tauranga and was popular in his district.
- William Louis Campbell Williams was born on 18 January 1842, on the Louisa Campbell as she sailed for New Zealand. In New Zealand Williams worked on Firth's estate before serving as chairman of the Piako County Council from 1884–1887. He died in Cambridge, 1931.
- Nichol Asthon Larney was born near Edinburgh in 1842. In 1861 Larney went to the United States and enlisted in the Union Army in the engineer army corps and served for 4 years before returning to Scotland. In Scotland, he learnt veterinary medicine before he arrived in Auckland in 1875 on the British Empire. He managed an estate at Ohaupo and then another at Waitoa before purchasing his own estate at Tatuanui, which he named Lauriston. He served two years on the Piako County Council for the Riding of Waitoa and was known as Colonel Larney. Larney also established an anthelmintic company. Larney built a homestead he named Comley Green where he lived from 1911 until his death on 11 June 1915, at the age of 73.
- William Philip Chepmell was born in Sandhurst, Berkshire in 1842. Chepmell arrived in New Zealand in 1861. He had an estate of 685 acres (277 ha) known as Wairama. Chepmell served as chairman of Piako County Council three times from 1887 to 1905 and 1914, was a member of the Waitoa Road Board, Waikato Hospital Board, and the Charitable Aid Board.
- William Shepherd Allen an English MP who settled at an estate he named Annandale near Morrinsville. He served as MP for Te Aroha for a year before he was removed based on an irregularity. He served on the Piako County Council for a year before retiring and returning to England.
- Sir Alfred Hayward was from Kereone and received the CBE in 1960 for his services to the dairy industry.
- W. R. G. Johnson was the engineer for the Piako County Council before later serving as an engineer to the Waitoa, Waihekau, Elstow, and Hungahunga Drainage Boards. He was responsible for the drainage of the Waitoa Block, which contained 30,000 acres (12,000 ha) of swamp. Areas drained includes Tatuanui, Springdale, and Te Puninga. Johnson was president of the Piako Rugby Union and a breeder of racehorses. He died in 1959 at age 84.
- William Percy Gage-Brown was a member of the Piako County Council from 1893 to 1895 and one of the earliest settlers at Shaftesbury holding 540 acres (220 ha) freehold land.

== Reserves ==
In 1975 Piako County had 19 reserves: Tahuna Recreation Reserve, Mangaiti Reserve, Waihou Recreation Reserve, Spring Recreation Reserve, Roy Scott Recreation Reserve, Kuranui Reserve, Tahuroa Reserve, Matamata Aerodrome, Walton Recreation Reserve, Te Tapui Scenic Reserve, and Wairere Falls Scenic Reserve.
