= Kowai County =

Former county of New Zealand

Coordinates: 43°12′35″S 172°41′44″E

- County of New Zealand
- 1912–1968
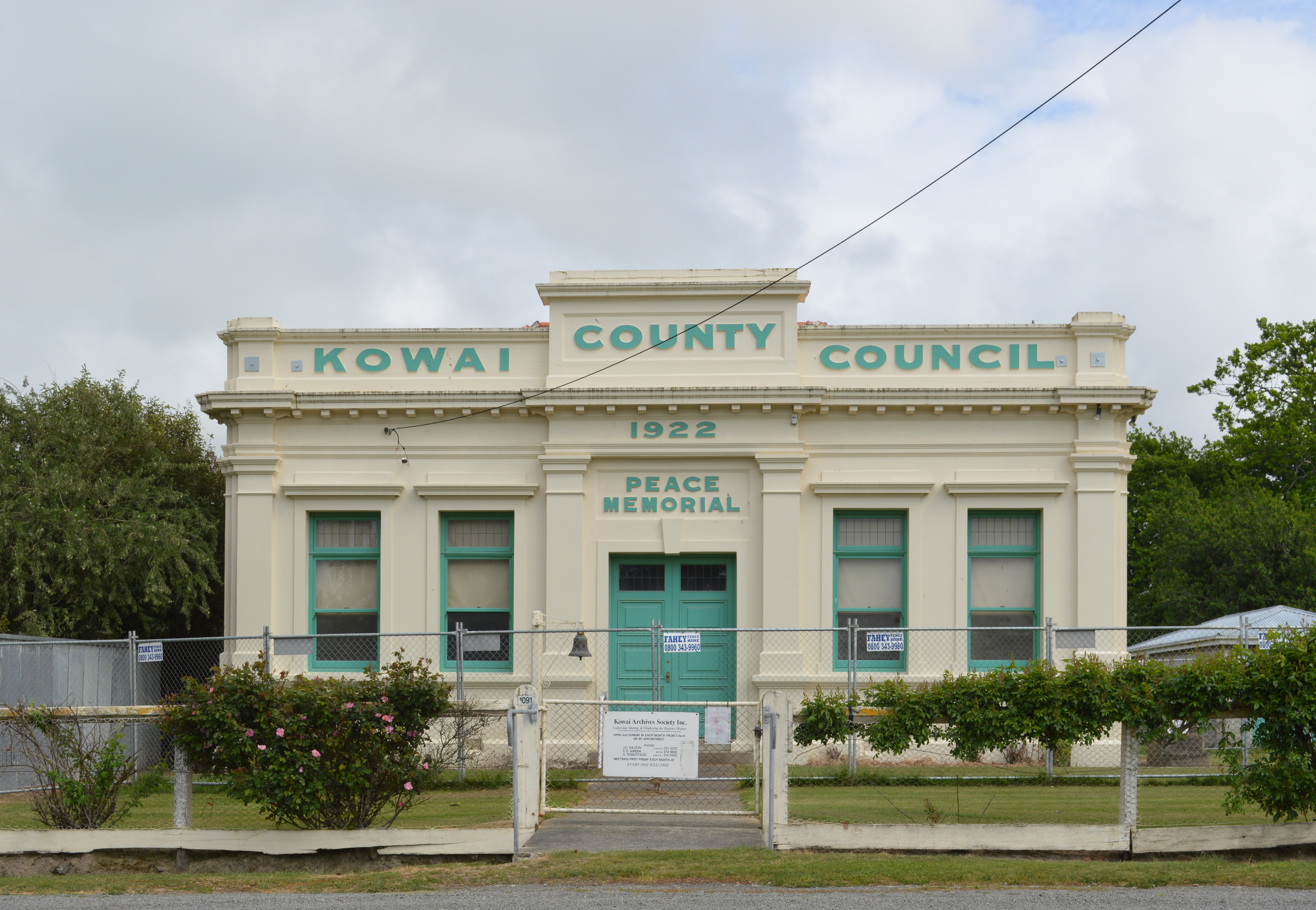
- Kowai County Council Building in 2013
- Capital: Balcairn
- History
  - Established: 1912
  - Disestablished: 1968
- Today part of: Hurunui District

Kowai County was one of the counties of New Zealand in the South Island. It lay between the Ashley River / Rakahuri and Waipara Rivers, the sea and Mount Grey/Maukatere.

Local government in the area began in 1864, when the Provincial Council gave Road Boards responsibility for roads, drainage and development and the power to levy rates. Ashley County extended from the Waimakariri River to the Hurunui River was subdivided into 8 ridings, first elected on 22 December 1876 for Oxford, Cust, Kowai, Mandeville (2), Waipara, Mount Thomas, West Eyreton and Eyreton. The county had few powers and left local administration to the Road Boards.

The Ashley Subdivision, and the Waimakariri-Ashley Water-supply Board Act, 1911, replaced 7 road districts with Rangiora County, Eyre County, Oxford County, Kowai County (replacing Kowai Road District, which was formed in 1864), and Ashley County, gazetted in March 1912, with elections for Kowai on 24 April, having 3 councillors from each of North and South Ridings, and its first meeting at its Balcairn headquarters on 27 April 1912. Amberley Town Board was absorbed by Kowai County in 1926 and became another riding, with one councillor.

In 1968 over 15% of Kowai residents asked for a poll about merging again with Ashley County. The poll was won by 441 to 207, out of 1,662 electors.

The County office was designed by England Bros, architects, built by Mr F. E. Shaw, Christchurch for £1,963 2s, and officially opened on 5 October 1923. It is of reinforced concrete, with a tiled roof, the vestibule is 16 ft (4.9 m) x 10 ft (3.0 m); 2 offices are each 21 ft (6.4 m) square and the Council room is 22 ft (6.7 m) x 17 ft (5.2 m), with figured rimu panels and an ornate plaster ceiling. The office was used until 1977 when Waipara County joined with Ashley County to become Hurunui County and the headquarters moved to Amberley. The building was restored, after 2011 earthquake damage, in 2020 and is a Category II Historic Site.

== See also ==
- List of former territorial authorities in New Zealand § Counties
