= Waipara County =

Former county of New Zealand

Coordinates: 43°03′21″S 172°45′32″E

- County of New Zealand
- 1909–1977
- Capital: Waikari
- History
  - Established: 1909
  - Disestablished: 1977
- Today part of: Hurunui District

Waipara County was one of the counties of New Zealand in the South Island. It lay between the Waipara and Hurunui Rivers.

Local government in the area began in 1864, when the Provincial Council gave Road Boards responsibility for roads, drainage and development and the power to levy rates. Ashley County extended from the Waimakariri River to the Hurunui River was subdivided into 8 ridings, first elected on 22 December 1876 for Oxford, Cust, Kowai, Mandeville (2), Waipara, Mount Thomas, West Eyreton and Eyreton. The county had few powers and left local administration to the Road Boards.

The Waipara Road District became the County under the Waipara County Act, 1909. It set the boundaries as Harper Pass, Hurunui River, Pacific Ocean, Waipara River and its South Branch to its source, Block Hill, Ashley Head, Esk Head, the Dampier Range and Harper Pass.

The County office was in the former Roads Board office at Waikari. It was used until 1977 when Waipara County joined with Ashley County to become Hurunui County and the headquarters moved to Amberley.

== See also ==
- List of former territorial authorities in New Zealand § Counties
