= Southland Center (disambiguation) =

Southland Center can refer to:

- Southland Center, a former name of Sheraton Dallas Hotel
- Southland Center (Illinois), sports venue in Lynwood, Illinois
- Southland Center (Michigan), a shopping center in Michigan
- Westfield Southland, a retail complex in Cheltenham, Victoria, Australia

== See also ==
- Southland (disambiguation)
