= Thames County, New Zealand =

Former county of New Zealand

Coordinates: 37°08′17″S 175°32′34″E

Thames County
- County of New Zealand
- 1877–1975
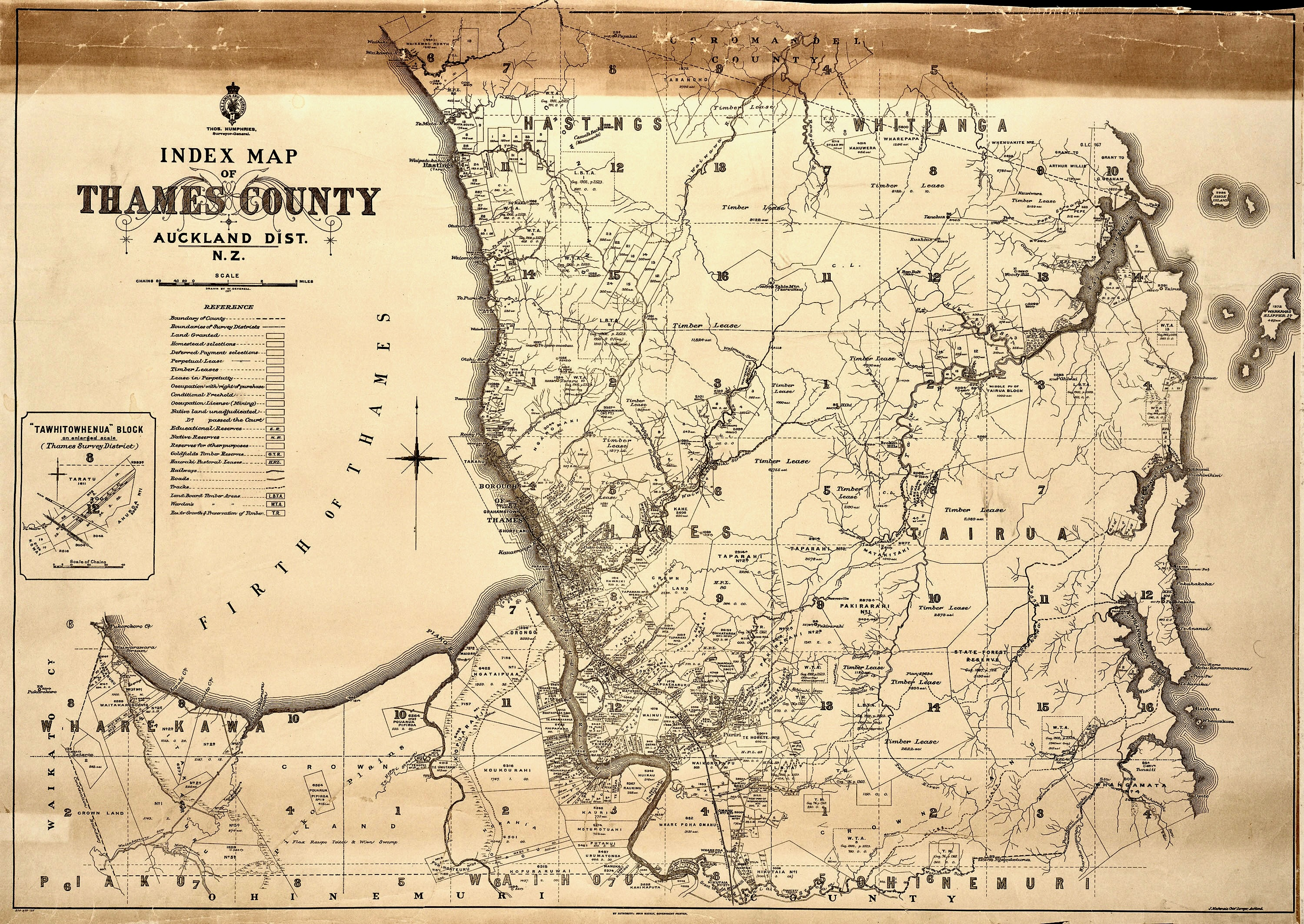
- 1907 map
- Capital: Thames
- History
  - Established: 1877
  - Disestablished: 1975
- Today part of: Thames-Coromandel District Council

Thames County was one of the counties of New Zealand on the North Island.

Thames County was formed on 9 January 1877 with 5 ridings, Ohinemuri and Waiotaui with 2 councillors each and Hastings, Parawai, and Kauwaeranga with 1 councillor each. Ohinemuri County was formed from a portion of Thames County in 1885. The County Chambers were on Mary Street, Thames.

Thames Borough, Thames County and Coromandel County joined to form Thames-Coromandel District from 1 October 1975.

== See also ==
- List of former territorial authorities in New Zealand § Counties
