= Hokianga County =

- County of New Zealand
- 1876–1989
- Capital: Rawene
- Area
  - Coordinates: 35.53°S 173.38°E
- History
  - Established: 1876
  - Disestablished: 1989
- Today part of: Far North District

Hokianga County was one of the counties of New Zealand in the North Island, from 1876 until 1989. It came into existence in November 1876, when the provinces were abolished. The county seat was at Rawene. In the 1989 local government reforms, Hokianga County amalgamated with Bay of Islands County, Kaikohe Borough, Kaitaia Borough, Mangonui County and Whangaroa County to form the Far North District.

== See also ==
- List of former territorial authorities in New Zealand § Counties
