= Ohinemuri =

Ohinemuri may refer to the following in New Zealand:

- Ohinemuri (New Zealand electorate), former general electorate (1896–1928)
- Ohinemuri County, former county (1885–1989)
- Ohinemuri River, river with a source close to the mining town of Waihi
