= Weber County =

Weber County may refer to:

- Weber County, Utah, United States
- Weber County, New Zealand
