= Counties of New Zealand =

Former administrative subdivision of New Zealand

County
- Map of county boundaries on the date of their creation, 1 November 1876
- Location: New Zealand
- Created by: Counties Act 1876
- Created: 1 November 1876
- Abolished: 1 November 1989 (Note: Chatham Islands County was abolished in 1995, most were abolished following the 1989 reforms to local government.)
- Government: County council

The counties of New Zealand were the administrative divisions representing the country's rural areas, existing from the abolition of the provinces in 1876 until the major local government reforms of 1989. They were governed by county councils and existed alongside the country's boroughs, town districts, and other administrative divisions.

== History ==
From 1853 until 1876, New Zealand had a semi-federal system of provinces. Each province had its own legislature and superintendent. These provinces set up their own local boards and councils. The provinces were abolished on 1 November 1876, following the passage of the Abolition of the Provinces Act 1876.

The original Counties Bill intended to merge 314 road boards into 39 counties; however, as a result of lobbying, the final Counties Act 1876 as passed created 63 counties. The counties established by the Act were found to be too small; they could not effectively provide the expected services and mainly continued on the construction and maintenance of rural roads as the pre-existing road boards had done. Many ad hoc bodies were created to manage services such as education, health, water, and ports over the succeeding decades.

As of 1966, it was no longer possible to create new counties except for the merger of pre-existing counties. Counties at that point could create county towns, subordinate to the county, in areas with at least 200 people or 60 dwellings. There were 117 counties in 1966, with all but two having county councils; two remained without government as they were sparsely populated.

The Local Government Act 1974 sought to rationalise local government, attempting to tackle the problem whilst dealing with staunchly independent local authorities. The Act abolished the distinction between boroughs and counties, and allowed for the creation of regional units of government. The Act also increased the powers of the Local Government Commission.

All counties bar one were abolished following the Fourth Labour Government's 1989 reforms to local government, which consolidated around 850 local government bodies into just 86. The exception was Chatham Islands County, which was abolished on 1 November 1995 following the passing of the Chatham Islands Council Act 1995, which transitioned the islands governance to a sui generis territorial authority.

== Powers and responsibilities ==
County councils mainly concerned themselves with providing roads and controlling rivers and other waterways. These services were paid for by rates on property and government loans and subsidies.

Many small counties struggled to maintain roads to an acceptable standard; in 1922 a Main Highways Board (NHB) was set up that would oversee roads across the country. In 1937, almost 6,500 km of highways were designated "state highways", with control being moved to the NHB over the counties.

== Elections ==
The first elections for the county councils were to be held on 22 December 1876.

== List of counties ==
County	Established	Abolished	Existed for	Successor
Mangonui County (Note: Initially spelt "Mongonui")	1 November 1876	1 November 1989	113 years	Far North District
Whangaroa County	1 January 1887	1 November 1989	102 years	Far North District
Hokianga County	1 November 1876	1 November 1989	113 years	Far North District
Bay of Islands County	1 November 1876	1 November 1989	113 years	Far North District
Whangarei County	1 November 1876	1 November 1989	113 years	Whangarei District
Hobson County	1 November 1876	1 November 1989	113 years	Kaipara District
Otamatea County	1 January 1887	1 November 1989	102 years	Whangarei District; Kaipara District
Rodney County	1 November 1876	1 November 1989	113 years	Kaipara District; Rodney District
Waitemata County	1 November 1876	1 August 1974	97 years	Waitemata City; Takapuna City; Rodney County
Eden County	1 November 1876	1 April 1956	79 years	Auckland City
Waiheke County	1 April 1970	1 November 1989	19 years	new Auckland City
Great Barrier Island County	7 November 1912	1 November 1989	76 years	new Auckland City
Manukau County	1 November 1876	3 September 1965	88 years	Manukau City
Franklin County	1 April 1912	1 November 1989	77 years	Papakura District; Franklin District
Coromandel County	1 November 1876	1 October 1975	98 years	Thames-Coromandel District
Thames County	1 November 1876	1 October 1975	98 years	Thames-Coromandel District
Raglan County	1 November 1876	1 November 1989	113 years	Franklin District; Waipa District; Waikato District
Waikato County	1 November 1876	1 November 1989	113 years	new Hamilton City; Waipa District; Waikato District; Matamata-Piako District
Hauraki Plains County	1 April 1912	1 November 1989	77 years	Hauraki District
Ohinemuri County	8 September 1885	1 November 1989	104 years	Hauraki District; Matamata-Piako District; Western Bay of Plenty District
Piako County	1 November 1876	1 November 1989	113 years	Matamata-Piako District
Waipa County	1 November 1876	1 November 1989	113 years	Waikato District new Hamilton City; South Waikato District; Waipa District
Matamata County	25 September 1908	1 November 1989	81 years	Matamata-Piako District; South Waikato District; Waipa District; Western Bay of Plenty District; Rotorua District; Taupo District
Waitomo County	1 April 1905	1 April 1976	71 years	Waitomo District
Awakino County	1 April 1904	1 April 1922	18 years	Waitomo County
Taupo County	1 April 1922	1 December 1988	66 years	Taupo District
West Taupo County	1 November 1876	1 April 1922	45 years	Taupo County
East Taupo County	1 November 1876	1 April 1922	45 years	Taupo County
Tauranga County	1 November 1876	1 November 1989	113 years	Hauraki District; Tauranga District; Western Bay of Plenty District
Matakaoa County	1 April 1920	1 April 1965	45 years	Waiapu County
Opotiki County	1 November 1899	1 November 1986	87 years	Opotiki District
Rotorua County	1 January 1887	1 April 1979	92 years	Rotorua District
Kawhia County	1 November 1876	31 March 1956	79 years	Otorohanga County
Whakatane County	1 November 1876	1 April 1976	99 years	Whakatane District
Waiapu County	1 October 1890	1 November 1989	99 years	Gisborne District
Waikohu County	10 October 1908	1 November 1989	81 years	Gisborne District
Uawa County	10 December 1918	1 April 1964	45 years	Cook County
Cook County	1 November 1876	1 November 1989	113 years	Gisborne District
Wairoa County	1 November 1876	1 October 1986	109 years	Wairoa District
Hawke's Bay County	1 November 1876	1 November 1989	113 years	Hastings District new Napier City
Waipawa County	1 November 1876	1 April 1978	101 years	Waipawa District
Waipukurau County	1 April 1908	1 April 1977	69 years	Waipukurau District
Patangata County	8 September 1885	1 July 1974	88 years	Waipukurau County
Clifton County	6 January 1885	1 November 1989	104 years	Waitomo District; New Plymouth District
Egmont County	1 April 1902	1 November 1989	87 years	South Taranaki District
Taranaki County	1 November 1876	1 October 1986	109 years	North Taranaki District
Whangamomona County	9 November 1907	2 November 1955	47 years	Stratford County
Inglewood County	1 April 1920	11 October 1986	66 years	Inglewood District
Kaitieke County	3 December 1910	8 August 1956	45 years	Taumarunui County
Stratford County	10 September 1890	1 April 1989	98 years	Stratford District
Waimate West County	10 October 1908	1 October 1987	78 years	Waimate Plains District
Eltham County	29 October 1906	15 October 1986	79 years	Eltham District
Hawera County	28 July 1881	1 October 1978	97 years	Hawera District
Patea County	1 November 1876	1 April 1987	110 years	Patea District
Waitotara County	26 February 1884	1 April 1988	104 years	Wanganui County
Ohura County	10 October 1908	8 August 1956	47 years	Taumarunui County
Taumarunui County	1 April 1922	1 November 1989	67 years	Stratford District; Waitomo District; Ruapehu District; Taupo District
Otorohanga County	1 April 1922	1 April 1979	57 years	Otorohanga District
Waimarino County	2 October 1902	1 April 1988	85 years	Waimarino District
Rangitikei County	1 November 1876	1 November 1989	113 years	Rangitikei District Hastings District; Ruapehu District
Manawatu County	1 November 1876	1 April 1988	111 years	Manawatu District
Kairanga County	1 April 1902	1 April 1988	86 years	Manawatu District
Oroua County	1 July 1883	1 November 1989	106 years	Manawatu District new Palmerston North City
Kiwitea County	2 September 1893	1 November 1989	96 years	Rangitikei District; Manawatu District
Pohangina County	1 October 1894	1 November 1989	95 years	Manawatu District
Wanganui County	1 November 1876	1 November 1989	113 years	South Taranaki District; Wanganui District
Woodville County	24 August 1901	5 May 1989	87 years	Woodville District
Dannevirke County	1 April 1908	28 April 1987	79 years	Dannevirke District
Weber County	2 October 1902	1 April 1956	53 years	Dannevirke County
Pahiatua County	1 October 1888	1 November 1989	101 years	Tararua District
Eketahuna County	5 November 1898	1 November 1989	90 years	Tararua District; Masterton District
Akitio County	5 November 1898	1 April 1976	77 years	Dannevirke County
Mauriceville County	7 October 1899	12 May 1965	65 years	Masterton County
Castlepoint County	20 October 1900	1 April 1958	57 years	Masterton County
Horowhenua County	16 December 1884	1 November 1989	104 years	Horowhenua District; Kapiti Coast District
Hutt County	1 November 1876	1 November 1988	112 years	Porirua City; Upper Hutt City; Wainuiomata District
Makara County	23 November 1907	31 August 1962	54 years	Porirua City; Hutt County
Masterton County	20 October 1900	1 April 1989	88 years	Masterton District
Wairarapa North County (Note: Wairarapa East County before 1 January 1887)	1 November 1876	20 October 1900	24 years	Castlepoint County
Wairarapa South County (Note: Wairarapa West County before 1 January 1887)	1 November 1876	1 April 1989	112 years	Carterton District
Featherston County	2 November 1901	1 November 1989	87 years	South Wairarapa District
Sounds County	1 November 1876	4 August 1965	88 years	Marlborough County
Golden Bay County	8 October 1956	1 November 1989	33 years	Tasman District
Waimea County	1 November 1876	1 April 1988	112 years	Tasman District
Collingwood County	1 November 1876	8 October 1956	79 years	Golden Bay County
Takaka County	1 April 1904	8 October 1956	52 years	Golden Bay County
Marlborough County	1 November 1876	1 November 1989	113 years	new Nelson City; Marlborough District
Awatere County	1 April 1912	1 April 1976	64 years	Marlborough County
Kaikoura County	1 November 1876	1 November 1989	113 years	Kaikoura District; Hurunui District
Grey County	1 November 1876	1 November 1989	113 years	Buller District; Grey District
Buller County	1 November 1876	1 November 1989	113 years	Buller District
Murchison County	1 April 1909	31 March 1965	55 years	Waimea County
Inangahua County	1 November 1876	1 November 1989	113 years	Buller District
Westland County	1 November 1876	1 November 1989	113 years	Westland District; Southland District
Amuri County	1 November 1876	1 November 1989	113 years	Marlborough District; Kaikoura District; Hurunui District
Cheviot County	1 November 1876	1 November 1989	113 years	Hurunui District
Hurunui County	2 May 1977	1 November 1989	12 years	Hurunui District; Waimakariri District
Oxford County	1 April 1912	1 November 1989	77 years	Waimakariri District
Ashley County	1 November 1876	2 May 1977	100 years	Hurunui County
Waipara County	24 December 1909	2 May 1977	67 years	Hurunui County
Kowai County	1 April 1912	1 May 1968	56 years	Ashley County
Eyre County	1 April 1912	1 April 1989	77 years	Rangiora District
Rangiora County	1 April 1912	23 June 1978	66 years	Rangiora District
Heathcote County	1 April 1911	1 November 1989	78 years	new Christchurch City
Waimairi County	3 December 1909	1 April 1982	72 years	Waimairi District
Halswell County	1 April 1911	1 April 1968	57 years	Paparua County
Mount Herbert County	2 October 1902	1 November 1989	87 years	Banks Peninsula District
Wairewa County	24 December 1909	1 November 1989	79 years	Banks Peninsula District
Paparua County	1 April 1911	1 November 1989	78 years	Selwyn District new Christchurch City
Akaroa County	1 November 1876	1 November 1989	113 years	Banks Peninsula District
Malvern County	1 April 1911	1 November 1989	78 years	Selwyn District
Ellesmere County	1 April 1911	1 November 1989	78 years	Selwyn District
Springs County	1 April 1911	2 April 1963	52 years	Ellesmere County
Selwyn County	1 November 1876	1 April 1963	87 years	Malvern County
Tawera County	24 December 1909	1 April 1967	57 years	Malvern County
Ashburton County	1 November 1876	1 November 1989	113 years	Ashburton District
Strathallan County	1 September 1974	1 November 1989	15 years	Timaru District
Mackenzie County	4 October 1883	1 November 1989	106 years	Mackenzie District
Geraldine County	1 November 1876	1 September 1974	97 years	Strathallan County
Levels County	31 August 1894	1 September 1974	80 years	Strathallan County
Waimate County	1 November 1876	1 April 1989	113 years	Waimate District
Waitaki County	1 November 1876	1 November 1989	113 years	Waitaki District
Vincent County	1 November 1876	1 November 1989	113 years	Queenstown-Lakes District; Southland District; Central Otago District
Maniototo County	1 November 1876	1 November 1989	113 years	Central Otago District new Dunedin City
Waihemo County	26 June 1882	1 November 1989	107 years	Waitaki District new Dunedin City
Waikouaiti County	1 November 1876	8 October 1977	100 years	Silverpeaks County
Silverpeaks County	8 October 1977	1 November 1989	12 years	new Dunedin City.
Taieri County	1 November 1876	8 October 1977	100 years	Silverpeaks County
Peninsula County	1 November 1876	1 August 1968	91 years	Dunedin City
Tuapeka County	1 November 1876	1 November 1989	113 years	Central Otago District; Clutha District
Clutha County	1 November 1876	1 November 1989	113 years	Clutha District; Southland District
Bruce County	1 November 1876	17 October 1986	110 years	Bruce District
Lake County	1 November 1876	16 October 1986	110 years	Queenstown-Lakes District
Fiord County	1 November 1876	1 October 1981	104 years	Wallace County
Southland County	1 November 1876	1 November 1989	113 years	Southland District; Queenstown-Lakes District; Clutha District; Gore District; Invercargill District; Central Otago District
Wallace County	1 November 1876	1 November 1989	113 years	Central Otago District; Southland District
Stewart Island County	1 November 1876	1 November 1989	113 years	Southland District
Chatham Islands County	8 November 1901	1 November 1995	93 years	Chatham Islands Territory
