= Southlander (disambiguation) =

Southlander is a 2001 American independent film by Steve Hanft and Ross Harris.

Southlander may also refer to:

- Southlanders, people of the Southland, New Zealand
- The Southlanders, Jamaican-British band 1950s onwards

== See also ==
- Southland (disambiguation)
