= Mongonui =

Mongonui may refer to:

- Mangōnui, New Zealand settlement in Northland which used to be called Mongonui
- Mongonui (New Zealand electorate), the electoral district under that name
- Newstead railway station, a former railway station previously named Mongonui in Waikato, New Zealand

== See also ==
- Mangonui County, formerly known as Mongonui County
- Mongonui and Bay of Islands (New Zealand electorate), another electoral district using the name
