= Ashley County =

Ashley County may refer to:

- Ashley County, Arkansas, a county in Arkansas
- Ashley County, New Zealand, a county on the South Island of New Zealand
- Ashley County, Missouri, the former name of Texas County, Missouri, from 1843 to 1845
