= Waimairi County =

Former county of New Zealand

Coordinates: 43°29′34″S 172°36′38″E

- County of New Zealand
- 1909–1982
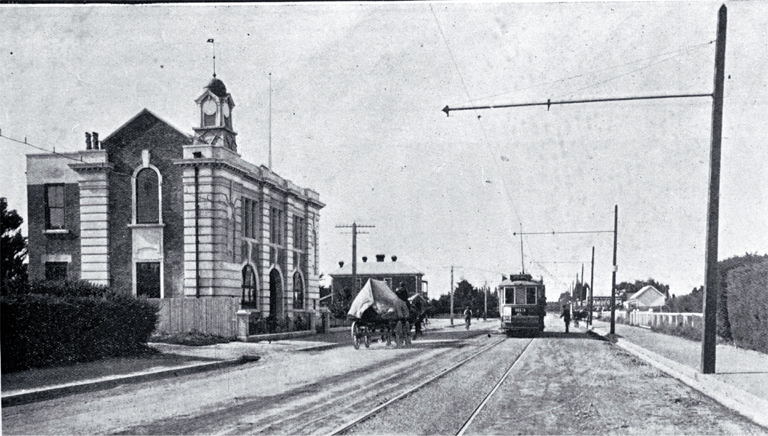
- Waimairi County offices, probably about 1914

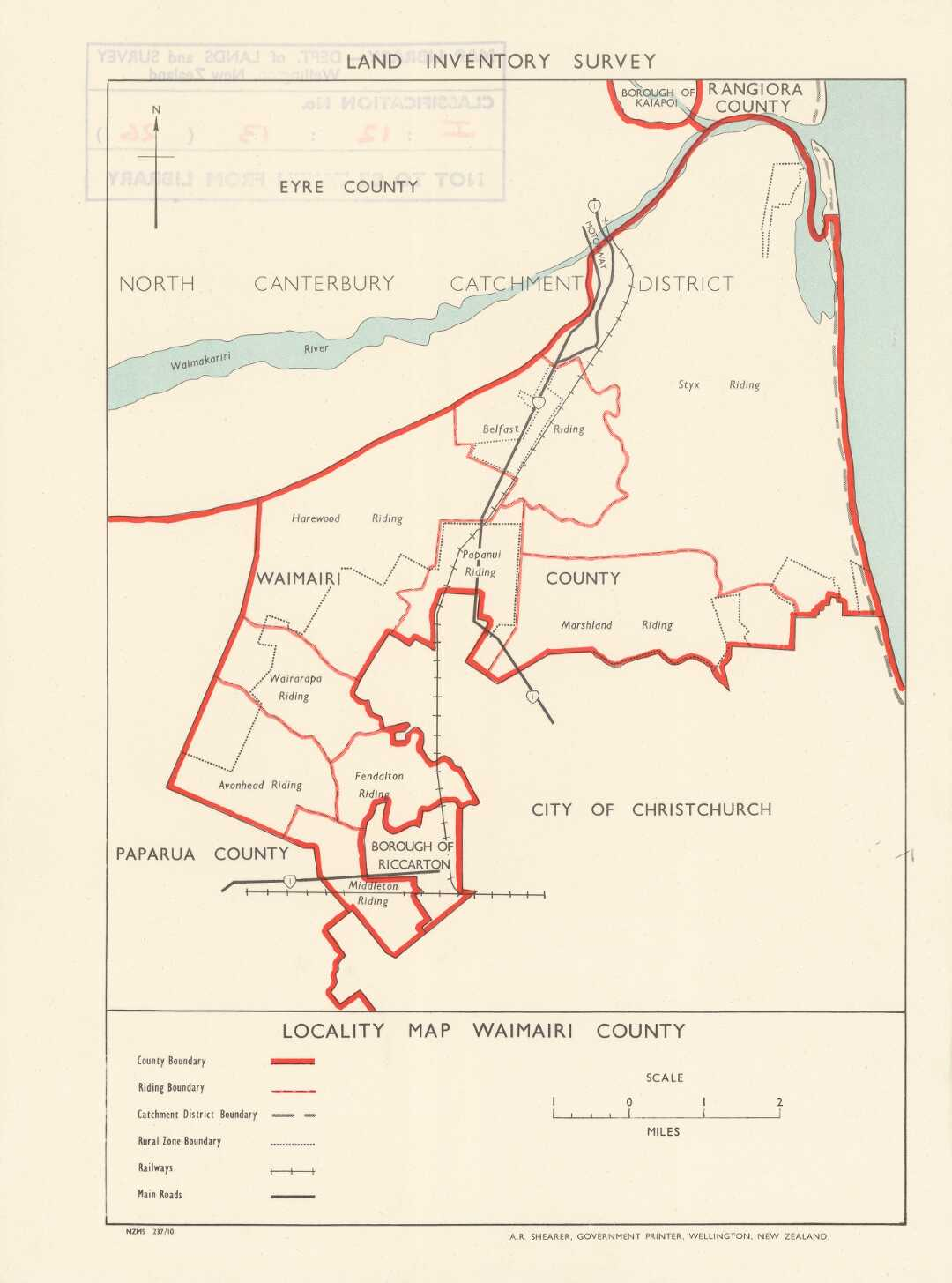
- Waimairi County ridings in 1970
- Capital: Papanui
- History
  - Established: 1909
  - Disestablished: 1982
- Today part of: Christchurch City Council

Waimairi was one of the counties of New Zealand in the South Island.

In October 1909 the Waimairi County Council was formed from part of Selwyn County and had its first meeting in the Christchurch Drainage Board's office on 17 May 1910. There was a councillor from each of Avon, Belfast, Fendalton, Harewood, Marshland, Middleton, Papanui, Riccarton and Styx ridings. In 1910, the Avon Road Board and the Riccarton Road Board became part of the newly formed Council. Hagley and Wairarapa ridings were created in 1911. Riccarton Borough Council was created from part of Waimairi in 1913.

In June 1913 the County decided to build a Town Hall. The brick County Offices were opened on 7 August 1914 and sold in 1963 as part of the site of Northlands Shopping Centre.

In 1914 North Richmond and, in 1923, Papanui, left Waimairi to join Christchurch City. Waimairi took over from Upper Riccarton Domain Board in 1955 and from Marshland Domain Board in 1972. The County became a District in 1982.

On 1 November 1989 Christchurch City, Heathcote County, Riccarton Borough, Waimairi District and Paparua County, all merged to form Christchurch City, taking on the duties and powers of Christchurch Drainage Board, Christchurch Transport Board, Christchurch Town Hall Board of Management, Riccarton Bush Trust, Fendalton Domain Board and Waimairi Electric Power Board, as part of the 1989 local government reforms.

== See also ==
- List of former territorial authorities in New Zealand § Counties
