= Southland County =

Former county in New Zealand

Coordinates: 46.1°S 168.6°E

Southland County was one of the counties of New Zealand in the South Island. Created in 1876, it was in the eastern part of Southland Region. The surrounding counties were Wallace County, Lake County, Vincent County, Tuapeka County and Clutha County. Within the county, but not part of it, was the City of Invercargill, where the county headquarters were located, and the boroughs of Bluff, Winton, Gore and Mataura, as well as the town district of Wyndham; Lumsden, on the boundary with Wallace County, had its own boundary. The county was abolished in 1989, with most of it being merged into Southland District, the exceptions were the Gore and Mataura areas taken into Gore District, and Bluff became part of Invercargill, which had its boundaries expanded considerably; many places near Invercargill, formerly in the county, became part of the city.

== See also ==
- List of former territorial authorities in New Zealand
- Southland (disambiguation)
