= Geraldine County =

Former county of New Zealand

Coordinates: 44°05′36″S 171°14′41″E

- County of New Zealand
- 1876–1989
- Capital: Geraldine
- History
  - Established: 1876
  - Disestablished: 1989
- Today part of: Timaru District

Geraldine County was one of the original counties of New Zealand in the South Island, set up when Provincial governments were abolished.

When South Canterbury was divided into four districts in 1861, Provincial Council debated the name Orari but decided on Geraldine. In February 1864 Geraldine district elected its first Road Board.

Under the Counties Act 1876 South Canterbury was divided into Geraldine and Waimate counties. At the elections in 1876 Temuka Riding had 2 seats and the other ridings were Mount Peel, Raukapuka, Levels and Mount Cook.

In 1872 Temuka became a Road Board, then on 18 March 1883 a "lively" public meeting decided Temuka should be a borough, but this did not happen until 17 August 1899. Temuka town district was gazetted on 8 May 1884, with its suburbs of Wallingford and Arowhenua from 22 July 1886. The first meeting of Temuka Town Board was on 4 June 1884,

Mount Cook and Levels continued as road boards, Mount Peel Road Board was established in 1870, Raukapuka (from 1873 renamed Geraldine) Road Board in 1871, South Orari River Board in 1872, Upper Orari River Board in 1903, and the Rangitata Island River Board in 1911. They were absorbed into the county in 1920. On 1 October 1883 Mount Cook Road District became Mackenzie County. The Levels became a county in 1894. Timaru became a borough in 1865, but it was 13 July 1868 when it was gazetted. Waimate followed in 1879, Temuka in 1899 and Geraldine in 1905.

In 1901 the county had a population of 5,991 and an area of 945.8 square miles (2,450 km^{2}).

The county was bounded on the north by the Rangitata River to its source in the mountains, on the south by the Ōpihi to its source at Burkes Pass, on the east by the sea, and on the west by the hills dividing the Rangitata and Opihi Rivers from the Tekapo.

In 1921 Geraldine became a County River Board, particularly working to harness the Rangitata, Orari and Waihī Rivers.

Geraldine County's first meetings were in Timaru, later moving to Temuka, then back to Timaru and finally to Geraldine. The first meeting was on 4 January 1877, in Timaru Courthouse. It was agreed that the regular meetings be held at the Road Board Office, Temuka. 16 Church Street, Timaru is a listed classical brick building, built for the South Canterbury Times in 1884, but vacated when the paper moved to Sophia Street in 1887. Geraldine County used the offices from at least 1891. On 1 February 1895 Levels County took over the offices in Church Street. After the merger of Geraldine and Levels in 1974 the Church Street property went into private commercial use.

In 1974 Geraldine County amalgamated with Levels County to form Strathallan County and, in the 1989 local government reforms, Strathallan County joined Geraldine Borough, Temuka Borough and Timaru City to form Timaru District.

== See also ==
- List of former territorial authorities in New Zealand § Counties
