= Oroua =

Oroua may refer to:

- Oroua River, a river in the North Island of New Zealand
- Oroua County, a county in the North Island of New Zealand
- Oroua (New Zealand electorate), a parliamentary electorate in New Zealand from 1902 to 1938
