= Marlborough County =

Coordinates: 41.514°S 173.960°E

- County of New Zealand
- 1876–1989
- Capital: Blenheim Borough
- History
  - Established: 1876
  - Disestablished: 1989
- Today part of: Marlborough District

Marlborough County was one of the counties of New Zealand on the South Island.

During the period 1853 to 1859, the area that would become Marlborough County was administered by Nelson Province. After a vote in 1859, the area that would become Marlborough County was administered as part of the new Marlborough Province. With the Abolition of Provinces Act 1876, Marlborough County was created, taking over administration of its area on 1 January 1877. The county council's administrative headquarters was located in Blenheim Borough.

Sometime before 1913, Sounds County, surrounding the Picton Borough administrative area, amalgamated into Marlborough County due to insufficient population to ever form its own county council.

Marlborough County existed until the 1989 local government reforms, when the Marlborough District was formed through the amalgamation of the Marlborough County, Blenheim Borough and Picton Borough administrative areas.
