= Waimate West County =

Former county of New Zealand

Coordinates: 39°33′S 174°07′E

- County of New Zealand
- 1908–1989
- Capital: Manaia
- History
  - Established: 1908
  - Disestablished: 1989
- Today part of: South Taranaki District

Waimate West County was one of the counties of New Zealand on the North Island.

Waimate West County was formed from the western part of Hawera County in 1908 and became part of South Taranaki District in 1989.

== See also ==
- List of former territorial authorities in New Zealand § Counties
