= Eyre County =

Former county of New Zealand

Coordinates: 43°21′53″S 172°34′52″E

- County of New Zealand
- 1883–1989
- Capital: Ohoka
- History
  - Established: 1883
  - Disestablished: 1989
- Today part of: Waimakariri District

Eyre County was one of the counties of New Zealand in the South Island.

Local government in the area began in 1864, when the Provincial Council gave Road Boards responsibility for roads, drainage and development and the power to levy rates. Ashley County extended from the Waimakariri River to the Hurunui River was subdivided into 8 ridings, first elected on 22 December 1876 for Oxford, Cust, Kowai, Mandeville (2), Waipara, Mount Thomas, West Eyreton and Eyreton. The County had few powers and left local administration to the Boards.

The Boards were absorbed into Ashley, Eyre, Kowai, Oxford and Rangiora Counties. Eyre County Council was formed on 23 April 1912 with 4 members elected from Eyreton Riding and 2 from West Eyreton Riding. It took over the 1879 Eyreton Road Board Office, at Ohoka, which now has a Category B Historic Places listing.

On 1 April 1989 Rangiora District, Eyre County (except south of Waimakariri River), Oxford County, Kaiapoi Borough, Hurunui County's Mount Thomas riding west of the Okuku River, Waimakariri-Ashley Water Supply Board, Kaiapoi Municipal Electricity Department and Waimakariri Harbour Board merged to form Waimakariri District as part of the 1989 local government reforms.

== See also ==
- List of former territorial authorities in New Zealand § Counties
