= Whangaroa County =

Former county of New Zealand

Coordinates: 35°6′S 173°47′E

- County of New Zealand
- 1876–1989
- Capital: Kaeo
- History
  - Established: 1876
  - Disestablished: 1989
- Today part of: North Island

Whangaroa County was one of the counties of New Zealand on the North Island, established in 1876. In 1989 it became part of the Far North District Council when amalgamated with the Mangonui, Hokianga and Bay of Islands counties, and the Kaitaia and Kaikohe boroughs.

== Geography ==
Whangaroa County centred around the eponymous harbour and extended from Totuna Point to Takou Bay. The county's hinterland comprises hills and valleys and includes the town of Kaeo. Prior to European settlement the area was largely forested. The county was the smallest in both population and size of any Northland county.

== Climate ==
The climate is characterised by mild winters and dry summers.

== Economy ==
The area's economy is primarily made up of beef cattle and sheep. Almost half of the land area is suitable for agricultural purpose with over 95% of suitable land being used for agriculture. Horticulture is rare due to a lack of productive soil. Most mining in the area has been around Matauri Bay but mining was expected to expand in the county.

Many harbourside areas have had substantial amounts of baches built over the late 20th century.

== See also ==
- List of former territorial authorities in New Zealand § Counties
