= Uawa County =

County in New Zealand

- County of New Zealand
- 1918–1964
- Capital: Tolaga Bay
- Area
  - Coordinates: 38°22.3′S 178°17.815′E
- Population
  - 1926: 1,666
  - 1945: 1,503
- History
  - Separation from Cook County: 10 December
  - Amalgamation with Cook County: 1 April 1964
- Today part of: Gisborne Region

Uawa County was one of the counties of New Zealand on the North Island. Today a part of the Gisborne Region, the county was constituted on 10 December 1918. The area had previously been a part of Cook County, and became a part of the county again when the two councils were amalgamated on 1 April 1964.

== History ==
Uawa County (constituted on 10 December 1918) made two attempts to secede from Cook County: in 1885 (with Waimata and Waiapu) and in 1909, when a separate county (Takirau County) was proposed. Although taxpayers had complained about the lack of infrastructure, a proposal to raise NZ£25,000 for roads and bridges was rejected in October 1910 by the slender margin of 3 2/3 votes below the required three-fifths majority. The first council comprised:

- Arakihi Riding: C. E. Smith, J. A. Moore and D. H. Hawkins
- Tauwhareparae: F. Hutchinson and J. McNeil
- Hauiti: E. B. Boland
- Mangatuna: J. S. Paterson

At the first meeting on May 12, 1919, Boland was elected chairman. One of the council's earliest decisions was that the county should secede from Gisborne Harbour District.

A flat-bottomed boat was used to carry passengers across the Uawa River. Cattle from stations on their way to Gisborne were swum over, with residents who owned boats assisting. In 1883, a cable ferry, attached to an overhead cable and operated by a windlass was begun with W. Lockwood Sr. in charge. Between 1885 and 1893, the ferryman was Enoch Kirk, who was credited with ferrying 2,400 sheep in four hours. The ferry could carry a coach and five horses. At first, a whaleboat was used for passengers and light cargo at Tolaga Bay under the direction of Lockwood, J. A. Moore, H. Glover and W. E. Holder. Oil launches were later used.

The first bridge over the Uawa River was built in 1905 at a cost of £6,000. For two years, toll charges were levied (sixpence per person and a shilling for each horse), with W. E. Holder the first custodian. On 12 May 1916, a flood—the first of thirteen in twelve months—caused a portion of the bridge to subside. Two more bridges were destroyed during a flood in January 1917. Another flood on 4 February 1917 (when 19 inches (48 cm) of rain fell in 18 hours) did further damage. So great was the rush of water that a bank over 6 feet (1.8 m) high formed at the mouth of the river. Until a new bridge was built, ferry service resumed. Another bridge was washed away by a flood in February 1938; however, a concrete bridge had just been completed, and it was opened for traffic within 12 hours.

When the county was established, the coastal road between Gisborne and Tolaga Bay and a new bridge over the Pakarae River were under construction. In 1922, taxpayers approved a £104,000 bond for road and bridge construction (including the metalling of the Uawa portion of the Gisborne-Tolaga Bay highway and improvements to the section linking Uawa and Waiapu). A crushing plant was installed at Mangatuna, and a fleet of five trucks acquired. Local officials included:

Chairmen

- E. B. Boland (1919–30)
- J. McNeil (1930–43)
- H. R. Irving (1943–unknown)

Engineers

- J. P. Guthrie (1919–30)
- G. W. King (1930–38)
- C. Percy (1939–unknown)

County clerks

- F. T. Robinson (1919–24)
- H. L. Tempest (1924–47)
- A. B. Smith (1947–48)
- R. Tregurtha (1948–unknown)

== Early settlers ==
Andrew Reeves (born at Moffatt, Dumfriesshire in 1832) reached Wellington in 1857, bought a horse and rode to the Hawke's Bay region. There, he was a manager for Purvis Russell and in 1863 bought a property near Wairoa. Reeves and his wife went to Tolaga Bay in December 1865, and were the first Europeans to settle there permanently. For many years, Reeves leased a total of 6,000 acres (9.4 sq mi). He had trouble obtaining title to Wharekaka, but his rights were upheld in court. Reeves was long the only Justice of the Peace at Tolaga Bay, and held a seat on the Cook County council for several terms. He died on 5 November 1903.

For her service in the early days treating the sick, Margaret (Granny) Lockwood of Tolaga Bay was long remembered by many east-coast families. She attended cases from Pakarae to Waipiro Bay, and her skills as a midwife were renowned. A daughter of Robert Espie and Ani Umutopua, Lockwood was born at Mawhai in 1839. Her first husband was Abraham Moore of Auckland. After his death she married his partner, William Lockwood (born in Rhode Island), and in 1875 they moved to Tolaga Bay. Granny Lockwood died on 15 December 1932, leaving over 100 descendants.

Captain William Henry Glover (called "Karawa" by the Māori) was born in Newcastle upon Tyne. Before settling at Tolaga Bay in 1855, he had a store at Waipare. He was the district's first sheep farmer (1864) and its first publican (1866). His daughter Lucy married Edward Robson, who held a seat on the Cook County council for several years. His son Henry (1857–1942) was a noted boatman. Captain Glover died on 24 November 1881.

Edward Murphy (born 1845 at St. Kilda, Victoria) obtained a lease of Paremata (Tolaga Bay) in 1873 and was appointed a Justice of the Peace at that time. With his family, he returned to Australia in 1882; in 1884, he returned and settled in Panikau (then undeveloped), making his home at Manutuke. In 1891, Murphy became an original lessees of Tauwhareparae. For a number of years, he served on the Cook County Council. Among Murphy's gifts was the Bethany (Edward Murphy Memorial) Hospital at Gisborne, which was opened on 14 December 1920. He died in Auckland on 27 June 1919.

Henry Williams (born in Wales in 1845) migrated with his parents to Australia in 1853. He came to Wellington in 1865, and was apprenticed in the tannery business. In 1875 Williams moved to Poverty Bay, where he was a shopkeeper and butcher. Four years later, he moved to Tolaga Bay, settling about seven miles upriver and opening a general store and butcher shop with a partner (J. Morris). In the early 1880s, he acquired Taumatarata, which was then undeveloped. He added Waiomoko to this holding, and named his entire property Waiomoko. Williams moved to Gisborne in 1912, and died on 26 October 1934.

Edward Brabazon Boland began his public service in 1907, when he was elected to represent the Tolaga Bay riding on the Cook County council. He was the first chairman of the Uawa County Council and the Tolaga Bay Harbour Board.

Michael (Micky) Mullooly lived in Tolaga Bay. Born in Ireland in 1836, he tried his luck in the Ballarat gold fields and at Gabriel's Gully. Mullooly served in the East Cape War, and was a guard on the Chatham Islands when Te Kooti and his group escaped. In 1873, he opened the Sea View Hotel at Tolaga Bay, providing his guests with simple, adequate accommodation. One morning, a guest complained that his boots were not cleaned, although he left them outside his bedroom door. Mullooly could hardly believe that anyone would have taken the risk of losing his footgear. “You are very lucky,” he told him, “that you found them there in the morning!” What he had in mind was that some of his patrons were noted for their light-fingered habits. Mullooly was described as “a little man who revelled in litigation, but was apt to grasp at the shadow and lose the substance.” His guests could depend on being regaled with his version of his latest battle in the courts. Mullooly died on 13 June 1912.

== 1875 to 1945 ==
The 252-acre (102 ha) site of Tolaga Bay township was bought by the Crown on 10 March 1875 for £505. At the time, it was covered with gorse. In 1904, the name "Buckley" (after Sir Patrick Buckley, colonial secretary in the Seddon cabinet) was given to the township; however, residents continued to use the name "Tolaga Bay" (which Captain James Cook gave to the adjacent inlet). Major roads bear names commemorating the navigator's visit.

With 52 European residents (and the same number in the surrounding area), Tolaga Bay was the largest European settlement on the east coast in 1875. The 1926 population of Uawa County in 1926 was Europeans, 1,074 and Maoris, 592. In 1945, there were 749 Europeans and 754 Maoris, with an additional 3 percent absent due to the war. The gross capital value of the county in 1945 was £1,257,536.

A tragedy occurred on 11 June 1887, when Mrs. Enoch Kirk and three of her children were being brought ashore from the SS Australia. Harry Glover was responsible for the surfboat, with Rawiri and Ropihana Tautau and Harry Hiutau in the crew. Inside the shoal, the boat was capsized by a wave. Glover got Mrs. Kirk ashore, but she died; Rawiri Tautau survived. A boat, manned by Constable M. G. Stagpoole, Joe James and Sam Gilman, attempted to rescue the others but also capsized; Gilman swam ashore. The constable lashed Hiutau to his upturned boat, and they were picked up by a boat sent from the Australia. In addition to Mrs. Kirk and her children—Nellie (age nine), Ralph (age two) and Maud (age one)—Joe James and Ropihana Tautau also died. Stagpoole was awarded a silver medal by the Royal Humane Society of Australasia.

On 25 January 1923, taxpayers in the Tolaga Bay harbour district, by a vote of 115–22, authorised a bond not exceeding £100,000 for a reinforced concrete wharf area for coastal vessels. The wharf and jetty are 2,150 feet (660 m) long, and their depth at low tide is 17 feet (5.2 m). The first harbourmaster was J. M. Fraser.
