= Clifton County =

Former county of New Zealand

Coordinates: 38°59′45″S 174°13′59″E

- County of New Zealand
- 1885–1989
- Capital: Waitara
- Area
- 1,175 km^{2} (454 sq mi)
- History
  - Established: 1885
  - Disestablished: 1989
- Today part of: Taranaki Region

Clifton County was one of the counties of New Zealand in the North Island. It became part of New Plymouth District in 1989.

== See also ==
- List of former territorial authorities in New Zealand § Counties
