= Clutha County =

Former county in New Zealand

Coordinates: 46°14′S 169°45′E

- County of New Zealand
- 1876–1989
- Capital: Balclutha
- History
  - Established: 1876
  - Disestablished: 1989
- Today part of: Clutha District

Clutha County was one of the counties of New Zealand in the South Island. Its first meeting was on 4 January 1877 at the Balclutha courthouse. The offices on the corner of Clyde and Elizabeth Streets in Balclutha were rebuilt in 1934 and demolished in 2009. Clutha District Council began in November 1989 with amalgamation of Balclutha Borough, Clutha County, Lawrence Borough, Tapanui Borough, part of Tuapeka County and Bruce District Council. Bruce District Council had been formed in 1986 from Bruce County, Milton Borough and Kaitangata Borough.

== See also ==
- List of former territorial authorities in New Zealand § Counties
