= Oroua County =

County in New Zealand

Coordinates: 40.166667°S 175.583333°E

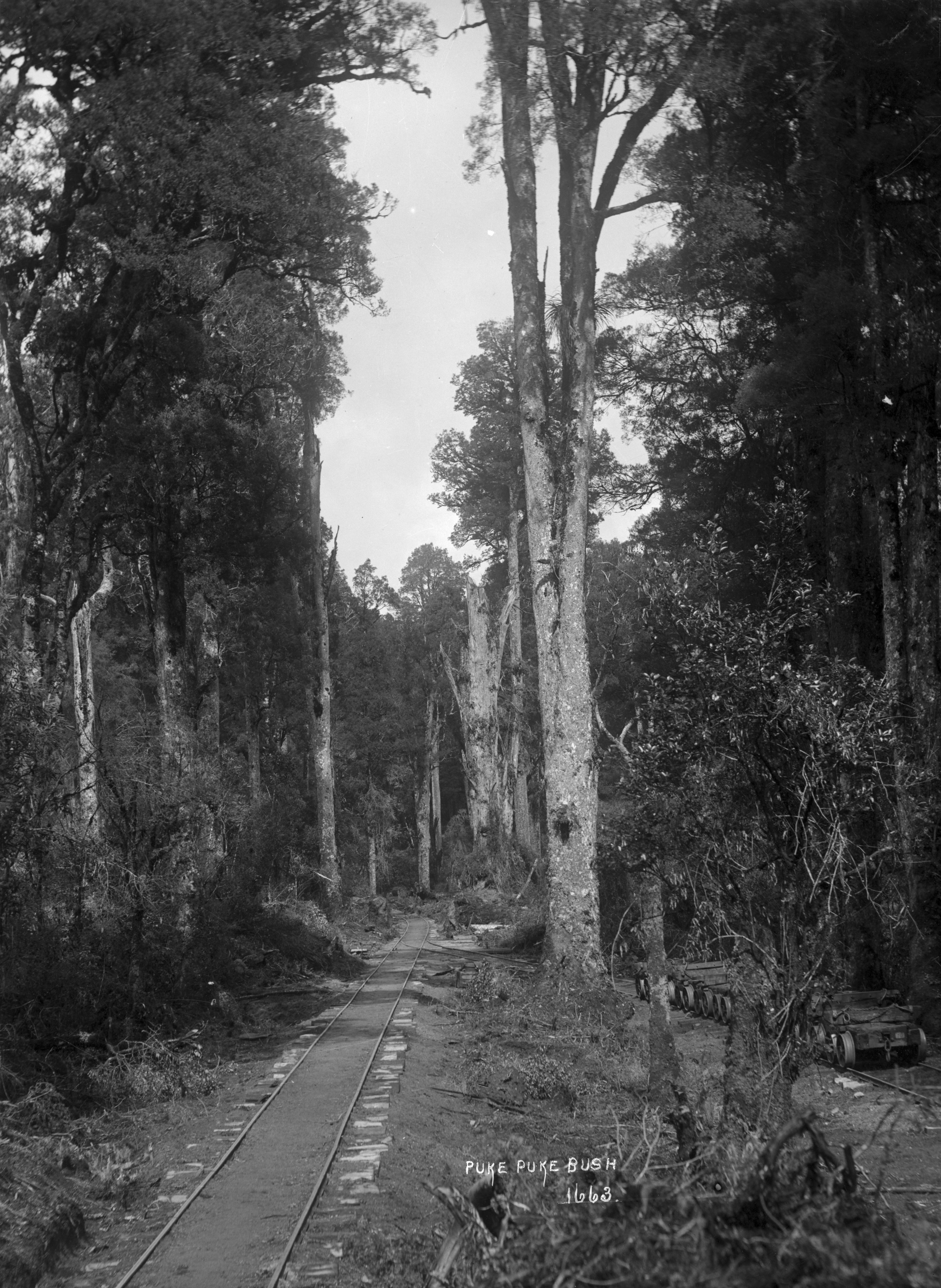
Logging railway track through bush at Pukepuke in Oroua County

Oroua County was one of the counties of New Zealand in the North Island. Centred on the town of Feilding, it had an extent of just under 500 square kilometres.

The county was first established in 1883, unilaterally declared as a protest against the local Manawatu County Council. It covered much of what is now Manawatū District as well as part of Palmerston North city, and the initially elected councillors stood on the platform of abolishing county administrative activities within the area. Activities were devolved to local town and road boards, and the county as an administrative entity became essentially non-existent. Over the following twenty years, several parts of Oroua had been reorganised into new counties (Kiwitea, Kairanga, and Pohangina). The rump of Oroua County (except for Ashhurst, which was transferred to Palmerston North City Council) was reestablished officially in 1903.

The county was disestablished and merged into Manawatū District as part of New Zealand's 1989 local government reforms of administrative regions.

== See also ==
- List of counties of New Zealand
