= Waimate County =

Former county of New Zealand

Coordinates: 44°44′02″S 171°02′47″E

- County of New Zealand
- 1876–1989
- Capital: Waimate
- History
  - Established: 1876
  - Disestablished: 1989
- Today part of: South Island

Waimate County was one of the counties of New Zealand on the South Island.

Waimate County Council was replaced by Waimate District Council in 1989.

== See also ==
- List of former territorial authorities in New Zealand § Counties
