= Waikato County =

County in New Zealand

Coordinates: 37.791167°S 175.292454°E

- County of New Zealand
- 1876–1989
- Capital: Hamilton
- History
  - Established: 1876
  - Disestablished: 1989
- Today part of: Waikato region

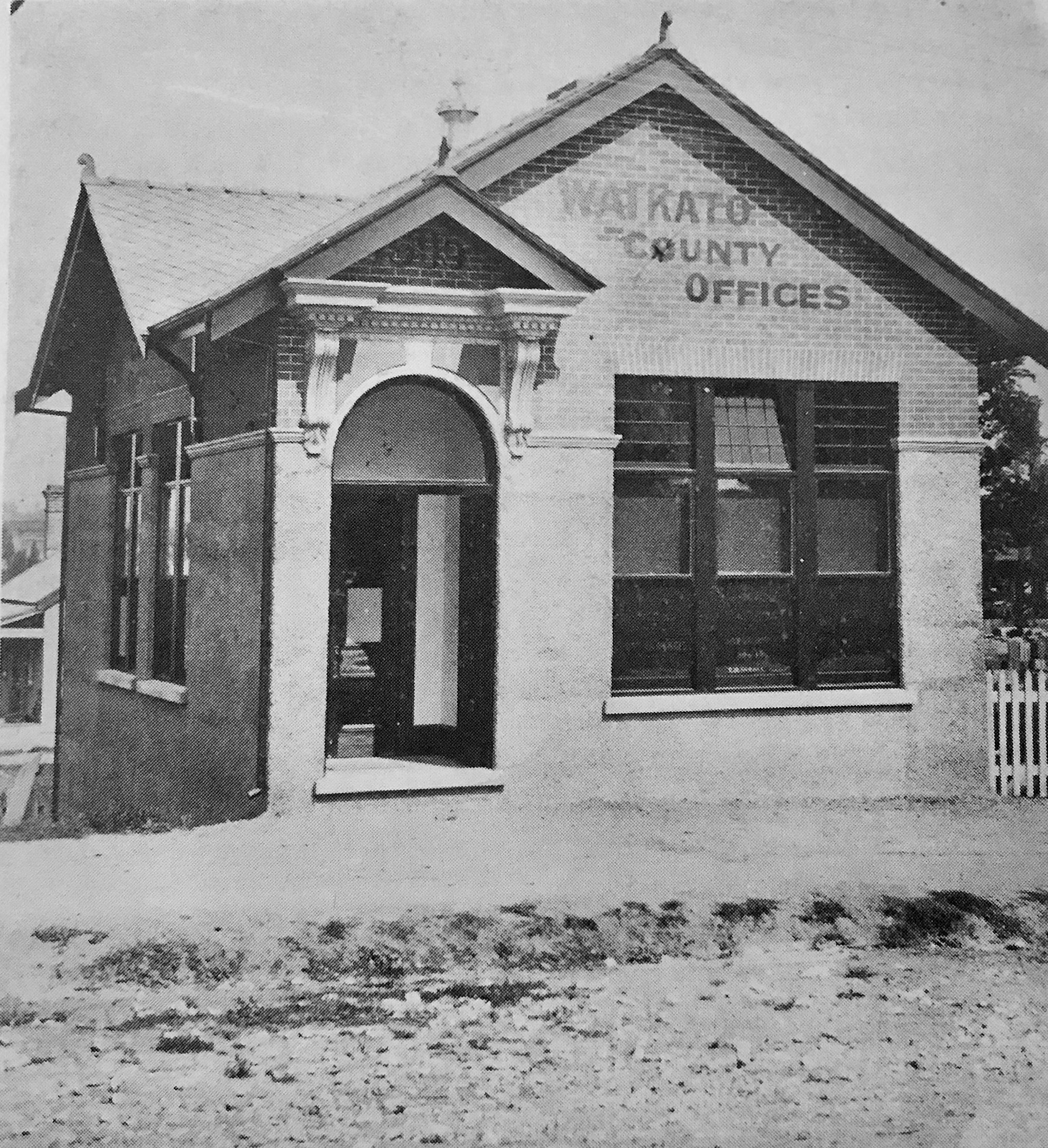
Waikato County Offices about 1910

Waikato County was one of the counties of New Zealand on the North Island. Under the Local Government (Waikato Region) Reorganisation Order of 1989, nearly all of the county was merged with the boroughs of Huntly, Ngāruawāhia, most of Raglan County Council, and a small part of Waipa County Council, to form Waikato District Council.

The council first met on 9 January 1877 at the Court House in Cambridge.

In 1923, Waikato County covered 640 sq mi (1,700 km^{2}) and had a population of 8,350, with 128 mi (206 km) of gravel roads, 356 mi (573 km) of mud roads and 12 mi (19 km) of tracks.

The former County Council office at 455 Grey Street in Hamilton East opened in 1910. It is protected by a Category B listing in Hamilton City's District Plan. It was replaced by new offices to the rear of it, which had a foundation stone dated 4 February 1971 and were first used for a meeting on 21 March 1972. The old building was leased to the Ministry of Agriculture. After 1989, the new building was used by Waikato District Council and then by Hill Laboratories until 2017. Since 2020 it has been renovated as Hills Village apartments.

== See also ==
- List of former territorial authorities in New Zealand § Counties
