= Waipa County =

Former county of New Zealand

Coordinates: 38°00′38″S 175°19′24″E

- County of New Zealand
- 1877–1989
- 1935 map
- Capital: Te Awamutu
- History
  - Established: 1877
  - Disestablished: 1989
- Today part of: Waipā District Council

Waipa County was one of the counties of New Zealand on the North Island. Its boundaries were the Waikato, Waipā and Puniu Rivers and the Aukati Line.

Waipa County was formed on 9 January 1877, initially with 5 ridings; Newcastle riding elected 1 councillor, Hamilton 2, Mangapiko 2, Rangiaohia 1 and Pukekura 1. By 1944 there was 1 Councillor for each of Hamilton, Tuhikaramea, Pukekura, Orakau, Kakepuku Rukuhia, Kaipaki and Rangiaohia ridings and 2 for each of Newcastle and Mangapiko.

In the 1989 reorganisation, most of Waipa County, Te Awamutu Borough Council and Cambridge Borough Council were amalgamated into Waipā District.

== See also ==
- List of former territorial authorities in New Zealand § Counties
