= Oxford County, New Zealand =

Former county in New Zealand

Coordinates: 43.3127°S 172.1905°E

Oxford County was one of the counties of New Zealand in the South Island.

Oxford County Council was first elected on 20 April 1912, with four members from the North Riding and three from the South Riding.

On 1 April 1989 Rangiora District, Eyre County (except south of Waimakariri River), Oxford County, Kaiapoi Borough, Hurunui County's Mount Thomas riding west of the Okuku River, Waimakariri- Ashley Water Supply Board, Kaiapoi Municipal Electricity Department and Waimakariri Harbour Board merged to form Waimakariri District as part of the 1989 local government reforms.

The County used the Waimakariri-Ashley Water Supply Board office in the Main Street at Oxford.

== See also ==
- List of former territorial authorities in New Zealand § Counties
