= Heathcote County =

Former county of New Zealand

Coordinates: 43°34′0″S 172°42′0″E

- County of New Zealand
- 1911–1989
- History
  - Established: 1911
  - Disestablished: 1989
- Today part of: Christchurch City Council

Heathcote County was one of the former counties of New Zealand. It covered the southern parts of Christchurch.

== History ==
Heathcote County was preceded by the Heathcote Road Board, which had its first meeting on 27 January 1864. An 1863 ordinance from the Canterbury Provincial Council established three road boards along the Ōpāwaho / Heathcote River: East, Central, and South Heathcote. The Roads Ordinance was amended in 1864, and East Heathcote became the Heathcote Road Board, Central Heathcote became the Spreydon Road Board, and South Heathcote became the Halswell Road Board.

Heathcote became a county in 1911. In 1953 part of the county was incorporated into Christchurch City. The county was abolished through the 1989 local government reforms, when the rest became part of Christchurch City.

== Chairmen ==
=== Road Board ===
The Road Board had 19 chairmen between 1864 and 1911.

	Name	Term
1	William Montgomery	1864–1865
2	James Temple Fisher	1865–1869
3	Walter Kennaway	1869–1870
	James Temple Fisher (2nd period)	1870–1876
4	R. Clephane	1876–1877
5	Samuel Manning	1877
6	W. Attwood	1878
	R. Clephane (2nd period)	1879–1880
7	William Hawker	1880–1881
8	Frederic Jones	1881–1882
9	E. J. T. Ford	1882–1883
10	George Dryden	1883–1885
11	H. B. Kirk	1885–1886
	George Dryden (2nd period)	1886–1887
12	Arthur Ollivier	1887–1891
13	E. Curry	1891–1892
	H. B. Kirk (2nd period)	1892–1893
14	A. Wiffen	1893–1894
	E. Curry (2nd period)	1894
15	Gilbert McHaffie	1894–1896
16	Robert Malcolm	1896–1897
	Gilbert McHaffie (2nd period)	1897–1899
17	John Martin	1899–1901
	Gilbert McHaffie (3rd period)	1901–1902
	Robert Malcolm (2nd period)	1903–1905
18	George Scott	1905–1906
19	Frederic Corson	1906–1907
	George Scott (2nd period)	1905–1906

=== County Council ===
The County Council had 16 chairmen between 1911 and 1989. The last chairman of the Road Board became the first chairman of the County Council.

	Name	Term
1	George Scott	1911–1916
2	Charles Flavell	1916–1919
3	George K. Burton	1919–1921
4	Walter Scarff	1921–1923
	Charles Flavell (2nd period)	1923–1929
5	G. L. Danks	1929–1932
	Charles Flavell (3rd period)	1932–1935 (Note: The source has a gap for 1932–1935, but the reference shows that Flavell was chairman in September 1934. It is assumed that Flavell's third period covers the missing years.)
	Walter Scarff (2nd period)	1935–1936
6	A. G. Williams	1936–1939
	Charles Flavell (4th period)	1939–1941 (Note: The source has a gap for 1939–1941, but the reference shows that Flavell was chairman in August 1939. It is assumed that Flavell's fourth period covers the missing years.)
	A. G. Williams (2nd period)	1941–1943
7	Frederick William Freeman	1944–1959
8	R. A. Young	1959–1962
9	J. C. Holliss	1962–1964
10	Doug Le Comte	1964–1968
11	J. S. Scott	1968–1971
12	Ted Tyndall	1971–1974
13	Jim Somers	1974–1976
	Ted Tyndall (2nd period)	1976–1977
14	J. M. McKenzie	1977–1980
15	W. M. Hindmarsh	1980–1983
16	Oscar Alpers	1983–1989

Table footnotes:

== See also ==
- List of former territorial authorities in New Zealand § Counties
- List of counties of New Zealand
