= Weber County, New Zealand =

Coordinates: 40.43995°S 176.39469°E

Weber County
- County of New Zealand
- 1902–1956
- History
  - Established: 1902
  - Disestablished: 1956
- Today part of: Tararua District

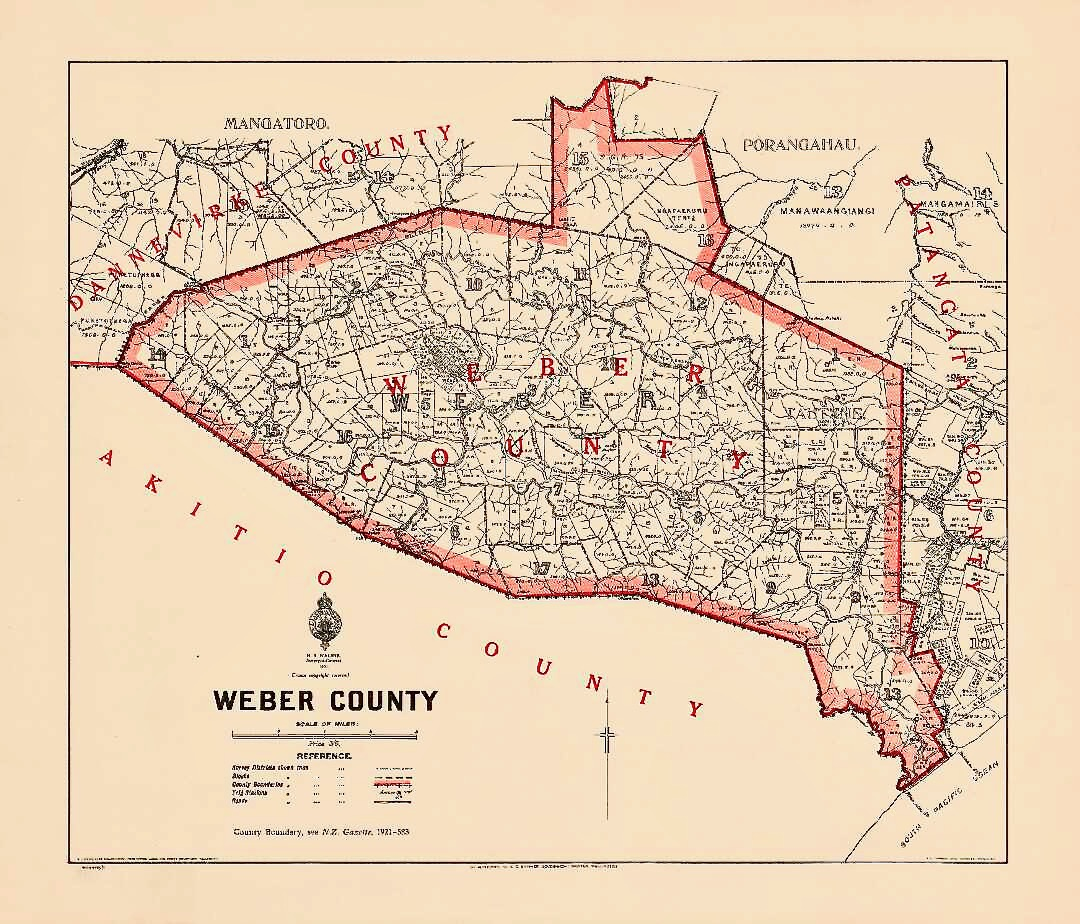
Weber County 1931 map. Weber was towards the west side of the county

Weber County was one of the counties of New Zealand in the North Island in the former Seventy Mile Bush.

It included the hamlet of Weber. Sheep grazing dominated the area.

Weber County Council was a small county of 95 mi^{2} (250 km^{2}), formed in 1902 from Weber Road Board and a part of Patangata County Council. It was bounded to the south by Akitio County, to the north-east by the rest of Patangata County and to the north-west by Dannevirke County (or until 1907 by Waipawa County), with which it merged in 1956, as did Akitio (formed 1898) in 1976.

The council was set up by The Weber County Act, 1902. The Council's first meeting was on 20 February 1903. The county office was at Ti-tree Point, on Route 52, about 10 km (6.2 mi) east of Weber.

Weber's population slowly declined. It was 593 in 1906, 525 in 1911 and 340 in 1951. In 1927, there were only 78 ratepayers. The main business of the county remained roading, but, with its small population, it struggled to find money. For example, in 1922 it owned a steam roller, but not a grader. Electricity came to part of the county about 1939.

== See also ==
- List of former territorial authorities in New Zealand § Counties
