= Wallace County, New Zealand =

Coordinates: 45.85°S 167.78°E

Wallace County was one of the counties of New Zealand in the South Island. For a time, James Mackintosh was chairman of the Wallace County. Wallace County was abolished in 1989 and amalgamated into Southland District. The towns of Riverton, Otautau, Ohai, Nightcaps, Tuatapere, Mossburn, Manapouri and Te Anau were in Wallace County.

== See also ==
- List of former territorial authorities in New Zealand § Counties
