= Southland =

Southland may refer to:

== Places ==
=== Canada ===
- Dunbar–Southlands, Vancouver, British Columbia

=== New Zealand ===
- Southland Region, one of New Zealand's sixteen regions, the primary tier of local government
- Southland District, part of the wider Southland Region, the secondary tier of local government
- Southland Plains, an area of low lying geography within the Southland Region
- Southland County, a former New Zealand county, existing between 1876 and 1989
- Southland Province, a former New Zealand county, existing between 1876 and 1870

=== United States ===
- Chicago Southland
- Greater Los Angeles area
- Southern United States
- Southland, Michigan
- Southland, Texas

=== Fictional places ===
- Southland (Shannara), a region in the fictional world of Terry Brooks' Shannara series
- The Southlands (Warhammer), a mythical location in the Warhammer universe
- The Southlands (Lord of the Rings), a location in Middle-earth in J. R. R. Tolkien's fantasy book series
- Southern California in the alternate universe of Southland Tales

== Buildings ==
- Southland Astronomical Society Observatory, in Invercargill, New Zealand
- Southland Center, a former office building, now Sheraton Dallas Hotel in Dallas, Texas
- Southland Leisure Centre, in Calgary, Alberta
- Stadium Southland, Invercargill, New Zealand

=== Shopping centers ===
- Southland Center (Michigan), in Taylor, Michigan, a suburb of Detroit
- Southland Mall (Hayward, California)
- Southland Mall (Houma, Louisiana)
- Southland Mall (Memphis, Tennessee)
- Southland Mall (Miami), Florida
- Southlands (Aurora, Colorado)
- Southlands Centre, Mawson, Australian Capital Territory
- Westfield Southland, formerly Southland Centre in Cheltenham, Victoria, Australia
- Marion Centre, formerly Southland Mall, in Marion, Ohio

== In business and industry ==
- Southland Entertainment Group, an Alabama theme park company
- Southland Corporation, headquarters of 7-Eleven convenience stores
- Southland Casino Racing, casino and greyhound racetrack in Arkansas

=== Movies ===
- Southland Tales, a 2006 science fiction film
- Southlander, an American independent film

=== Music ===
- The Southland (band), from Los Angeles, California
- Southland Records, a United States record label
- The Southlanders, a British vocal group
- Southland (jazz venue), a ballroom in Boston

=== Publications ===
- Southland (novel), by Nina Revoyr
- The Southland Times, a newspaper in New Zealand

=== Television ===
- Southland TV, former name of Cue TV, a television station in New Zealand
- Southland (TV series), a drama set in Los Angeles, California

== Educational institutes ==
=== United States ===
- Southland Academy, Americus, Georgia
- Southland Independent School District, Southland, Texas
- Southland School District, Mower county, Minnesota
- Southland College Preparatory Charter High School, Richton Park, Illinois

=== New Zealand ===
- Northern Southland College, Lumsden, Southland Region
- Southland Polytechnic (Southern Institute of Technology), Invercargill, Southland

=== Other countries ===
- Southlands Elementary School, Vancouver, British Columbia, Canada
- Southland College, in Kabankalan City, Negros Occidental, Philippines
- Southlands College, Galle, Sri Lanka
- Southlands College, Roehampton, a Methodist college in England, UK

== Sports ==
- Southern Steel (netball), a netball team in New Zealand
- Southland Conference, an NCAA Division 1 sports conference
- Southland Sharks, a basketball team in New Zealand
- Southland Rugby Football Union, a rugby union team in New Zealand

== Transportation ==
- HMT Southland (1900), a Belgium tramp steamer
- Southland station (Calgary), a stop on the South Line of the C-Train light rail system in Calgary, Alberta
- Southland railway station, a train station in Cheltenham, Victoria, Australia
- Southland (train), a former passenger train in the United States
- Southland Transportation, a brand of Pacific Western Transportation
