= Bay of Islands County =

Former county in New Zealand

Coordinates: 35°22′48″S 174°4′8″E

- County of New Zealand
- 1876–1989
- Capital: Kawakawa
- Area
- 2,132 km^{2} (823 sq mi)
- History
  - Established: 1876
  - Disestablished: 1989
- Today part of: Far North District

The Bay of Islands County was one of the counties of New Zealand in the North Island.

== Geography ==
The Bay of Islands County encompassed the Bay of Islands, extended to the Hokianga Harbour in the west and bordered Whangarei County to the south.

Most of the soil is of poor fertility but volcanic soil around Kerikeri and Ohaeawai supports a strong horticultural industry. The area was originally forested but this was cleared by Maori prior to European settlement.

== Economy ==
Agriculture has historically been the main economic industry in the area but since the 1980s horticulture, forestry, and tourism have become relevant to the economy. In 1983 around two thirds of the land was occupied by agriculture. Since the 1980s the area has had large subdivisions occurring in coastal areas to support both residential growth and tourism.

== See also ==
- List of former territorial authorities in New Zealand § Counties
