= Ohinemuri County =

Former county of New Zealand

Coordinates: 37.379447970552356°S 175.66942414318163°E

County
- County of New Zealand
- 1885–1989
- History
  - Established: 1885
  - Disestablished: 1989

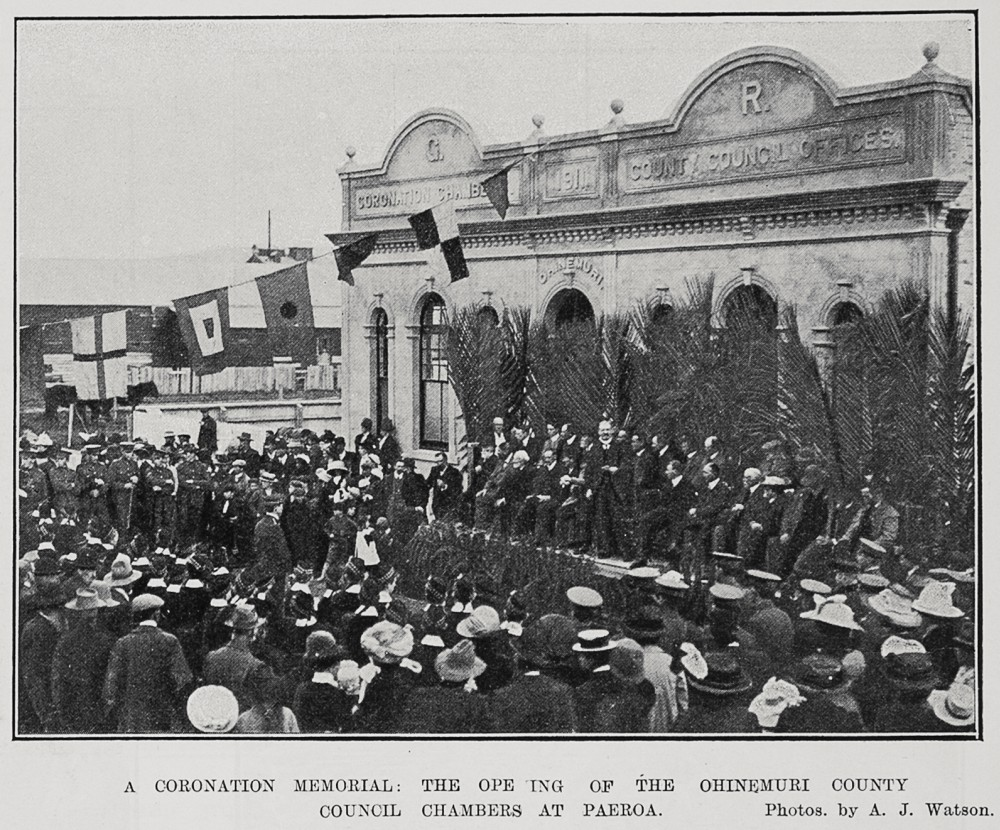
Ohinemuri CC Paeroa council chamber 1912

Ohinemuri County was one of the counties of New Zealand of the North Island.

The Ohinemuri County Council first met on 17 November 1885. It was formed from a portion of Thames County. A 1919 petition resulted in loss of the western part of the area to a new Hauraki Plains County in 1920.

The county was abolished through the 1989 local government reforms.

The population was 1,516 in 1891, 3,056 in 1945 and 5,579 in 1986.

In 1923 Ohinemuri County covered 253 sq mi (660 km^{2}) and had a population of 2,678, with 66 mi (106 km) of gravel roads, 55 mi (89 km) of mud roads and 50 mi (80 km) of tracks.

The 1911 Italianate county offices at 41 Belmont Road, Paeroa, were used by the county until 1986. They are now used by Hauraki Māori Trust Board and protected by an A Category listing in Hauraki District Plan.

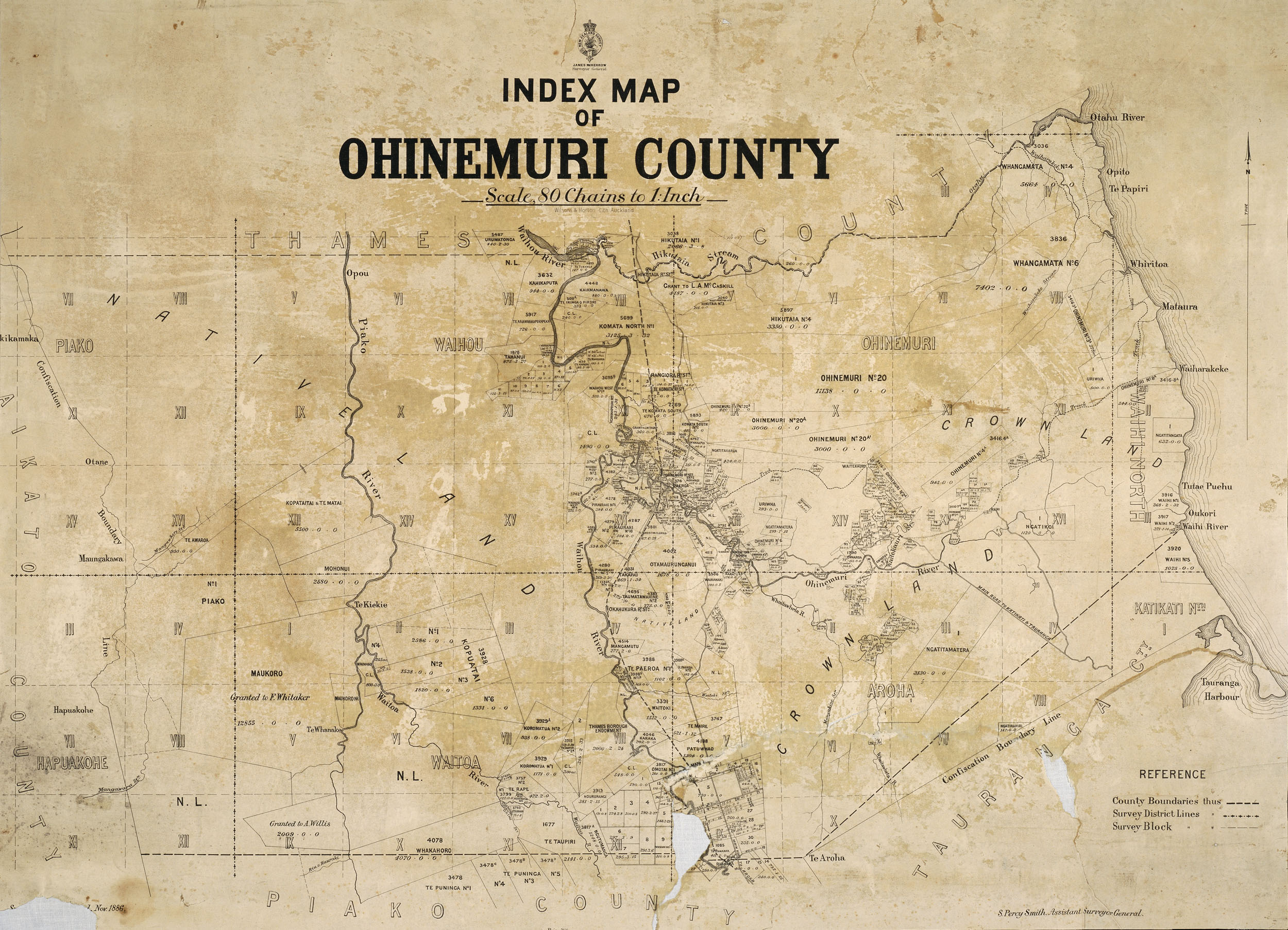
1886 Ohinemuri map

== County leadership ==
	County Chairman	Term	Affiliation
1	Mr. F. Cock	1885–1887	Independent
2	Mr. W. Nicholls	1887–1889	Independent
3	Mr J. Moore	1889–1890	Independent
4	Mr. J. Phillips	1890–1891	Independent
5	Mr. E. Edwards (Snr)	1891–1893	Independent
6	Mr. H. Barrry	1893–1901	Independent
7	Mr. H. Poland	1901–1905	Liberal
8	Mr. W. Nicholls	1905–1908	Independent
9	Mr. P. Grace	1908–1911	Independent
10	Mr. H. Corbett	1911–1916	Independent
11	Mr. C. Lloyd	1916-1916	Independent
12	Mr. P. Grace	1916–1920	Independent
13	Mr. A. Robinson	1920–1925	Independent
14	Mr. W. Johnstone	1925–1926	Independent
15	Mr. H. Corbett	1926–1929	Independent
16	Mr. C. Mason	1929–1932	Independent
17	Mr. W. Marshall	1932–1944	Independent
13	Mr. T. Barrett	1944–?	Independent

	Mayor of Paeroa	Term	Affiliation
1	Mr. Towers	1915–1919	Independent
2	Mr. P. Brenan	1919–1923	Independent
3	Mr W. Marshall	1923–1941	Independent
4	Mr. E. Edwards	1941–1950	Independent
5	Mr. N. C. Davies	1950–1955	Independent
6	Mr. L. J. Shaw	1955–1959	Independent
7	Mr. E. W. Lee	1959–1965	Independent

	Mayor of Waihi	Term	Affiliation
1	Mr W. Phillips	1902–1904	Independent
2	Mr T. Gilmour	1904–1908	Independent
3	Mr J. Newth	1908–1913	Independent
4	Mr M. Power	1913–1915	Independent
5	Mr D. Donaldson	1915–1923	Independent
6	Mr W. Walnutt	1923–1947	Independent
7	Mr S. Bonnici	1947–1947	Independent
8	Mr H. Pickett	1947–1956	Independent
9	Mr C. Christensen	1956–1965	Independent
10	Mr A. Thomas	1965–1971	Independent
11	Mr A. Dean	1971–1977	Independent
12	Mr O. Morgan	1977–1989	Independent

== See also ==
- List of former territorial authorities in New Zealand § Counties
