= Mangonui County =

County in New Zealand

Coordinates: 35.12°S 173.27°E

- County of New Zealand
- 1876–1989
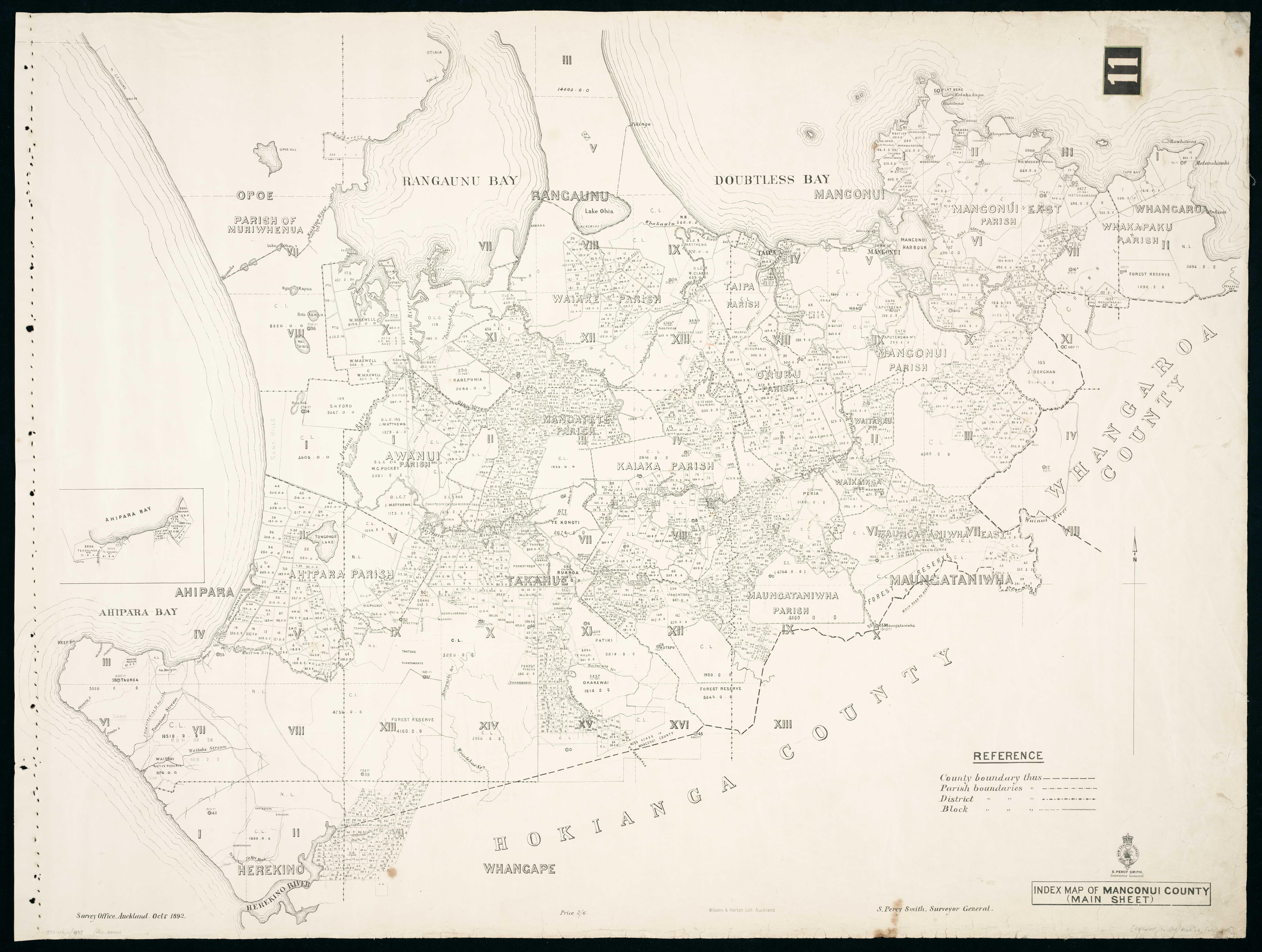
- Area
- History
  - Established: 1876
  - Disestablished: 1989
- Today part of: North Island

Mangonui County, formerly Mongonui County, was one of the counties of New Zealand on the North Island.

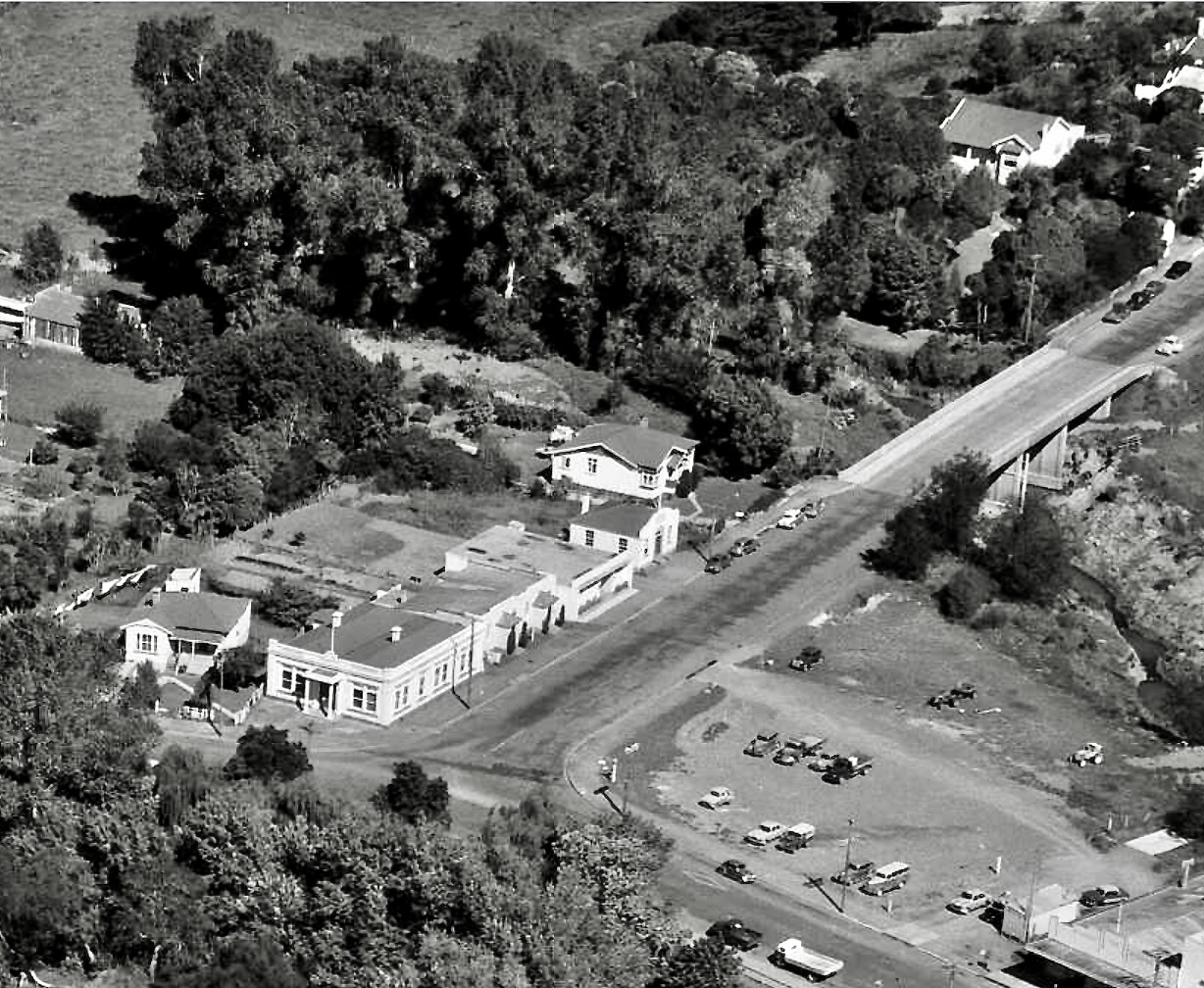
Mangonui County Chambers in 1958

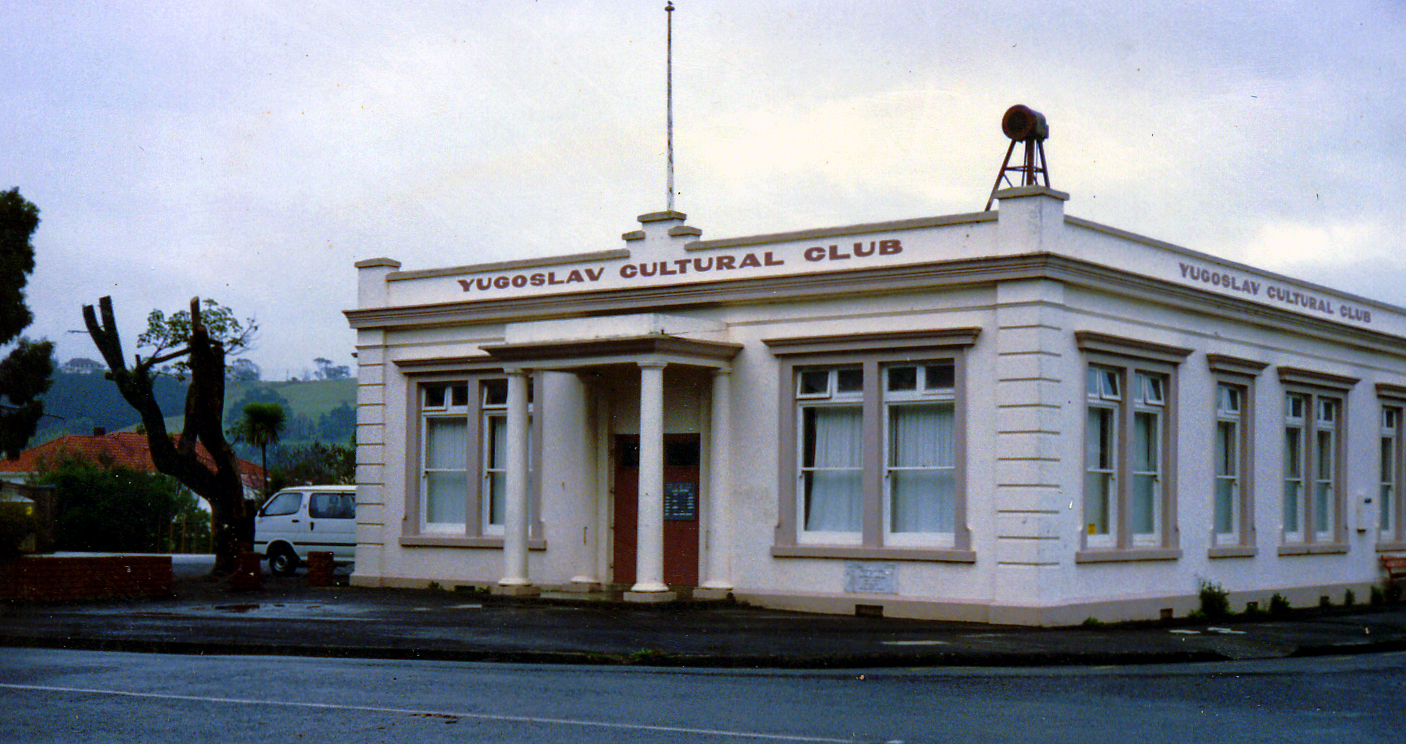
Yugoslav Cultural Club in 1992

== Geography ==
Mangonui County stretched from the Maungataniwha Range to Cape Reinga and covered the most northern part of the North Island. Most of the area was deforested prior to European settlement. The climate of Mangonui is equable with higher averages than the rest of Northland and lower rainfall. These climatic conditions are likely the reason as to why the area has a large amount of archaeological sites relating to Māori agriculture.

== History ==
The County was formed in 1876, when the Auckland Provincial Council was abolished. Most of its work was concerned with roads, but it also built wharves and housing. Whangaroa County was formed in 1886 from the Whangaroa Riding. The County office was then based at Mangōnui, until it moved to Kaitaia in 1918. In 1923 the County accepted a £3,800 tender for new offices. On Monday 17 March 1924 new chambers were opened on the Redan Road/Commerce St corner in Kaitaia. The Kaitaia Town Board became a unit within the county in 1922 and was independent from 1925. However, it (by then Kaitaia Borough Council) and the County shared a town and county clerk from 1977 until abolition in 1989. The old council chambers are registered as a category 2 historic place with Heritage New Zealand.

== Economy ==
The two main industries in the county are agriculture and forestry. Smaller industries include mining and tourism. Forestry began in the 1960s and by 1984 covered 25,800 ha (64,000 acres), the growth largely due to the New Zealand Forest Service.

== See also ==
- List of former territorial authorities in New Zealand § Counties
