= Ashley County, New Zealand =

Coordinates: 43.3034°S 172.5914°E

Ashley County was one of the counties of New Zealand in the South Island. It was formed in 1876. Until 1911, much of the actual power lay with various road boards. Some area was split off in 1911 that became the Kowai County. In 1968, Ashley and Kowai counties amalgamated and carried on under the name Ashley County, with the head office moving from Rangiora to Balcairn at that time. Ashley County amalgamated with Waipara County to form Hurunui County in 1977.

== See also ==
- List of former territorial authorities in New Zealand § Counties
