= Boroughs of New Zealand =

Former unit of municipal government in New Zealand

Borough
- Location: New Zealand
- Created by: Municipal Corporations Act 1867
- Created: 28 May 1868
- Abolished: 1 November 1989
- Number: 179 (ever); 106 (Oct 1989); None (Nov 1989)
- Government: Borough or city council

The boroughs of New Zealand were the administrative divisions representing the country's urban areas, existing from the colonial period until the major local government reforms of 1989 where they were replaced by the modern system of territorial authorities. They were governed by borough and city councils and existed alongside the country's counties, town districts, and other administrative divisions. Boroughs with over 20,000 population could be granted city status.

== History ==
=== Early colonial period ===
When New Zealand became a British colony in 1840, the Colonial Office tasked Governor William Hobson with promoting the establishment of local municipal and district government within the colony through the issuing of proclamations. The Municipal Corporations Ordinance 1842 was the first legislative attempt at this, with the ordinance stating that any district with a minimum of 2,000 residents could become a borough, meaning a council could be elected with powers to set rates for the provision of roads, water infrastructure and jails. Suffrage was open to all adult men not just landowners. Issues arose when the colonial government found that the ordinance limited their ability to build lighthouses; for this and other reasons the ordinance was disallowed in 1843.

=== Provincial period ===
Six provinces were established in New Zealand in 1852. Several provinces passed ordinances establishing their own systems of municipal corporations similar to boroughs, though almost all were established in the prosperous Otago Province. The provinces were abolished in 1876.

=== Municipal Corporations Act 1867 ===
The first colony-wide framework for municipal government was established through the Municipal Corporations Act 1867. Prior to this point, 21 towns and cities had been formed through numerous ordinances at the provincial level. Under the new legislation, each of these places was able to become a municipal corporation upon petition by at least 50 residents, and from that point be constituted a borough governed by a borough council. New boroughs could also be proclaimed in areas outside the existing 21, provided at least 100 residents petitioned the governor.

Christchurch, Lyttelton, and Kaiapoi became the first boroughs created under the Act, being proclaimed as such by the governor on 28 May 1868.

=== Municipal Corporations Act 1876 ===
With provinces abolished in 1876, a new Municipal Corporations Act was passed in the same year. This transferred the boroughs established under the previous 1867 Act, allowing them to exist alongside the new system of counties established in separate legislation. Unlike before, they ceased to exist within the boundaries of a province or county, with boroughs and counties instead both becoming top-level local authorities without overlap.

=== Local Government Act 1974 ===
The Local Government Act 1974 sought to rationalise local government, attempting to tackle the problem whilst dealing with staunchly independent local authorities. The Act abolished the distinction between boroughs and counties, and allowed for the creation of regional units of government. The Act also increased the powers of the Local Government Commission.

=== 1989 reforms ===
In 1989, the Fourth Labour Government enacted major reforms to local government, under the provisions of the Local Government Act 1974. Around 850 local authorities were amalgamated together into 86, with many boroughs amalgamating with their surrounding rural areas to form district councils.

== City status ==
Under the Municipal Corporations Act, boroughs could be given city status. A purely ceremonial designation, such boroughs had "city councils" rather than "borough councils."

The 1868 Amendment Act to the Municipal Corporations Act 1867 enabled certain cities and towns to be designated as cities under said Act; said cities and towns being Auckland, Wellington, Nelson, Christchurch and Dunedin. After the passing of the Municipal Corporations Act 1886, provisions were expanded so that boroughs with at least 20,000 people could also be granted city status.

== List of boroughs ==
Borough	Established	Abolished	Existed for	Granted city status	Successor
Kaitaia	1 September 1945	1 November 1989	44 years	No	Far North District
Kaikohe	1 July 1947	1 November 1989	42 years	No	Far North District
Whangarei	1 October 1896	1 November 1989	93 years	21 May 1964	Whangarei District
Dargaville	1 July 1908	1 November 1989	81 years	No	Kaipara District
Helensville	6 February 1947	1 November 1989	42 years	No	Rodney District
East Coast Bays	1 April 1954	1 November 1989	35 years	1 April 1975	North Shore City
Birkenhead	11 April 1888	1 November 1989	101 years	15 March 1978	North Shore City
Devonport	6 May 1886	1 November 1989	103 years	No	North Shore City
Northcote	1 January 1908	1 November 1989	81 years	No	North Shore City
Takapuna	1 July 1913	1 November 1989	76 years	2 October 1961	North Shore City
Waitemata	1 August 1974	1 November 1989	15 years	1 August 1974	Waitakere City; Rodney District
Glen Eden	1 April 1953	1 November 1989	36 years	No	Waitakere City
Henderson	7 November 1946	1 November 1989	43 years	No	Waitakere City
New Lynn	1 April 1929	1 November 1989	60 years	No	Waitakere City
Avondale	1 April 1922	1 September 1927	5 years	No	Auckland City
Grey Lynn / Newton	7 November 1885	1 July 1914	29 years	No	Auckland City
Auckland	24 April 1871	1 November 1989	118 years	24 April 1871	new Auckland City
Mount Albert	1 April 1911	1 November 1989	78 years	22 August 1978	new Auckland City
Mount Eden	15 August 1906	1 November 1989	83 years	No	new Auckland City
Mount Roskill	2 October 1947	1 November 1989	42 years	No	new Auckland City
Newmarket	5 May 1885	1 November 1989	104 years	No	new Auckland City
Onehunga	19 April 1877	1 November 1989	112 yeats	No	new Auckland City
One Tree Hill	1 April 1930	1 November 1989	59 years	No	new Auckland City
Parnell	19 April 1877	15 February 1913	36 years	No	Auckland City
Ellerslie	1 April 1938	1 November 1989	51 years	No	new Auckland City
Mount Wellington	3 May 1952	19 October 1986	34 years	No	Tamaki Borough
Otahuhu	2 September 1912	19 October 1986	74 years	No	Tamaki Borough
Tamaki	19 October 1986	1 November 1989	3 years	28 January 1987	new Auckland City new Manukau City
Howick	1 April 1952	1 November 1989	37 years	No	new Manukau City
Manurewa	29 October 1937	3 September 1965	28 years	No	Manukau City
Papatoetoe	10 June 1946	1 November 1989	43 years	1 October 1965	new Manukau City
Manukau	3 September 1965	1 November 1989	24 years	3 September 1965	new Manukau City; Papakura District
Papakura	1 April 1938	1 November 1989	51 years	1 January 1975	Papakura District
Tuakau	1 January 1955	1 November 1989	34 years	No	Franklin District
Waiuku	1 January 1955	1 November 1989	34 years	No	Franklin District
Pukekohe	1 April 1912	1 November 1989	77 years	No	Franklin District
Huntly	1 February 1931	1 November 1989	59 years	No	Waikato District
Thames	5 November 1873	1 October 1975	102 years	No	Thames-Coromandel District
Waihi	1 March 1902	1 November 1989	87 years	No	Hauraki District
Paeroa	1 July 1915	1 November 1989	74 years	No	Hauraki District
Ngaruawahia	11 September 1920	1 November 1989	69 years	No	Waikato District
Frankton	28 March 1913	1 April 1917	4 years	No	Hamilton Borough
Hamilton	24 December 1877	1 November 1989	112 years	12 December 1945	new Hamilton City
Matamata	1 April 1935	1 November 1989	54 years	No	Matamata-Piako District
Morrinsville	1 April 1921	1 November 1989	68 years	No	Matamata-Piako District
Te Aroha	2 May 1898	1 November 1989	91 years	No	Matamata-Piako District
Cambridge	19 August 1886	1 November 1989	103 years	No	Waipa District
Te Awamutu	1 April 1915	1 November 1989	74 years	No	Waipa District
Putaruru	1 July 1947	1 November 1989	42 years	No	South Waikato District
Otorohanga	1 October 1953	1 November 1971	18 years	No	Otorohanga County
Tokoroa	1 April 1975	1 November 1989	14 years	No	South Waikato District
Te Kuiti	1 April 1910	1 April 1976	66 years	No	Waitomo District
Taupo	1 October 1953	1 December 1988	36 years	No	Taupo District
Te Puke	1 April 1935	1 November 1989	54 years	No	Western Bay of Plenty District
Mount Maunganui	1 April 1945	1 November 1989	44 years	No	Tauranga District
Tauranga	21 February 1882	1 November 1989	107 years	17 April 1963	Tauranga District
Rotorua	28 September 1922	1 April 1979	57 years	27 April 1962	Rotorua District
Kawerau	1 April 1954	1 April 1989	35 years	No	Kawerau District
Murupara	10 September 1962	1 November 1989	27 years	No	Whakatane District
Whakatane	1 September 1917	1 April 1976	59 years	No	Whakatane District
Opotiki	1 August 1911	1 October 1973	62 years	No	Opotiki County
Gisborne	12 May 1877	1 November 1989	112 years	1 November 1955	Gisborne District
Wairoa	1 October 1909	1 October 1986	77 years	No	Wairoa District
Napier	26 November 1874	1 November 1989	115 years	18 March 1950	new Napier City
Taradale	1 October 1953	1 April 1968	15 years	No	Napier City
Hastings	19 August 1886	1 November 1989	103 years	8 September 1956	Hastings District
Havelock North	1 April 1952	1 November 1989	37 years	No	Hastings District
Waipawa	1 April 1908	1 April 1978	70 years	No	Waipawa District
Waipukurau	12 September 1912	1 April 1977	65 years	No	Waipukurau District
Waitara	6 September 1904	1 October 1986	84 years	No	North Taranaki District
New Plymouth	11 August 1876	1 November 1989	113 years	21 February 1949	New Plymouth District
Eltham	12 October 1901	15 October 1986	85 years	No	Eltham District
Opunake	17 May 1937	1 April 1956	19 years	No	Egmont County
Hawera	2 January 1882	1 October 1978	96 years	No	Hawera District
Inglewood	16 March 1903	11 October 1986	83 years	No	Inglewood District
Patea	13 October 1881	1 April 1987	106 years	No	Patea District
Stratford	1 August 1898	1 April 1989	91 years	No	Stratford District.
Ohakune	1 November 1911	1 April 1988	77 years	No	Waimarino District
Raetihi	1 November 1921	1 April 1988	67 years	No	Waimarino District
Taumarunui	1 September 1910	1 November 1989	79 years	No	Ruapehu District
Wanganui	1 February 1872	1 November 1989	117 years	1 July 1924	Wanganui District
Wanganui East / Eastbrook	1 December 1907	1 January 1913	6 years	No	Wanganui Borough
Marton	19 July 1879	1 November 1989	110 years	No	Rangitikei District
Taihape	1 June 1906	1 November 1989	83 years	No	Rangitikei District
Feilding	7 July 1881	1 November 1989	108 years	No	Manawatu District
Palmerston North	12 July 1877	1 November 1989	112 years	1 August 1930	new Palmerston North City
Dannevirke	10 November 1892	28 April 1987	94 years	No	Dannevirke District
Pahiatua	1 September 1892	1 November 1989	97 years	No	Tararua District
Foxton	18 April 1888	1 November 1989	101 years	No	Horowhenua District
Levin	1 April 1906	1 November 1989	83 years	No	Horowhenua District
Shannon	1 August 1917	1 April 1966	49 years	No	Horowhenua County
Eketahuna	1 April 1907	1 January 1975	68 years	No	Eketahuna County
Woodville	1 July 1887	5 May 1987	102 years	No	Woodville District
Kapiti	2 September 1974	1 November 1989	15 years	No	Kapiti Coast District
Otaki	1 March 1921	1 November 1989	68 years	No	Kapiti Coast District
Porirua	31 August 1962	1 November 1989	27 years	2 October 1965	new Porirua City new Wellington City
Upper Hutt	1 February 1926	1 November 1989	63 years	28 May 1966	new Upper Hutt City
Petone	5 July 1888	1 November 1989	101 years	No	Lower Hutt City
Lower Hutt	1 February 1891	1 November 1989	98 years	1 February 1941	new Lower Hutt City new Wellington City
Eastbourne	1 April 1906	1 November 1989	83 years	No	new Lower Hutt City
Wellington	16 September 1870	1 November 1989	119 years	16 September 1870	new Wellington City
Tawa / Tawa Flat	1 October 1953	1 November 1989	36 years	No	new Wellington City
Karori	7 September 1891	1 April 1920	29 years	No	Wellington City
Melrose	5 March 1888	1 April 1903	15 years	No	Wellington City
Miramar	15 November 1904	1 February 1921	17 years	No	Wellington City
Onslow	13 March 1890	1 April 1919	29 years	No	Wellington City
Masterton	10 July 1877	1 April 1989	112 years	No	Masterton District
Carterton	1 July 1887	1 April 1989	102 years	No	Carterton District
Featherston	1 September 1917	1 November 1989	72 years	No	South Wairarapa District
Greytown	1 December 1878	1 November 1989	111 years	No	South Wairarapa District
Martinborough	1 April 1928	1 November 1989	61 years	No	South Wairarapa District
Motueka	8 December 1899	1 April 1989	89 years	No	Tasman District
Richmond	1 July 1891	1 April 1989	98 years	No	Tasman District
Nelson	30 March 1874	1 November 1989	115 years	30 March 1874	new Nelson City
Blenheim	6 March 1869	1 November 1989	120 years	No	Marlborough District
Picton	9 August 1876	1 November 1989	113 years	No	Marlborough District
Westport	16 April 1873	1 November 1989	116 years	No	Buller District
Brunner	1 November 1887	1 May 1970	83 years	No	Grey County
Greymouth	16 July 1868	1 November 1989	121 years	No	Grey District
Runanga	1 May 1912	1 November 1989	77 years	No	Grey District
Hokitika	24 August 1868	1 November 1989	121 years	No	Westland District
Kumara	23 July 1877	1 April 1969	92 years	No	Westland County
Ross	1 January 1878	1 April 1972	94 years	No	Westland County
Kaiapoi	28 May 1868	1 November 1989	121 years	No	Waimakariri District
Christchurch	28 May 1868	1 November 1989	121 years	20 October 1868	new Christchurch City
Riccarton	1 January 1913	1 November 1989	76 years	No	new Christchurch City
Linwood	22 February 1893	1 April 1903	10 years	No	Christchurch City
New Brighton	1 February 1897	1 April 1941	44 years	No	Christchurch City
St Albans	24 November 1881	1 April 1903	22 years	No	Christchurch City
Spreydon	1 April 1911	1 April 1921	10 years	No	Christchurch City
Sumner	1 June 1891	1 April 1945	54 years	No	Christchurch City
Sydenham	20 September 1877	1 April 1903	26 years	No	Christchurch City
Woolston	27 July 1893	1 November 1921	28 years	No	Christchurch City
Lyttelton	28 May 1868	1 November 1989	121 years	No	Banks Peninsula District
Akaroa	22 July 1876	31 March 1957	81 years	No	Akaroa County
Rangiora	14 May 1878	1 October 1986	108 years	No	Rangiora District
Ashburton	30 July 1878	1 November 1989	111 years	No	Ashburton District
Geraldine	15 December 1904	1 November 1989	85 years	No	Timaru District
Temuka	1 September 1899	1 November 1989	90 years	No	Timaru District
Timaru	13 July 1868	1 November 1989	121 years	5 November 1948	Timaru District
Waimate	8 September 1879	1 April 1989	110 years	No	Waimate District
Oamaru	5 August 1880	1 November 1989	109 years	No	Waitaki District
Hampden	8 September 1879	1 April 1967	88 years	No	Waitaki County
Palmerston	12 November 1877	1 April 1967	90 years	No	Waihemo County
Arrowtown	10 July 1877	1 November 1989	112 years	No	Queenstown-Lakes District
Queenstown	31 October 1877	16 October 1986	109 years	No	Queenstown-Lakes District
Alexandra	1 October 1878	1 November 1989	111 years	No	Central Otago District
Naseby	1 June 1881	1 November 1989	108 years	No	Central Otago District
Roxburgh	14 August 1877	1 November 1989	112 years	No	Central Otago District
Cromwell	16 October 1877	1 November 1989	112 years	No	Central Otago District
Waikouaiti / Hawksbury	28 September 1880	1 April 1966	86 years	No	Waikouaiti County
Dunedin	21 December 1877	1 November 1989	112 years	21 December 1877	new Dunedin City
Green Island	18 January 1878	1 November 1989	111 years	No	new Dunedin City
Mosgiel	1 April 1885	1 November 1989	104 years	No	new Dunedin City
Port Chalmers	19 December 1884	1 November 1989	105 years	No	new Dunedin City
St Kilda	2 August 1877	1 November 1989	112 years	No	new Dunedin City
Caversham	28 May 1877	1 November 1904	27 years	No	Dunedin City
Maori Hill	15 May 1877	1 January 1916	39 years	No	Dunedin City
Mornington	12 May 1877	1 January 1916	39 years	No	Dunedin City
North-East Valley	25 October 1877	15 October 1910	33 years	No	Dunedin City
Roslyn	12 May 1877	1 November 1912	35 years	No	Dunedin City
South Dunedin	23 July 1877	1 April 1905	28 years	No	Dunedin City
West Harbour	20 October 1877	1 May 1963	86 years	No	Dunedin City
Clyde	11 May 1878	21 September 1878	4 months	No	Vincent County
Balclutha	15 November 1877	1 November 1989	112 years	No	Clutha District
Lawrence	11 May 1877	1 November 1989	112 years	No	Clutha District
Tapanui	12 May 1877	1 November 1989	112 years	No	Clutha District
Kaitangata	1 August 1887	17 October 1986	102 years	No	Bruce District
Milton	25 October 1877	17 October 1986	109 years	No	Bruce District
Winton	1 January 1887	1 November 1989	102 years	No	Southland District
Riverton	9 June 1879	1 April 1983	104 years	No	Wallace County
Gore	8 July 1885	1 November 1989	104 years	No	Gore District
Mataura	1 November 1895	1 November 1989	94 years	No	Gore District
North Invercargill	27 July 1880	10 January 1910	30 years	No	Invercargill Borough
Invercargill	3 December 1879	1 November 1989	110 years	1 March 1930	Invercargill District
East Invercargill	12 January 1878	10 January 1910	32 years	No	Invercargill Borough
South Invercargill	29 August 1877	1 June 1956	79 years	No	Invercargill City
Gladstone	26 January 1880	10 January 1910	30 years	No	Invercargill Borough
Avenal	11 May 1878	10 January 1910	32 years	No	Invercargill Borough
Bluff / Campbelltown	27 December 1878	1 November 1989	111 years	No	Invercargill District
