= George Talbot (mayor) =

New Zealand local politician (1834–1911)

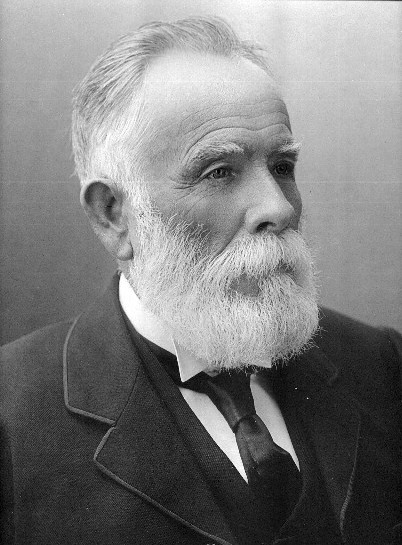
- George Talbot

1st Mayor of Richmond
- In office 1891–1903

Personal details
- Born: 1834 Wyke Regis, Dorset, England
- Died: 3 February 1911 (aged 76–77) Richmond, New Zealand
- Spouse: Frances Cox (m. 1857; died 1907)
- Occupation: local politician
- Profession: farmer

George Talbot (1834 – 3 February 1911) was the first mayor of Richmond in New Zealand from 1891 until his retirement in 1903. A farmer in the nearby Appleby, he was the inaugural head of the Borough of Richmond.

== Early life ==
Talbot was born in Wyke Regis in Dorset, England. He was baptised at baptised at Weymouth on 15 June 1834. Talbot and Frances Cox married at Weymouth on 4 August 1857. His wife was born in 1928 in Weymouth. They arrived in Nelson on the Cresswell on 6 February 1858.

== Community engagement ==
Talbot was a member of a large number of organisations. He held membership of the Board of Education and for many year, he chaired this organisation. He was on the council of Victoria College in Wellington. He was treasurer of Nelson Harbour Board. He held membership of the Hospital and Charitable Aid Board. He was treasurer of the Agricultural and Pastoral Association. Talbot was a justice of the peace. He was a member of the Rocks Road Board.

In Richmond, Talbot was a member of the Richmond District Roads Board. In the second election for the Richmond Town Board, held in September 1888, he became one of the commissioners. The town board successfully campaigned for Richmond to become a borough. When Richmond Borough was formed in 1891, the nomination meeting for the first mayoral election was set for 8 July, but Talbot was the only candidate and he was thus declared elected without opposition. Talbot retained the mayoralty continuously until April 1903, when he announced his retirement. He was unopposed at every annual election.

== Private life and commemoration ==
Talbot had a farm at Appleby and various business interests in Richmond. Around 1872, he had a large house built in Richmond for his family—Dorset House—and moved there in either 1872 or 1897 (sources differ). The Talbots referred to their property as Dorset Place, and it was named after his birth district. The building gave its name to the street in which it stands: Dorset Street. Talbot Street in Richmond is named for him. Dorset House was registed as a Category 2 historic place in 1990.

The Talbots celebrated their golden wedding anniversary in August 1907 and his wife unexpectedly died later that month. He died on 3 February 1911 at Richmond after a period of health problems, and was buried in Richmond Cemetery. Their surviving children were six daughters and two sons.

One of their sons, Alfred George Talbot (1867–1958), became a prominent ophthalmologist who had received his medical training at the University of Edinburgh. The other son became a dental surgeon.

Political offices
New office	Mayor of Richmond; 1891–1903	Succeeded by John Croucher
