= Royce McGlashen =

New Zealand potter, ceramicist

Royce McGlashen MBE
- Born: Royce Peter McGlashen; 1949 (age 75–76); Nelson, New Zealand
- Known for: Ceramics
- Relatives: Muir McGlashen (father); Maurice McGlashen (grandfather)
- Website: www.roycemcglashen.co.nz

Royce Peter McGlashen MBE (born 1949) is a New Zealand ceramicist.

== Early life ==
McGlashen was born in Nelson in 1949, the son of Muir McGlashen who served as mayor of Richmond from 1962 to 1974, and was educated at Waimea College.

== Career ==
In 1966, McGlashen began a five-year apprenticeship with Jack Laird at Waimea Pottery. He moved to Australia where he worked at Montville Pottery in Queensland. In 1974, he travelled to South Africa and then on to England, working at Le Dieu Pottery in Norwich. He returned to New Zealand in 1975. In 1989, he began designing for Temuka Pottery.

== Honours and awards ==
In 1983 and 1987, McGlashen won Merit Awards at the Fletcher Brownbuilt Pottery Awards. In the 1989 New Year Honours, he was appointed a Member of the Order of the British Empire, for services to pottery.
