= John Crawford (potter) =

New Zealand potter

- Born: 1951; Runanga
- Died: 3 February 2012 (aged 60–61)
- Known for: Ceramics

John Crawford (1951 – 3 February 2012) was a New Zealand potter who was born on, and maintained a studio on, the West Coast of New Zealand.

== Life ==
Crawford was born in Runanga in 1951. He attended Greymouth High School, where he met Yvonne Rust, who was the art teacher at that time. She encouraged him to train under Jack Laird at Waimea Craft Pottery in Nelson.

From 1969 to 1974 he was trained as a potter at Waimea. In this studio workshop, run the style of Bernard Leach, he learned to use a wheel, glazing, and firing.

In 1974 he set up a studio in Ngakawau, a small settlement 30 km north of Westport. Hector Pottery was operated collaboratively by John and his wife Anne, who had also done her training at Waimea Craft Pottery.

== Artistic career ==
Crawford's work encompassed three areas: wheel-thrown functional earthenware, figurative sculptural pieces, and works on paper; he considered these were interdependent, with representations from his drawings finding their way into his sculptures.

In 1986 Crawford was the New Zealand guest potter at the first National Australian Ceramics Symposium in Canberra. He was a committee member of the New Zealand Society of Potters, and president from 1985 to 1988.

In 1989, with the help of a Queen Elizabeth II Arts Council grant, Crawford prepared a solo exhibition at the Suter Art Gallery in Nelson. He fired thousands of porcelain pebbles, 30 mm across and 10 mm thick, painted, numbered, and arranged in 2 x 1.5 m area.

== Collections ==
Crawford's work is in the collection of the Suter Art Gallery, the Southland Museum and Art Gallery in Invercargill, and the Auckland Institute and Museum's Auckland Studio Potters Collection. Pieces are also owned by the NZ Ministry of Foreign Affairs in Paris, the Myer Foundation in Australia, and New Zealand's Korean Embassy.

== Exhibitions ==
- 1974: Suter Art Gallery
- The Bowl. 1981: Crafts Council of New Zealand, Wellington
- 1983: World Crafts Exhibition, Canada
- Winstone Ties That Bind. 1985: Crafts Council of New Zealand, Wellington
- New Zealand Potters. 1986: Gallery Eight, La Jolla, California
- Ceramics '86. 1986: Govett-Brewster Art Gallery, New Plymouth
- Spheres. 1986: New Zealand Society of Potters, Southland Museum, Invercargill
- 1989: Suter Art Gallery
