= List of former local authorities in New Zealand =

The history of local government in New Zealand can be broadly grouped into three periods, these being the provincial era (1841–1876), the boroughs and counties era (1876–1989), and the districts and regions era (the current era, since 1989).

== Provincial era (until 1876) ==
The original three provinces were established in 1841 by Royal Charter. The New Zealand Constitution Act 1846 reduced the number of provinces to two. The New Zealand Constitution Act 1852 re-divided New Zealand into six provinces, and four additional provinces emerged during the remainder of the Provincial Era. This era came to end with the Abolition of Provinces Act 1876.

Province	Established	Disestablished	Notes
Auckland	1853	1876	
Canterbury	1853	1876	
Hawke's Bay	1858	1876	Formerly part of Wellington Province
Marlborough	1859	1876	Formerly part of Nelson Province
Nelson	1853	1876	
New Leinster	1841	1846	New Zealand Constitution Act 1846
New Munster	1841	1853	New Zealand Constitution Act 1852
New Plymouth	1853	1876	Renamed "Taranaki" in 1859
New Ulster	1841	1853	New Zealand Constitution Act 1852
Otago	1853	1876	
Southland	1861	1870	Originally part of, and later reunited with, Otago Province
Wellington	1853	1876	
Westland	1873	1876	Independent (Westland County) from 1868, and before that part of Canterbury Province

== Post-provincial era (1876–1989) ==
After New Zealand abolished its provinces in 1876, a system of counties similar to other countries' systems was instituted, lasting with little change (except mergers and other localised boundary adjustments) until 1989 when they were reorganised into district councils within a system of larger regions.

The Local Government Act 1974 began the process of bringing urban, mixed, and rural councils into the same legislative framework. Substantial reorganisations under that Act resulted in a shake-up in 1989, which abolished all the counties except for the Chatham Islands County, which survived under that name for a further 6 years but then became a "Territory" under the "Chatham Islands Council".

=== Borough councils ===
New Zealand formerly used the term borough to designate self-governing towns of more than 1,000 people, although 19th century census records show many boroughs with populations as low as 200. Note: most of the links go to the area, rather than information about the body referenced.

Council	Established	Disestablished	Area	Notes
Akaroa				
Alexandra	1867	1989	1.92 km^{2} (470 acres) (1986)	Merged into Central Otago District
Arrowtown	10 May 1877	1989	170 acres (0.69 km^{2}) (1877); 1.92 km^{2} (470 acres) (1986)	Merged into Queenstown-Lakes District
Ashburton	9 September 1878	1989	12.27 km^{2} (4.74 sq mi) (1986)	Merged into Ashburton District
Auckland	1851	1871		Declared a city.
Avenal	1876	1909		Amalgamated with Invercargill Borough
Avondale	1922	1927		Amalgamated with Auckland City
Balclutha	1870	1989	568 acres (2.30 km^{2}) (1877); 5.26 km^{2} (1,300 acres) (1986)	Merged into Clutha District
Birkenhead	1888	1978		Proclaimed a city on 15 March 1978
Blenheim	1869	1989	17.68 km^{2} (6.83 sq mi) (1986)	Merged into Marlborough District
Bluff	1917	1989	8.67 km^{2}	Merged into Invercargill city. See Campbelltown below.
Brunner	1887	1971 (Note: Brunner Borough is last listed in the 1971 Yearbook)	23 km^{2} (5,700 acres) (1969)	Amalgamated with Grey County
Cambridge	1886	1989	9.65 km^{2}	Merged into Waipa District
Caversham	1877	1904	4.34 km^{2}	Amalgamated with Dunedin city
Campbelltown	1878	1917	8.67 km^{2}	Formally renamed Bluff (see above)
Carterton	1887	1989	39.81 km^{2}	Grew into Carterton District
Cromwell	1866	1989	33.3 km^{2}	Merged into Central Otago District
Dannevirke	1892	1987	5.62 km^{2}	In 1987 merged with Dannevirke County to form Dannevirke District, which merged into Tararua District in 1989
Dargaville	1908	1989	11.33 km^{2}	Merged into Kaipara District
Devonport	1886	1989	5.79 km^{2}	Merged into North Shore City
Dunedin South		1908		Amalgamated with Dunedin city
Eastbourne	1905	1989	12.95 km^{2}	Merged into Lower Hutt City
East Coast Bays	1954	1975		Proclaimed a city on 1 April 1975
East Invercargill	1876	1909		Amalgamated with Invercargill Borough
Eketahuna	1907	fl. 1972		Merged into Eketahuna County
Ellerslie	1938	1989	3.01 km^{2}	Merged into Auckland City
Eltham	1901	1989	6.47 km^{2}	Merged into South Taranaki District
Featherston	1917	1989	3.07 km^{2}	Merged into South Wairarapa District
Feilding	1881	1989	8.52 km^{2}	Merged into Manawatū District
Foxton	1883	1989	3.07 km^{2}	Merged into Horowhenua District
Geraldine	1904	1989	3.22 km^{2}	Merged into Timaru District
Gladstone	1876	1909		Amalgamated with Invercargill Borough
Glen Eden	fl. 1972	1989	4.95 km^{2}	Merged into Waitakere City
Gore	1885	1989	9.43 km^{2}	Merged into Gore District
Green Island	1875	1989	7.28 km^{2}	Merged into Dunedin City
Grey Lynn	1899	1914		Amalgamated with Auckland City
Greymouth	1868	1989	10.48 km^{2}	Merged into Grey District
Greytown	1878	1989	4.45 km^{2}	Merged into South Wairarapa District
Hampden	1879	1967		Amalgamated with Waitaki County
Hastings	1886	1956		Elevated to City
Havelock North	1952	1989	5.63 km^{2}	Merged into Hastings District
Hawera		fl. 1972		
Helensville	1947	1989	5.32 km^{2}	Merged into Rodney District
Henderson	1946	1989	66.7 km^{2}	Merged into Waitakere City
Hokitika	1868	1989	35.7 km^{2}	Merged into Westland District
Howick	1952	1989	6.21 km^{2}	Merged into Manukau City
Huntly	1931	1989	9.3 km^{2}	Merged into Waikato District
Inglewood	1902	1986	2.83 km^{2}	Merged into Inglewood District 1986 Merged into New Plymouth District 1989
Invercargill	1871	1930		Elevated to City
Kaiapoi	1868	1989	4.66 km^{2}	Merged into Waimakariri District
Kaikohe	1947	1989	5.44 km^{2}	Merged into Far North District
Kaitaia	1922	1989	6.95 km^{2}	Merged into Far North District
Kaitangata	1882	1989	3.64 km^{2}	Merged into Clutha District
Kapiti	1974	1989	160.64 km^{2}	Merged into Kāpiti Coast District
Karori	1891	1920		Amalgamated with Wellington City
Kawerau	1954	1989	21.74 km^{2}	Changed to Kawerau District
Kumara	1877	1969 (Note: Kumara Borough is last listed in the 1969 Yearbook)	3.41 km^{2} (842 acres) (1969)	Merged into Hokitika Borough
Lawrence	1866	1989	2.95 km^{2}	Merged into Clutha District
Levin	1906	1989	12.95 km^{2}	Merged into Horowhenua District
Linwood	22 February 1893	1 April 1903		Amalgamated with Christchurch city
Lower Hutt	1891	1941		Elevated to City
Lyttelton	28 May 1868	1989	10.36 km^{2}	Merged into Banks Peninsula District
Maori Hill	1876	1915	14.97 km^{2}	Amalgamated with Dunedin City
Manurewa	1937	1965		Merged into Manukau City
Martinborough	1928	1989	4.33 km^{2}	Merged into South Wairarapa District
Marton	1879	1989	5.72 km^{2}	Merged into Rangitikei District
Masterton	1877	1989	17.96 km^{2}	Merged into Masterton District
Matamata	1935	1989	5.33 km^{2}	Merged into Matamata-Piako District
Mataura	1895	1989	5.15 km^{2}	Merged into Gore District
Melrose	1888	1903		Amalgamated with Wellington City
Milton	1866	1989	3.88 km^{2}	Merged into Clutha District
Miramar	8 November 1904	April 1921		Amalgamated with Wellington City
Mornington	1877	1915	2.65 km^{2}	Amalgamated with Dunedin City
Morrinsville	1921	1989	4.76 km^{2}	Merged into Matamata-Piako District
Mosgiel	1884	1989	7.87 km^{2}	Merged into Dunedin City
Motueka	1900	1989	47.9 km^{2}	Merged into Tasman District
Mount Albert	1911	1978		Became Mount Albert City
Mount Eden	1906	1989	5.98 km^{2}	Merged into Auckland City
Mount Maunganui	1945	1989	19.11 km^{2}	Merged into Tauranga City
Mount Roskill	1947	1989	18.62 km^{2}	Merged into Auckland City
Mount Wellington	1952	1986	16.72 km^{2}	Merged with Otahuhu borough to become Tamaki City
Murupara	1962	1989	30.0 km^{2}	Merged into Whakatane District
Napier	1874	1950		Elevated to City
Naseby	1872	1989	0.73 km^{2}	Merged into Central Otago District
New Brighton	1897	1941		Amalgamated with Christchurch city
New Lynn	1910	1989	5.63 km^{2}	Merged into Waitakere City
Newmarket	1885	1989	0.79 km^{2}	Amalgamated with Auckland City
Newton	1885	1899		Renamed Grey Lynn Borough.
Ngaruawahia	1920	1989	5.18 km^{2}	Merged into Waikato District
Northcote	1908	1989	5.40 km^{2}	Merged into North Shore City
North East Valley	1877	1910	16.11 km^{2}	Amalgamated with Dunedin City
North Invercargill	1876	1909		Amalgamated with Invercargill Borough
Oamaru	1866	1989	7.43 km^{2}	Merged into Waitaki District
Ohakune	1911	1989	8.41 km^{2}	Merged into Ruapehu District
Onehunga	1877	1989	7.60 km^{2}	Merged into Auckland City
One Tree Hill	1930	1989	9.83 km^{2}	Merged into Auckland City
Onslow	13 March 1890	1 April 1919		Amalgamated with Wellington City
Opotiki	1911	1973		Amalgamated with Opotiki County
Otahuhu	1912	1986	5.74 km^{2}	Merged with Mount Wellington borough to become Tamaki City
Otaki	1921	1989	43.20 km^{2}	Merged into Kāpiti Coast District
Paeroa	1915	1989	5.75 km^{2}	Merged into Hauraki District
Pahiatua	1892	1989	2.91 km^{2}	Merged into Tararua District
Palmerston	1872	1966		
Papakura	1 April 1938	1975		Constituted a city on 1 January 1975
Papatoetoe	1946	5 October 1965		Elevated to city
Parnell	1877	1913		Amalgamated with Auckland City
Patea	1881	1989	5.75 km^{2}	Merged into South Taranaki District
Petone	1888	1989	10.28 km^{2}	Merged into Lower Hutt City
Picton	1876	1989	4.24 km^{2}	Merged into Marlborough District
Porirua	31 August 1962	2 October 1965		Elevated to City
Port Chalmers	1866	1989	4.01 km^{2}	Merged into Dunedin City
Pukekohe	1905	1989	14.05 km^{2}	Merged into Franklin District
Putaruru	1926	1989	3.94 km^{2}	Merged into South Waikato District
Queenstown	1866	1986	4.21 km^{2}	Merged with Lake County to form Queenstown-Lakes District
Raetihi	1921	1989	3.88 km^{2}	Merged into Ruapehu District
Rangiora	1871	1986	3.56 km^{2}	Amalgamated with Rangiora County to form Rangiora District.
Riccarton	1913	1989	2.83 km^{2}	Merged into Christchurch City
Richmond	1891	1989	10.52 km^{2}	Merged into Tasman District
Riverton	1871	1983		
Roslyn	1877	1912	8.09 km^{2}	Amalgamated with Dunedin City
Ross	1878	1972		Amalgamated with Westland County
Roxburgh	1874	1989	2.08 km^{2}	Merged into Central Otago District
Runanga	1912	1989	4.80 km^{2}	Merged into Grey District
St Albans	24 November 1881	1 April 1903		Amalgamated with Christchurch city
Saint Kilda	1875	1989	2.47 km^{2}	Merged into Dunedin City
South Dunedin	1875	1905	1.67 km^{2}	Amalgamated with Dunedin City
South Invercargill	1877	1956		Amalgamated with Invercargill City
Spreydon	1 April 1911	1921		Amalgamated with Christchurch City.
Stratford	1898	1989	8.16 km^{2}	Merged into Stratford District
Sumner	1891	1 April 1945		Amalgamated with Christchurch city
Sydenham	20 September 1877	1 April 1903		Amalgamated with Christchurch city
Taihape	1906	1989	7.78 km^{2}	Merged into Rangitikei District
Takapuna	1913	1961		Elevated to city
Tapanui	1876	1989	1.21 km^{2}	Merged into Clutha District
Taradale	1953	1968		Amalgamated with Napier City
Taumarunui	1910	1989	15.7 km^{2}	Merged into Ruapehu District
Taupo	fl. 1972	1989	33.85 km^{2}	Merged into Taupō District
Tauranga	1882	1963	km^{2}	Elevated to city
Tawa	fl. 1972	1989	6.94 km^{2}	Merged into Wellington City
Te Aroha	1898	1989	31.8 km^{2}	Merged into Matamata-Piako District
Te Awamutu	1915	1989	7.13 km^{2}	Merged into Waipa District
Te Kuiti		fl. 1972		
Temuka	1899	1989	4.05 km^{2}	Merged into Timaru District
Te Puke	1935	1989	5.34 km^{2}	Merged into Western Bay of Plenty District
Thames		fl. 1972		
Timaru	13 July 1868	1948		Elevated to city
Tokoroa	1975	1989	13.25 km^{2}	Merged into South Waikato District
Tuakau	fl. 1972	1989	4.42 km^{2}	Merged into Franklin District
Upper Hutt	1 February 1928	2 May 1966		City of Upper Hutt proclaimed
Waihi	1902	1989	5.4 km^{2}	Merged into Hauraki District
Waikouaiti	1866	1966		Known as West Hawksbury until 1909
Waimate	1879	1989	3.12 km^{2}	Merged into Waimate District
Waipawa		fl. 1972		Merged into Central Hawke's Bay District
Waipukurau		fl. 1972		Merged into Central Hawke's Bay District
Wairoa	1909	1989	6.59 km^{2}	Merged into Wairoa District
Waitara	1904	1989	6.32 km^{2}	Merged into New Plymouth District
Waiuku		1989	5.93 km^{2}	Merged into Franklin District
Wanganui	1872	1924		Elevated to city
West Harbour	1877	1963		Western part amalgamated with Dunedin City, eastern part amalgamated with Waikouaiti County
Westport	1873	1989	3.44 km^{2}	Merged into Buller District
Whakatane	1917	1976	km^{2}	Amalgamated with Whakatane County to form Whakatane District
Winton	1877	1989	2.36 km^{2}	Amalgamated with three other local authorities in 1989 to form Southland District.
Woodville	1887	1989	4.25 km^{2}	Merged into Tararua District
Woolston	27 July 1893	1921		Amalgamated with Christchurch City.

=== Cities ===
Prior to 1989, any borough with a population exceeding 20,000 could proclaim itself a city. As part of the restructuring, many provincial cities were combined with surrounding rural counties to form districts. For example, Hastings became a district, although its population is greater than nearby city Napier, which did not acquire any rural areas. The term city is still used informally for all large towns. Rotorua was a city from 1962 until 1979, when it amalgamated with Rotorua County to become Rotorua District. New Zealand's first city was Christchurch, proclaimed by royal charter in 1856. Cities continued to exist in the Auckland Region until 2010, when Auckland City, North Shore City, Waitakere City, Manukau City were merged with the surrounding districts into a single unitary authority.

Council	Established	Disestablished	Area	Notes
Auckland City	1871	2010	637 square kilometres (246 sq mi)	Merged into Auckland Council
Birkenhead	1978	1989	12.66 square kilometres (4.89 sq mi)	Merged into North Shore City
East Coast Bays	1975	1989	15.59 square kilometres (6.02 sq mi)	Merged into North Shore City
Gisborne	1956	1989	26.28 square kilometres (10.15 sq mi)	Merged into Gisborne District
Hastings	1956	1989	19.46 square kilometres (7.51 sq mi)	Merged into Hastings District
Manukau City	1965	2010	683 square kilometres (264 sq mi)	Merged into Auckland Council
Mount Albert City	1978	1989	9.83 square kilometres (3.80 sq mi)	Merged into Auckland City
New Plymouth	1949	1989		Merged into New Plymouth District
North Shore City	1989	2010	129.81 square kilometres (50.12 sq mi)	Merged into Auckland Council
Papakura	1975	1989	13.95 square kilometres (5.39 sq mi)	Merged into Papakura District
Papatoetoe	1965	1989	9.03 square kilometres (3.49 sq mi)	Merged into Manukau City
Rotorua	1962	1979		Merged into Rotorua District
Takapuna	1961	1989	114 square kilometres (44 sq mi)	Merged into North Shore City
Tamaki	1986	1989		Merged into Auckland City
Timaru	1948	1989	22.84 square kilometres (8.82 sq mi)	Merged into Timaru District
Waitakere City	1989	2010	367 square kilometres (142 sq mi)	Merged into Auckland Council
Waitemata City	1974	1989	378.29 square kilometres (146.06 sq mi)	Merged into Waitakere City
Wanganui	1924	1989	33.93 square kilometres (13.10 sq mi)	Merged into Wanganui District
Whangarei	1964	1989	292.79 square kilometres (113.05 sq mi)	Merged into Whangarei District

=== Counties ===
When the provinces were abolished in 1876, 63 counties were established to govern rural areas. There were subdivisions and amalgamations over the next 113 years, with as many as 129 counties existing at once. Note that the designation of an area as a county often predated the formation of a county council. In the interim there was often a roads board as the only form of local administration. Fiord and Sounds counties never formed county councils, due to insufficient population to govern.

County	Established	Disestablished	Area	Headquarters	Notes
Akaroa	1876	1989	440.48 km^{2}	Duvauchelle	Merged into Banks Peninsula District
Akitio	1899	1976		Pongaroa	Merged into Dannevirke County
Amuri	1876	1989	11,000 km^{2}	Culverden	Merged into Hurunui District
Ashburton	1876	1989	6174 km^{2}	Ashburton	
Ashley	1876	1977		Rangiora until 1968 then Balcairn	Amalgamated with Waipara County to form Hurunui County.
Awakino	1913	1922			Amalgamated with Waitomo to form Otorohanga County
Awatere	fl. 1952	1976			Merged into Marlborough County
Bay of Islands	1876	1989	2132.5 km^{2}	Kawakawa	
Bruce	1876	1989	1347.4 km^{2}	Milton	Merged into Clutha District
Buller	1876	1989	15,000 km^{2}	Westport	
Castlepoint	1900	1958		Tīnui	
Chatham Islands	1901	1989	963 km^{2}	Waitangi	
Cheviot	1876	1989	847.28 km^{2}	Cheviot	Merged into Hurunui District
Clifton	1885	1989	1175.9 km^{2}	Waitara	Merged into New Plymouth District.
Clutha	1876	1989	2683.2 km^{2}	Balclutha	Merged into Clutha District
Collingwood	1876	1956			Amalgamated with Takaka County to form Golden Bay County.
Cook	1876	1989	2729.4 km^{2}	Gisborne	Merged into Gisborne District
Coromandel	1876	1975			Amalgamated with Thames to form Thames-Coromandel District
Dannevirke	1907	1989	2217.8 km^{2}	Dannevirke	Merged into Tararua District
East Taupo	1876				
Eden	1876	1940			Amalgamated with Auckland City
Egmont	1902	1989	621.86 km^{2}	Ōpunake	Merged into South Taranaki District
Eketahuna	1899	1989	8.29 km^{2}	Eketahuna	Merged into Tararua District
Ellesmere	1910	1989	1200.4 km^{2}	Leeston	Merged into Selwyn District
Eltham	1906	1989	1388.8 km^{2}	Eltham	Merged into South Taranaki District
Eyre	1912	1989	457.8 km^{2}	Kaiapoi in 1952, later Eyreton	Merged into Waimakariri District
Featherston	1902	1989	2471.9 km^{2}	Martinborough	
Fiord	1876	1981	km^{2}		Amalgamated with Wallace County in 1981, at which time it was "the only one of 105 counties where the Counties Act (1956) is not wholly in force"
Franklin	1912	1989	1471.7 km^{2}	Pukekohe	Merged into Franklin District
Geraldine	1876		km^{2}		Amalgamated with Levels County to form Strathallan County
Golden Bay	1956	1989	2661 km^{2}	Takaka	
Great Barrier Island	1913	1989	2.85 km^{2}		
Grey	1876	1989	4091 km^{2}	Greymouth	
Halswell	1910	1968		Halswell	Amalgamated with Paparua County
Hauraki Plains	1920	1989	601.1 km^{2}	Ngatea	
Hawera			km^{2}		
Hawke's Bay	1876	1989	4828 km^{2}	Napier	
Heathcote	1910	1989	31.09 km^{2}		Merged into Christchurch City
Hobson	1876	1989	1929.5 km^{2}	Aratapu until 1909, then Dargaville	Merged into Kaipara District
Hokianga	1876	1989	1588 km^{2}	Rawene	
Horowhenua	1884	1989	1422 km^{2}	Levin	Amalgamated with other entities to form Horowhenua District
Hurunui	1977	1989	3640 km^{2}	Amberley	Merged into Hurunui District
Hutt	1876	1989	6690 km^{2}	Initially Wellington, later Wainuiomata	Between 1908 and 1962 the Makara riding was a separate county. On 1 April 1973, parts were transferred to Porirua, Upper Hutt and Wellington cities. In 1988, the Horokiri riding was amalgamated with Porirua City, Wainuiomata riding with Lower Hutt City and Heretaunga-Pinehaven Community with Upper Hutt City, while the balance went to form part of the Kāpiti Coast District.
Inangahua	1876	1989	2440.8 km^{2}	Reefton	
Inglewood	1920	1986	535.22 km^{2}	Inglewood	Merged into Inglewood District 1986 Merged into New Plymouth District 1989
Kaikoura	1876	1989	2347.5 km^{2}	Kaikoura	
Kairanga	1901	1988	466.2 km^{2}	Palmerston North	Amalgamated with Manawatu County to form Manawatū District
Kaitieke	1910	1956		Raurimu	Amalgamated with Taumarunui County
Kawhia	1905	1956		Kawhia	Merged with Otorohanga District Council
Kiwitea	1893	1989	930.2 km^{2}	Kimbolton	Merged into Manawatū District
Kowai	1912	1968		Balcairn	Amalgamated with Ashley County
Lake	1876	1986	10000 km^{2}	Queenstown	Merged with Queenstown Borough to form Queenstown-Lakes District
Levels	1894	1974	km^{2}		Amalgamated with Geraldine County to form Strathallan County
MacKenzie	1883	1989	7386.6 km^{2}	Fairlie	
Makara	1908	1961			Formed from the Makara Riding of Hutt County. Remnant amalgamated with Hutt County when Porirua Borough established.
Malvern	1912	1989	4973 km^{2}	Darfield	Merged into Selwyn District
Manawatu	1876	1988	686.6 km^{2}	Sanson	Amalgamated with Kairanga County to form Manawatū District
Mangonui	1876	1989	2487 km^{2}	Kaitaia	
Maniototo	1876	1989	3471 km^{2}	Ranfurly	Became part of Central Otago District
Manukau	1876		km^{2}		
Marlborough	1876	1989	10478 km^{2}	Blenheim	Merged with Blenheim Borough and Picton Borough Marlborough District
Masterton	1900	1989	2410 km^{2}	Masterton	Merged with Masterton Borough to form Masterton District
Matakaoa	fl. 1952			Te Araroa	
Matamata	fl. 1952	1989		Tirau	The northern portion became part of Piako District
Mauriceville	1899		km^{2}		
Mount Herbert	1902	1989	171.01 km^{2}	Lyttelton	Merged into Banks Peninsula District
Murchison	1 April 1909	1989		Murchison	Merged into Tasman District
Ohinemuri	1885	1989	624.45 km^{2}	Paeroa	
Ohura	1908	1956		Ohura	Amalgamated with Taumarunui County
Opotiki	1899	1989	3474.65 km^{2}	Opotiki	
Oroua	1903	1989	492.3 km^{2}	Feilding	Merged into Manawatū District
Otamatea	1887	1989	1090.85 km^{2}	Paparoa	Merged into Kaipara District
Otorohanga	1922	1989	1976 km^{2}	Ōtorohanga	Formed from parts of Waitomo County and West Taupo County in 1922. Assimilated part of Kawhia County 1956
Oxford	1912	1989	823.96 km^{2}	Oxford	
Pahiatua	1888	1989	736.3 km^{2}	Pahiatua	
Paparua	1912	1989	448.18 km^{2}		Divided between Christchurch City and Selwyn District
Patangata	1885	1974	km^{2}		Merged into Waipukurau County
Patea	1876	1989	1531 km^{2}	Pātea	Merged into South Taranaki District
Peninsula	1877	1968	km^{2}		More or less inactive until reconstituted in 1926. Amalgamated with Dunedin City in 1967.
Piako	1876	1989	1171 km^{2}	Te Aroha	Merged into Matamata-Piako District
Pohangina	1894	1989	671 km^{2}	Ashhurst	Merged into Manawatū District and Palmerston North City
Raglan	1876	1989	2412.3 km^{2}	Ngāruawāhia	Merged into Waikato District
Rangiora	1912	1986		Rangiora	Amalgamated with Rangiora borough to form Rangiora District.
Rangitikei	1876	1989	4490 km^{2}	Marton	
Rodney	1876	1989	23.34 km^{2}	Orewa	Part merged into Kaipara District
Rotorua		1979	2615 km^{2}	Rotorua	Became Rotorua District
Selwyn	1876	1910			Subdivided into ten smaller counties.
Silverpeaks	1977	1989	3289 km^{2}	Dunedin	Formed in 1977 by the merger of Taieri County and Waikouaiti County.
Sounds	1876	1965			Merged into Marlborough District 1989. A Sounds County Council was never established
Southland	1876	1989	9590 km^{2}	Invercargill	Amalgamated with three other local authorities in 1989 to form Southland District.
Springs	1910	1989		Lincoln	Merged into Selwyn District
Stewart Island	1876	1989	1750 km^{2}	Halfmoon Bay	Amalgamated with three other local authorities in 1989 to form Southland District.
Stratford	1890	1989	2163.56 km^{2}	Stratford	
Strathallan	1974	1989	2571.8 km^{2}	Timaru	
Taieri	1877	1977		Outram	Amalgamated with Waikouaiti County to form Silverpeaks County.
Takaka		1956		Takaka	Amalgamated with Collingwood County to form Golden Bay County.
Taranaki	1876	1989	588.17 km^{2}	New Plymouth	
Taumarunui	1921	1989	4895 km^{2}	Taumarunui	Took in Kaitieke County and Ohura County in 1952
Taupo	1954	1989	7282 km^{2}	Taupō	
Tauranga	1876	1989	1829.3 km^{2}	Tauranga	
Tawera					
Thames	1876	1975		Thames	Amalgamated with Coromandel County to form Thames/Coromandel District
Tuapeka	1876	1989	3586 km^{2}	Lawrence	
Uawa	1918	1964		Tolaga Bay	Separated from Cook County 10 December 1918. Amalgamated with Cook County 1 April 1964.
Vincent	1876	1989	7553 km^{2}	Clyde	Became part of Central Otago District
Waiapu	1890	1989	2817.9 km^{2}	Te Puia Springs	
Waiheke	1970	1989	155.32 km^{2}	Ostend	
Waihemo	1882	1989	872.83 km^{2}	Palmerston	Merged into Waitaki District
Waikato	1876	1989	1651 km^{2}	Hamilton	Merged into Waikato District
Waikohu	1908	1989	2646.96 km^{2}	Te Karaka	
Waikouaiti	1877	1977	km^{2}		Amalgamated with Taieri County to form Silverpeaks County.
Waimairi County	1909	1982		Papanui	Redesignated Waimairi District
Waimarino	1902	1988	2249 km^{2}	Raetihi	Amalgamated with Raetihi Borough and Ohakune Borough to form Waimarino District
Waimate	1876	1989	3585 km^{2}	Waimate	
Waimate West	1908	1989	215.05 km^{2}	Manaia	
Waimea	1876	1989	7547 km^{2}	Richmond	
Waipa	1876	1989	1101 km^{2}	Te Awamutu	
Waipara	1909	1977		Waikari	Amalgamated with Ashley County to form Hurunui County.
Waipawa	1876	1977		Waipawa	Amalgamated with Waipawa Borough to form Waipawa District
Waipukurau		1977		Waipukurau	Amalgamated with Waipukurau Borough to form Waipukurau District
Wairarapa East	1876				
Wairarapa South	1877	1989	1140 km^{2}	Carterton	Merged with Carterton Borough to form Carterton District
Wairarapa West	1876				
Wairewa	1910	1989	440.5 km^{2}	Little River	
Wairoa	1876	1989	4096.5 km^{2}	Wairoa	
Waitaki	1876	1989	6192.7 km^{2}	Oamaru	Created in 1876 but first Council did not meet until 1877
Waitemata	1876				
Waitomo					
Waitotara	1884	1989	1205.5 km^{2}	Wanganui	
Wallace	1876	1989	17520 km^{2}	Riverton to 1898, thereafter Otautau	Amalgamated with three other local authorities in 1989 to form Southland District.
Wanganui	1876	1989	1191 km^{2}	Wanganui	
Weber	1902	1956	km^{2}	Dannevirke	Merged into Dannevirke County
Wellington	?	?	km^{2}	?	See Hutt County or Makara County for counties near Wellington.
West Taupo	1876		1,610 km^{2}		West Taupo County Council was never set up. The area remained under road and town boards and government departments, until split between Taumarunui County Council, Kaitieke County Council and Taumarunui Town Board by the Waikato and King-country Counties Act 1921-1922. In 1921 the West Taupo area had 1,438 people living in 621 mi^{2} (1,610 km^{2}).
Westland	1876	1989	11000 km^{2}	Hokitika	
Whakatane	1876		km^{2}	Whakatane	
Whangamomona			km^{2}		
Whangarei	1876	1989	2681.8 km^{2}	Kamo	Part merged into Kaipara District
Whangaroa	1876	1989	621.6 km^{2}	Kaeo	Merged into Far North District
Woodville	1901	1987	404.2 km^{2}	Woodville	Amalgamated with Woodville Borough to form Woodville District

=== Districts ===
From the 1970s onwards some local authorities created by a voluntary amalgamation of two or more component local authorities were termed Districts. These Districts were of a mixed rural/urban character but are not to be confused with the Districts created by the local government reorganisation of 1989.

Council	Established	Disestablished	Area	Notes
Hawera	1978	fl. 1986		
Otorohanga	1979	1989		Previously called Otorohanga County
Queenstown-Lakes	fl. 1986			
Rangiora	1978	fl. 1986		
Rotorua	1979	fl. 1986		
Thames-Coromandel	1975	fl. 1986		
Waimairi	1982	fl. 1986		
Waimarino	1988	1989		Amalgamation of Raetihi Borough, Ohakune Borough and Waimarino County
Waipawa	1978	1989		Amalgamated with Waipukurau District to form Central Hawke's Bay District
Waipukurau	1977	1989		Amalgamated with Waipawa District to form Central Hawke's Bay District
Waitomo	1976	fl. 1986		
Whakatane	1976	fl. 1986		

=== Town districts ===
A town district, as created under the Town Boards Act of 1882 was a municipality intermediate in nature between a county town and a borough. In 1952, a dependent town district could be established on the petition of two thirds of the resident householders of any settlement of at least fifty households in an area of not more than two square miles (5.18 km^{2}). To become an independent town district, a town district must have had a population of greater than 500.

Council	Established	Disestablished	Area	Notes
Bay	1905	1916		Amalgamated with Dunedin City
Bulls	fl. 1952		2.74 km^{2}	
Cambridge	1882	1886		Elevated to borough
Carterton	1875	1887		Elevated to borough.
Dannevirke	1885	1892		Elevated to borough.
Edendale	fl. 1952	fl. 1972	2.82 km^{2}	Dependent Town District within Southland County
Eltham	1884	1901		Elevated to borough
Glen Eden	1921	fl. 1952	5.12 km^{2}	
Gordon		1890		Amalgamated with Gore borough
Grey	1886	1907		Amalgamated with Taieri County
Havelock	fl. 1952		0.85 km^{2}	
Henderson	1922	1946		Elevated to borough
Helensville	1883	1947		Elevated to borough
Hikurangi	1908	fl. 1986	3.88 km^{2}	Independent Town District within Whangarei County
Howick	1922	1952		Elevated to borough
Hunterville	fl. 1952	fl. 1972	3.20 km^{2}	Independent Town District within Rangitikei County
Huntly	1908	1931		Elevated to borough
Johnsonville	1874	1953	3.41 km^{2}	Amalgamated with Wellington City
Kaikohe	1927	1947		Elevated to borough
Kamo	fl. 1952		3.44 km^{2}	
Kaponga	fl. 1952	fl. 1972	2.26 km^{2}	Dependent Town District within Eltham County
Kawakawa	fl. 1952	fl. 1972	1.13 km^{2}	Independent Town District within Bay of Islands County
Kawhia	fl. 1952		1.90 km^{2}	
Kihikihi	fl. 1952	fl. 1972	2.59 km^{2}	Dependent Town District within Waipa County
Kohukohu	fl. 1952		4.13 km^{2}	
Leamington	1905	1956	5.38 km^{2}	Merged with Cambridge borough.
Leeston	fl. 1952		1.58 km^{2}	
Linwood	28 October 1882	1893		Elevated to borough
Lumsden	fl. 1952		5.12 km^{2}	
Manaia	1882	fl. 1986	2.06 km^{2}	Independent Town District within Waimate West County
Mangaweka	fl. 1952		3.86 km^{2}	
Manunui	fl. 1952			
Martinborough	1906	1928		Elevated to borough
Marton	1869	1879		Elevated to borough
Matamata	1917	1935		Elevated to borough
Mercer	fl. 1952		4.05 km^{2}	
Moa	1885	1902		Elevated to borough and renamed Inglewood
Morrinsville	1908	1921		Elevated to borough
Mosgiel	1882	1884		Elevated to Borough
Mount Maunganui	1927	1945		Dependent on Tauranga County until 1937. Elevated to Borough 1945.
Nightcaps	1918	1967	1.15 km^{2}	
Normanby	fl. 1952		1.05 km^{2}	
Ohaupo	fl. 1952	fl. 1972	5.19 km^{2}	Dependent Town District within Waipa County
Ohura	fl. 1952	fl. 1972	3.30 km^{2}	Independent Town District within Taumarunui County
Onerahi	fl. 1952			
Opotiki	1882	1911		Elevated to borough
Ormondville	1885	1944		Merged into Dannevirke County
Otautau	fl. 1889	1978	3.86 km^{2}	Independent Town District within Wallace County
Otorohanga	fl. 1952		2.27 km^{2}	
Outram	1882	1961	3.59 km^{2}	Amalgamated with Taieri County
Papatoetoe	28 March 1919	1946		Elevated to borough
Patutahi	fl. 1952	fl. 1972		Dependent Town District within Cook County
Pleasant Point	fl. 1952		2.95 km^{2}	
Raglan	1906	1938		Raglan Town Board started in 1878 and merged with local highways boards into Raglan County Council in 1889. It was re-inaugurated as Raglan Town Board in 1906 and continued until 1938, when the Board again merged into the County Council.
Rawene	fl. 1952		1.84 km^{2}	
Russell	fl. 1952	fl. 1972	4.31 km^{2}	Dependent Town District within Bay of Islands County
Southbridge	fl. 1952		2.15 km^{2}	
Sumner	1883	1891		Elevated to borough
Tahunanui	1920			
Takaka	fl. 1952		2.37 km^{2}	
Taradale	1886	1953	5.94 km^{2}	Elevated to borough
Taupo	1946	fl. 1952	9.27 km^{2}	
Tawa Flat	1951	fl. 1952	2.91 km^{2}	
Te Karaka	fl. 1952		3.16 km^{2}	
Te Kauwhata	fl. 1952		5.22 km^{2}	
Te Puke	1913	1935	5.34 km^{2}	Elevated to borough
Tinwald	fl. 1952		6.17 km^{2}	
Tuakau	1914	fl. 1952	7.77 km^{2}	
Waiuku	1914	fl. 1952	5.18 km^{2}	
Warkworth	fl. 1952	fl. 1972		Independent Town District within Rodney County
Waverley	1877	fl. 1986	1.96 km^{2}	Independent Town District within Patea County
Woolston	13 September 1882	1893		Elevated to borough
Wyndham	1882	1977	2.75 km^{2}	Independent Town District within Southland County

=== 1989 reform of local government ===
By 1986, the number of territorial authorities and single-purpose authorities had grown to more than 850. In 1989 there was a major reform of local government in New Zealand. The numerous borough and county councils were amalgamated into larger districts, while the number of cities was reduced.

The lists above should include all local authorities that existed prior to 1989.

== Post-1989 local government reform ==
=== Regions ===
13 regional councils were established through the passing of the Local Government Act 1987. Nelson-Marlborough Regional Council was disestablished in 1992, when its functions went to the unitary authorities Nelson, Tasman, and Marlborough.

Auckland Regional Council was subsumed into the Auckland Council on 1 November 2010.

=== District councils ===
Most of the districts resulting from the 1989 reforms continue in operation. Banks Peninsula District is an exception; it was merged into Christchurch City Council in 2006.
