= Kerry Marshall =

New Zealand politician (1940–2020)

Kerry Marshall MBE JP
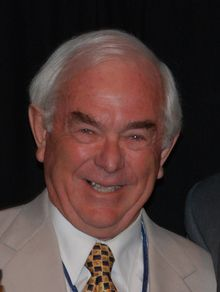
- Marshall in 2007

Last Mayor of Richmond
- In office 1986–1989
- Preceded by: Rob Maling

1st Mayor of Tasman
- In office 1989–1998
- Succeeded by: John Hurley

27th Mayor of Nelson
- In office 2007–2010
- Preceded by: Paul Matheson
- Succeeded by: Aldo Miccio

Personal details
- Born: Kerry Leigh Francis Marshall; 21 May 1940 Richmond, New Zealand
- Died: 3 March 2020 (aged 79) Nelson, New Zealand
- Spouse: Colleen Watson (m. 1964)
- Relations: Russell Marshall (brother)

Kerry Leigh Francis Marshall MBE JP (21 May 1940 – 3 March 2020) was a New Zealand politician who was active in local government in the northern part of New Zealand's South Island. He was mayor of three territorial authorities: Richmond Borough (1986–1989), Tasman District (1989–1998), and Nelson City (2007–2010).

== Early life ==
Born in Richmond in 1940, Marshall was the son of baker Cedric Marshall, who was active in the labour movement in Nelson. He was educated at Nelson College from 1954 to 1958.

== Career ==
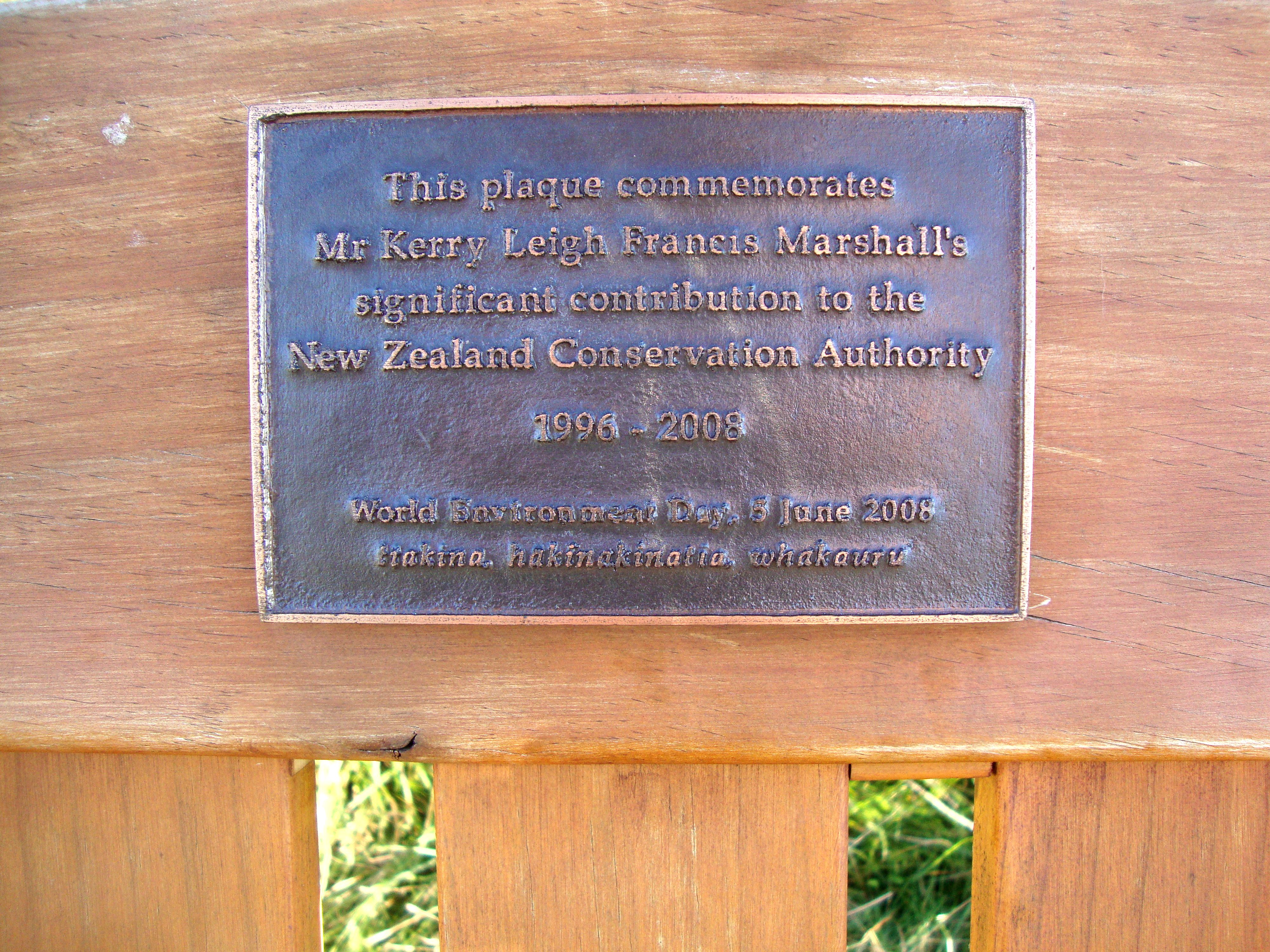
Plaque acknowledging the contribution of Marshall to the New Zealand Conservation Authority

Both Marshall and his wife were teachers by profession. He worked in Canada, Scotland and Banks Peninsula for some time before returning to Nelson in 1980. He became a Richmond borough councillor in 1982 and was elected mayor of Richmond in 1986. Following the 1989 local government reforms, he became the first mayor of the Tasman District (serving for nine years). He served as president of Local Government New Zealand, and was a local government commissioner from 2001 to 2005. In 2007, Marshall was elected mayor of Nelson, defeating eight other candidates including Gary Watson of Mainland Television.

Marshall was also the presiding member of the New Zealand Lotteries Commission and chair of the New Zealand Conservation Authority until 2008.

Marshall served as chair of the New Zealand Visitor Information Network, a member of the New Zealand Geographic Board, chair of the Greyhound As Pets Trust, a trustee of the Cawthron Institute of Science and Technology, chair of the New Zealand World of Wearable Art Development Trust, and chair of the Tasman Environmental Trust.

Marshall was the owner of the Kerry Marshall Company, undertaking consultancy in leadership, management, facilitation, administration, communication and public relations.

Marshall died in Nelson on 3 March 2020.

== Honours and awards ==
In the 1989 Queen's Birthday Honours, Marshall was appointed a Member of the Order of the British Empire, for services to local government. He was awarded the New Zealand 1990 Commemoration Medal in 1990, the Sir Jack Newman Award to Nelson's Outstanding Citizen of the Year awarded by the Rotary Club of Nelson in 1999, and the United States Information Service Study Award to the United States, also in 1999.

== Family ==
Marshall was the brother of New Zealand politician Russell Marshall. The Marshall brothers married the Nelson sisters Colleen and Barbara Watson. Colleen Marshall, the wife of Kerry Marshall, was head of music at Nelson College for Girls until her retirement. She was appointed a Member of the New Zealand Order of Merit for services to the arts in the 2014 Queen's Birthday Honours.

Political offices
Preceded by Rob Maling	Mayor of Richmond; 1986–1989	Office abolished
New office	Mayor of Tasman District; 1989–1998	Succeeded by John Hurley
Preceded by Paul Matheson	Mayor of Nelson; 2007–2010	Succeeded by Aldo Miccio
