= Lake Hāwea (town) =

Locality in Queenstown-Lakes District, Otago Region, New Zealand

- Town
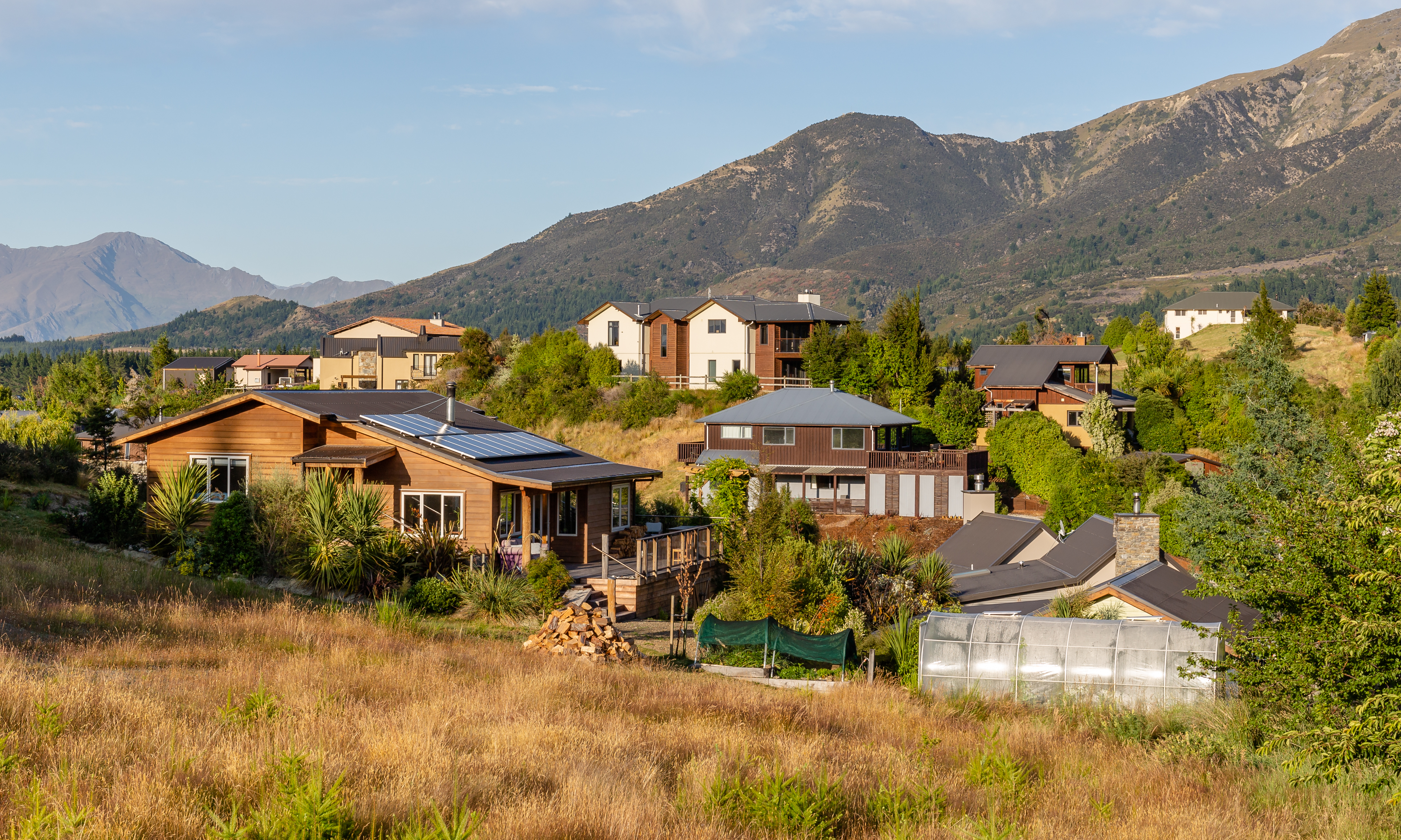
- Interactive map of Lake Hāwea
- Coordinates: 44°36′41″S 169°15′48″E
- Country: New Zealand
- Region: Otago
- Territorial authority: Queenstown-Lakes District
- Ward: Wānaka-Upper Clutha Ward
- Community: Wānaka-Upper Clutha Community
- Electorates: Waitaki; Te Tai Tonga (Māori)

Government
  - Territorial authority: Queenstown-Lakes District Council
  - Regional council: Otago Regional Council
  - Mayor of Queenstown-Lakes: John Glover
  - Waitaki MP: Miles Anderson
  - Te Tai Tonga MP: Tākuta Ferris

Area
  - Total: 3.66 km^{2} (1.41 sq mi)

Population (June 2025)
  - Total: 2,500
  - Density: 680/km^{2} (1,800/sq mi)
- Postcode: 9382

Lake Hāwea is a small settlement at the southern end of a lake, also named Lake Hāwea, in New Zealand's South Island. It is 18 kilometres to the northeast of Wānaka.

== Demographics ==
Lake Hawea covers 3.66 km^{2} (1.41 sq mi) and had an estimated population of 2,500 as of June 2025, with a population density of 683 people per km^{2}.

Historical population
| Year | Pop. | ±% p.a. |
|---|---|---|
| 2006 | 552 | — |
| 2013 | 798 | +5.41% |
| 2018 | 1,200 | +8.50% |

Before the 2023 census, Lake Hāwea had a smaller boundary, covering 2.39 km^{2} (0.92 sq mi). Using that boundary, Lake Hāwea had a population of 1,200 at the 2018 New Zealand census, an increase of 402 people (50.4%) since the 2013 census, and an increase of 648 people (117.4%) since the 2006 census. There were 444 households, comprising 630 males and 570 females, giving a sex ratio of 1.11 males per female. The median age was 39.4 years (compared with 37.4 years nationally), with 264 people (22.0%) aged under 15 years, 156 (13.0%) aged 15 to 29, 621 (51.8%) aged 30 to 64, and 159 (13.2%) aged 65 or older.

Ethnicities were 94.0% European/Pākehā, 8.5% Māori, 0.2% Pasifika, 2.5% Asian, and 3.2% other ethnicities. People may identify with more than one ethnicity.

The percentage of people born overseas was 25.0, compared with 27.1% nationally.

Although some people chose not to answer the census's question about religious affiliation, 66.2% had no religion, 25.0% were Christian, 0.2% had Māori religious beliefs and 2.5% had other religions.

Of those at least 15 years old, 258 (27.6%) people had a bachelor's or higher degree, and 96 (10.3%) people had no formal qualifications. The median income was $36,500, compared with $31,800 nationally. 132 people (14.1%) earned over $70,000 compared to 17.2% nationally. The employment status of those at least 15 was that 519 (55.4%) people were employed full-time, 162 (17.3%) were part-time, and 15 (1.6%) were unemployed.

== Climate ==
Climate data for Lake Hawea, elevation 350 m (1,150 ft), (1981–2010)
| Month | Jan | Feb | Mar | Apr | May | Jun | Jul | Aug | Sep | Oct | Nov | Dec | Year |
|---|---|---|---|---|---|---|---|---|---|---|---|---|---|
| Mean daily maximum °C (°F) | 21.3 (70.3) | 21.3 (70.3) | 19.0 (66.2) | 15.5 (59.9) | 11.6 (52.9) | 8.1 (46.6) | 7.5 (45.5) | 10.1 (50.2) | 12.9 (55.2) | 15.4 (59.7) | 17.7 (63.9) | 19.8 (67.6) | 15.0 (59.0) |
| Daily mean °C (°F) | 16.2 (61.2) | 15.9 (60.6) | 13.7 (56.7) | 10.7 (51.3) | 7.3 (45.1) | 4.2 (39.6) | 3.7 (38.7) | 5.5 (41.9) | 8.1 (46.6) | 10.3 (50.5) | 12.5 (54.5) | 14.5 (58.1) | 10.2 (50.4) |
| Mean daily minimum °C (°F) | 11.0 (51.8) | 10.5 (50.9) | 8.4 (47.1) | 5.9 (42.6) | 3.1 (37.6) | 0.4 (32.7) | −0.2 (31.6) | 0.7 (33.3) | 3.3 (37.9) | 5.2 (41.4) | 7.2 (45.0) | 9.2 (48.6) | 5.4 (41.7) |
| Average rainfall mm (inches) | 66.2 (2.61) | 45.3 (1.78) | 59.3 (2.33) | 54.0 (2.13) | 71.2 (2.80) | 84.0 (3.31) | 65.6 (2.58) | 97.2 (3.83) | 91.2 (3.59) | 73.7 (2.90) | 80.5 (3.17) | 88.7 (3.49) | 876.9 (34.52) |
Source: NIWA (rain 1991–2020)
