= The Hits Southern Lakes =

Queenstown, New Zealand; New Zealand
- Broadcast area: Queenstown Lakes and Central Otago
- Frequencies: Alexandra – 99.9 MHz; Queenstown – 90.4 MHz; Wānaka – 96.2 MHz

Programming
- Language: English language
- Format: Adult contemporary

Ownership
- Owner: NZME

History
- First air date: 2005; 21 years ago

Technical information
- Transmitter coordinates: 45.0332187°S 168.6600635°E

Links
- Website: Official website

The Hits Southern Lakes is an adult contemporary radio station in Queenstown, New Zealand.

Craig "Ferg" Ferguson hosts an entertaining local morning show on the station from 6.00am to 9.00am weekdays.
