= Peter Murray (rugby union) =

- Born: Peter Chapman Murray; 23 January 1884 Southern Grove, Whanganui, New Zealand
- Died: 6 February 1968 (aged 84) Auckland, New Zealand
- School: Wanganui Collegiate School

Rugby union career
- Position: Hooker
Provincial / State sides
Years	Team	Apps	(Points)
1901–09	Wanganui		
International career
Years	Team	Apps	(Points)
1908	New Zealand	1	(0)

Peter Chapman Murray (23 January 1884 – 6 February 1968) was a New Zealand rugby union player and politician. He played one Test for New Zealand in 1908, and was chairman of the Waimarino County Council from 1918 to 1926.

== Early life and family ==
Born at Southern Grove near Whanganui on 23 January 1884, Murray was the son of Elizabeth Murray (née Chapman) and her husband James Blair Murray. He was educated at Wanganui Collegiate School, and then farmed with his father at Southern Grove. From 1907 to 1911 he was manager of Paparangi station northwest of Whanganui, and then farmed at Raetihi. He married Gladys Amy Reed on 11 December 1912, and the couple had three daughters.

== Rugby union ==
A hooker, Murray made his debut for Wanganui as an 18-year-old. He represented the province from 1901 to 1909, and made two appearances for the North Island, in 1904 and 1908. Murray played just one match for the New Zealand national side, the All Blacks, a Test against the touring British and Irish Lions in 1908.

== Political career and other activities ==
Murray was elected as a member of the Waimarino County Council in 1916, and served as its chairman from 1918 to 1926. He was involved with the local Agricultural and Pastoral Association and Collie Club, and was a director of the Farmers' Co-operative Association. Murray also served as president of the Waimarino Racing Club and the Waimarino Golf Club. His wife, Gladys Murray, was the ladies' captain of the Waimarino Golf Club for a time.

== Death ==
Murray died in Auckland on 6 February 1968, and his body was cremated at Purewa Cemetery.
