= Richmond Borough, New Zealand =

Former borough of New Zealand

Richmond Borough
- Borough of New Zealand
- 1891–1989
- Map of the borough in 1928
- Capital: Richmond
- Area
  - Coordinates: 41°20′S 173°11′E
- History
  - Established: 1891
  - Disestablished: 1989
- Today part of: Tasman District Council

Richmond Borough (also known as the Borough of Richmond) was a borough of New Zealand that existed from 1891 until the 1989 reforms to local government, when it became part of Tasman District. The borough was the administrative division for the town of Richmond, located in the top of the South Island. It was governed by the Richmond Borough Council.

The administrative predecessor was Waimea County, followed by a five-year period as a town district before being constituted a borough. The borough was led by the mayor of Richmond and during the borough's 98 years of existence, there were 19 mayors.

== History ==
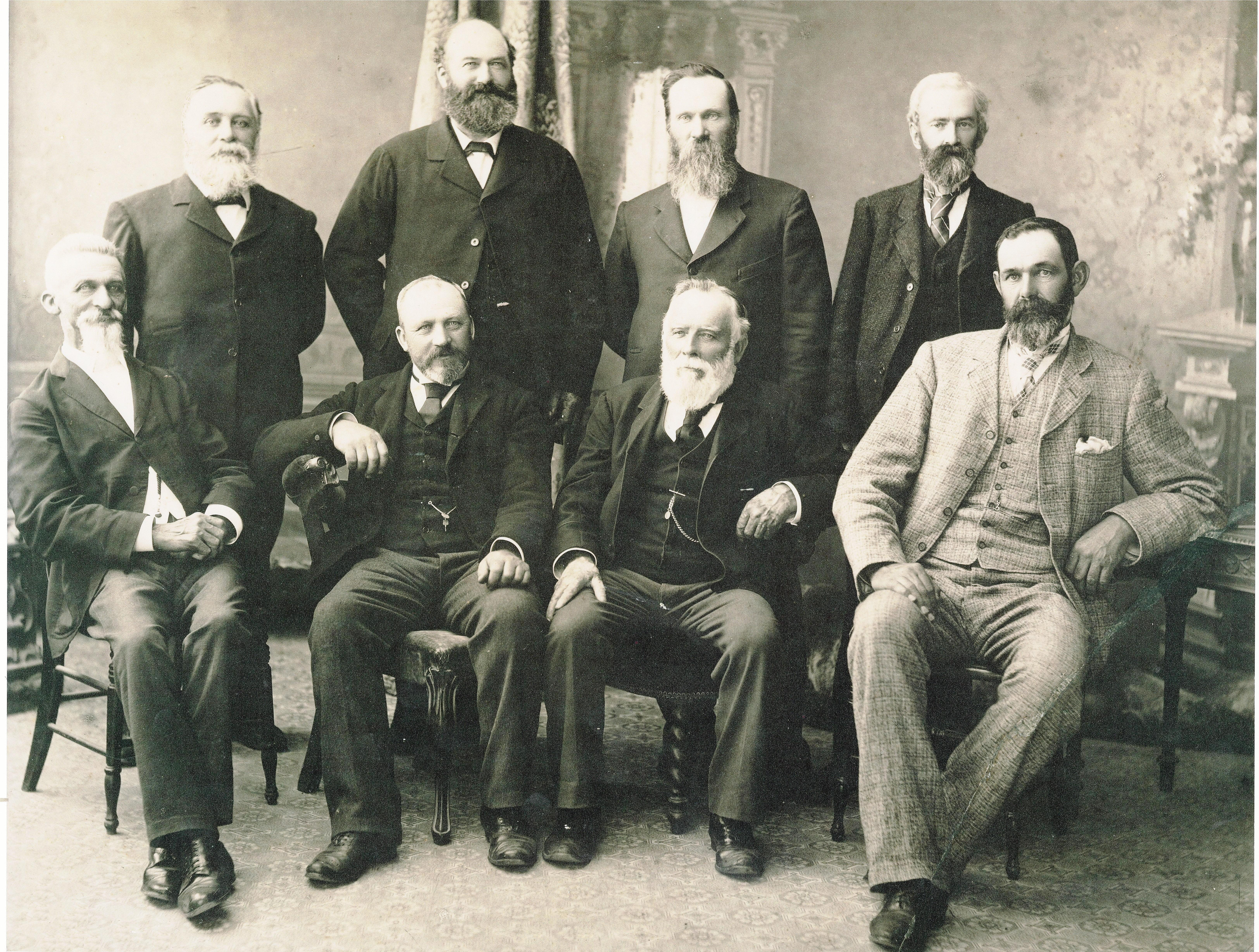
Richmond's first borough council in 1891. Standing from left: John Croucher, Joseph Best, Alfred Sheat (later a mayor), James Blair (town clerk). Seated from left: Samuel Fittall, Joshua Papps, George Talbot (mayor), William Harkness.

Following the provincial government period, when the wider area was administered by the Nelson Provincial Council, the town of Richmond was governed by Waimea County from 1877. Richmond became a town district on 13 February 1886. The incentive for this move was being able to afford a better water supply, for which ratepayers had to sanction a loan, and they thus had to belong to a separate local body.

The town board circulated a petition early in 1891 for Richmond to become a borough, extending the boundaries beyond the land that the town board was responsible for. Richmond was constituted a borough in June 1891.

By 1905, the borough had a population of 570 persons, including 138 ratepayers. The rateable value of the properties within its boundaries was NZ£96,547. Rates were set at three quarters of a penny, or 1/320 of a pound.

== Elections ==
George Talbot was the first mayoral elected on 8 July 1891. The borough existed for almost 100 years – until 1989. During that time, there were 19 mayors. Kerry Marshall was the last mayor of Richmond Borough (1986–1989) and the first mayor of the successor local authority, Tasman District (1989–1998).

Six councillors were to be elected initially but on nomination day (15 July 1891), only six candidates came forward and no election had to be held. Some time later, the number of councillors was increased to nine, but a council resolution in March 1903 reverted this to the initial six councillors.

== See also ==
- List of former local authorities in New Zealand
