= Rangiora County =

Former county of New Zealand

Coordinates: 43°18′11″S 172°36′03″E

- County of New Zealand
- 1912–1986
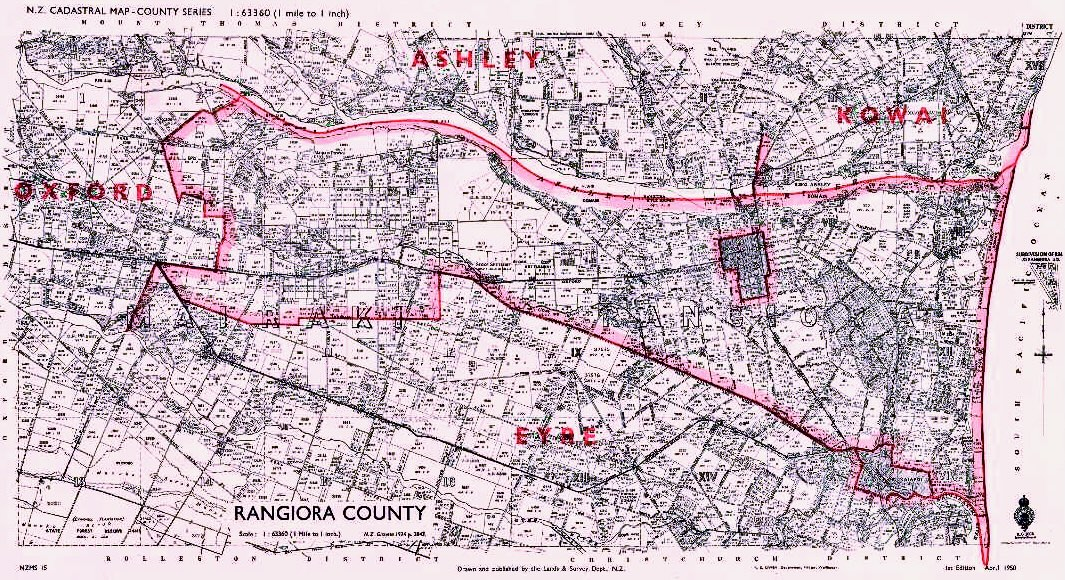
- 1950 Rangiora County map
- Capital: Rangiora
- History
  - Established: 1912
  - Disestablished: 1986
- Today part of: Waimakariri District

Rangiora County was one of the counties of New Zealand in the South Island.

Local government in the area began in 1864, when the Provincial Council gave Road Boards responsibility for roads, drainage and development and the power to levy rates. Ashley County extended from the Waimakariri River to the Hurunui River was subdivided into 8 ridings, first elected on 22 December 1876 for Oxford, Cust, Kowai, Mandeville (2), Waipara, Mount Thomas, West Eyreton and Eyreton. The county had few powers and left local administration to the Boards.

Rangiora and Mandeville Road Board was formed on 26 January 1864 at Woodend, with 5 elected members. The board moved to High Street, Rangiora in 1867. In 1912 Rangiora County was formed from Rangiora and Cust Road Districts and they held their first meeting on 26 April 1912 in the Road Board office. That was sold and new offices of brick and stone were built on an acre of land on the corner of East Belt and Woodend Road (now 139 Kippenberger Avenue), the first meeting there being on 10 October 1913. Rangiora Riding had 5 elected members and Cust Riding two. In 1986 Rangiora Borough and County formed Rangiora District.

On 1 April 1989 Rangiora District, Eyre County (except south of Waimakariri River), Oxford County, Kaiapoi Borough, Hurunui County's Mount Thomas riding west of the Okuku River, Waimakariri-Ashley Water Supply Board, Kaiapoi Municipal Electricity Department and Waimakariri Harbour Board merged to form Waimakariri District as part of the 1989 local government reforms.

== See also ==
- List of former territorial authorities in New Zealand § Counties
