= Mayor of Banks Peninsula =

Former head of the municipal government of Banks Peninsula District, New Zealand

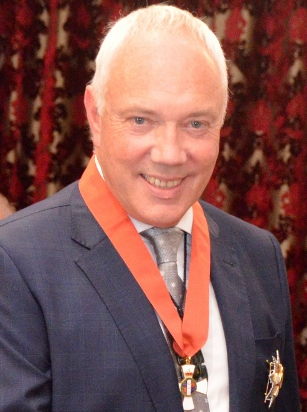
- Bob Parker, last Mayor of Banks Peninsula
- Style: His/Her Worship
- Member of: Banks Peninsula District Council
- Term length: 3 years, renewable
- Formation: 1989
- First holder: Terence Brocherie
- Final holder: Bob Parker
- Abolished: 2006
- Superseded by: Mayor of Christchurch

The Mayor of Banks Peninsula was the head of the municipal government of Banks Peninsula District, New Zealand. The mayor presided over the Banks Peninsula District Council and was directly elected using the first-past-the-post electoral system. The position existed from 1989 until 2006, when Banks Peninsula District was amalgamated into Christchurch City Council. There were three mayors.

== History ==
Banks Peninsula was established as part of the 1989 local government reforms from the amalgamation of the Lyttelton Borough Council and Mount Herbert, Wairewa and Akaroa County Councils. It amalgamated with the Christchurch City Council in March 2006.

== List of mayors of Banks Peninsula ==
Banks Peninsula District had three mayors:

	Name	Term
1	Terence Brocherie	1989–1992
2	Noeline Allan	1992–2001
3	Bob Parker	2001–2006
