= Queenstown-Lakes District Council =

Territorial authority in New Zealand

Coordinates: 45.0327823°S 168.6552961°E

- Seal

- Brand logo

Type
- Type: Territorial authority of Queenstown-Lakes District
- Term limits: None

History
- Established: Initial constitution; 16 October 1986; 39 years ago; Reconstitution; 1 November 1989; 36 years ago
- Preceded by: Queenstown Borough Council; Lake County Council; Arrowtown Borough Council
- New session started: 17 October 2025

Leadership
- Mayor: John Glover, Ind. since 17 October 2025
- Mayor: Quentin Smith, Ind. since 20 October 2022
- CEO: Michelle Morss (interim) since 23 January 2026

Structure
- Seats: 12 (including mayor)
- Political groups: Independent (12)
- Length of term: 3 years

Elections
- Voting system: First-past-the-post
- First election: 14 October 1989
- Last election: 11 October 2025
- Next election: 14 October 2028

Motto
- Montium ex Umero Longius Videmus

Meeting place
- 10 Gorge Road, Queenstown

Website
- qldc.govt.nz

Queenstown-Lakes District Council (abbr. QLDC) is the territorial authority for the Queenstown-Lakes District of New Zealand. It serves as the district's local government alongside the Otago Regional Council as the regional council. It was initially constituted in October 1986; in November 1989 it was reconstituted anew alongside all local authorities in New Zealand as part of major reforms to local government. Prior to the district council, local government in the area was split between three authorities.

The governing body of the council has 11 councillors and is chaired by the mayor of Queenstown-Lakes (currently John Glover since October 2025).

== History ==
The council was formed in 1989, replacing a council of the same name established in 1986. This council was established through the merger of Queenstown Borough District (established in 1866), Lake County Council (established in 1876), and Arrowtown Borough Council (established on 10 May 1877)

In 2020, the council had 442 staff, including 103 earning more than $100,000. According to the Taxpayers' Union lobby group, residential rates averaged $2,744.

== Governing body ==
=== Mayor ===
One mayor is elected at-large; they chair meetings of the governing body and act as the head of local government in the district.

=== Current composition ===
The current members of the governing body of council are:

Role	Name	Affiliation	Ward
Mayor	John Glover	Independent	Elected at-large
Deputy	Quentin Smith	Independent	Wānaka-Upper Clutha
Councillor	Barry Bruce	Independent	Wānaka-Upper Clutha
Councillor	Lyal Cocks	Independent	Wānaka-Upper Clutha
Councillor	Cody Tucker	Independent	Wānaka-Upper Clutha
Councillor	Niki Gladding	Independent	Queenstown-Whakatipu
Councillor	Esther Whitehead	Independent	Queenstown-Whakatipu
Councillor	Matt Wong	Independent	Queenstown-Whakatipu
Councillor	Gavin Bartlett	Independent	Queenstown-Whakatipu
Councillor	Craig Ferguson	Independent	Arrowtown-Kawarau
Councillor	Lisa Guy	Independent	Arrowtown-Kawarau
Councillor	Melissa White	Independent	Arrowtown-Kawarau

== Community boards ==
- Wānaka-Upper Clutha Community Board: Simon Telfer (Chair), Chris Hadfield, John Wellington, Linda Joll, Councillor Bruce, Councillor Cocks, Councillor Tucker

== Civic symbols ==
=== Seal and coat of arms ===
The council has a seal which features a coat of arms.
