= Coromandel County =

Former county of New Zealand

Coordinates: 36°45′25″S 175°29′54″E

- County of New Zealand
- 1877–1975
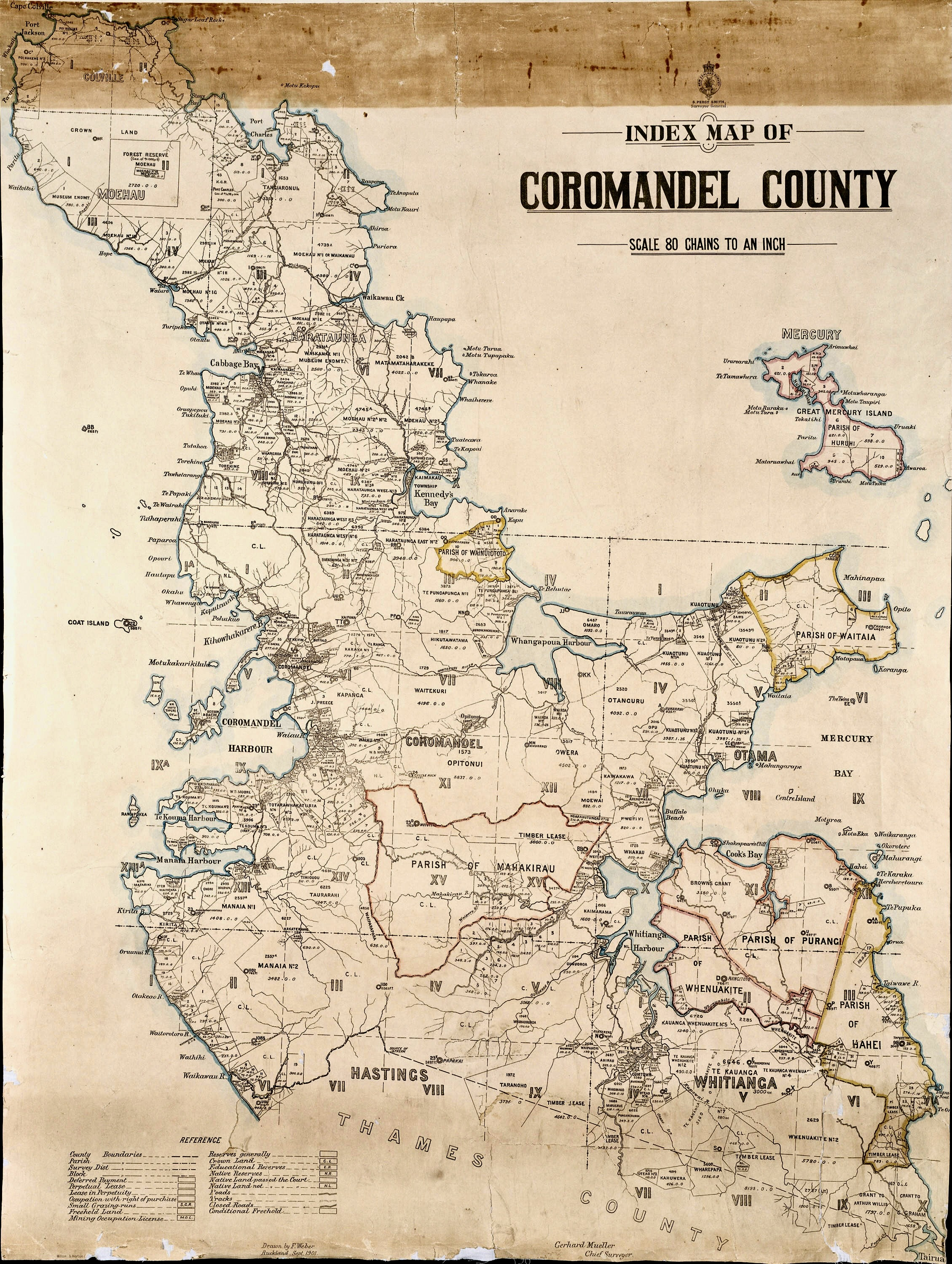
- 1900 map
- Capital: Coromandel
- History
  - Established: 1877
  - Disestablished: 1975
- Today part of: Thames-Coromandel District Council

Coromandel County was one of the counties of New Zealand on the North Island.

Coromandel County was formed on 9 January 1877 with 2 ridings, Harataunga with 4 councillors and Mercury Bay with 3.

Thames Borough, Thames County and Coromandel County joined to form Thames-Coromandel District from 1 October 1975.

== See also ==
- List of former territorial authorities in New Zealand § Counties
