= Queenstown-Lakes District =

- Territorial authority district
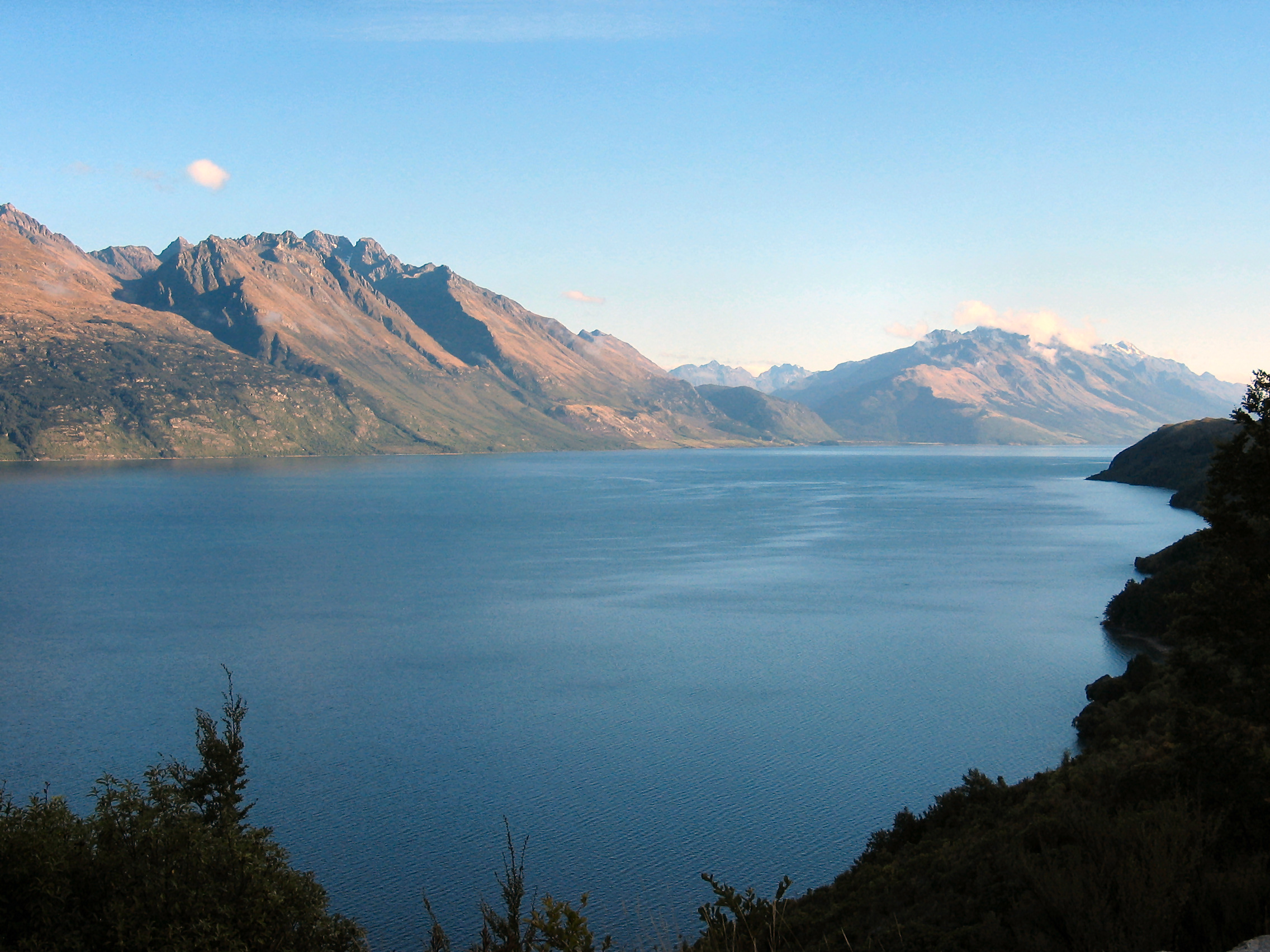
- Lake Wakatipu, one of the lakes in the district

- Queenstown-Lakes district in the South Island
- Coordinates: 45°01′52″S 168°39′51″E
- Country: New Zealand
- Region: Otago
- Wards: Arrowtown; Queenstown-Wakatipu; Wānaka
- Seat: Queenstown

Government
  - Body: Queenstown-Lakes District Council
  - Mayor: John Glover
  - Deputy Mayor: Quentin Smith

Area
  - Total: 8,719.66 km^{2} (3,366.68 sq mi)

Population (June 2025)
  - Total: 53,800
  - Density: 6.17/km^{2} (16.0/sq mi)
- Time zone: UTC+12 (NZST)
  - Summer (DST): UTC+13 (NZDT)
- Postcode(s): Map of postcodes
- Postcode(s): 9300, 9302, 9304, 9305, 9371, 9372, 9382, 9383, 9384, 9672, 9793
- Area code: 03
- Website: www.qldc.govt.nz

Queenstown-Lakes District, a local government district, is in the Otago Region of New Zealand that was formed in 1986. It is surrounded by the districts of Central Otago, Southland, Westland and Waitaki.

Much of the area is often referred to as Queenstown because of the popularity of the resort town, but the district covers a much wider area, including the towns of Wānaka to the north-east, Glenorchy to the north-west and Kingston to the south.

The district is sometimes called the Southern Lakes, as it contains Lake Wakatipu, Lake Wānaka and Lake Hāwea.

== Local government ==
The Queenstown Borough Council was constituted in 1866. In 1986, Queenstown Borough Council merged with Lake County to form Queenstown-Lakes District Council. In 1989, Arrowtown Borough Council amalgamated with Queenstown-Lakes District Council in the 1989 local government reforms.

The district is administered by the Queenstown Lakes District Council (QLDC) and regionally by the Otago Regional Council.

The Queenstown Lakes District is expected to grow faster than Auckland over the period 2006–31. Statistics New Zealand projections show the district shares the highest growth rate in New Zealand of 2.2% a year with the Selwyn District.

== Demographics ==
Queenstown-Lakes District covers 8,719.66 km^{2} (3,366.68 sq mi) and had an estimated population of 53,800 as of June 2025, with a population density of 6.2 people per km^{2}.

Historical population
| Year | Pop. | ±% p.a. |
|---|---|---|
| 2006 | 22,959 | — |
| 2013 | 28,224 | +2.99% |
| 2018 | 39,153 | +6.77% |
| 2023 | 47,808 | +4.08% |

Queenstown-Lakes District had a population of 47,808 in the 2023 New Zealand census, an increase of 8,655 people (22.1%) since the 2018 census, and an increase of 19,584 people (69.4%) since the 2013 census. There were 24,264 males, 23,388 females and 156 people of other genders in 17,835 dwellings. 3.4% of people identified as LGBTIQ+. The median age was 35.5 years (compared with 38.1 years nationally). There were 7,656 people (16.0%) aged under 15 years, 9,648 (20.2%) aged 15 to 29, 24,816 (51.9%) aged 30 to 64, and 5,691 (11.9%) aged 65 or older.

People could identify as more than one ethnicity. The results were 82.8% European (Pākehā); 6.4% Māori; 1.5% Pasifika; 10.5% Asian; 5.3% Middle Eastern, Latin American and African New Zealanders (MELAA); and 2.2% other, which includes people giving their ethnicity as "New Zealander". English was spoken by 96.8%, Māori language by 1.1%, Samoan by 0.1% and other languages by 17.7%. No language could be spoken by 1.9% (e.g. too young to talk). New Zealand Sign Language was known by 0.2%. The percentage of people born overseas was 40.2, compared with 28.8% nationally.

Religious affiliations were 24.1% Christian, 1.7% Hindu, 0.5% Islam, 0.1% Māori religious beliefs, 1.0% Buddhist, 0.4% New Age, 0.2% Jewish, and 1.6% other religions. People who answered that they had no religion were 65.6%, and 4.9% of people did not answer the census question.

Of those at least 15 years old, 9,759 (24.3%) people had a bachelor's or higher degree, 18,087 (45.0%) had a post-high school certificate or diploma, and 8,853 (22.0%) people exclusively held high school qualifications. The median income was $52,600, compared with $41,500 nationally. 5,805 people (14.5%) earned over $100,000 compared to 12.1% nationally. The employment status of those at least 15 was that 25,716 (64.0%) people were employed full-time, 5,637 (14.0%) were part-time, and 492 (1.2%) were unemployed.

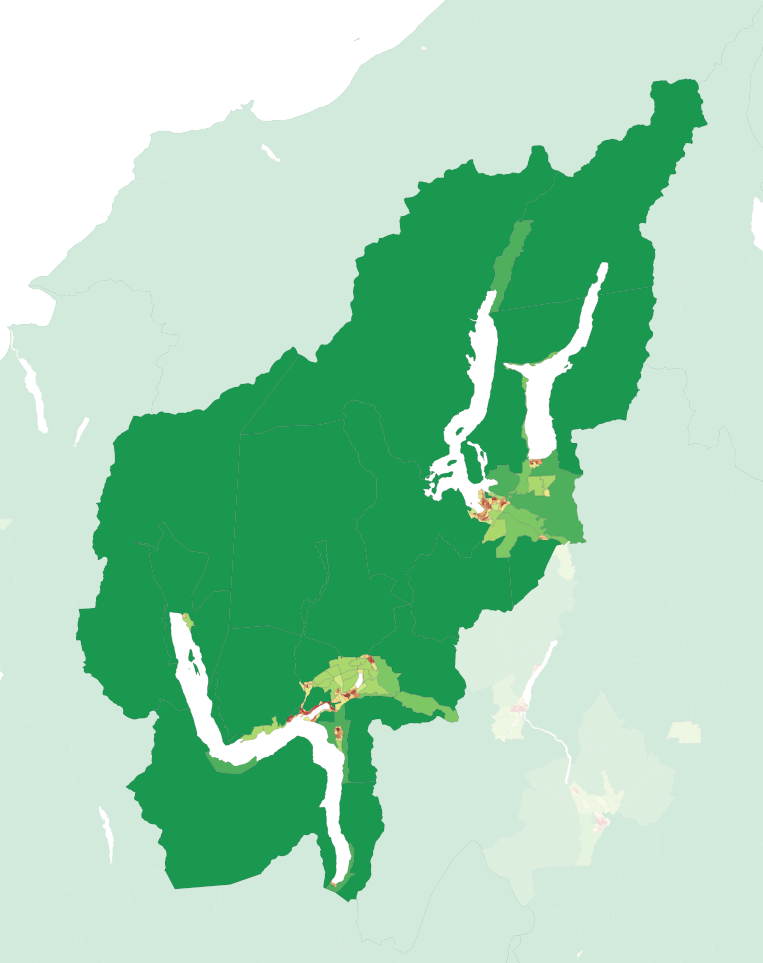
Population density in the 2023 census

Individual wards
| Name | Area (km^{2}) | Population | Density (per km^{2}) | Dwellings | Median age | Median income |
|---|---|---|---|---|---|---|
| Queenstown-Whakatipu | 2,953.86 | 18,261 | 6.2 | 6,573 | 33.4 years | $51,900 |
| Wānaka-Upper Clutha | 4,225.97 | 16,662 | 3.9 | 6,732 | 39.0 years | $49,900 |
| Arrowtown-Kawarau | 1,539.84 | 12,885 | 8.4 | 4,524 | 36.4 years | $57,100 |
| New Zealand | | | | | 38.1 years | $41,500 |

=== Urban areas and settlements ===
The Queenstown-Lakes District has four towns with a population over 1,000. Together they are home to 88.4% of the district's population.

In February 2023, Stuff reported that 27% of houses in the Queenstown Lakes District, particularly Queenstown and Wanaka, were unoccupied dwellings that were used by their owners as holiday homes and people who chose not to rent them. Though 650 new homes were built in the district, there was a shortage of rental housing since homeowners preferred to use their homes as short-term accommodation for platforms such as Airbnb. Between December 2021 and December 2022, the online auction platform Trade Me reported a 49% decline in rental listings in the Lakes District. Similarly, the Ministry of Business, Innovation and Employment (MBIE) reported that the number of rental houses between November 2021 and November 2022 had dropped by 100. By November 2022, Radio New Zealand reported that the average home in the Lakes District cost NZ$1.7 million, while a three-bedroom rental cost a minimum of NZ$800 per week and a single bedroom rental NZ$500 or more per week.

| Urban area | Population (June 2025) | % of region |
|---|---|---|
| Queenstown | 29,000 | 53.9% |
| Wānaka | 13,200 | 24.5% |
| Arrowtown | 2,860 | 5.3% |
| Lake Hāwea | 2,500 | 4.6% |

== Economy ==
In the year to 31 March 2023, the gross domestic product (GDP) of the Queenstown Lakes District was $3,960m, representing 1% of New Zealand's total GDP. Based on ANZSIC categories, the industry sector with the largest contribution to the Queenstown Lakes District GDP was accommodation and food services, at 14.1%. This is markedly greater than the 2.1% contribution that accommodation and food services make to the national economy. The next highest contribution to the district GDP was from construction, representing 10.6% in the district GDP, versus 6.3% in the national economy. Rental, hiring and real estate services contributed 10.5%, compared with 6.2% in the national economy.

As a major visitor destination, Queenstown Lakes District has a much higher proportion of people in employed in accommodation (8.7%) than the national average (1.1%). The four largest industries in the district based on employment were accommodation, cafes and restaurants, house construction, and the operation of sports and physical recreation venues. Tourism as a whole contributed $889 million (24.2%) to the district GDP, compared with 2.7% nationally.

== See also ==
- Southern Lakes (New Zealand)
