= New Zealand Conservation Authority =

Independent advisory body

The New Zealand Conservation Authority / Te Pou Atawhai Taiao O Aotearoa is an independent statutory body that advises the Minister of Conservation and Director-General of Conservation on conservation issues of national importance.

== Role ==
Its stated mission is:

"To ensure for the people of New Zealand, that the richness of New Zealand's natural and cultural heritage is valued, restored, maintained, and cared for by all, in order to enhance our environment and quality of life."

== Authority members ==
The Authority has 13 members appointed with consultation from different members of the Government. Two are appointed after consultation with the Minister of Māori Affairs, two after consultation with the Minister of Tourism and one after consultation with the Minister of Local Government.

=== Chair ===
- Dame Kerry Prendergast (Acting) (2018-2019)
- Edward Ellison (2019-current), a sheep farmer and former deputy kaiwhakahaere (administrator) of Te Runanga o Ngāi Tahu (TRoNT).
