= Waimarino County =

Former county of New Zealand

Coordinates: 39.4°S 175.3°E

Waimarino County is a former county of New Zealand. It was defined in 1910 by the Kaitieke County Act 1910 as follows:

ALL that area in the Wellington Land District bounded towards the north generally by Kaitieke County as described in the First Schedule hereto, and by East Taupō County; towards the east by Rangitikei County; towards the south generally by Wanganui County; and towards the west generally by Waitotara County and Whangamomona County: excluding the Ohakune Town District.

Waimarino County was amalgamated with Raetihi Borough and Ohakune Borough to form Waimarino District in 1988.

== See also ==
- List of former territorial authorities in New Zealand § Counties
