= Southern Lakes =

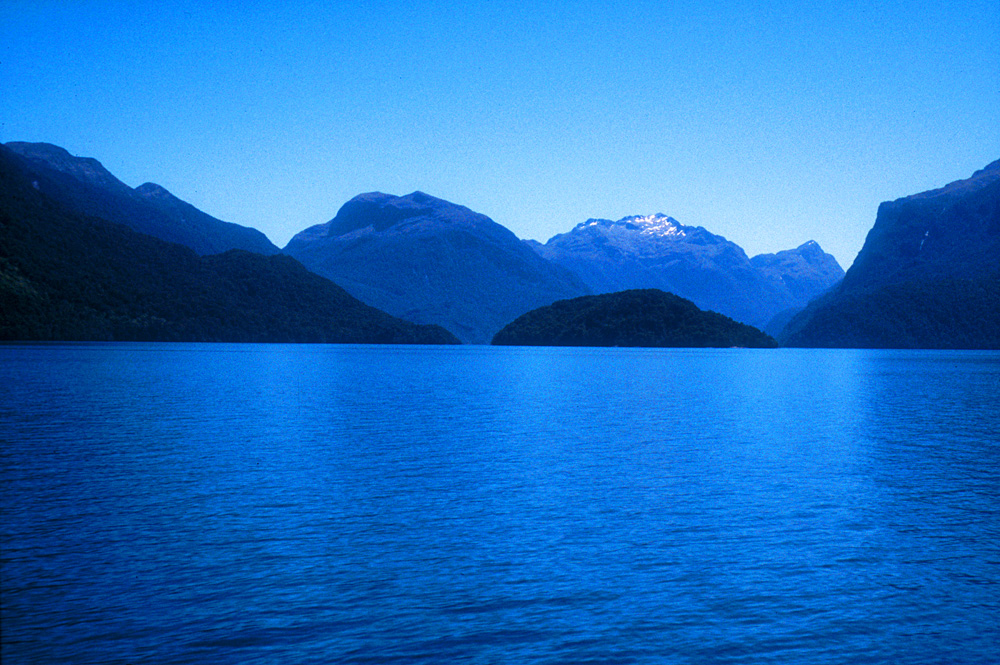
- Lake Te Anau

- Approximate location of the Southern Lakes Southern Lakes (New Zealand)
- Interactive map of Southern Lakes
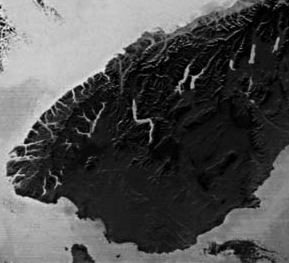
- NASA satellite image of the Southern Lakes, looking north-northwest. The prominent central zigzag is Lake Wakatipu; to the north are the twin lakes of Wānaka and Hāwea, beyond which lie the Mackenzie Basin's Ōhau, Pukaki, and Tekapo. To the left of Wakatipu is the branched form of Lake Te Anau; south of this is the smaller Manapouri and – close to the south coast – Hauroko and Poteriteri
- Location: Southland and Central Otago
- Coordinates: 45°3′S 168°30′E
- Type: Glacial lakes
- Basin countries: New Zealand
- Surface area: 28,000 to 35,000 km^{2} (11,000 to 14,000 sq mi)
- Max. depth: 70–444 m (230–1,457 ft)
- Surface elevation: 278–710 m (912–2,329 ft)

The Southern Lakes is an unofficial name given to an area of the southern South Island of New Zealand. Despite being an unofficial designation, the term Southern Lakes is sometimes used by organisations such as the New Zealand Meteorological Service and Automobile Association. Though exact definitions vary, the area encompasses parts of western Southland (including Fiordland) and Central Otago, and is occasionally extended to include the Mackenzie Basin of inland Canterbury, a total of roughly 28,000 to 35,000 square kilometres (11,000 to 14,000 sq mi).

The region is generally lightly populated, with much of its southwestern part being uninhabited national park. Much of the scenery was heavily glaciated during the last ice age, and as such contains many broad U-shaped valleys, several of which are filled with large lakes. These include the country's deepest lake, Lake Hauroko, and three of the country's four largest lakes. If the Mackenzie Basin is included, seven of the country's ten largest lakes form part of the Southern Lakes.

Many of the region's lakes feed the country's second-longest river, the Clutha River, and its tributaries — these include Lakes Wakatipu, Wānaka, and Hāwea, as well as the artificial lakes Dunstan (formed on the river by a hydroelectric dam at Clyde) and Roxburgh (formed behind a similar but smaller dam at Roxburgh). Other lakes, such as Te Anau and Manapouri, feed the system of the Waiau River. The northern group of Mackenzie Basin lakes form part of the Waitaki River system.

The areas main centres of population are Queenstown and Wānaka in Otago, and Te Anau in Southland.

== List of lakes ==
Lakes with a surface area of more than 20 square kilometres (7.7 sq mi). Those listed as being in Canterbury are often excluded from definitions of the Southern Lakes.

| Rank | Name | Surface area | Region | Notes |
|---|---|---|---|---|
| 1 | Lake Te Anau | 344 km^{2} (133 sq mi) | Southland | Largest lake in the South Island, Second largest in New Zealand |
| 2 | Lake Wakatipu | 291 km^{2} (112 sq mi) | Otago | |
| 3 | Lake Wānaka | 192 km^{2} (74 sq mi) | Otago | |
| 4 | Lake Pukaki | 179 km^{2} (69 sq mi) | Canterbury | |
| 5 | Lake Manapouri | 142 km^{2} (55 sq mi) | Southland | |
| 6 | Lake Hāwea | 141 km^{2} (54 sq mi) | Otago | |
| 7 | Lake Tekapo | 83 km^{2} (32 sq mi) | Canterbury | |
| 8 | Lake Hauroko | 63 km^{2} (24 sq mi) | Southland | New Zealand's deepest lake |
| 9 | Lake Ōhau | 63 km^{2} (24 sq mi) | Canterbury | |
| 10 | Lake Poteriteri | 43 km^{2} (17 sq mi) | Southland | |
| 11 | Lake Monowai | 31 km^{2} (12 sq mi) | Southland | |
| 12 | Lake McKerrow | 28 km^{2} (11 sq mi) | Southland | |
| 13 | Lake Dunstan | 26 km^{2} (10 sq mi) | Otago | Artificial |

Other notable lakes include the Mavora Lakes of Southland, Lake Hayes in Otago, and the artificial Lake Ruataniwha, part of the Canterbury-Otago boundary.

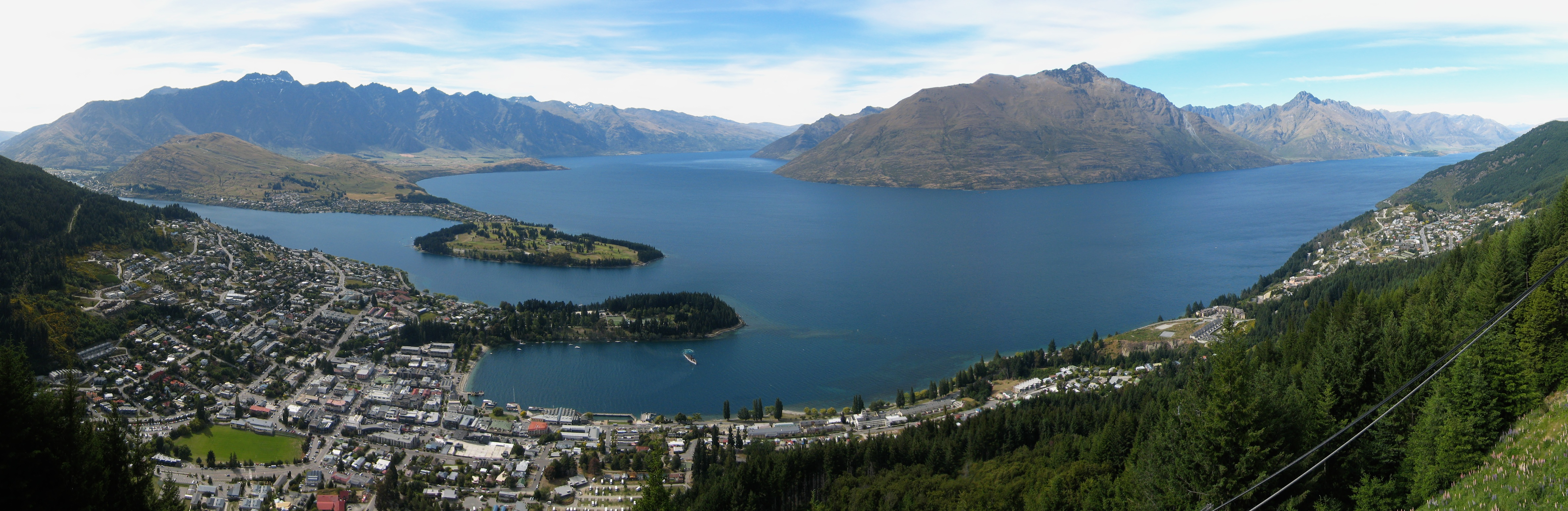
Panorama of Queenstown and Lake Wakatipu
