= Mayor of Richmond, New Zealand =

Head of the Richmond Borough Council, New Zealand

Mayor of Richmond
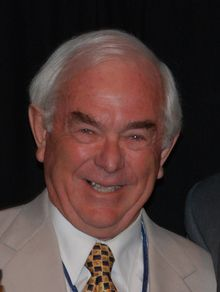
- Kerry Marshall, the last holder of the post
- Style: His Worship
- Term length: varied
- Inaugural holder: George Talbot
- Formation: 1891
- Final holder: Kerry Marshall
- Abolished: 1989
- Succession: Mayor of Tasman

The mayor of Richmond was the head of the municipal government of Richmond, New Zealand. The position existed from 1891, when the Borough of Richmond was formed, until the borough was amalgamated into Tasman District in the 1989 local government reforms.

== History ==
Richmond was constituted a borough in June 1891.

The nomination meeting for the first mayoral election was set for 8 July 1891, but George Talbot was the only candidate and he was thus declared elected without opposition. Talbot retained the mayoralty continuously until April 1903, when he announced his retirement. John Croucher and William Harkness contested the election on 29 April 1903, with Croucher winning by 89 votes to 44. Croucher was unopposed in April 1904, in April 1905, and in April 1906. Croucher retired at the April 1907 election, and Alfred Sheat was declared elected unopposed.

William Coleman, the fifth mayor, was elected in April 1913, but by June he had fallen ill. George Edward Chisnall deputised for Coleman for the rest of the term until the next election in April 1914. Chisnall stood in the 29 April 1914 election and narrowly beat James Hunt, a previous mayor. In April 1915, Hunt was returned unopposed. Thomas Bell became mayor in April 1917 being the only candidate. He was installed as mayor on 2 May, and died from a brain aneurysm on 13 May 1917, having served for just 11 days. Bell was succeeded by William Wilkes, who retired after tree two-year terms in 1923. Wilkes was succeeded by James Haycock, who was declared elected unopposed in April 1923. Haycock died in October 1923. James Hunt won the resulting by-election and served the remainder of the two-year term until April 1925, when he retired. George Kidd won the April 1925 election. Shortly before the end of his two-year term, Kidd resigned in February 1927 over health concerns, and councillor Warren Kelly was elected by his fellow councillors for the remaining two months.

At the April 1927 local election, Richmond Borough was faced with the unusual problem of not having received any nominations for the mayoralty. Similarly, for the six positions available as councillors, only three nominations were received. When another call was made for nominations two weeks later, former mayor Hunt was the only candidate and thus declared elected. Kelly and Hunt contested the 1 May 1929 mayoral election, with Kelly getting elected.

Albert Tuffnell, who had been deputy mayor from 1935 to 1938, was elected mayor in 1938.

Maurice (Morrie) McGlashen was mayor from 1947 to 1959. His son, Muir McGlashen, was mayor from 1962 to 1974.

Kerry Marshall, the last mayor of Richmond, became the first mayor of Tasman.

== List of office holders ==
Richmond Borough Council had the following mayors:

| | Name | Term |
|---|---|---|
| 1 | George Talbot | 1891–1903 |
| 2 | John Croucher | 1903–1907 |
| 3 | Alfred Sheat | 1907–1910 |
| 4 | James Hunt | 1910–1913 |
| 5 | William Coleman | 1913–1914 |
| 6 | George Edward Chisnall | 1914–1915 |
| (4) | James Hunt | 1915–1917 |
| 7 | Thomas Bell | 1917 |
| 8 | William Wilkes | 1917–1923 |
| 9 | James A. Haycock | 1923 |
| (4) | James Hunt | 1923–1925 |
| 10 | George Kidd | 1925–1927 |
| 11 | Warren Kelly | 1927 |
| (4) | James Hunt | 1927–1929 |
| (11) | Warren Kelly | 1929–1938 |
| 12 | Albert Tuffnell | 1938–1947 |
| 13 | Maurice McGlashen | 1947–1959 |
| 14 | Harold Lowry | 1959–1961 |
| 15 | Alexander William Doran | 1961–1962 |
| 16 | Muir McGlashen | 1962–1974 |
| 17 | Herb King | 1974–1980 |
| 18 | Rob Maling | 1980–1986 |
| 19 | Kerry Marshall | 1986–1989 |
