= Jack Laird (potter) =

New Zealand ceramist (1920–2009)

Jack Laird OBE
- Born: Jack Denis Laird; 29 August 1920; Watford, Hertfordshire, England
- Died: 7 August 2009 (aged 88); New Zealand
- Education: Chelsea School of Art; University of London
- Known for: Pottery
- Spouse: Peggy Marjorie Biggerstaff (m. 1943)

Jack Denis Laird OBE (29 August 1920 – 7 August 2009) was a New Zealand potter.

== Early life ==
Laird was born in Watford, Hertfordshire, England, on 29 August 1920. He married Peggy Marjorie Biggerstaff in 1943. Following World War II, he studied illustration and graphic design at the Chelsea School of Art on an ex-serviceman's scholarship. He began to specialize in pottery while undertaking postgraduate study at the University of London. In 1953, Laird moved to Jersey, where he taught art at a grammar school. In 1959, he emigrated to New Zealand to teach extramurally, based in Palmerston North, at Victoria University of Wellington. He became a naturalised New Zealand citizen in 1975.

== Pottery in Nelson ==
In 1964, the Lairds established Waimea Pottery in Richmond, New Zealand, near Nelson. There, Laird trained a generation of Nelson potters, including Royce McGlashen, Darryl Robertson, John and Anne Crawford, and Laird's son Paul. At its peak, Waimea Pottery employed 17 potters. Later, Laird designed tableware for Temuka Pottery.

In the 1984 New Year Honours, Laird was appointed an Officer of the Order of the British Empire for services to pottery.

Laird died in 2009.
