= Lake County, New Zealand =

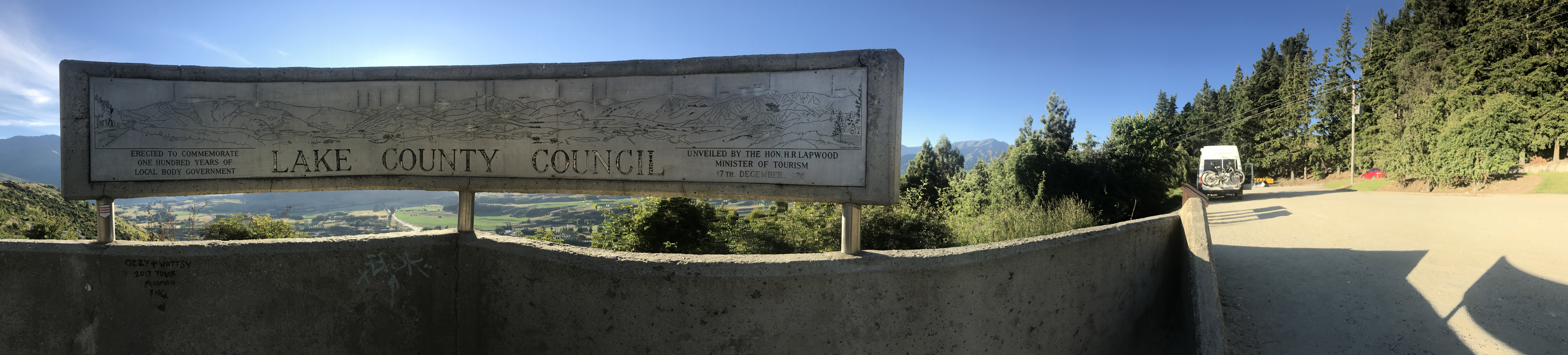
Lake County Council sign from 1976

Lake County was one of the counties of New Zealand in the South Island. In 1986, it merged with the Queenstown Borough Council to form the Queenstown Lakes District Council. Lake County was the second largest and most sparsely populated county.

== Geography ==
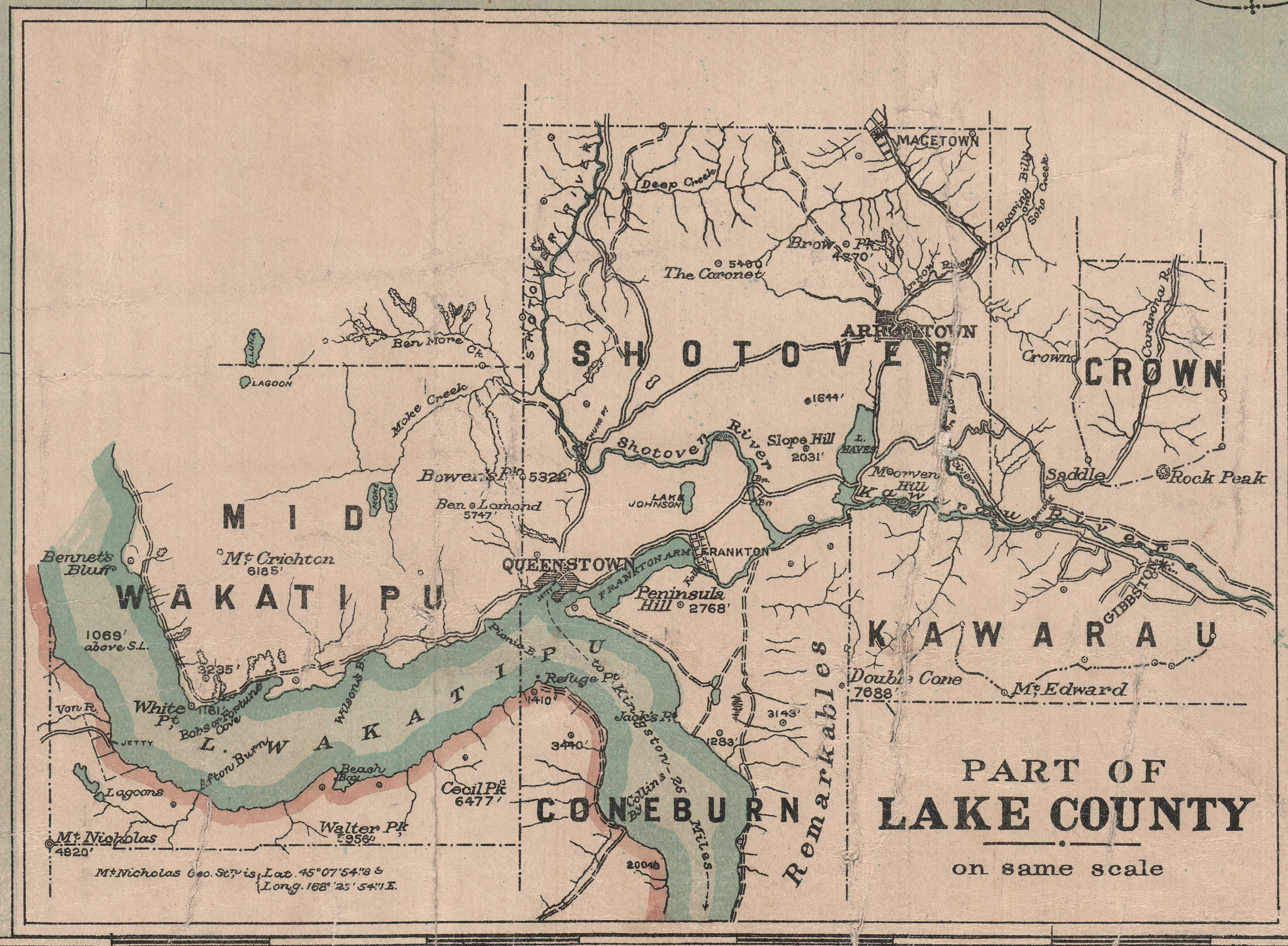
1915 map showing part of Lake County

Lake County stretched from Wanaka in the north to Parawa in the south following the Wilkin and Kawarau Rivers on the eastern border and bordering the coast along the Bligh Sound in the west. The area is heavily mountainous with the Slate and Hector Ranges, the Remarkables, and part of the Southern Alps falling in the county area.

In 1949 the county had 300 miles (480 km) of roads, with two thirds being mountainous.

== Demographics ==
In 1936 Lake County had a population of 2,626 but by the 1945 census this had halved to 1,389. The county had a rateable value of £184 per square mile compared to the average of £3,010

== Notable people ==
- Robert McDougall — Known as the father of Pembroke (Wanaka) McDougall served as postmaster; registrar of births, deaths, and marriages; and justice of the peace. McDougall became one of the first councillors upon formation of the county and retained his seat for 37 years. McDougall also served as chairman of the Wanaka Islands Domain Board and donated land for the first school in Wanaka.

== Lake County Council Chambers ==
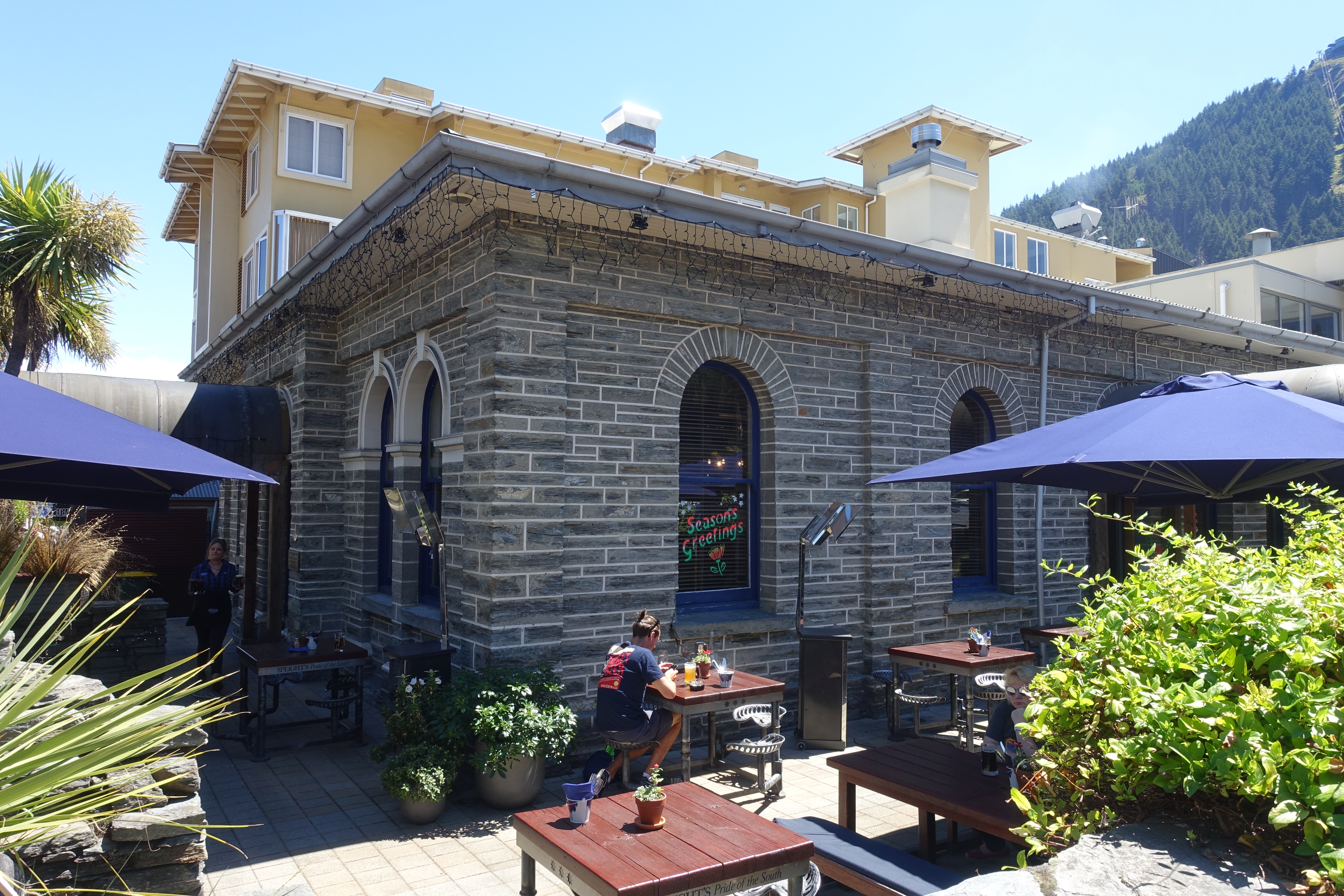
Council chambers in 2018

The Lake County Council Chambers was designed in 1880 by Frederick William Burwell in a vernacular style with Romanesque detailing. The building was controversial as it was considered excessive expenditure by rate-payers but construction went ahead and the schist building opened in 1881. In 1999 the Queenstown-Lakes District Council sold the building and it has since been used as an ale house. The former council chambers are registered as a category 2 building with Heritage New Zealand.

== See also ==
- List of former territorial authorities in New Zealand § Counties
