= Tamaki City =

Coordinates: 36.936°S 174.846°E

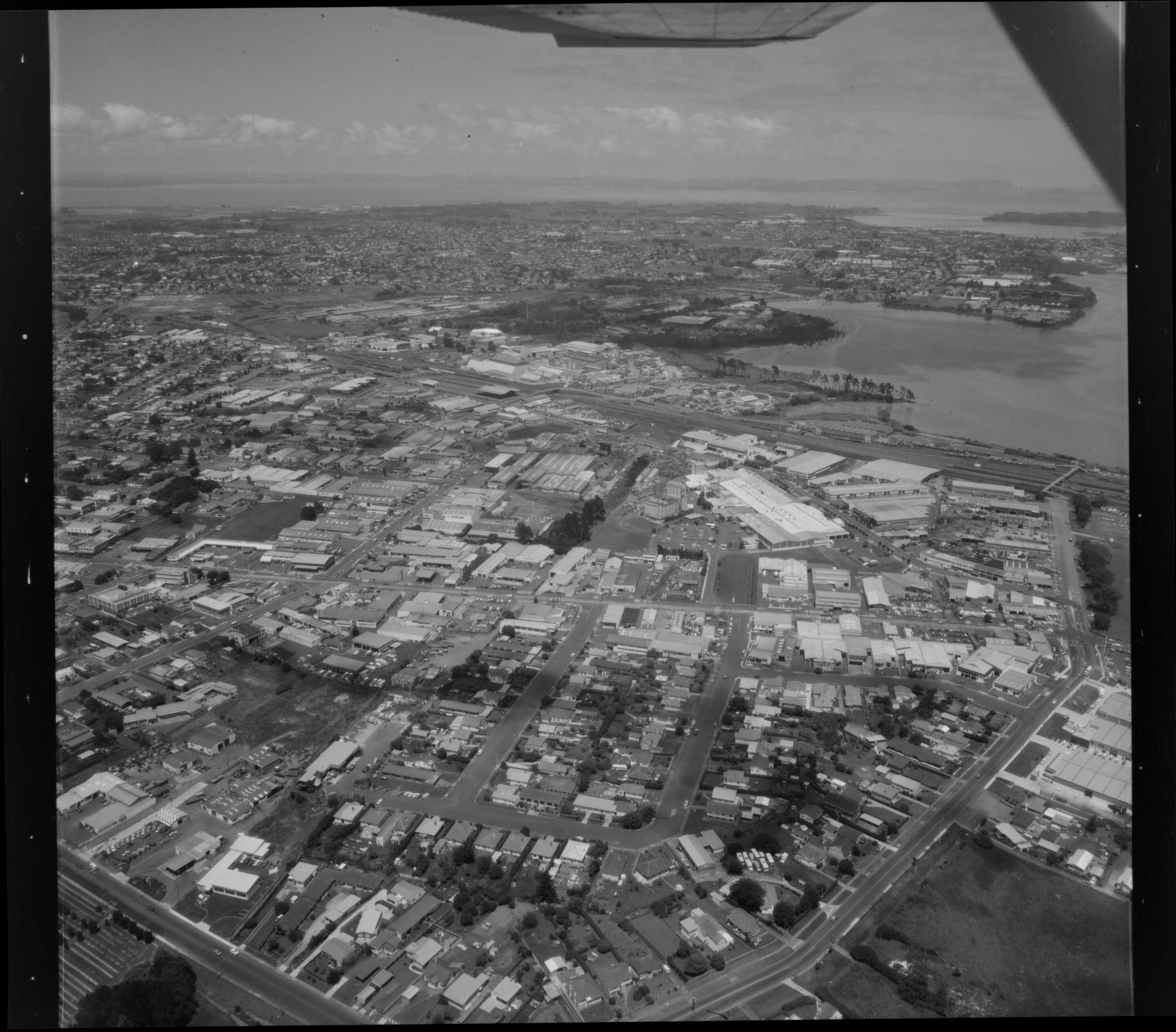
Aerial view of Tamaki City in January 1989

Tamaki City was a short-lived city within the Auckland metropolitan area in New Zealand.

Tamaki Borough was formed by the amalgamation of Mt Wellington and Ōtāhuhu boroughs on 19 October 1986. Tamaki was proclaimed a city on 28 January 1987 and was dissolved on 26 October 1989 pending amalgamation with Auckland City.
