= Banks Peninsula District =

Former New Zealand district

- Former territorial authority district
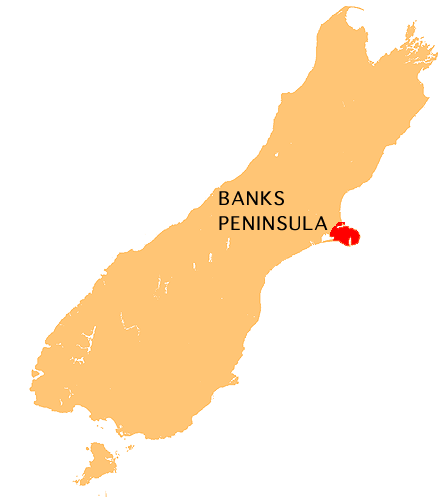
- Banks Peninsula district within the South Island
- Country: New Zealand
- Region: Canterbury

Government
  - Territorial authority: Banks Peninsula District Council (1989–2006); Christchurch City Council (2006–)
- Time zone: UTC+12 (NZST)
  - Summer (DST): UTC+13 (NZDT)

The Banks Peninsula District is a former territorial authority district in New Zealand.

Banks Peninsula District was formed through the 1989 local government reforms from the amalgamation of the Lyttelton Borough Council and Mount Herbert, Wairewa and Akaroa County Councils. It was governed by a mayor and district councillors. Following a vote held in November 2005, it amalgamated with the Christchurch City Council on 6 March 2006.

== See also ==
- Districts of New Zealand
