= Race to the Sky (hillclimb) =

Coordinates: 44.8775°S 169.091°E

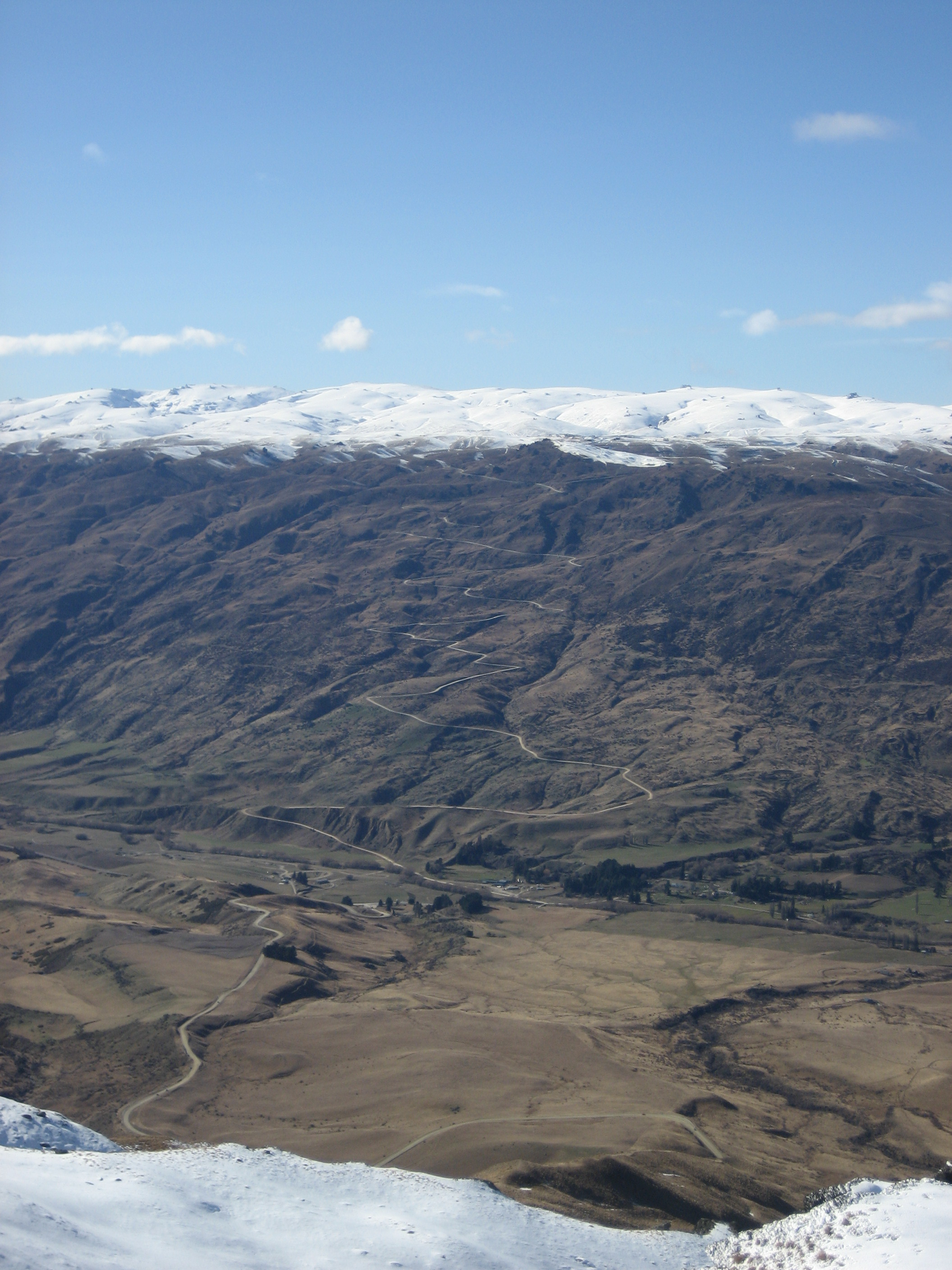
Circuit

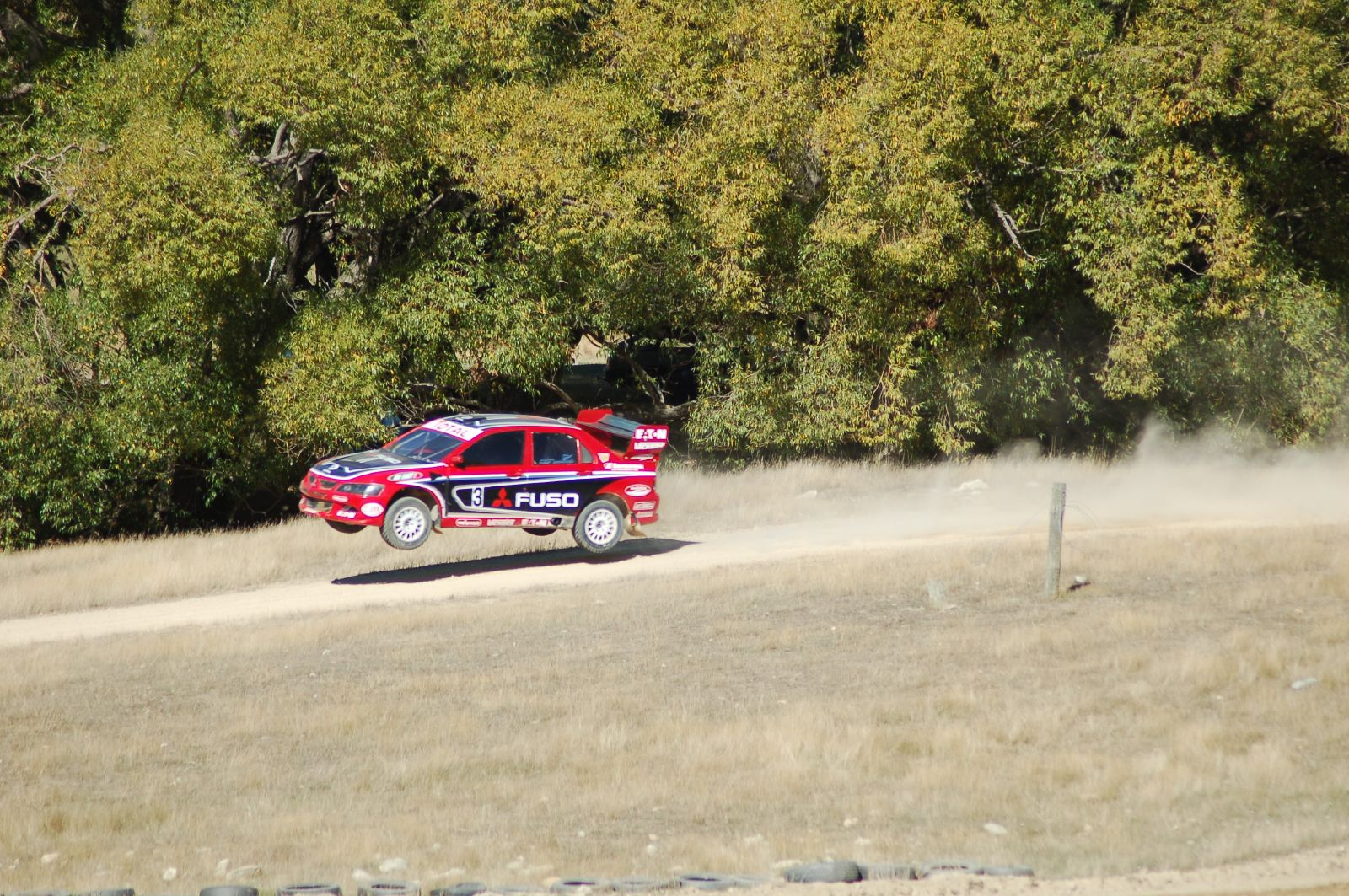
Andrew Hawkeswood in a jump during the Shootout for the 2007 Event.

The Race to the Sky is an annual automobile and motorcycle gravel hillclimb to the summit of a mountain in the Cardrona Valley of New Zealand. The race was held every year from 1998 to 2007 for two days over the Easter weekend as the Silverstone Race to the Sky, and returned in 2015 as the Repco Race to the Sky.

The event has attracted major international drivers to compete to see who is the fastest to ascend the hill.

== Location ==
The race was located at the Snow Farm ski area in the Cardrona Valley, a 45 minute drive from Queenstown, New Zealand and 20 minutes from Lake Wānaka. The hillclimb was held over a 14.5-kilometre (9.0 mi) gravel course, with an average gradient of 1:11. The 135 turn course climbs from 450 meters (1500 feet) above mean sea level to 1500 meters (5000 feet).

The qualifying session for the race was held on Saturday. The race itself was held on Sunday. The top 10 fastest qualifiers raced in the reverse order from tenth to first.

== Future ==
2007 was the last year of the Race to the Sky. Event organiser Grant Aitken had given up the rights to the event to the Lee family in order to run the 2007 event. The Lee family were the former owners of the access road for Snow Farm resort, the route used for the event. Aitken noted several factors which led to his decision to surrender his right to run the event. They include marginal finances, changes to the tenure of the land used for the event, his team of helpers suffering burnout after a decade running the event, and the need to renew resource consents to continue with the event in the future. Aitken also had a troubled relationship with the Lee family who still own part of the access road. There was difficulty securing Silverstone as the title sponsor of the event, as Silverstone was signed for 2007 at the eleventh hour. Although it was hoped that the event would continue, the 2008 event was cancelled when new organisers could not be found. The event's official website was expired as of 14 October 2007.

On August 13, 2014 it was announced that Race to the Sky would return in 2015 under the management of Highlands Motorsport Park and Tony Quinn. The 2015 race was known as the Repco Race to the Sky presented by Highlands, gaining a new claim to fame as the longest gravel hill climb in the world following the paving of Pikes Peak.

== Overall winners ==
Year	Driver	Car	Time
1998	(Japan) Nobuhiro Tajima	Suzuki Escudo V6 Pikes Peak Special	8:13.60
1999	(Japan) Nobuhiro Tajima	Suzuki Escudo V6 Pikes Peak Special	8:33.13
2000	(Japan) Nobuhiro Tajima	Suzuki Escudo V6 Pikes Peak Special	8:40.91
2001	(New Zealand) Possum Bourne	Subaru Impreza WRC	8:37.01
2002	(New Zealand) Rod Millen	Toyota Hilux	8:43.76
2003	(Japan) Nobuhiro Tajima	Suzuki Aerio Hill Climb Special	8:10.02
2004	(Japan) Nobuhiro Tajima	Suzuki Escudo V6 Pikes Peak Special	8:17.85
2005	(Japan) Nobuhiro Tajima	Suzuki Escudo V6 Pikes Peak Special	8:10.8
2006	(Japan) Nobuhiro Tajima	Suzuki Escudo V6 Pikes Peak Special	8:01.17
2007	(Japan) Nobuhiro Tajima	Suzuki Escudo V6 Pikes Peak Special	8:03.95
2008 - 2014	No Event		
2015	(Scotland) Alister McRae	Subaru Impreza WRC	8:17.616

=== Other notable competitors ===
- (Sweden) Kenneth Eriksson
- (New Zealand) Peggy Bourne
- (New Zealand) Rhys Millen
- (Sweden) Per Eklund
- (United Kingdom) Tony Quinn
- (Australia) Brett Hayward
- (Sweden) Stig Blomqvist

== Current classes ==
The competitors were loosely divided into five groups: bikes; quads; cars; buggies and 4WD’s.
