= Roys Peak =

Mountain in Otago, New Zealand

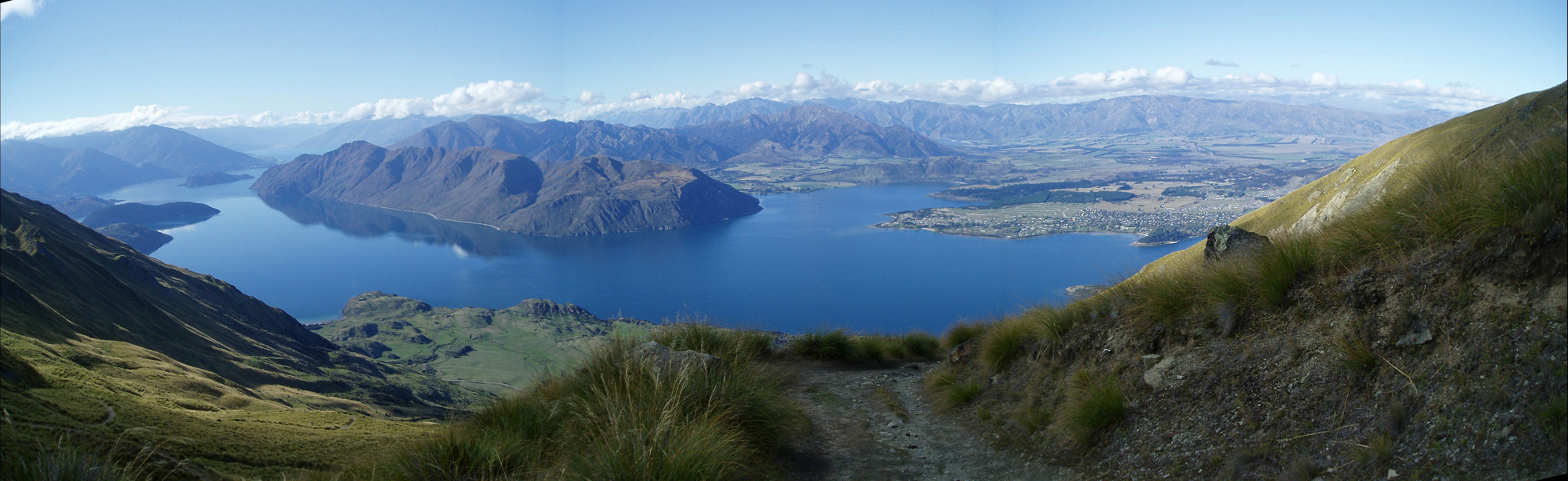

Highest point
- Elevation: 1,578 m (5,177 ft)
- Parent peak: Mount Aspiring / Tititea
- Coordinates: 44°42′S 169°04′E

Geography
- Location: South Island, New Zealand

Roys Peak is a mountain in New Zealand, standing between Wānaka and Glendhu Bay. It offers a full-day's walk with views across Lake Wānaka and up to the peak of Mount Aspiring / Tititea. The track zigzags steeply up the side of Mount Roy through thick grass until the ridge to the summit. The peak was named after an early land settler and land speculator who held the lease on the land.

== See also ==
- List of mountains of New Zealand by height
