= Nobuhiro Tajima =

Japanese rally driver (born 1950)

Personal information
- Nationality: (Japan) Japanese
- Born: June 28, 1950 (age 76)

World Rally Championship record
- Years active: 1981, 1986–1999
- Co-driver: (Japan) Kiyoshi Kawamura (United States) Jean Lindamood (Japan) Kenzo Sudo (Australia) Steve Owers (Australia) Mark Nelson (Australia) Ross Runnalls (Thailand) Visut Sikosi (Australia) Glenn MacNeall (Australia) Claire Parker
- Teams: Suzuki Sport
- Rallies: 21
- Championships: 0
- Rally wins: 0
- Podiums: 0
- Stage wins: 0
- Total points: 4
- First rally: 1981 Lombard RAC Rally
- First win: Not applicable
- Last win: Not applicable
- Last rally: 1999 China Rally

Nobuhiro "Monster" Tajima (Shinjitai: 田嶋 伸博, Tajima Nobuhiro; born Suginami, Tokyo, June 28, 1950; Japanese nickname モンスター田嶋 Monsuta Tajima) is a Japanese hillclimb racer, tuning shop owner, rally team manager and former rally driver who is best known for his participation in Suzuki's rallying program as well as his triumphs at the Pikes Peak International Hillclimb in USA and Silverstone Race to the Sky in NZ (which he won eight times out of eleven events).

== Racing career ==
Tajima made his race debut in 1968 in the All Japan Dirt Trial Championship where he won his first race. His first involvement in the World Rally Championship was in the 1981 Lombard RAC Rally, where he entered a Datsun.

In 1983, Tajima established Monster Sport International, a motorsport preparation shop. In 1986, he sealed his association with Suzuki when he established Suzuki Sport, its in-house motorsport division and returned to the World Rally Championship where he competed driving a Suzuki Cultus in the Olympus Rally.

In 1987, Tajima competed in the Olympus Rally, taking his first class win and finishing 15th overall. He returned again the following year where he won his class again, finishing 7th overall.

From 1991 to 1992, Tajima competed in the Asia-Pacific Rally Championship, including dual APRC/WRC rounds such as Rally Australia and Rally New Zealand. Initially he drove a Suzuki Swift, then switched to a Suzuki Baleno Wagon Kit Car in 1997, and a Suzuki Ignis S1600 in 2001.

As the Junior World Rally Championship project took off in 2002, Tajima decided to retire from rally driving while he was competing in the Asia Pacific Rally to become team manager of Suzuki Sport.

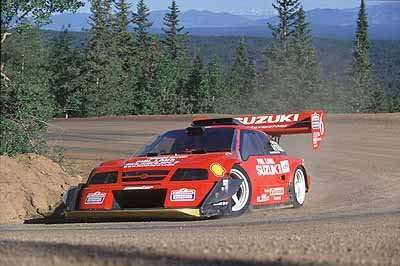
Tajima driving the Escudo V6

Tajima has continued to compete in hillclimbing, which he is best known for. Suzuki and Tajima started the Pikes Peak challenge in 1989. In 1993, with a twin-engined Cultus, Tajima won the Unlimited Division, finishing second overall. In 1995, he achieved an outright victory at Pikes Peak with a twin-engined Escudo, becoming the first Japanese driver to win the event. In 1996, he started driving a car which he became famous for, the V6 Suzuki Escudo. He used this vehicle to win the Silverstone Race to the Sky in the Cardrona Valley in New Zealand for three consecutive years from 1998 to 2000, and to finish runner-up at Pikes Peak three times in 1996, 1998 and 1999.

In 2006, at the Geneva Motor Show, Tajima announced his plan for Suzuki Sport to form the Suzuki World Rally Team, which would field a Suzuki SX4 in 2007. However, World Rally Championship calendar changes meant Suzuki's team debuted in 2008. Tajima took Pikes Peak that year with a newer version of the Escudo. Despite crashing during practice, he achieved another overall victory in a race that was shortened by rain.

On July 21, 2007, Tajima bested Rod Millen's thirteen-year-old course record at the Pikes Peak International Hill Climb in his Suzuki Sport XL7 with a time of 10:01.408. He was the overall winner again in 2008 with the Suzuki XL7 with a time of 10:18.250.

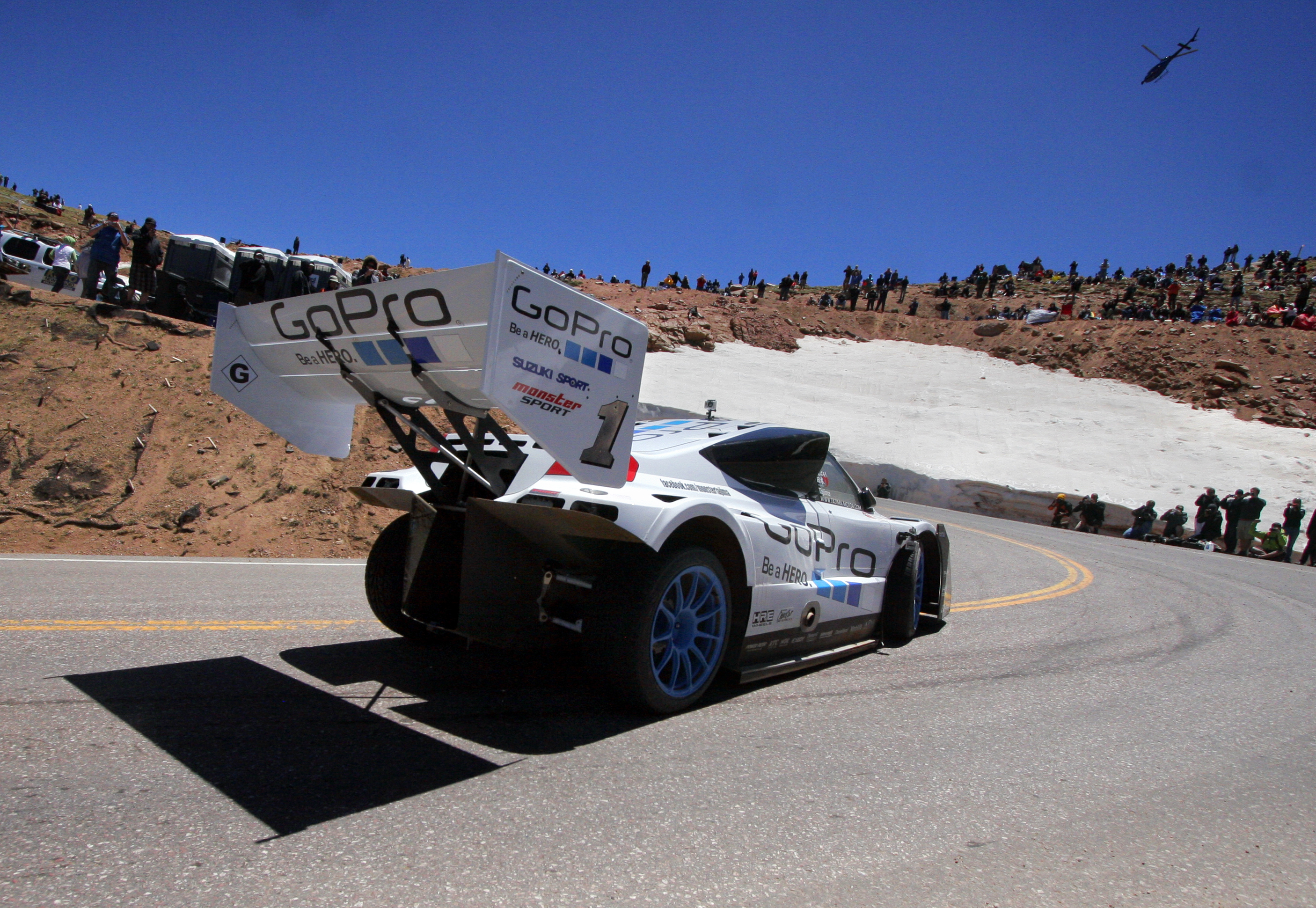
Tajima on his way to breaking the 10 minute barrier of Pikes Peak in 2011

With a new Suzuki SX4, Tajima again won outright in 2009 and 2010, driving up the hill in 10:15.368 and 10:11.490 respectively. On June 26, 2011, Tajima won again, bested his own record and broke the "10 minute barrier" of the Pikes Peak International Hill Climb with a time of 9:51.278, driving the Suzuki SX4 Hill Climb Special, developed by Monster Sport. This was his seventh overall win at Pikes Peak.

For the 2012 Pikes Peak International Hill Climb event, Tajima switched to the electric class, citing concerns about climate change. That year his car was an electric Monster Sport E-RUNNER Pikes Peak Special. Although the clear leader of the class in qualifying, Tajima didn't complete the actual race due to a power transfer problem during his run. In 2013, he won the Electric class and placed 5th overall with a time of 9:46.530 in the Monster Sport E-RUNNER. In 2014, he again improved his time, creating a new record in the electric class with a time of 9:43.90 in the E-RUNNER.

In 2015, Tajima was driving an electric Tajima Rimac E-Runner Concept_One, which was made in collaboration with Rimac Automobili. Tajima finished second overall with a time of a 9:32:401, behind Rhys Millen's 9:07.222 in a Drive eO PP03. In 2016, he came in fifth fastest overall and third of the EV's in his Tajima Rimac E-Runner Concept_One, behind Rhys Millen and Tetsuya Yamano. With a time of 9:51.978, the car was unable to beat last year's time (9:32.401), which itself was handicapped by a brake and overheating issues.

In all, Tajima has taken nine All Japan Dirt Trial Championship titles, four WRC class wins, two class wins in the Asia-Pacific Rally championship, seven overall Pikes Peak wins between 1995 and 2011, and eight overall Race to the Sky victories from 1998 to 2007. He also scored four points in the 1988 World Rally Championship season and finished 4th in the 2001 Asia-Pacific Rally championship for drivers.

== Awards and honors ==
- Pikes Peak Hill Climb Museum Hall of Fame (2016)
