= Criffel Range =

Mountain range in New Zealand

Coordinates: 44°51′S 169°05′E

The Criffel Range is a range of mountains in Central Otago, in the South Island of New Zealand.

The range lies parallel and to the east of the Crown Range, from which it is separated by the valley of the Cardrona River, and by the route of the Crown Range Road, New Zealand's highest paved highway. To the west of the Criffel Range lies another parallel ridge, the Pisa Range. Between them, the Criffel and Pisa Ranges form a massif which is notable as being part of the alluvial gold field which was at the heart of the Otago Gold Rush of 1861–63. The Criffel Range forms part of the greater Pisa Range fault-block mountain which separates the Cardrona Valley from the Upper Clutha Valley. The Pisa and Criffel Ranges are separated by a strath, a broad, generally gently undulating valley.

A tortuous road runs into the Criffel Range from Cardrona, leading to the Snow Farm ski field and lodge, the main current human activity within the range.

== Peaks and streams ==
The range runs roughly north-northeast to south-southwest for a distance of some 35 kilometres (22 mi), starting south of the town of Wānaka and extending until it is halted by the valley of the Kawarau River near Gibbston. Peaks in the range, from north to south, include Criffel Peak (1,282 metres (4,206 ft)), Little Criffel (1,341 metres (4,400 ft)), Queensberry Hill (1,531 metres (5,023 ft)), Quartz Knoll (1,593 metres (5,226 ft)), and Mount Allen (1,492 metres (4,895 ft), not to be confused with Mount Allan, which lies further to the east in The Silverpeaks range). Rock Peak (1,375 metres (4,511 ft)) and Mount Hocken (1,282 metres (4,206 ft)) lie at the range's southern end. The isolated hill of Mount Barker (596 metres (1,955 ft)) lies immediately to the north of the range.

Numerous streams have their courses across the high broad valley that lies between the Criffel and Pisa Ranges. Most notable among these is the Roaring Meg, a fast-running creek which powers one of New Zealand's oldest hydroelectric stations before joining the Kawarau River. Other creeks separating the two ranges include the Luggate Burn and Alice Burn, both of which flow north before joining the Clutha River close to Luggate.
