= Crown Range Road =

Road in New Zealand

Coordinates: 44°59′31″S 168°56′20″E

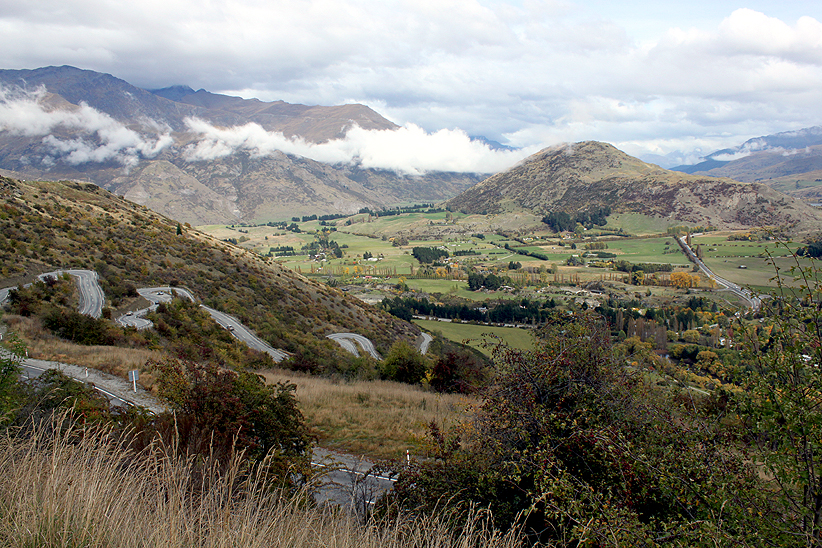
The zig zag section of the road climbing the Crown Range near Arrowtown

The Crown Range Road is a New Zealand highway (formerly known as State Highway 89) that winds steeply east and north between Arrow Junction, just south of Arrowtown, and Wānaka, in the Otago Region of the South Island.

Travelling from Arrowtown towards Wānaka, the Crown Range Road starts at the bottom of the "zig zag". This steep and winding section climbs to the Crown Terrace, a large flat and fertile area capable of growing grain crops. To the left, Glencoe Road leads to Glencoe Station, the large high country station behind Arrowtown. At the end of the Crown Terrace is the Eastburn Road to Eastburn Station, which runs from the Glencoe boundary almost to Cardrona.

Just past the Eastburn Road the road twists eastward and climbs up to the Crown Saddle, where a bronze plaque at the vista point claims that this summit, at 1,076 metres (3,530 ft), is the highest sealed road in New Zealand. It is the highest sealed local road and the highest sealed pass or through road, two metres higher than the Desert Road summit on State Highway 1 in the North Island.

From the Crown Saddle the road continues north following the Cardrona Creek, which becomes the Cardrona River, flowing down a snow tussock valley until it opens out at the small settlement of Cardrona. The valley separates the Crown Range in the west from the Criffel Range in the east.

In 2001, the last section of the Crown Range Road was sealed by the Queenstown-Lakes District Council.
