= Mount Cardrona =

Mountain in Otago Region, New Zealand

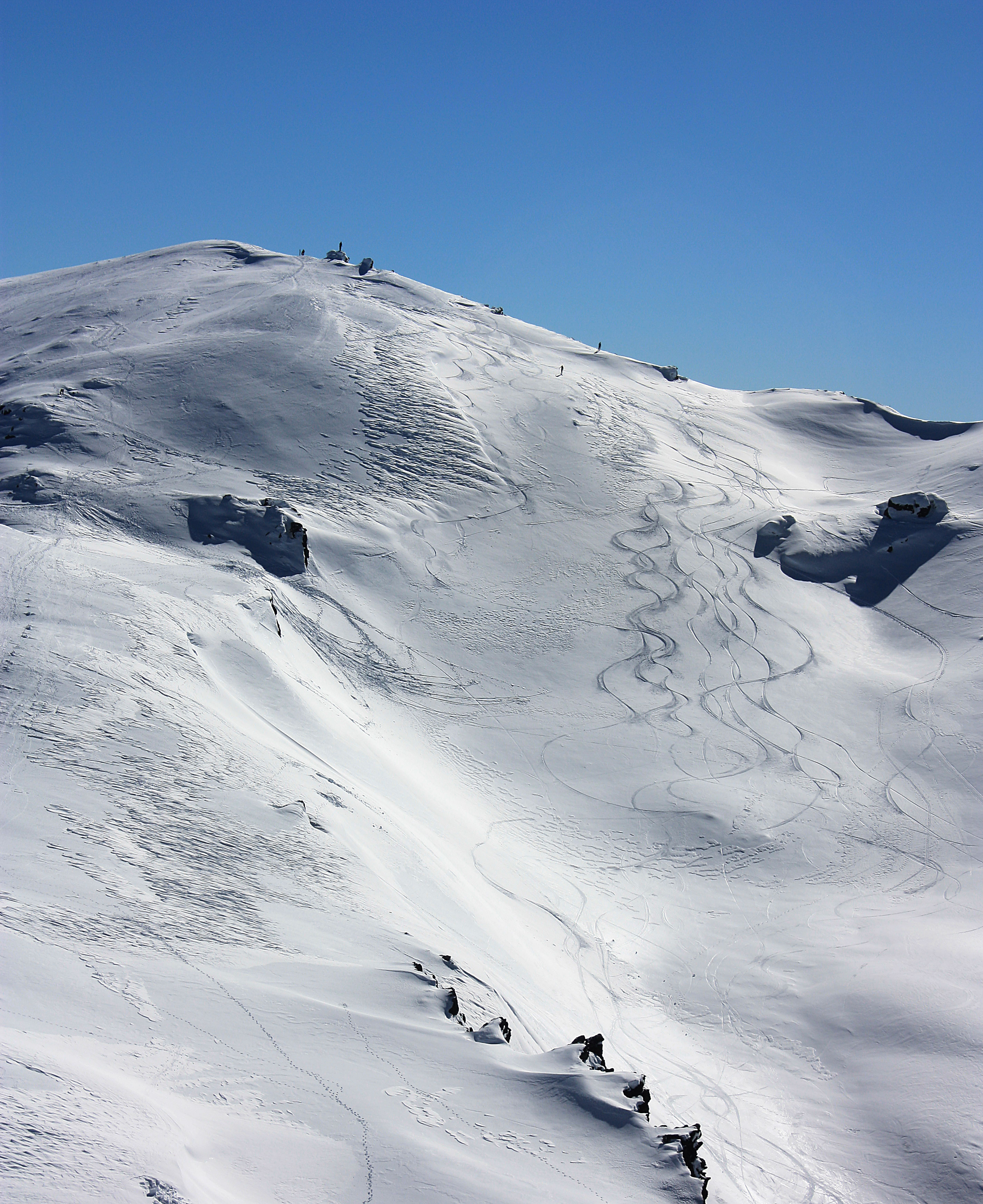
- Mount Cardrona

Highest point
- Elevation: 1,936 m (6,352 ft)
- Coordinates: 44°51′05″S 168°56′22″E

Geography

Mount Cardrona in Central Otago, New Zealand is 1,936 metres (6,352 feet) high, and is most easily accessed from the Cardrona Ski Field. Mount Cardrona is in the Crown Range between Wānaka and Queenstown. The often photographed and historic Cardrona Hotel is located at its bottom of the access road that leads up to the Cardrona ski field.
