= Cardrona, New Zealand =

Cardrona
- Rural locality
- Cardrona road sign
- Interactive map of Cardrona
- Coordinates: 44°52′S 169°00′E
- Country: New Zealand
- Region: Otago
- Territorial authority: Queenstown Lakes District
- Ward: Wānaka-Upper Clutha Ward
- Community: Wānaka-Upper Clutha Community
- Electorates: Waitaki; Te Tai Tonga (Māori)

Government
  - Territorial authority: Queenstown-Lakes District Council
  - Regional council: Otago Regional Council
  - Mayor of Queenstown-Lakes: John Glover
  - Waitaki MP: Miles Anderson
  - Te Tai Tonga MP: Tākuta Ferris

Area
  - Total: 857.83 km^{2} (331.21 sq mi)

Population (June 2025)
  - Total: 840
  - Density: 0.98/km^{2} (2.5/sq mi)
- Postcode: 9382

Cardrona is a locality in the Cardrona Valley in New Zealand, with the nearby skifield of Cardrona Alpine Resort and Mount Cardrona also using the same name. Established as a gold rush township in the 1860s on the banks of the small river of the same name, it is known for its distinctive hotel of gold rush vintage which is on the opposite side of the river to the original township of which few buildings remain. It is in a scenic setting on the Crown Range road which connects Wānaka and Queenstown.

== History ==
The town is named after the Cardrona River, which itself was named after the Cardrona River in Scotland by Robert Wilkin.

In 1863 the town was laid out with the initial buildings being of a temporary nature. Eventually more permanent structures were constructed. During the height of the gold rush around Cardrona the town had several hotels and saloons. In 1867 most miners started to leave for more prosperous claims and around 600 Chinese miners filled the town. Two valuable claims were discovered later and the town flourished again, with a bank, school, police station, and gaol. The town prospered until 1878 when a flood filled up most claims, leading to most residents moving elsewhere.

Cardrona was originally a gold mining town but in the 1980s it became a tourist destination.

== Climate ==
Climate data for Cardrona (Cardrona Township), elevation 580 m (1,900 ft), (1991–2020)
Month	Jan	Feb	Mar	Apr	May	Jun	Jul	Aug	Sep	Oct	Nov	Dec	Year
Mean daily maximum °C (°F)	21.2 (70.2)	21.0 (69.8)	18.0 (64.4)	14.4 (57.9)	10.3 (50.5)	6.5 (43.7)	6.1 (43.0)	8.7 (47.7)	11.8 (53.2)	14.4 (57.9)	16.1 (61.0)	19.0 (66.2)	14.0 (57.1)
Mean daily minimum °C (°F)	7.6 (45.7)	7.8 (46.0)	6.1 (43.0)	3.2 (37.8)	0.8 (33.4)	−1.1 (30.0)	−2.6 (27.3)	−1.2 (29.8)	1.0 (33.8)	2.9 (37.2)	4.9 (40.8)	7.3 (45.1)	3.1 (37.5)
Average rainfall mm (inches)	55.4 (2.18)	42.0 (1.65)	45.7 (1.80)	46.6 (1.83)	60.2 (2.37)	56.3 (2.22)	46.2 (1.82)	52.5 (2.07)	50.0 (1.97)	50.9 (2.00)	54.5 (2.15)	57.6 (2.27)	617.9 (24.33)
Mean monthly sunshine hours	231.5	201.7	182.6	164.0	135.5	120.5	126.6	155.8	172.5	193.8	202.2	212.1	2,098.8
Source 1: NIWA
Source 2: Lake Wanaka (sun)

Cardrona was originally a gold mining town but in the 1980s it became a tourist destination.

== Notable buildings ==
Galvin's Cottage is a rammed-earth home constructed in 1862.

== Demographics ==
The Cardrona statistical area covers 857.83 km^{2} (331.21 sq mi) and had an estimated population of 840 as of June 2025, with a population density of 0.98 people per km^{2}.

Historical population
Year	Pop.	±% p.a.
2006	429	—
2013	507	+2.42%
2018	633	+4.54%

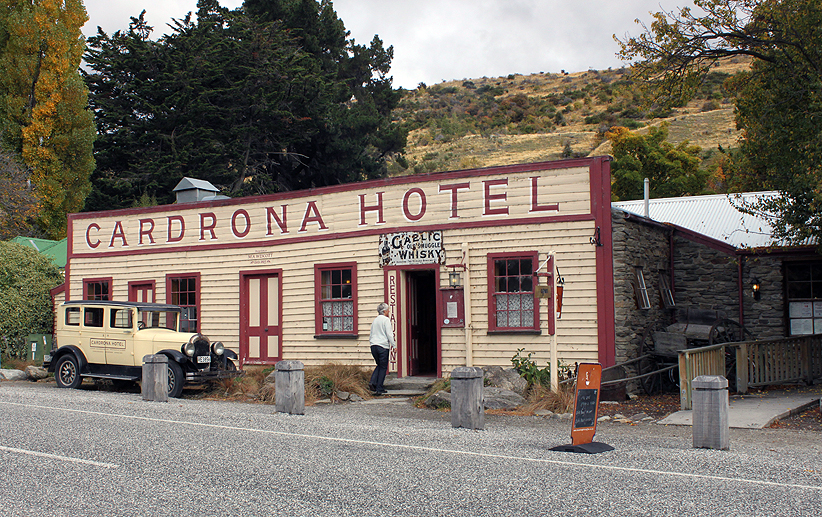
The Cardrona Hotel

Cardrona had a population of 633 at the 2018 New Zealand census, an increase of 126 people (24.9%) since the 2013 census, and an increase of 204 people (47.6%) since the 2006 census. There were 309 households, comprising 333 males and 303 females, giving a sex ratio of 1.1 males per female. The median age was 45.9 years (compared with 37.4 years nationally), with 99 people (15.6%) aged under 15 years, 93 (14.7%) aged 15 to 29, 321 (50.7%) aged 30 to 64, and 120 (19.0%) aged 65 or older.

Ethnicities were 96.7% European/Pākehā, 4.7% Māori, 0.9% Pasifika, 1.4% Asian, and 1.9% other ethnicities. People may identify with more than one ethnicity.

The percentage of people born overseas was 21.8, compared with 27.1% nationally.

Although some people chose not to answer the census's question about religious affiliation, 58.3% had no religion, 33.2% were Christian, 0.5% were Hindu, 0.5% were Muslim and 1.4% had other religions.

Of those at least 15 years old, 165 (30.9%) people had a bachelor's or higher degree, and 48 (9.0%) people had no formal qualifications. The median income was $42,200, compared with $31,800 nationally. 120 people (22.5%) earned over $70,000 compared to 17.2% nationally. The employment status of those at least 15 was that 309 (57.9%) people were employed full-time, 102 (19.1%) were part-time, and 6 (1.1%) were unemployed.
