= Wānaka =

Resort town in Otago, New Zealand

Wānaka Wānaka (Māori)
- Town
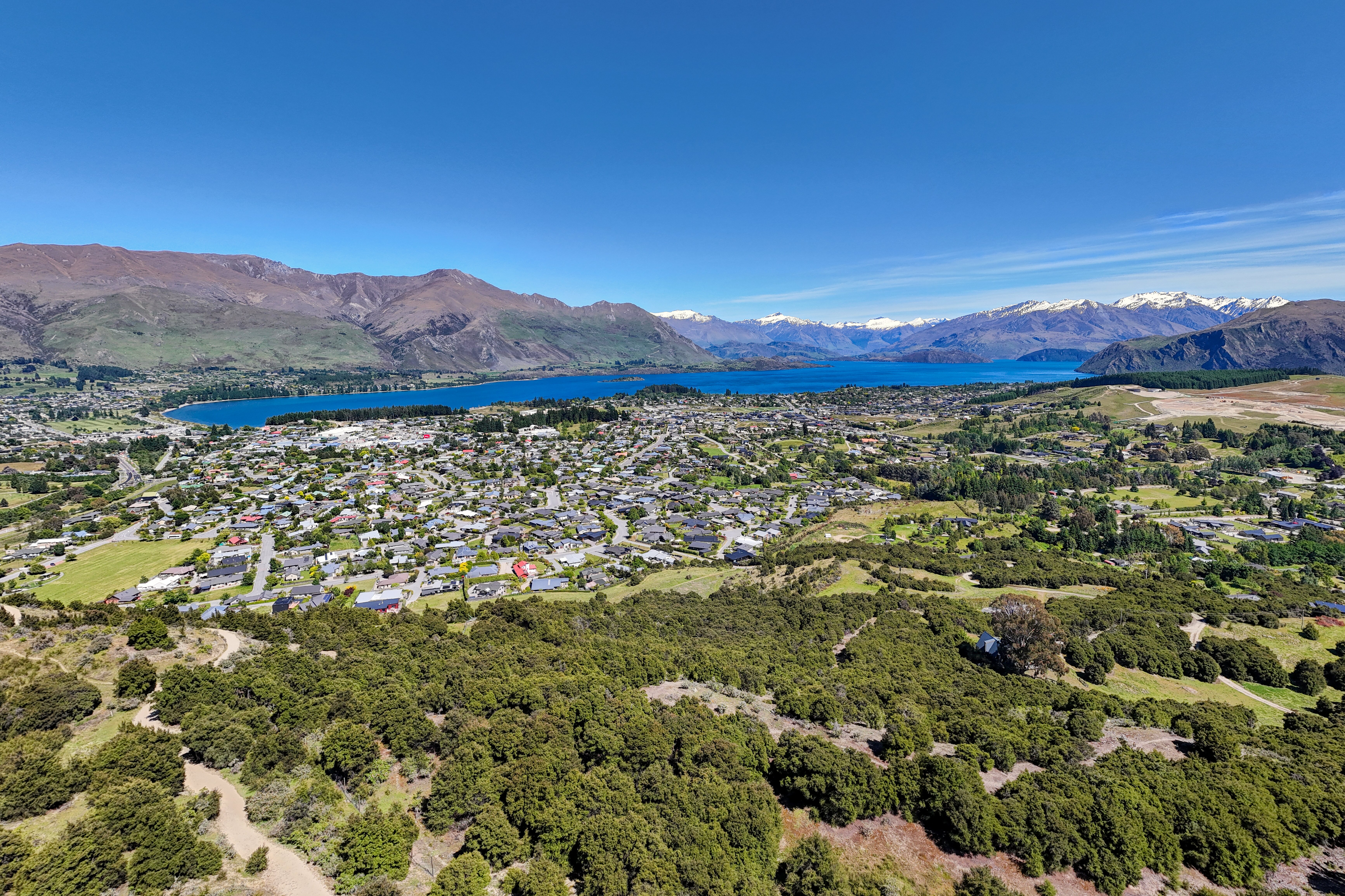
- Wānaka in November 2024
- Interactive map of Wānaka
- Coordinates: 44°42′S 169°09′E
- Country: New Zealand
- Region: Otago
- Territorial authority: Queenstown Lakes District
- Ward: Wānaka-Upper Clutha Ward
- Community: Wānaka-Upper Clutha Community
- Electorates: Waitaki; Te Tai Tonga (Māori)

Government
  - Territorial authority: Queenstown-Lakes District Council
  - Regional council: Otago Regional Council
  - Mayor of Queenstown-Lakes: John Glover
  - Waitaki MP: Miles Anderson
  - Te Tai Tonga MP: Mananui Ramsden

Area
  - Total: 28.61 km^{2} (11.05 sq mi)
- Elevation: 290 m (950 ft)

Population (June 2025)
  - Total: 13,200
  - Density: 461/km^{2} (1,190/sq mi)
- Time zone: UTC+12 (NZST)
  - Summer (DST): UTC+13 (NZDT)
- Postcode: 9305
- Area code: 03
- Local iwi: Ngāi Tahu

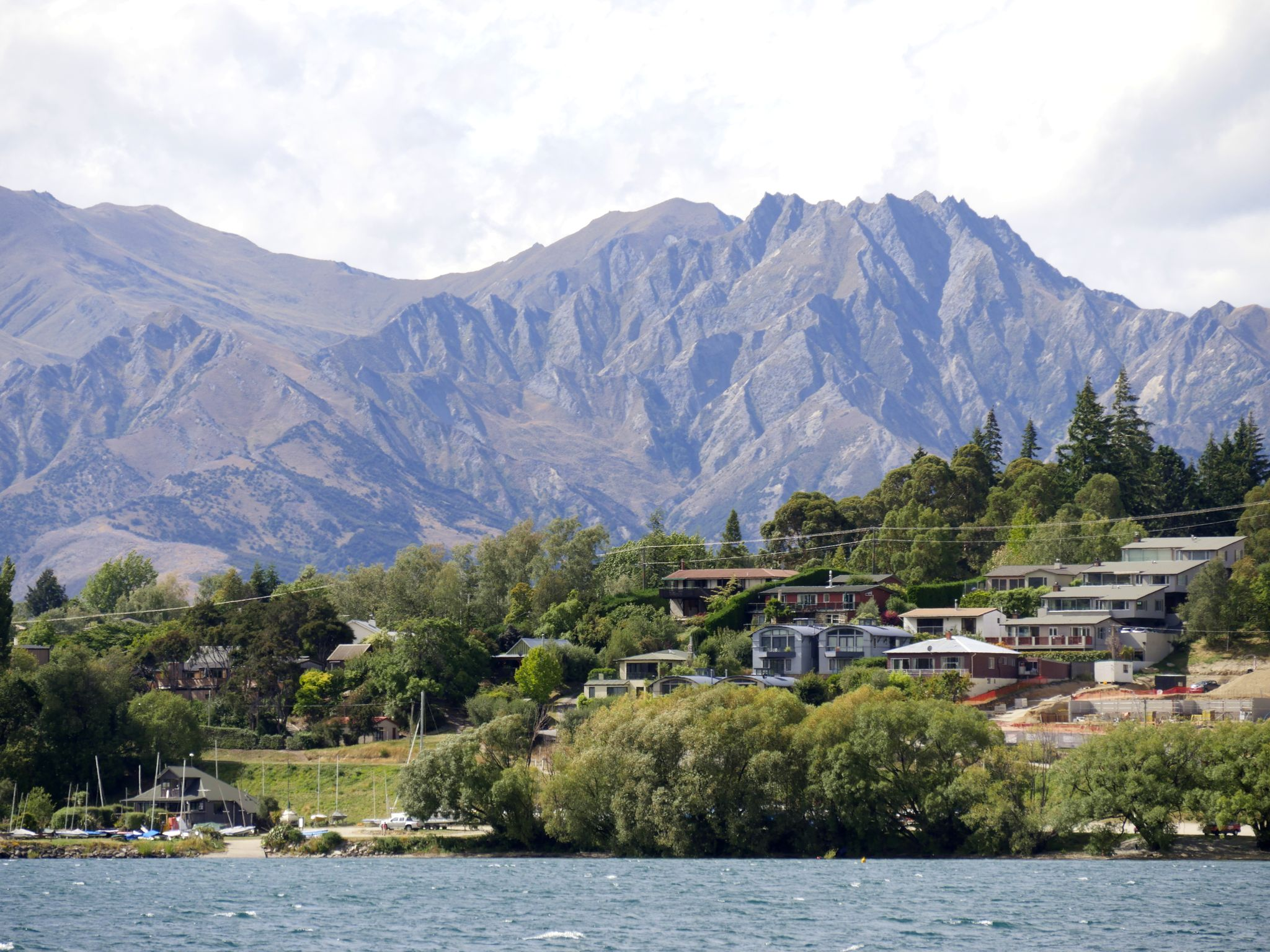
Wānaka east, with mountains in the background

Wānaka (Māori pronunciation: [ˈwaːnaka]) is a ski and summer resort town in the Otago region of the South Island of New Zealand. At the southern end of Lake Wānaka, it is at the start of the Clutha River and is the gateway to Mount Aspiring National Park.

Wānaka is primarily a resort town with both summer and winter seasons. Its economy is based on the many outdoor opportunities this offers.

Historically, Māori visited the Wānaka area to hunt and fish in summer, or on their way to seek pounamu (greenstone) on the West Coast. Ngāi Tahu abandoned their seasonal camps after a raid by a North Island war party in 1836.

Along with the rest of the Queenstown-Lakes District, Wānaka is one of the fastest-growing towns in New Zealand, with the population tripling between 2000 and 2020.

== Etymology ==
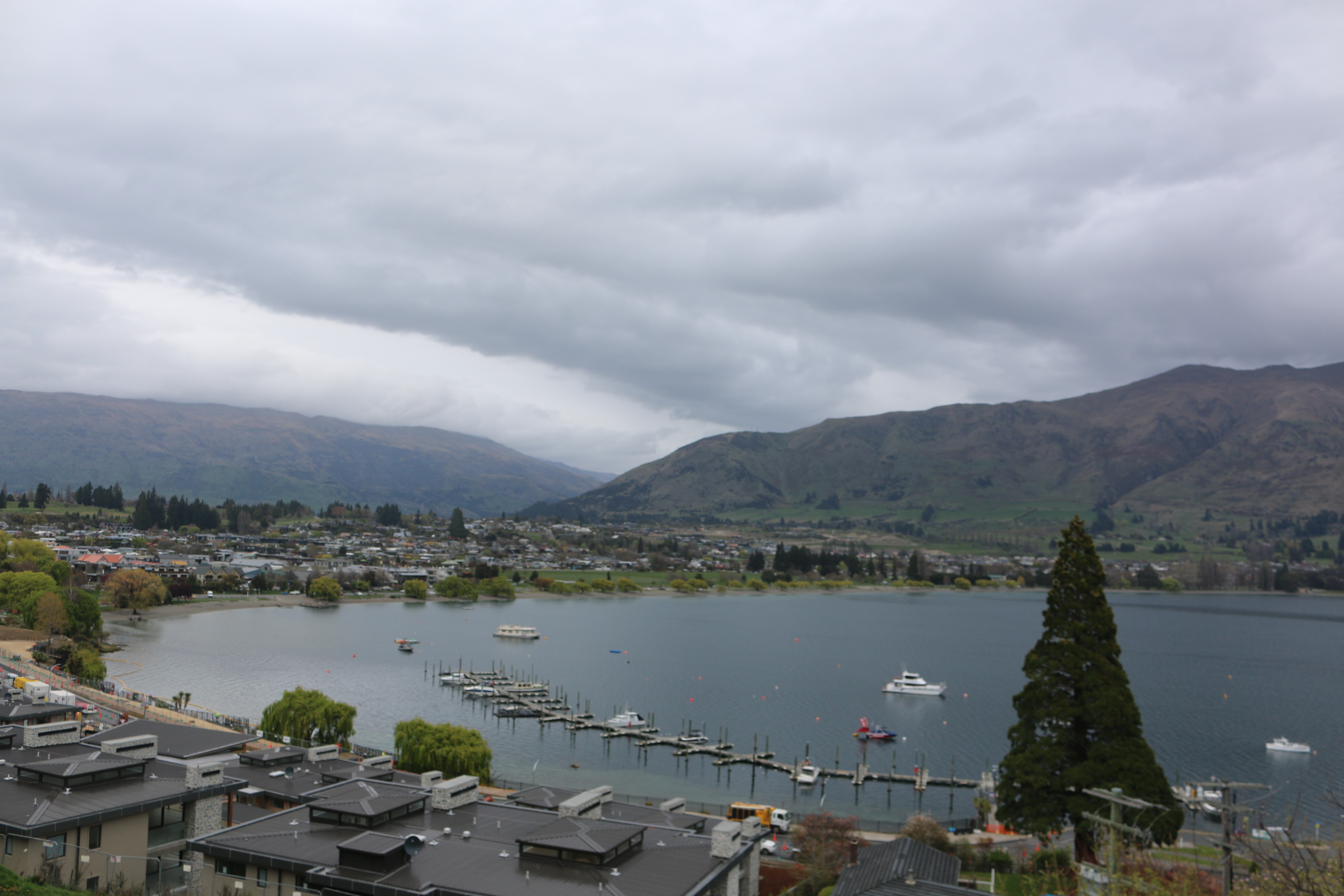
View of the Wānaka township (October 2021)

The name of the town comes from the lake it sits upon, Lake Wānaka. The town was originally named Wanaka but was changed just a month later to Pembroke, after the youngest son of the Earl of Pembroke, Sidney Herbert, who was the 1855 Colonial Secretary and a member of the Canterbury Association. On 1 September 1940 the name was changed back to Wanaka to reduce confusion between the names of the town and the lake.

Wānaka is the South Island dialect form of wānanga, which means 'sacred knowledge or a place of learning'. Edward Shortland reported the name as a corruption of O-Anake or O-Anaka meaning 'place of Anake/Anaka', but that is disputed by Ngāi Tahu who consider Oanaka to be a transcription error.

The name of the town was altered to Wānaka in 2021.

== History ==
Māori settled the area as early as 1350AD. Their burnoffs of forest cover dramatically changed the landscape to one dominated by ferns and shrubs. Charcoal deposited in the lake indicates continuous usage of the area since then.

A Kāti Māmoe settlement at the site of modern Wānaka was named Para karehu. The area was invaded by the Ngāi Tahu in the early 18th century. Ngāi Tahu visited annually, seeking greenstone in the mountains above the Haast River and hunting eels and birds over summer, then returning to the east coast by descending the Clutha River in reed boats called mōkihi. Their settlement Take Kārara included a pā and a kāinga mahinga kai (food-gathering site) where pora ('Māori turnip'), mahetau, tuna (eels), and weka were gathered. Eels and birds were gathered at a lagoon Manuhaea on the Hāwea side of The Neck, which also supported gardens of potato and turnips.

Ngāi Tahu use of the land was ended by attacks by North Island tribes. In 1836, the Ngāti Tama chief Te Pūoho led a 100-person war party, armed with muskets, down the West Coast and over the Haast Pass. They fell on the Ngāi Tahu encampment between Lake Wānaka and Lake Hāwea, capturing ten people and killing and eating two children. Some of the Ngāi Tahu fled down the Waitaki river to the coast. Te Puoho took his captives over the Crown Range to Lake Wakatipu and thence to Southland where he was killed and his war party destroyed by the southern Ngāi Tahu leader Tūhawaiki.

The first known map of Lake Wānaka was drawn in 1844 by the southern Ngāi Tahu leader Te Huruhuru. The first European to visit the area was Nathanael Chalmers, who was guided inland by Chiefs Reko and Kaikōura in 1853. Reko and Kaikōura showed Chalmers the rock bridge Whatatorere at Roaring Meg, which was the only place that the Kawarau River could be jumped over, and returned him down the Clutha in a mōkihi reed boat – arguably the first recorded instance of adventure tourism in the region.

European settlement began in the Upper Clutha River Valley in the 1850s, with the establishment of sheep stations by runholders. The first station was at Albert Town, the only place where settlers could ford the Clutha River. The present site of Wānaka was first surveyed in 1863. Gold was discovered in the nearby Cardrona valley in 1862 with many joining the gold rush. Settlement increased in Pembroke during the 1870s because of timber milling in the Matukituki Valley that used Lake Wānaka for transport.

Mass tourism began in 1867 when Theodore Russell opened the first hotel, and with the world's first sheepdog trials. The first school in the area was opened in Albert Town in 1868. The Pembroke post office opened in 1873; the Pembroke school opened in 1880 (it became the Wanaka District High School in 1940). In 1885 the Commercial Hotel opened in Pembroke, and in 1887 the Wanaka Library opened on Ardmore Street. In 1922, the First Wānaka Hotel was destroyed by fire and was replaced the following year by the Wanaka Public Hall. Wānaka was connected to the national electricity grid in 1940.

Wānaka proved a very popular tourist destination because of its borderline continental climate and easy access to snow and water. With the development of Treble Cone (1968) and Cardrona ski fields (1980), Wānaka grew in popularity as a winter destination.

Wānaka expanded rapidly in the early 2000s, with annual growth peaking at 11% in 2002 when the population reached 5,000 residents. The population passed 10,000 in 2014, and by 2025 had increased to over 18,000 people - over a third of the Queenstown-Lakes District.

== Geography ==
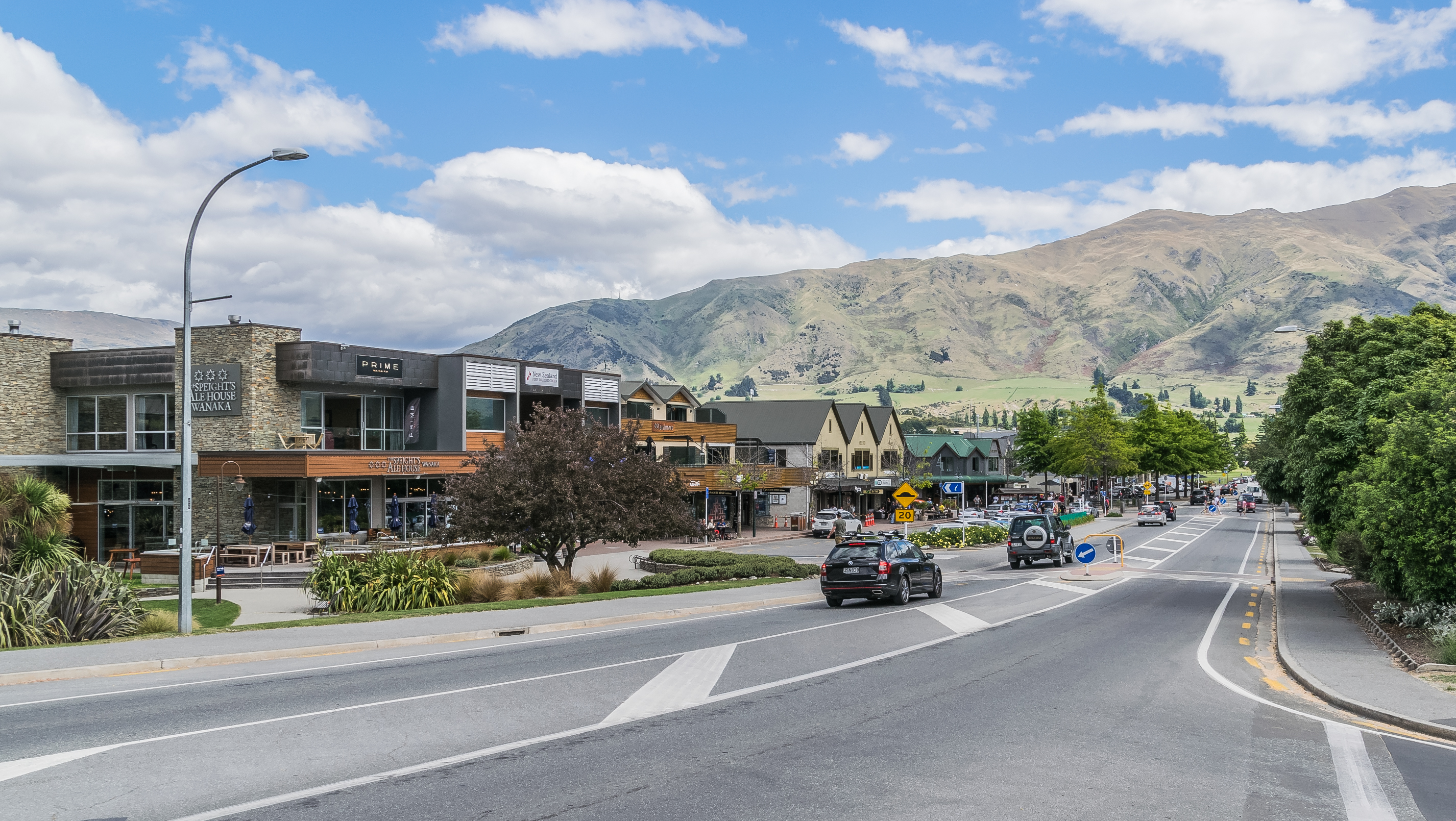
Wānaka cafe strip in 2017

The town of Wānaka is at the southern end of Lake Wānaka on Roys Bay, and is surrounded by mountains. To the southwest are the Crown and Criffel Ranges and town of Queenstown, 120 kilometres (75 mi) away. To the north the Haast Pass cuts through the Southern Alps near Makarora. To the northeast are the towns of Omarama and Twizel. Lake Wānaka comes within 1 km of the slightly smaller Lake Hāwea; they are separated only by rocky ridge called "The Neck". South of Wānaka, the wide Upper Clutha valley leads to Cromwell at the junction of the Kawarau and Clutha rivers.

Glendhu Bay is on the lake's western shore, close to the Matukituki River valley which gives access to the Mount Aspiring National Park.

The centre of the town lies on flat land beside Roys Bay. The town has expanded into the hills surrounding the centre and in both directions along the lake shore. The lakeside area of the town is prone to occasional flooding in spring when heavy rain and snowmelt can cause the lake to rise quickly, as in November 1999.

=== Climate ===
Despite New Zealand's mostly oceanic climate, Wānaka is one of the few areas in the country to enjoy a semi-continental climate, with four distinct seasons. The weather is fairly dry, with spring (September–December) being the wettest season. Annual rainfall is 682 mm which is half the national average. Wānaka's summers are warm, with temperatures reaching the high 20s and an average summer maximum of 24 °C (75 °F). Wānaka's highest-ever temperature of 35.2 °C (95.4 °F) was recorded in January 2018.

Winter can be extreme by New Zealand standards with temperature mostly in the single digits during the day time followed by cold and frosty nights and frequent snowfalls.

Climate data for Wānaka (Wānaka Airport), elevation 348 m (1,142 ft), (1991–2020)
Month	Jan	Feb	Mar	Apr	May	Jun	Jul	Aug	Sep	Oct	Nov	Dec	Year
Record high °C (°F)	35.2 (95.4)	34.5 (94.1)	30.8 (87.4)	25.3 (77.5)	23.9 (75.0)	17.8 (64.0)	17.2 (63.0)	18.6 (65.5)	22.6 (72.7)	26.5 (79.7)	31.4 (88.5)	32.2 (90.0)	35.2 (95.4)
Mean daily maximum °C (°F)	23.8 (74.8)	23.8 (74.8)	20.7 (69.3)	16.4 (61.5)	12.3 (54.1)	8.5 (47.3)	8.1 (46.6)	10.7 (51.3)	13.8 (56.8)	16.4 (61.5)	19.1 (66.4)	21.9 (71.4)	16.3 (61.3)
Daily mean °C (°F)	17.3 (63.1)	17.2 (63.0)	14.4 (57.9)	10.8 (51.4)	7.5 (45.5)	4.3 (39.7)	3.7 (38.7)	5.7 (42.3)	8.4 (47.1)	10.7 (51.3)	13.0 (55.4)	15.6 (60.1)	10.7 (51.3)
Mean daily minimum °C (°F)	10.9 (51.6)	10.6 (51.1)	8.1 (46.6)	5.2 (41.4)	2.8 (37.0)	0.1 (32.2)	−0.6 (30.9)	0.8 (33.4)	3.0 (37.4)	4.9 (40.8)	6.9 (44.4)	9.3 (48.7)	5.2 (41.3)
Record low °C (°F)	0 (32)	0.2 (32.4)	−1.7 (28.9)	−4 (25)	−7.5 (18.5)	−8.2 (17.2)	−8.6 (16.5)	−6.6 (20.1)	−5.7 (21.7)	−3 (27)	−2.5 (27.5)	−0.4 (31.3)	−8.6 (16.5)
Average rainfall mm (inches)	55.4 (2.18)	42.0 (1.65)	45.7 (1.80)	46.6 (1.83)	60.2 (2.37)	56.3 (2.22)	46.2 (1.82)	52.5 (2.07)	50.0 (1.97)	50.9 (2.00)	54.5 (2.15)	57.6 (2.27)	617.9 (24.33)
Mean monthly sunshine hours	231.5	201.7	182.6	164.0	135.5	120.5	126.6	155.8	172.5	193.8	202.2	212.1	2,098.8
Source 1: NIWA
Source 2: Lake Wanaka (sun)

Climate data for Albert Town (1941–1970)
Month	Jan	Feb	Mar	Apr	May	Jun	Jul	Aug	Sep	Oct	Nov	Dec	Year
Mean daily maximum °C (°F)	24.5 (76.1)	24.5 (76.1)	21.0 (69.8)	17.0 (62.6)	12.0 (53.6)	8.5 (47.3)	8.5 (47.3)	11.0 (51.8)	15.5 (59.9)	17.5 (63.5)	19.5 (67.1)	22.5 (72.5)	16.8 (62.3)
Daily mean °C (°F)	17.3 (63.1)	17.0 (62.6)	14.3 (57.7)	10.3 (50.5)	6.5 (43.7)	3.3 (37.9)	3.0 (37.4)	5.0 (41.0)	8.5 (47.3)	10.8 (51.4)	12.8 (55.0)	15.5 (59.9)	10.4 (50.6)
Mean daily minimum °C (°F)	10.0 (50.0)	9.5 (49.1)	7.5 (45.5)	3.5 (38.3)	1.0 (33.8)	−2.0 (28.4)	−2.5 (27.5)	−1.0 (30.2)	1.5 (34.7)	4.0 (39.2)	6.0 (42.8)	8.5 (47.3)	3.8 (38.9)
Source: NIWA

== Demography ==
Wānaka covers 28.61 km^{2} (11.05 sq mi) and had an estimated population of 13,200 as of June 2025, with a population density of 461 people per km^{2}. It is the country's 43rd-largest urban area and the fifth-largest urban area in Otago behind Dunedin, Queenstown, Mosgiel and Oamaru.

Historical population
Year	Pop.	±% p.a.
1996	2,600	—
2001	3,450	+5.82%
2006	5,043	+7.89%
2013	6,474	+3.63%
2018	9,552	+8.09%
The boundaries for dates earlier than 2006 may differ Source:

Wānaka had a population of 9,552 at the 2018 New Zealand census, an increase of 3,078 people (47.5%) since the 2013 census, and an increase of 4,509 people (89.4%) since the 2006 census. There were 3,480 households, comprising 4,719 males and 4,842 females, giving a sex ratio of 0.97 males per female, with 1,662 people (17.4%) aged under 15 years, 1,611 (16.9%) aged 15 to 29, 4,599 (48.1%) aged 30 to 64, and 1,695 (17.7%) aged 65 or older.

Ethnicities were 92.7% European/Pākehā, 5.2% Māori, 0.5% Pasifika, 4.5% Asian, and 2.5% other ethnicities. People may identify with more than one ethnicity.

The percentage of people born overseas was 28.9, compared with 27.1% nationally.

Although some people chose not to answer the census's question about religious affiliation, 60.7% had no religion, 31.2% were Christian, 1.0% were Hindu, 0.2% were Muslim, 0.5% were Buddhist and 1.7% had other religions.

Of those at least 15 years old, 2,340 (29.7%) people had a bachelor's or higher degree, and 720 (9.1%) people had no formal qualifications. 1,641 people (20.8%) earned over $70,000 compared to 17.2% nationally. The employment status of those at least 15 was that 4,386 (55.6%) people were employed full-time, 1,323 (16.8%) were part-time, and 72 (0.9%) were unemployed.

Individual statistical areas
Name	Area (km^{2})	Population	Density (per km^{2})	Households	Median age	Median income
Wanaka Waterfront	3.89	2,121	549	765	42.4 years	$38,000
Wanaka North	7.77	2,412	210	816	35.2 years	$40,700
Wanaka West	4.42	1,725	390	669	45.8 years	$40,900
Albert Town	4.96	2,031	409	687	37.3 years	$41,700
Wanaka Central	7.56	1,263	167	543	46.3 years	$33,900
New Zealand					37.4 years	$31,800

== Government ==
Wānaka is in the Waitaki electorate, represented by the New Zealand National Party's Miles Anderson since 2023.

Wānaka's local governments are the Queenstown-Lakes District Council and the Otago Regional Council.

== Wānaka wine sub-region ==
The area around Wānaka is a formal sub-region of the Central Otago wine region with several top wineries and vineyards. As with other parts of the wine region, the main grape variety in the area is pinot noir.

== Attractions ==
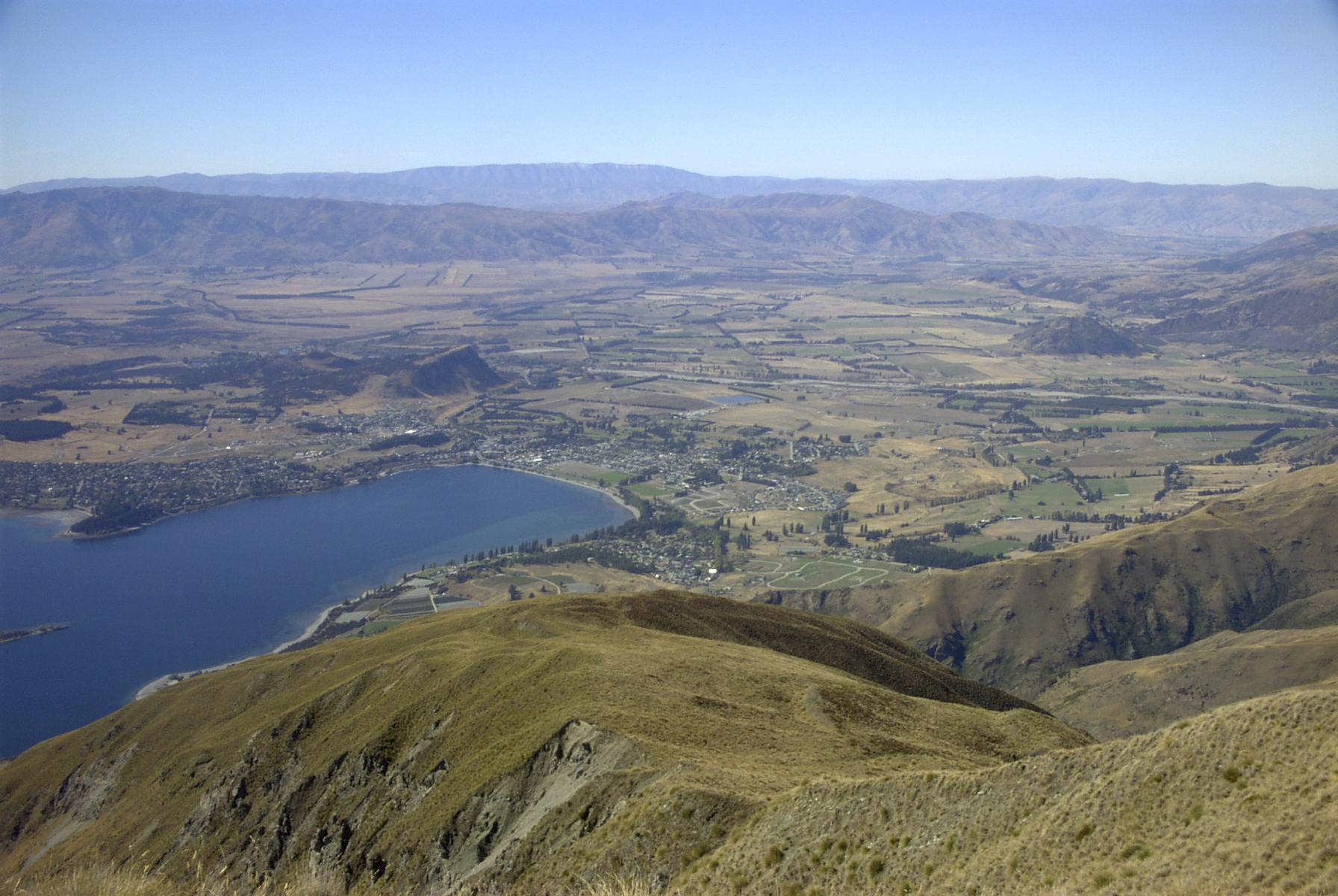
View of Wānaka from Mount Roy

With its lake and mountain views, Wānaka has become a popular tourist resort, considered less commercialised than Queenstown.

Wānaka boasts a growing number of restaurants, cafes and a diverse nightlife. Other attractions in the town include Puzzling World and the Paradiso Cinema. Puzzling World contains a maze, optical illusions and a leaning clocktower. The Paradiso is a classic old cinema, with seating consisting of old couches and an in-theatre Morris Minor. There are several wineries in the area. Just out of town next to the Wānaka Airport is the National Transport and Toy Museum.

In winter, Wānaka is a suitable place to see the Southern Lights.

A number of mountains surrounding Wānaka can be climbed, including Roys Peak, Mount Iron, Mount Grand and the Pisa Range, all of which provide views of the surrounding area.

"That Wānaka Tree" – a willow growing just inside the lake – is a tourist attraction in its own right, featuring on many tourists' Instagram feeds.

=== Festivals ===
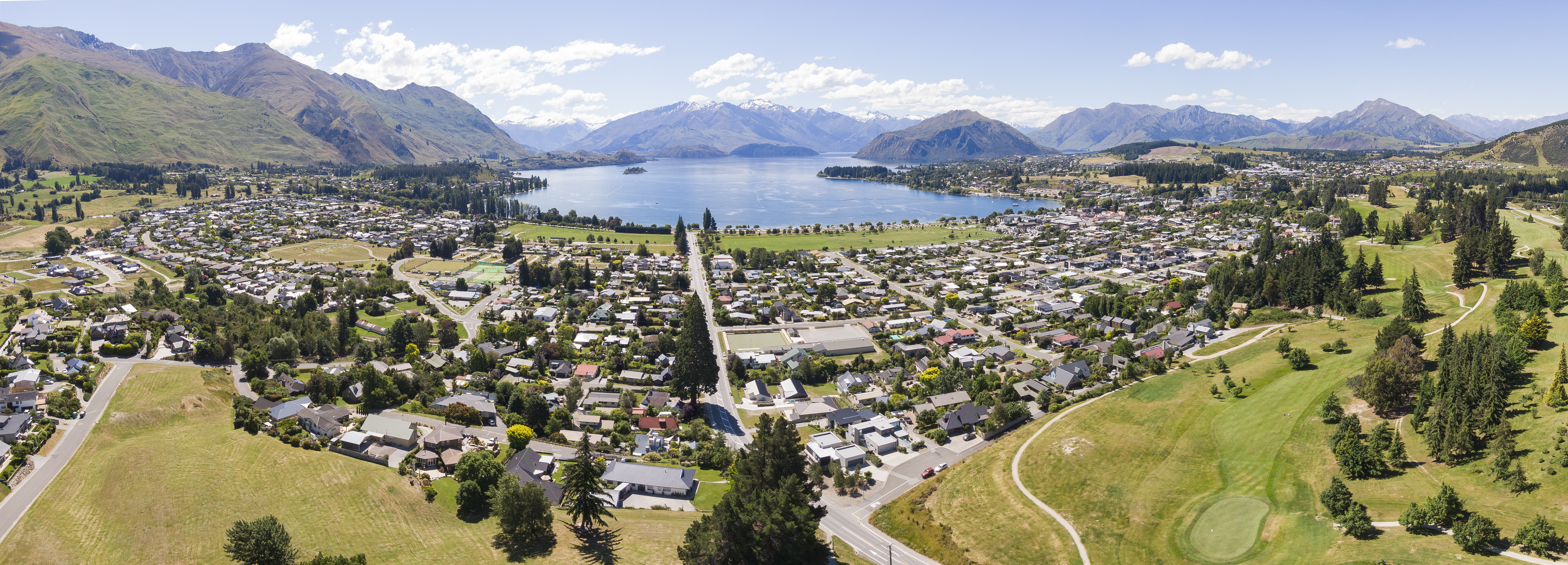
Aerial panorama of the town

- The biennial Warbirds over Wanaka airshow is a major attraction for national and international guests.
- Wanakafest
- NZ Freeski Open
- The biennial New Zealand music Rippon Festival
- Challenge Wanaka Triathlon Festival
- The Festival of Colour is a biennial multi disciplinary arts festival featuring theatre, music, dance and visual arts. Held every second April, it alternates with the ideas festival Aspiring Conversations; both are organised by the Southern Lakes Arts Festival Trust.
- Rhythm & Alps
- The Wānaka agricultural and pastoral show has been held since 1934 at the showgrounds in Wānaka. Thirty to forty thousand people were expected at the 85th edition in March 2022.
- The Wanaka Rodeo is normally held each summer but was forced to cancel the 2022 edition due to "uncertainty around Covid-19 and new regulations".

=== Film locations ===
Films made in the Wānaka region include The Lord of the Rings, The Hobbit, the Legend of S, and A Wrinkle in Time.

=== Summer ===
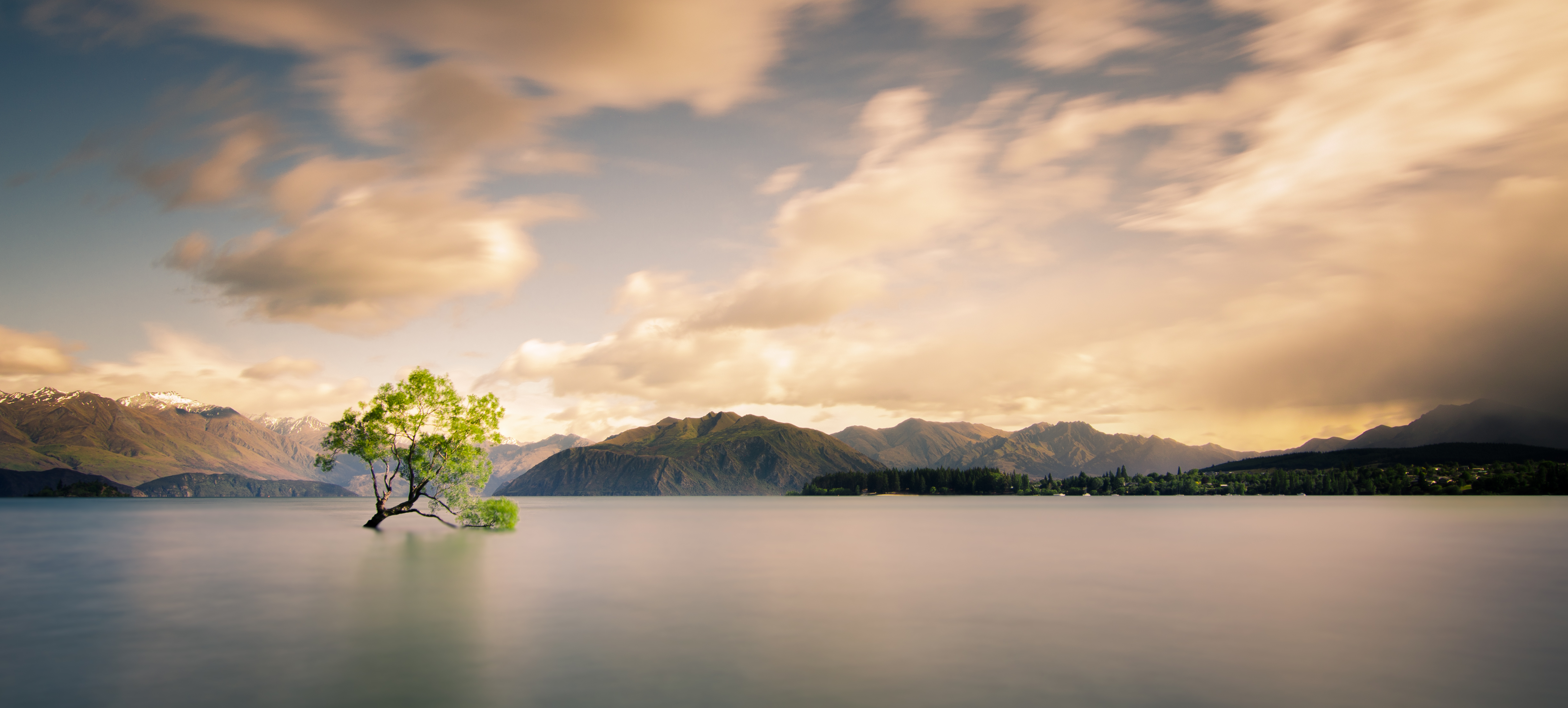
That Wānaka Tree in summer

Wānaka is host to outdoor recreation and tourism activities with hiking, mountain biking, mountaineering, rock climbing, fishing, paragliding, kayaking, rafting, jetboating, and environmental activities. Wānaka has a sunny climate and serves as an access point to the highest New Zealand mountain outside of the Aoraki / Mount Cook region: Mount Aspiring / Tititea.

Mount Aspiring National Park is popular for mountaineering and hiking. Tourists enjoy day trips into the park and many tourists go hiking in the park for up to a week at a time. Parts of the Matukituki Valley on the road to the park are popular for rock climbing, and for day walks.

Lake Wānaka itself is popular for waterskiing, wakeboarding and sailing. This along with the local rivers provide many opportunities for fishing. There is a dedicated mountain biking area made by volunteers in a local pine forest. Adjacent to the bike park is an 18-hole disc golf course. All the local ski resorts are open for mountain biking and hiking in the summer.

=== Winter ===
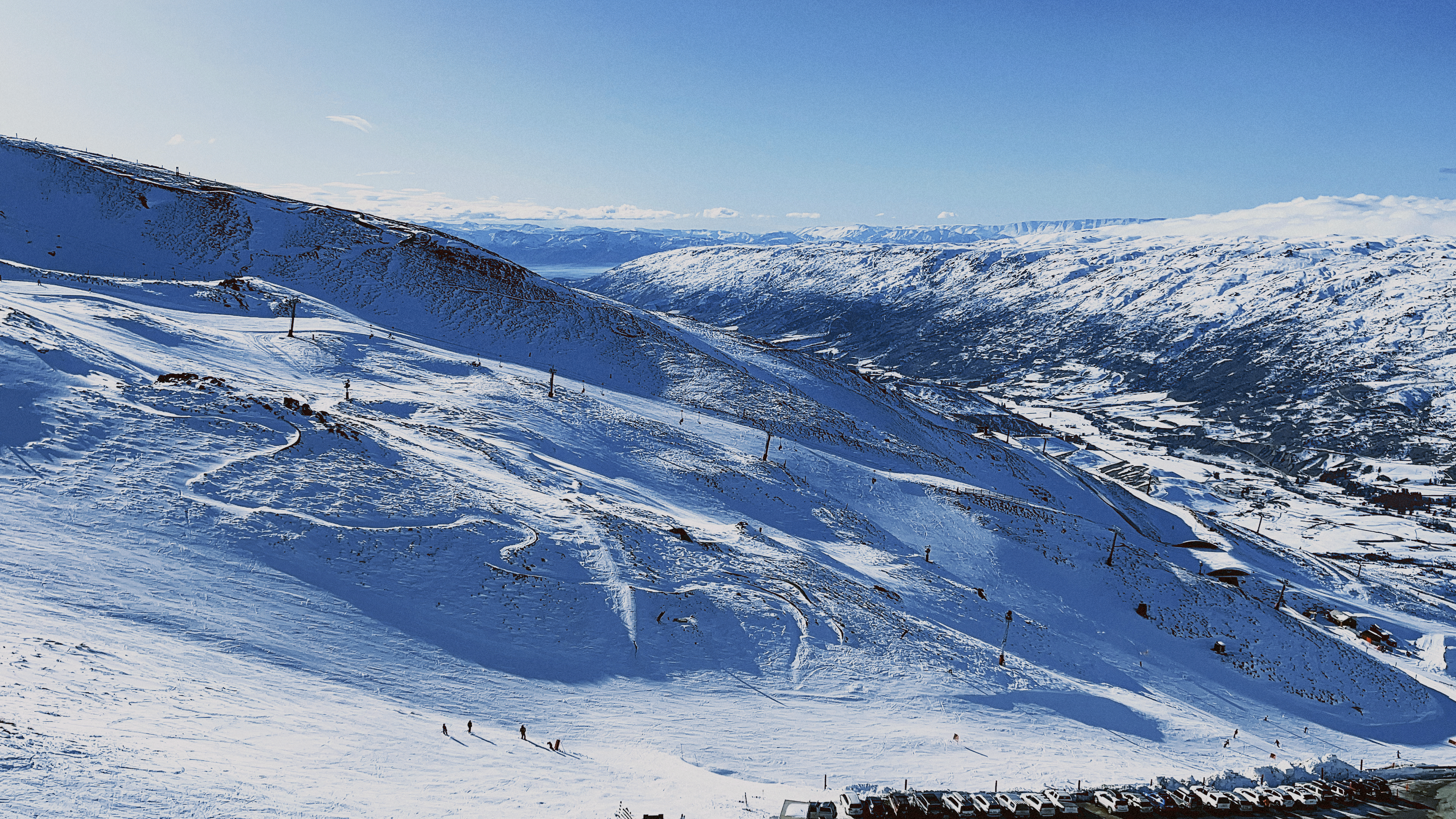
Cardrona Alpine Resort

Wānaka has the broadest range of snow activity choices of any town in New Zealand. These include Treble Cone, Cardrona Alpine Resort and Snow Farm, some of New Zealand's premier commercial ski fields. Wānaka is the main accommodation provider for these resorts and so is very busy in high season (July–September).

Winter in Wānaka is also the home to a variety of winter sporting events including everything from the annual free Winter Games to the Merino Muster.

Treble Cone has good lift-accessed terrain and for this reason has become popular amongst visitors, 'ConeHeads'. It also catches some of the better snow in the area, with its location and orientation getting more snow from NW storms.

Cardrona also hosts one of the few Olympic-sized half-pipes in the world and has been used for practice for Olympic competition.

== Amenities ==
Wānaka amenities

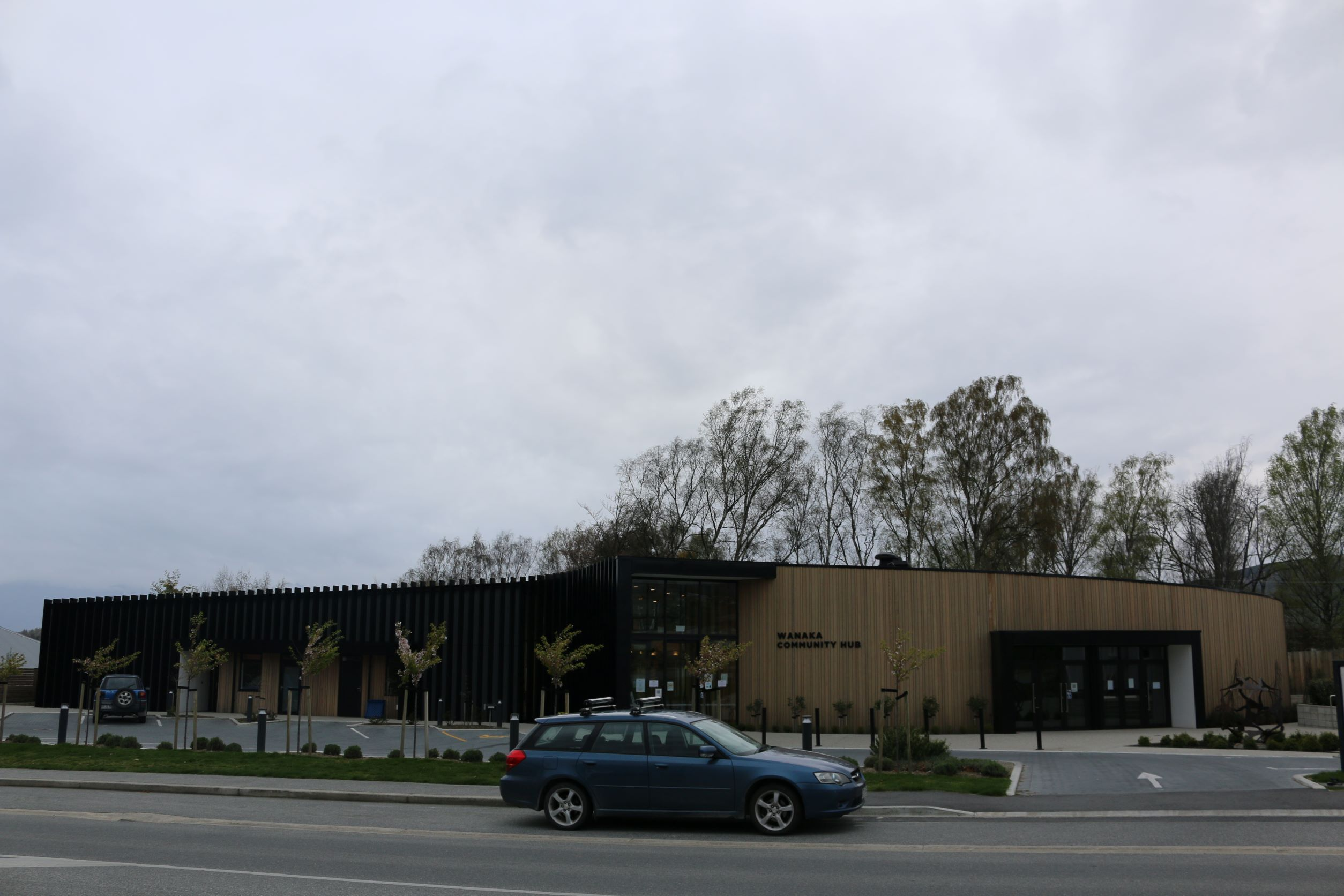
Wānaka Community Hub

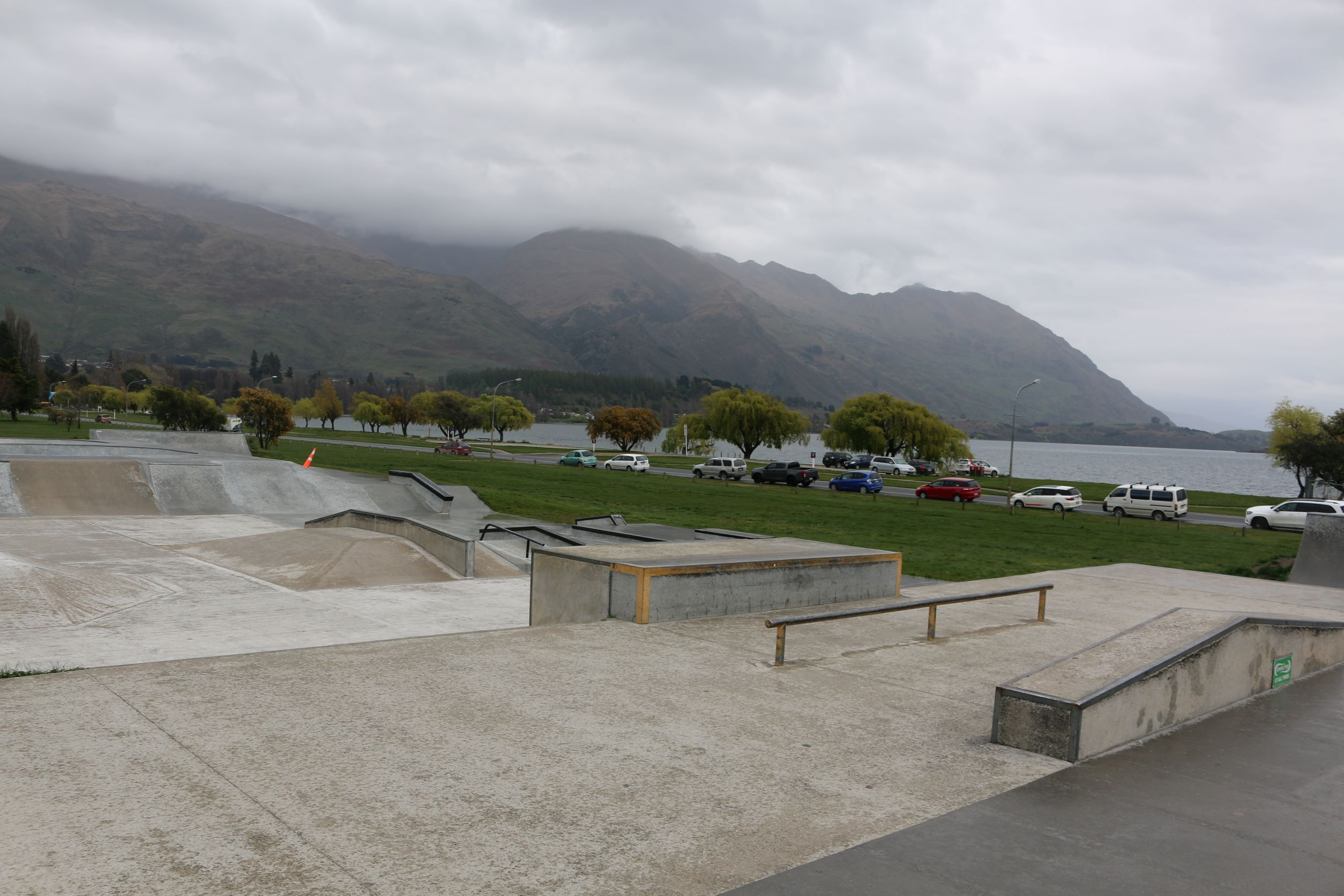
Skateboard park, Pembroke Park

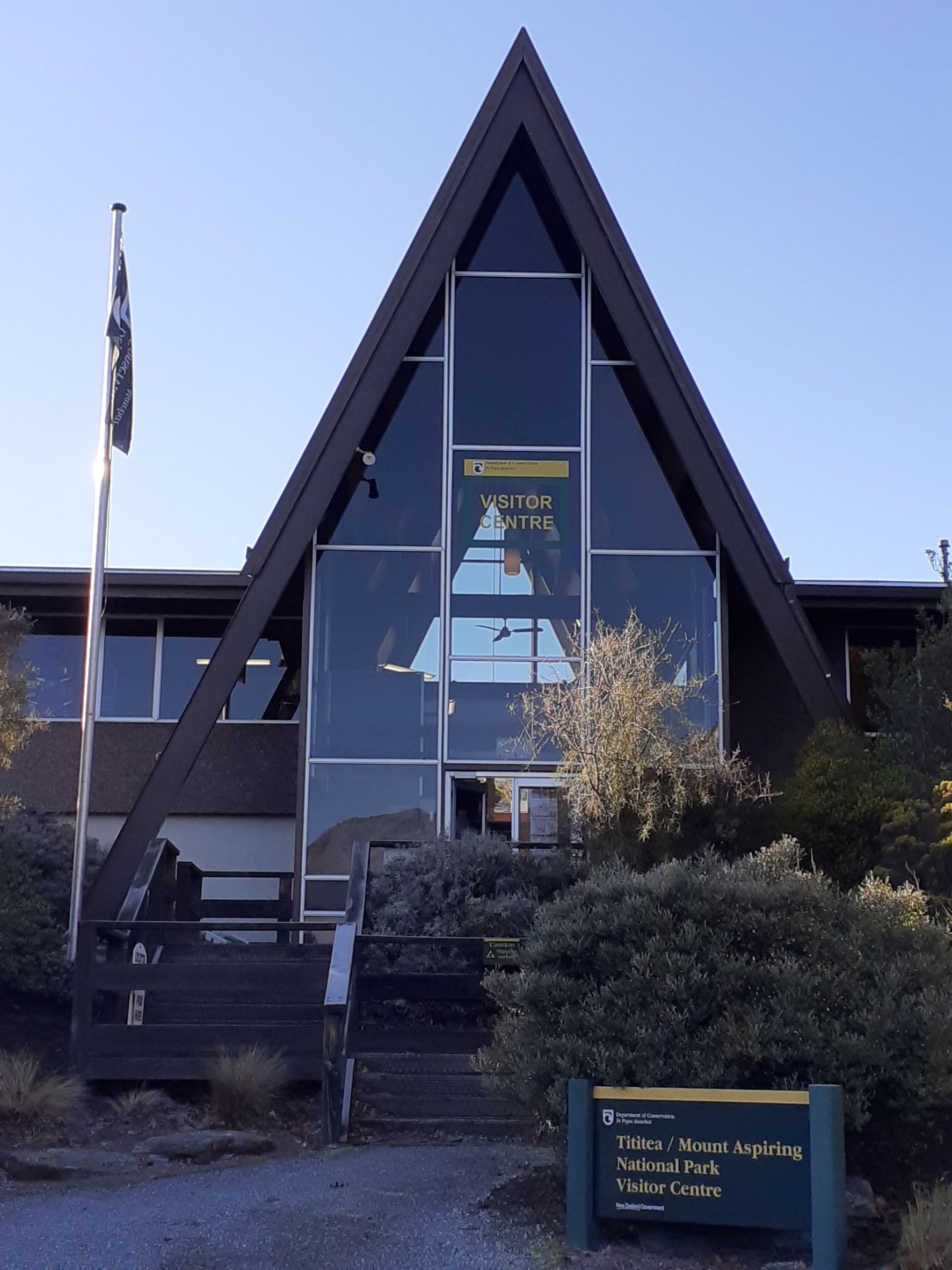
Mt Aspiring visitor centre

=== Swimming pool ===
The Wānaka Recreation Centre has a 25 metre lap pool, a 20 metre learners pool and hot pool for adults. It is located at 41 Sir Tim Wallis Drive. The swimming complex was opened in 2018 and cost $12.8 million.

=== Wānaka Community Hub ===
The Wānaka Community Hub is home to 25 community organisations. The building includes a hall, foyer and offices. The build cost $3.8 million and was opened in October 2021.

=== Library ===
The Wānaka Library is in Dunmore Street. As well as an extensive collection of books and ebooks, audiobooks and newspapers, the library provides Wi-Fi, printing, copying and computer facilities. After issues with freedom campers in 2016, signs in the Wānaka Library ask people not to bathe or wash dishes in the toilets.

=== Golf course ===
The Wānaka golf course, located on Ballantyne Road, was established in 1922. A further nine holes were added to the course in 1967 to make it an 18 hole golf course. The Wanaka Golf Club has around 950 members.

=== Tititea/Mount Aspiring National Park visitor centre ===
The Tititea/Mount Aspiring National Park visitor centre is located on the corner of Ardmore St and Ballentyne Rd. It provides advice about walking and hiking in the national park and information about the huts, campsites, weather and heritage sites. There is also a small museum display of the history, fauna and flora of the national park within the visitor centre.

=== Pembroke Park ===
Pembroke Park covers 10.5 hectares (26 acres) on the foreshore of Lake Wānaka. The majority of the park is grass fields, with a skate park and 136 carparks close to the town centre.

Originally known as "The Commonage", the park was surveyed in 1875 and 1880. A nine-hole golf course was established on the park by 1920, with barbed wire to keep the cows out. From 1940, the New Zealand Electricity Department held the park with the thought that Lake Wānaka might be used for hydro-electricity production. It was designated as a recreational reserve in 1971, managed by Lake County Council, (which later became the Queenstown-Lakes District Council).

The establishment of the parking lot in Pembroke Park in 2000 was controversial, as one of its management objectives is "to preserve in perpetuity Pembroke Park as a recreational area for the enjoyment of the people of Wanaka and visitors".

== Notable buildings ==
Notable buildings

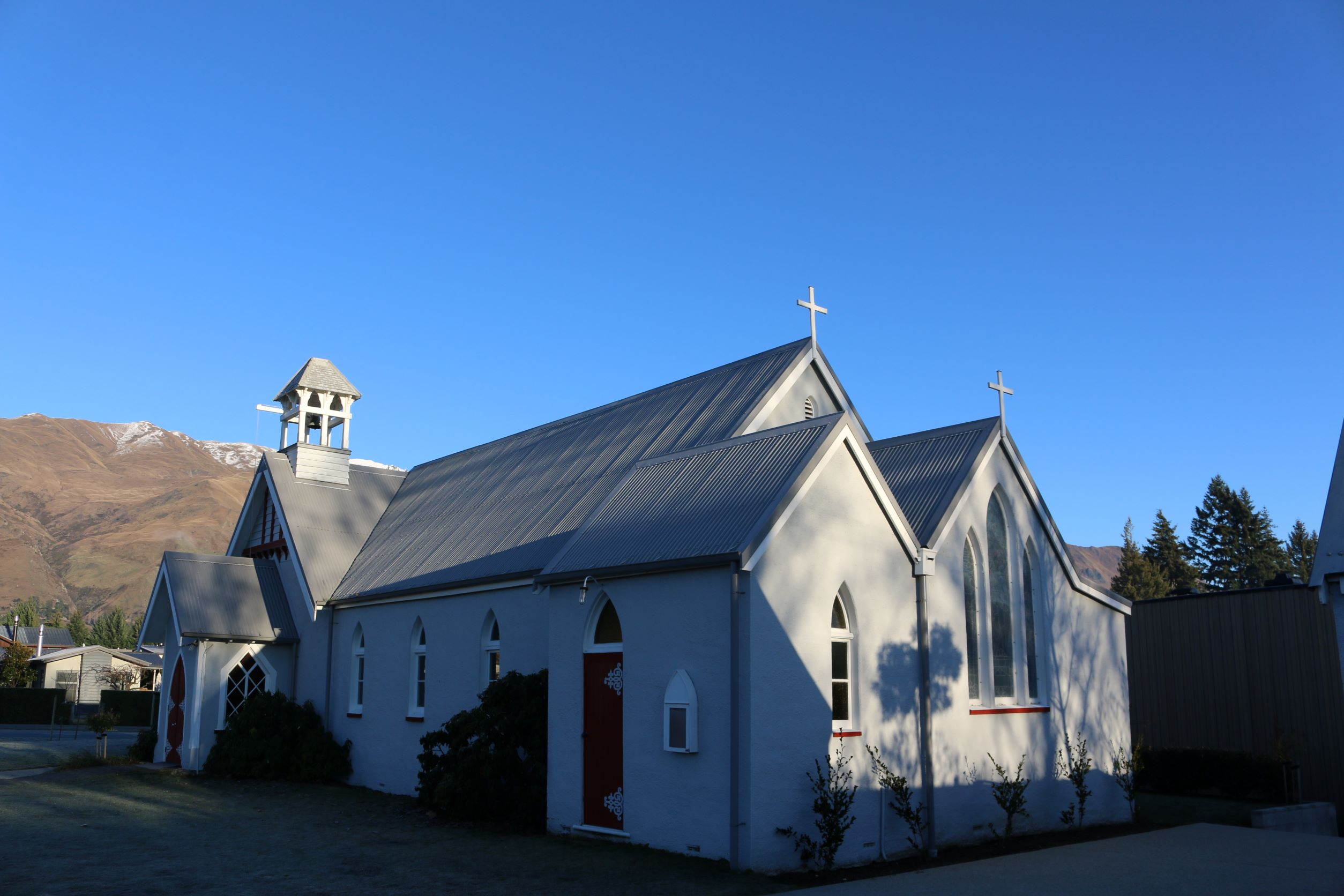
St Columba's Anglican Church

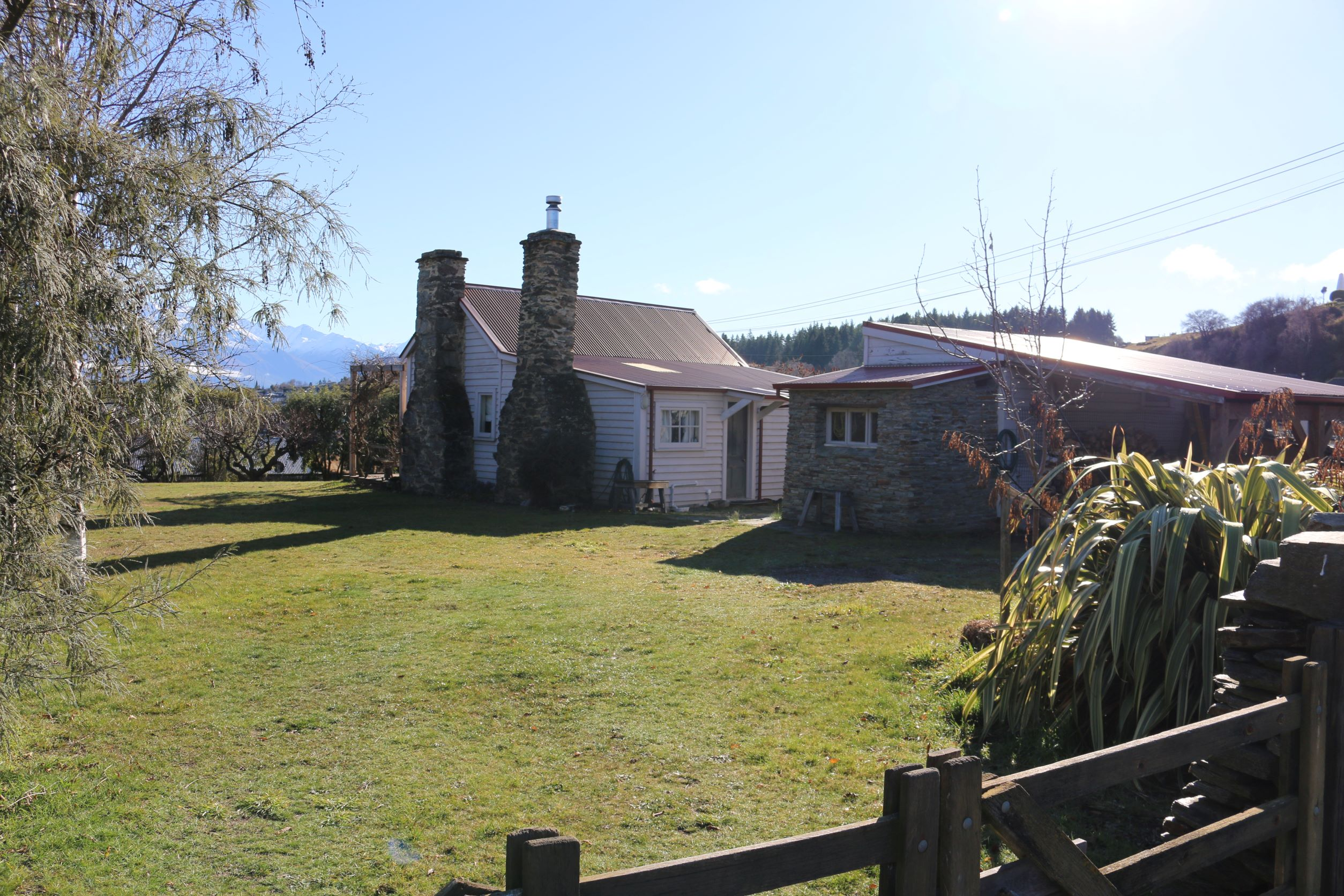
Chalmers' Cottage

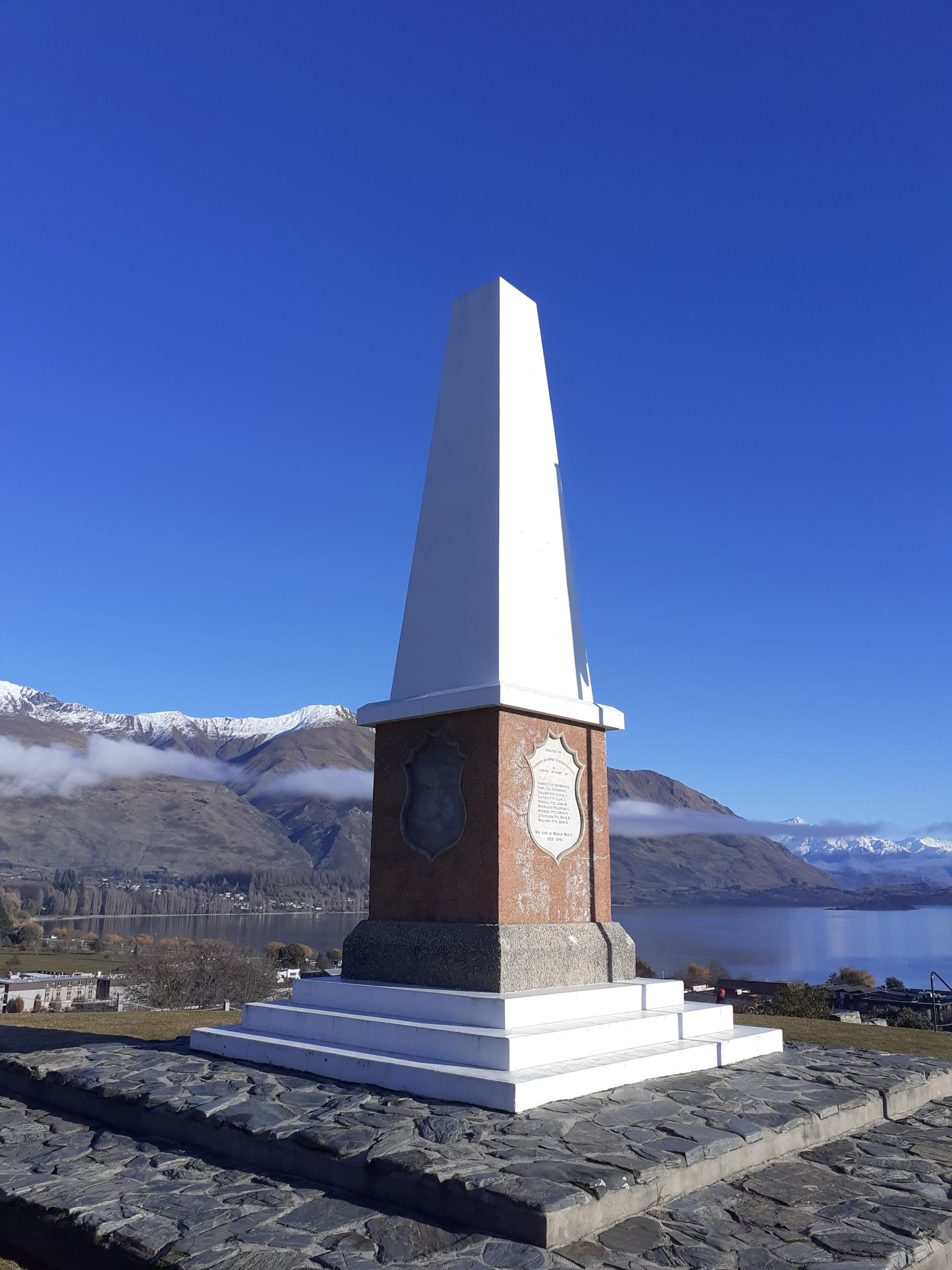
War Memorial

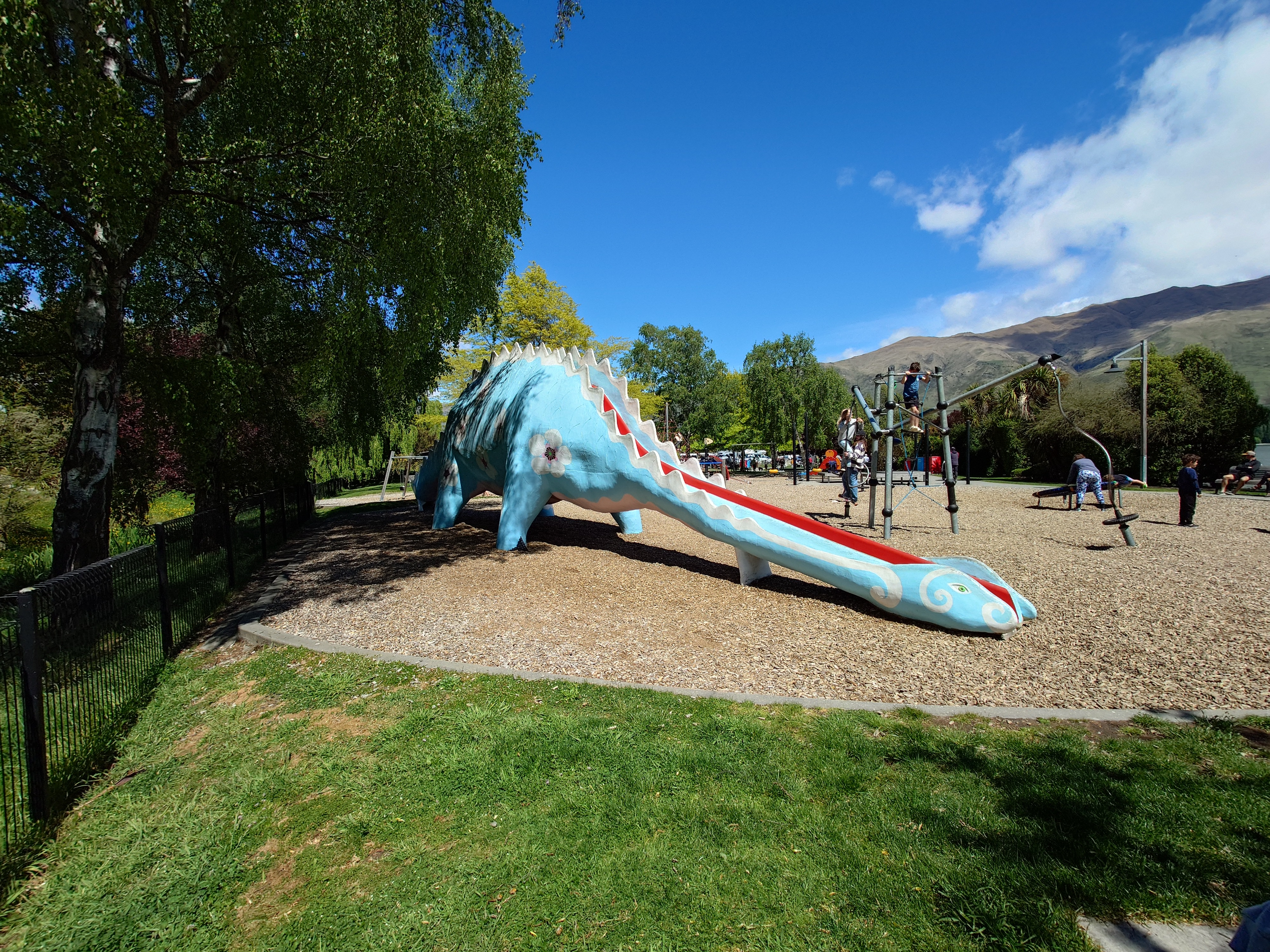
Dinosaur slide

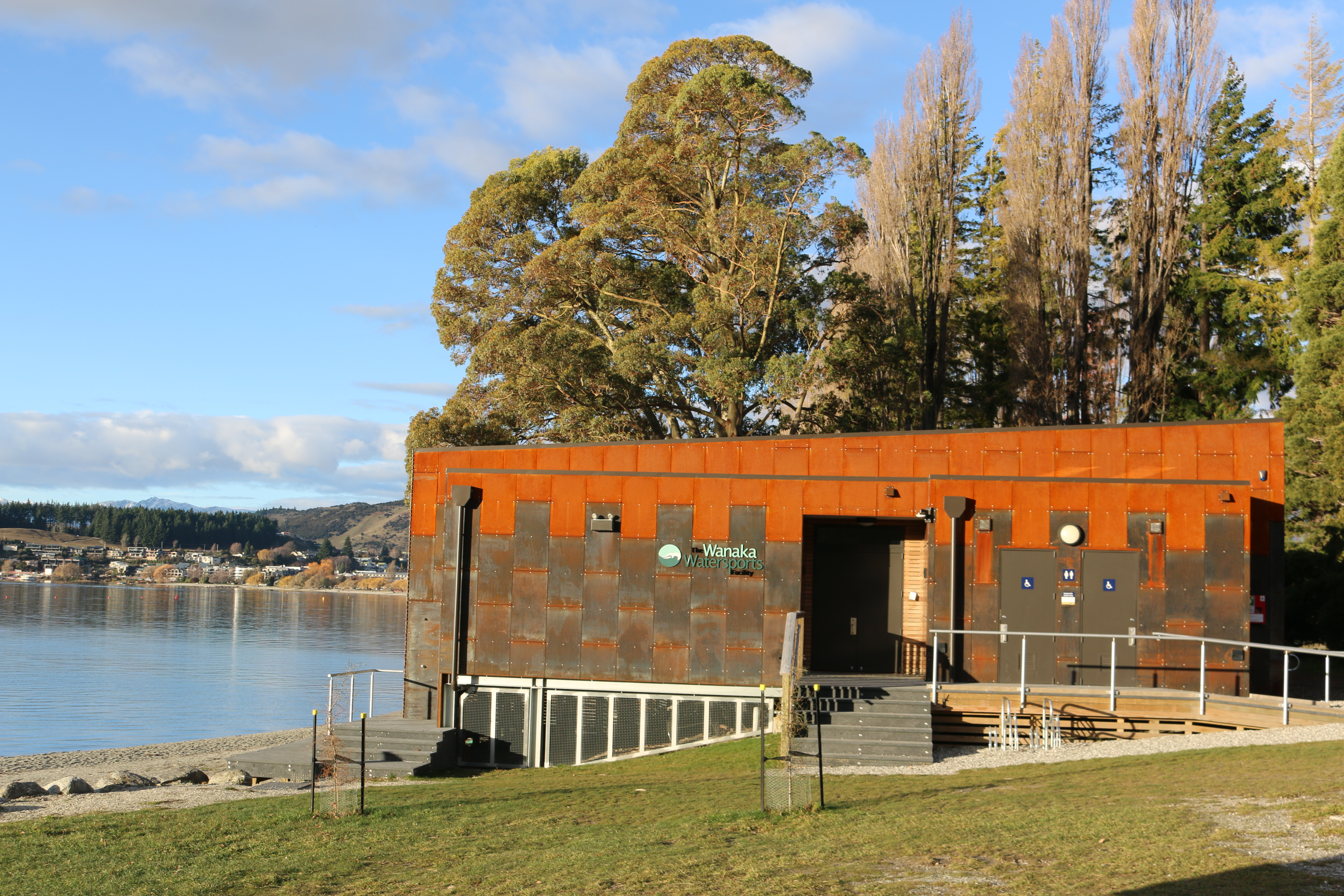
Watersports facility

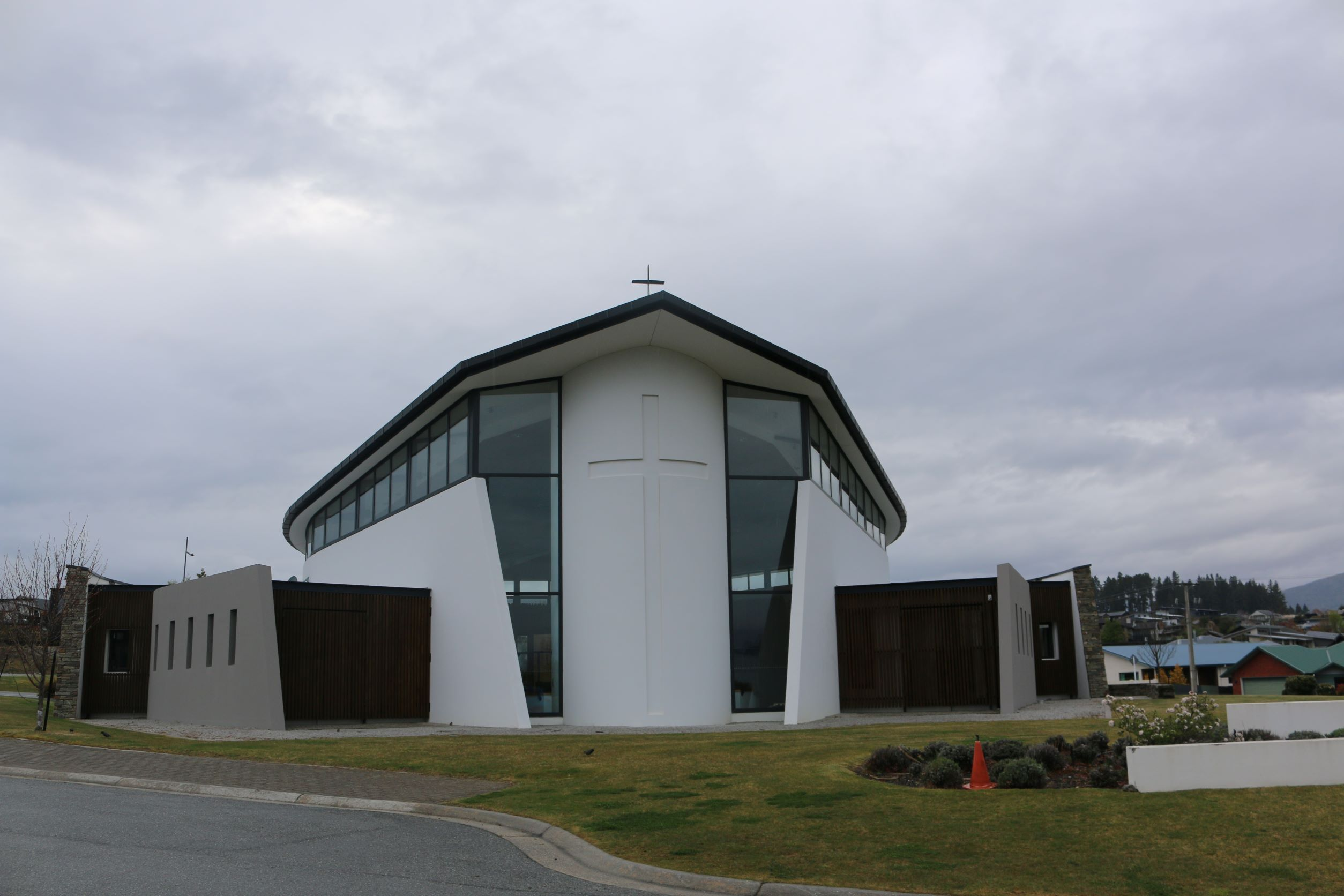
Holy Family Catholic Church

=== Saint Columba's Anglican Church ===
Saint Columba's was built in 1902 and completed in 1911. It is a category 2 historic place.

=== Chalmers' cottage ===
Chalmers' cottage is a grade 2 listed building. It was built in the 1870s for Archibald Chalmers, who was a butcher based in Wānaka.

=== Wānaka War Memorial ===
The Wānaka War Memorial commemorates the twenty seven soldiers from the area that died in World War I and the nine that died in World War II. It is located on Chalmers Street.

=== Dinosaur slide ===
The dinosaur slide built by the Wānaka Jaycees in 1976 is a well known fixture at the lakefront playground in Wānaka.

=== Wānaka watersports facility ===
Described as having a "richly textured and contoured façade [which] belies the tough functional requirements demanded by a project realised in a sensitive environmental zone", the Wānaka watersports facility was the winner of the 2020 Southern Architecture Awards. It is used by the Wānaka Rowing Club Rowing Club, Wanaka Lake Swimmers and TriWanaka. The facility gained resource consent in 2016 despite 744 submitters opposing the build.

=== Holy Family Catholic Church ===
Holy Family Catholic Church was built in 2011 and its organic form was designed to allude to the mountains that surround it. The church replaced the previous church in Brownston Street. It is located next to the Holy Family School.

== Education ==
Wānaka has four schools.

- Holy Family School is a state-integrated Catholic full primary (Year 1–8) school, and has 204 students. The school was established in 2006.
- Mount Aspiring College is a state Year 7–13 secondary school, and has 1,318 students. The school was established in 1986 following the split of Wanaka Area School.
- Wānaka Primary School is a state contributing primary (Year 1–6) school and has 502 students. The school was established in 1986 following the split of Wanaka Area School and relocated to its current site in October 2010.
- Te Kura O Take Kārara is a state contributing primary school, and has 323 students. The schools was established in 2020, providing capacity for more primary school aged children as Wānaka's population grows.

All these schools are coeducational. Rolls are as of July 2026.

== Infrastructure and services ==
=== Transport ===
Wānaka is served by the Wānaka Airport as well as by roads over the Crown Range, through the Haast Pass/Tioripatea to the West Coast, to Mount Cook Village via the Lindis Pass to the north, and south through Cromwell by State Highway 6.

There are daily bus services to Christchurch, Dunedin, Queenstown and Greymouth.

During the late 19th century, unsuccessful Bills were introduced to Parliament to enable the extension of the Otago Central Railway from its terminus at Taieri Lake to Wānaka and Lake Hāwea. The proposal to extend the railway, which had since already been extended to Cromwell, was again unsuccessfully revived in the early 20th century. The main reason for NZR's reluctance was having to cross the Clutha River twice. A more direct route to Hāwea was planned but dropped due to cost.

=== Utilities ===
Aurora Energy operates the electricity distribution network in and around Wānaka. Electricity is fed from Transpower's national grid at Cromwell to Wānaka via twin 66,000-volt lines.

Fresh water for the town is drawn from Lake Wānaka via two inlets and treated by chlorination prior to distribution. Since 2008, the water supply has had issues with Didymo "rock snot" algae entering the system and building up, clogging filters and household plumbing. The Queenstown-Lakes District Council planned to add protozoal treatment to the water supply in 2024.

=== Commerce ===
Resource consent was approved for a film studio development in 2021. The film studio was expected to cost $280 million and was to include up to 10 sound stages, an 11 hectare lake, an Italian village and replicas of parts of Venice, Paris and New York City.

$4m of government funding was withdrawn when the project failed to meet agreed milestones, and as of 27 May 2024, the project appears unlikely to go ahead.

== Notable people ==
- Robert McDougall — Known as "the father of Pembroke", McDougall served as postmaster; registrar of births, deaths, and marriages; and justice of the peace. McDougall became one of the first councillors upon formation of the Lake County Council and retained his seat for 37 years. McDougall also served as chairman of the Wanaka Islands Domain Board and donated land for the first school in Wanaka.
- Nico Porteous – New Zealand's youngest Olympic medallist
- Zoi Sadowski-Synnott – New Zealand's first Winter Olympics gold medallist
- Peter Thiel – entrepreneur, owns a 193-hectare estate to the north of the Wānaka township.
- Josh Timu – Rugby player
- Tim Wallis – A pilot and businessman, started Warbirds over Wanaka, and has a street named after him in the town: Sir Tim Wallis Drive.
