= Crown Range =

Mountain range in New Zealand

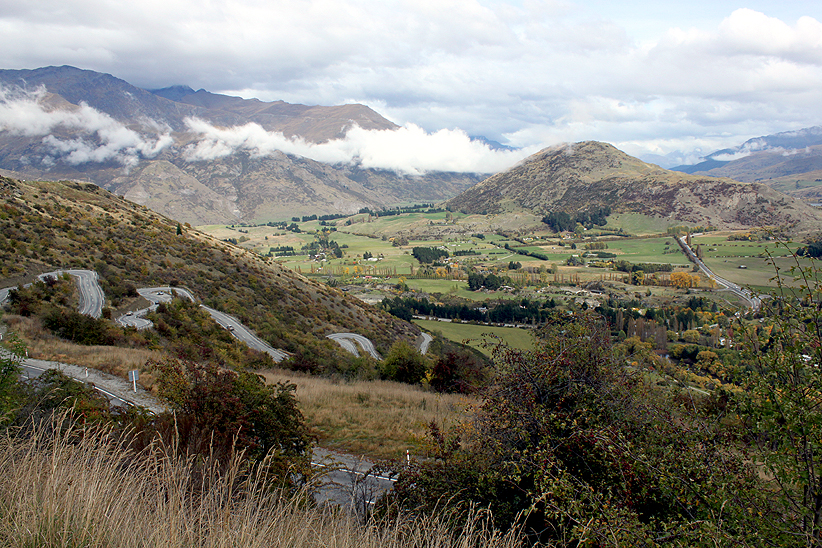
- The Zig Zag climbing the Crown Range road near Arrowtown

Geography
- Country: New Zealand
- Region: Otago
- District: Queenstown-Lakes District
- Range coordinates: 44°56′S 168°55′E

The Crown Range is a mountain range that lies to the east of the Wakatipu Basin in Otago, New Zealand. It is noted for two features, the Cardrona Alpine Resort, on the slopes of the 1900-metre Mount Cardrona, and a highway, known as the Crown Range Road.

Eastburn Station has provided a number of viewing areas, with views down and over Lake Hayes, Arrowtown and Queenstown Airport to Queenstown.

The range is separated by the valley of the Cardrona River from the parallel Criffel Range which lies to the east.

The area was heavily populated during the Otago gold rush of the 1860s, the town of Cardrona, now little more than a dot on the map, briefly having a population of several thousand prospectors. There are visible remains of gold prospecting beside the Crown Range Road over the saddle on the west bank opposite the East Burn Stream two miles over the saddle, also six miles below the saddle on the east bank.
