= Glendhu Bay =

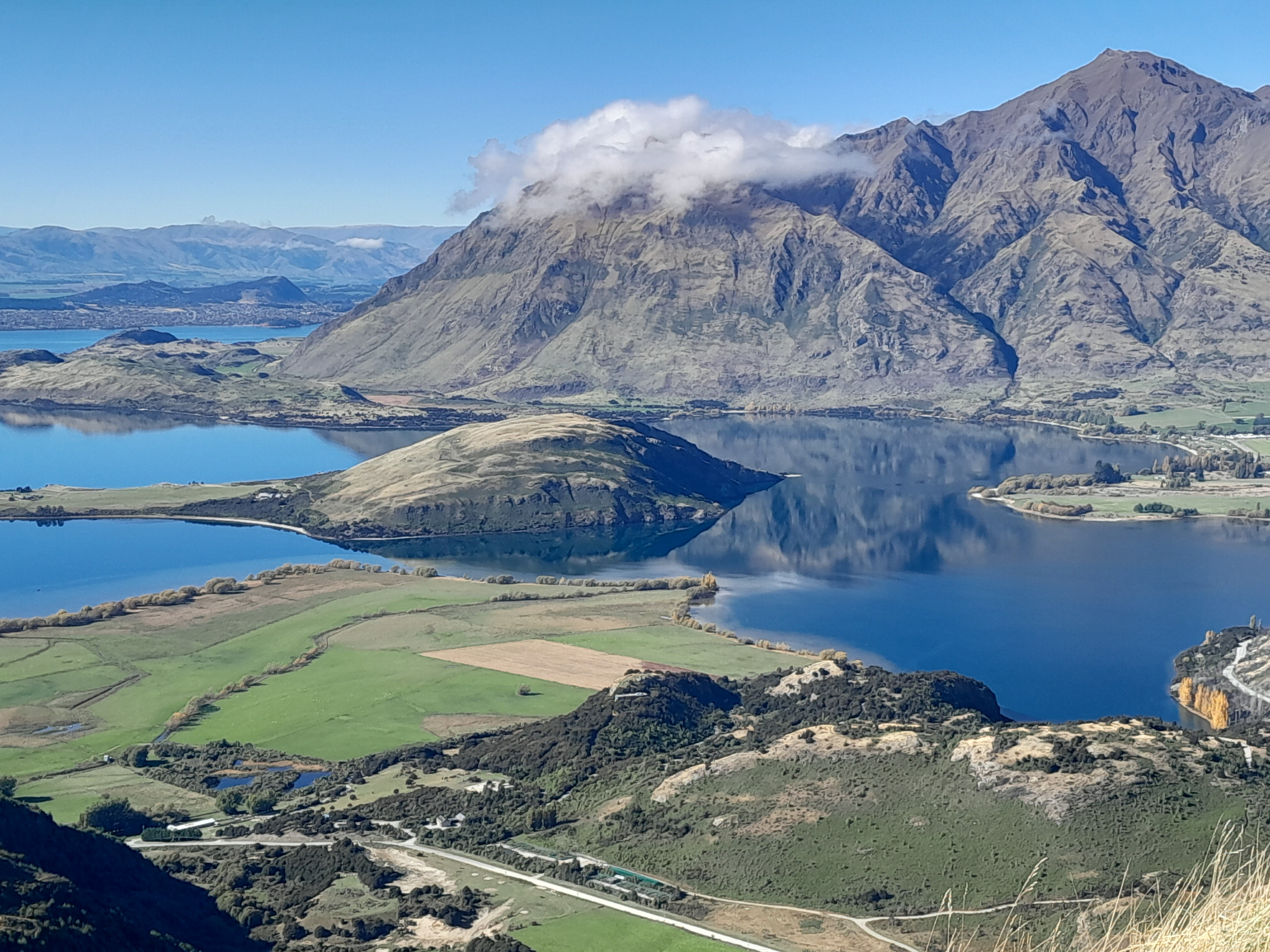
- View of the settlement

- Location within New Zealand
- Coordinates: 44°40′38.64″S 169°0′48.6″E

Glendhu Bay is a small settlement near Wānaka in Otago, New Zealand. The bay has a motor camp, and is a short drive west from Wānaka, on the road to Treble Cone skifield and Mount Aspiring National Park.
