= Cardrona River =

River in the South Island of New Zealand

Cardrona River Ōrau
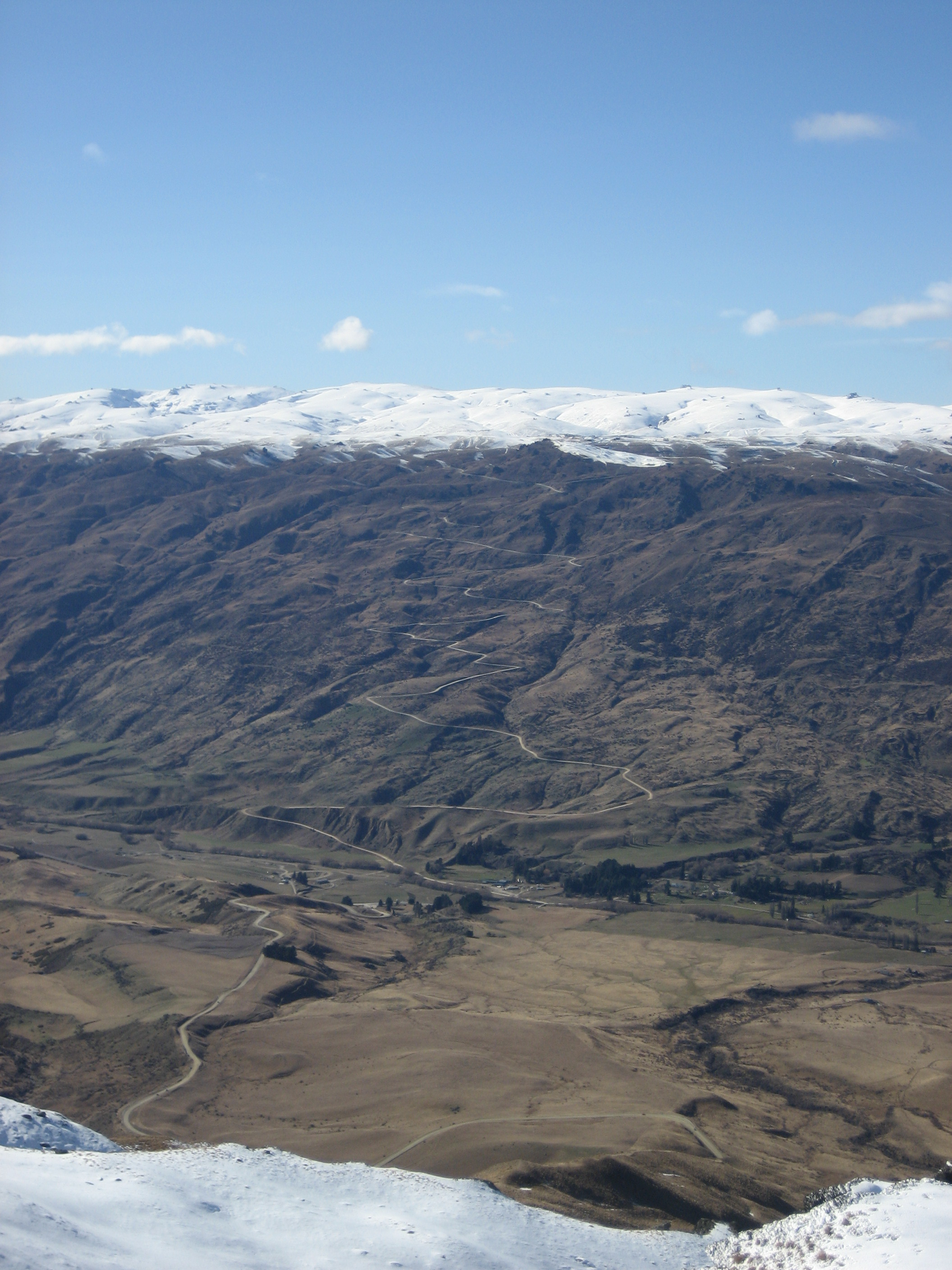
- View of Cardrona Valley of the Cardrona River
- Native name: Ōrau (Māori)

Location
- Country: New Zealand
- Region: Otago
- Settlements: Wānaka, Cardrona

Physical characteristics
- Source: Crown Range
- Mouth: Clutha / Mata-au River
  - coordinates: 44°41′S 169°12′E
- Length: 40 km (25 mi)

Basin features
- Progression: → Clutha River → Pacific Ocean

The Cardrona River is in Otago in the South Island of New Zealand. It is one of the first tributaries of the Clutha River / Mata-Au, which it meets only 5 kilometres (3 mi) from the latter's origin at the outflow of Lake Wānaka.

== Geography ==
The Cardrona flows north for 40 kilometres (25 mi) down the steep narrow Cardrona Valley. Its headwaters are near New Zealand's highest main road, the Crown Range Road. The valley separates the Crown Range to the west from the Criffel Range to the east. The river runs past the settlement of Cardona and the Cardrona skifield, then south of Wānaka township.

== Etymology ==
The Māori name of the river is Ōrau, meaning 'place of leaves'. Robert Wilkin, an early settler, named the river after the Cardrona River in Scotland.

== History ==
In 1863 the river was prospected for gold. Significant amounts were found in the following years but a flood in 1878 covered up most of the claims and prospecting in the area died down.

In 2017, a toxic cyanobacteria phormidium was found in the river after a period of warm temperatures. The public were warned that people and dogs should avoid contact with the water while the algae was present. The Cardrona River is one of several rivers in the Otago region that are known as vulnerable to outbreaks of cyanobacteria.

An environmental DNA analysis in 2023 revealed a previously unknown population of galaxid fish are present in the Cardrona River. The species identified is the Clutha flathead galaxid, which is critically threatened and close to extinction.

In 2024, a group of 50 volunteers removed around 1,000 kg (2,200 lb) of rubbish from a section of the river. Further cleanups were planned for other sections of the river.
