= Sergeants Hill =

- Interactive map of Sergeants Hill
- Coordinates: 41°45′46″S 171°39′7″E
- Country: New Zealand
- Region: West Coast
- District: Buller District
- Electorates: West Coast-Tasman; Te Tai Tonga

Population (2023)
  - Total: 477

Sergeants Hill is a lightly populated locality in the West Coast region of New Zealand's South Island. It is situated in a rural setting on the eastern outskirts of Westport in the Buller District.

State Highway 67 and a branch line of the Stillwater - Westport railway both pass through Sergeants Hill. The railway is part of the first line built in the Buller District; it opened on 31 December 1875 and linked Westport with Fairdown. The line subsequently grew into the Seddonville Branch and was opened through to the Seddonville terminus on 23 February 1895. Passenger services through Sergeants Hill, which were always mixed trains, were cancelled from 14 October 1946, and on 3 May 1981, the line was closed beyond Ngakawau. Its sole traffic is now coal exported via the port of Lyttelton.

== Demographics ==
Sergeants Hill locality covers 35.83 km^{2} (13.83 sq mi). It is part of the larger Westport Rural statistical area.

Historical population
Year	Pop.	±% p.a.
2006	339	—
2013	423	+3.21%
2018	426	+0.14%
2023	477	+2.29%

Sergeants Hill had a population of 477 in the 2023 New Zealand census, an increase of 51 people (12.0%) since the 2018 census, and an increase of 54 people (12.8%) since the 2013 census. There were 243 males, 234 females, and 3 people of other genders in 192 dwellings. 3.8% of people identified as LGBTIQ+. There were 75 people (15.7%) aged under 15 years, 54 (11.3%) aged 15 to 29, 234 (49.1%) aged 30 to 64, and 114 (23.9%) aged 65 or older.

People could identify as more than one ethnicity. The results were 93.7% European (Pākehā); 8.2% Māori; 0.6% Pasifika; 0.6% Asian; 1.3% Middle Eastern, Latin American and African New Zealanders (MELAA); and 3.1% other, which includes people giving their ethnicity as "New Zealander". English was spoken by 98.7%, Māori by 1.3%, and other languages by 5.0%. No language could be spoken by 1.3% (e.g. too young to talk). The percentage of people born overseas was 10.7, compared with 28.8% nationally.

Religious affiliations were 28.9% Christian and 0.6% Jewish. People who answered that they had no religion were 60.4%, and 8.2% of people did not answer the census question.

Of those at least 15 years old, 66 (16.4%) people had a bachelor's or higher degree, 237 (59.0%) had a post-high school certificate or diploma, and 99 (24.6%) people exclusively held high school qualifications. 42 people (10.4%) earned over $100,000 compared to 12.1% nationally. The employment status of those at least 15 was 189 (47.0%) full-time, 75 (18.7%) part-time, and 9 (2.2%) unemployed.
