= Summerlea, New Zealand =

Summerlea
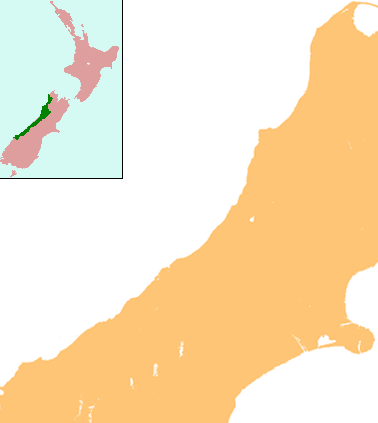
- Coordinates: 41°31′49″S 171°56′32″E
- Country: New Zealand
- Region: West Coast
- District: Buller District
- Electorates: West Coast-Tasman; Te Tai Tonga

Summerlea is a lightly populated locality on the West Coast of New Zealand's South Island.

Summerlea is on the Tasman Sea coastline with the Glasgow Range to the east. To the north of the town is the neighbouring settlement of Mokihinui and the rivermouth of the Mōkihinui River. State Highway 67 passes through the locality. It is included in the Mokihinui statistical area by Statistics New Zealand, and according to the 2013 New Zealand census, Mokihinui has a population of 186, an increase of 15 people since the 2006 census.

In the early 1890s, a branch line railway was opened from Westport through Summerlea, opening to Seddonville on 23 February 1895 and thus acquiring the name of the Seddonville Branch. Passenger services were provided to Summerlea by mixed trains until 14 October 1946, when the line became freight-only. Coal was almost the sole traffic on the line from this point, and when coal mining activity declined in the 1970s, the line's maintenance costs came to outweigh revenue. Accordingly, the line closed beyond Ngakawau on 3 May 1981, and much of the line's formation can still be seen passing through the countryside around Summerlea.

Demographics for the area are covered at Mokihinui.
