= Waimangaroa =

Town on the West Coast of the South Island of New Zealand

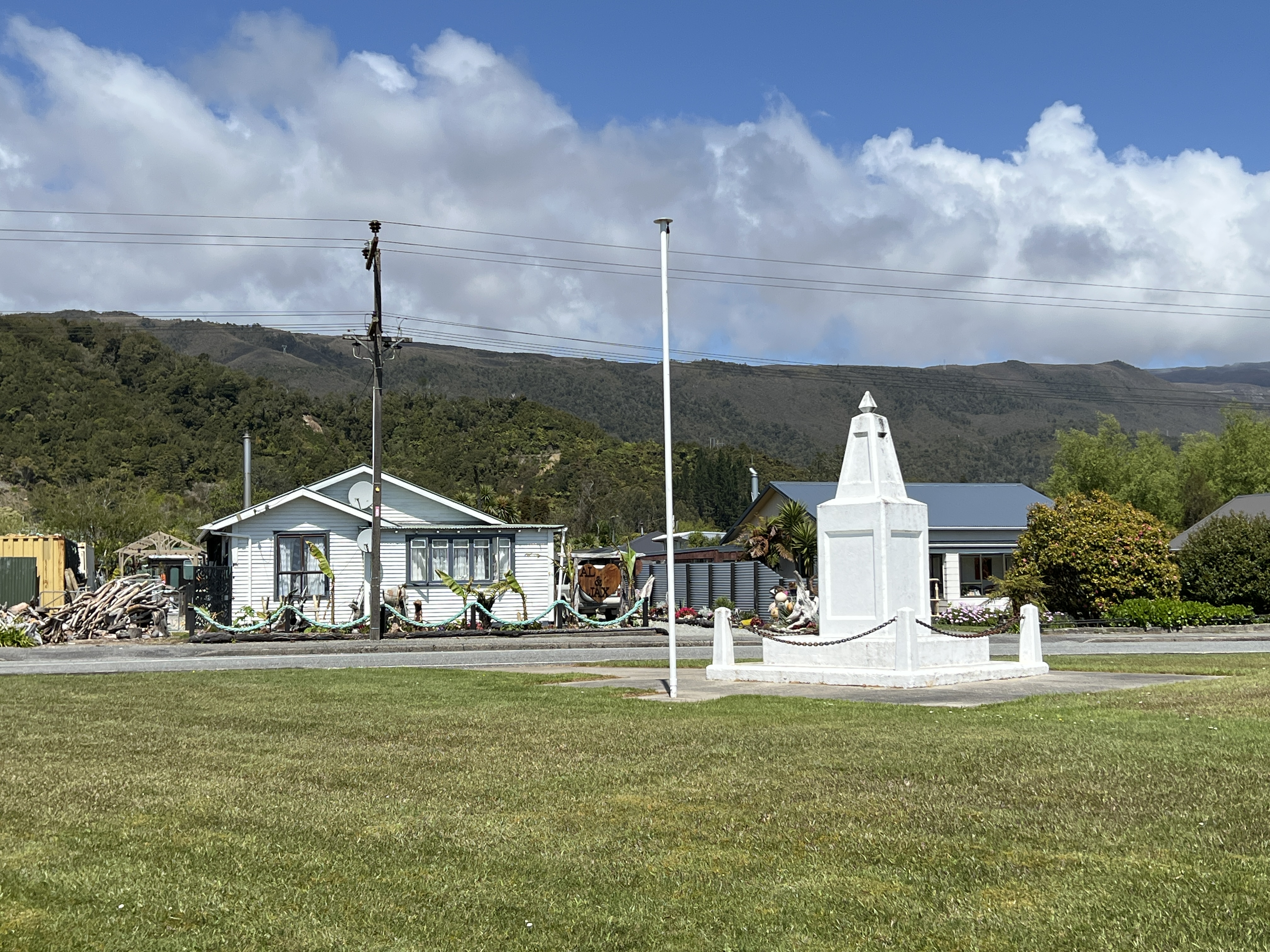
- Denniston Road Scenic Reserve
- Interactive map of Waimangaroa
- Coordinates: 41°42′46″S 171°45′46″E
- Country: New Zealand
- Region: West Coast
- District: Buller District
- Ward: Seddon
- Electorates: West Coast-Tasman; Te Tai Tonga

Government
  - Territorial Authority: Buller District Council
  - Regional council: West Coast Regional Council
  - Mayor of Buller: Chris Russell
  - West Coast-Tasman MP: Maureen Pugh
  - Te Tai Tonga MP: Tākuta Ferris

Area
  - Total: 1.58 km^{2} (0.61 sq mi)

Population (June 2025)
  - Total: 210
  - Density: 130/km^{2} (340/sq mi)

Waimangaroa is a small town located on the West Coast of New Zealand.

The township lies on the south-west bank of the Waimangaroa River, at the western foot of the Denniston Plateau. It is 17 kilometres (11 mi) to the north east of Westport and 13 km south-east of Granity. The abandoned coaltown of Denniston is about 5 kilometres (3.1 mi) to the south-east. The Bridle Track, a scenic bush track, leads south-east along the Denniston Incline into the foothills of the Mt William Range, to Denniston. The Stockton mine, a large open cast coal mine, is operated in the vicinity by Solid Energy.

The Ngakawau Branch, a branch line railway, runs through the town. It opened to Waimangaroa on 5 August 1876; it formerly ran to Seddonville but now terminates in Ngakawau. From 24 October 1879 until 16 August 1967, Waimangaroa was also the junction for the Conns Creek Branch, which ran east alongside the Waimangaroa River to the foot of the Denniston Incline. Passenger services ceased on the Conns Creek Branch in 1931 and Ngakawau Branch on 14 October 1946. Since this time, the railway through Waimangaroa has almost solely conveyed coal.

The beaches to the west have dangerous currents and are not safe for swimming.

== Demographics ==
Waimangaroa is described by Stats NZ as a rural settlement and covers 1.58 km^{2} (0.61 sq mi). It had an estimated population of 210 as of June 2025, with a population density of 133 people per km^{2}. It is part of the larger Buller Coalfields statistical area.

Historical population
Year	Pop.	±% p.a.
2006	225	—
2013	249	+1.46%
2018	231	−1.49%
2023	222	−0.79%

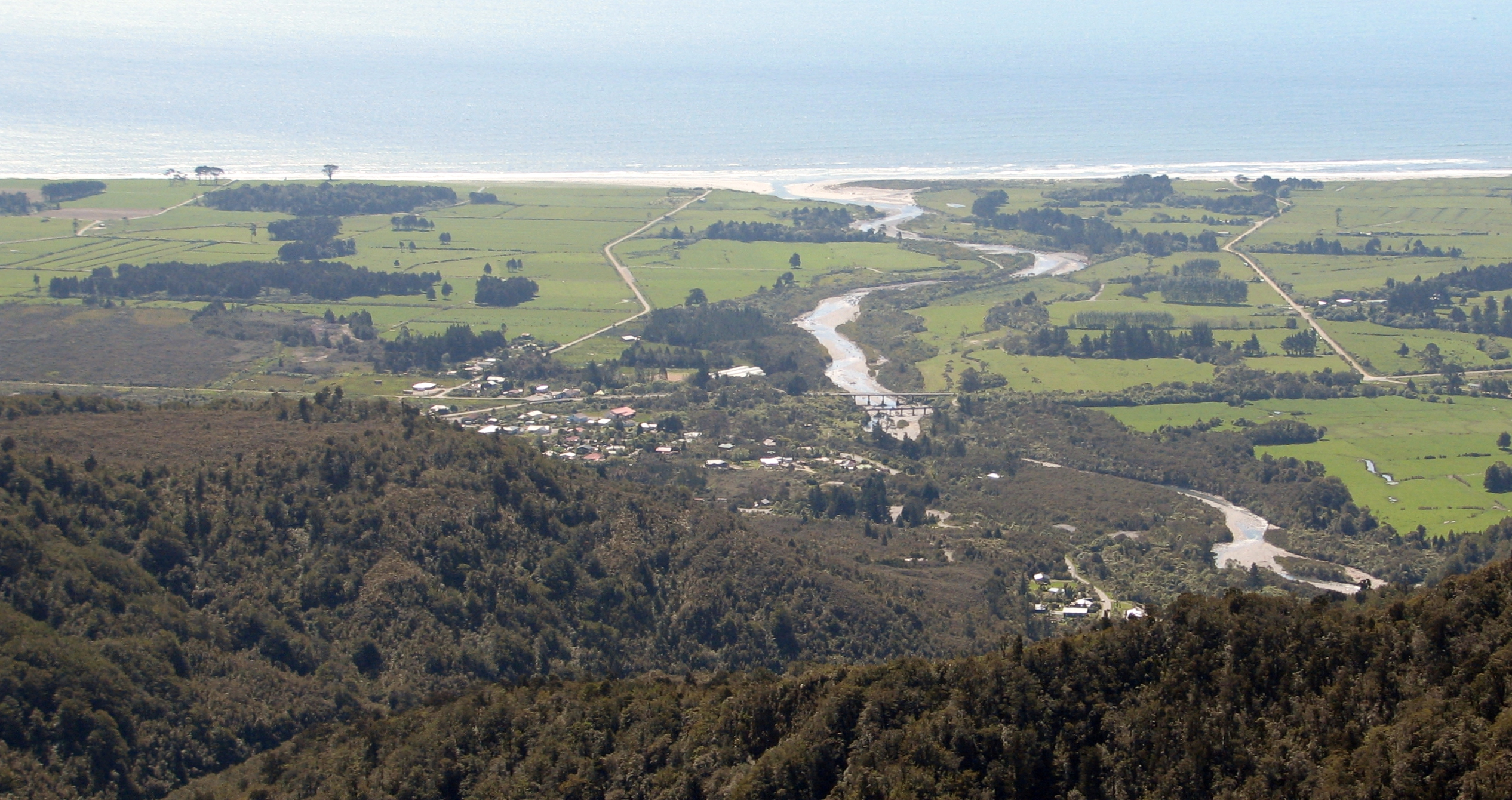
Waimangaroa viewed from the Denniston road

Waimangaroa had a population of 222 in the 2023 New Zealand census, a decrease of 9 people (−3.9%) since the 2018 census, and a decrease of 27 people (−10.8%) since the 2013 census. There were 123 males and 99 females in 108 dwellings. The median age was 57.4 years (compared with 38.1 years nationally). There were 18 people (8.1%) aged under 15 years, 27 (12.2%) aged 15 to 29, 114 (51.4%) aged 30 to 64, and 63 (28.4%) aged 65 or older.

People could identify as more than one ethnicity. The results were 89.2% European (Pākehā); 12.2% Māori; 1.4% Pasifika; 1.4% Middle Eastern, Latin American and African New Zealanders (MELAA); and 5.4% other, which includes people giving their ethnicity as "New Zealander". English was spoken by 100.0%, Māori by 2.7%, and other languages by 4.1%. The percentage of people born overseas was 12.2, compared with 28.8% nationally.

Religious affiliations were 17.6% Christian. People who answered that they had no religion were 70.3%, and 9.5% of people did not answer the census question.

Of those at least 15 years old, 15 (7.4%) people had a bachelor's or higher degree, 123 (60.3%) had a post-high school certificate or diploma, and 66 (32.4%) people exclusively held high school qualifications. The median income was $26,100, compared with $41,500 nationally. 6 people (2.9%) earned over $100,000 compared to 12.1% nationally. The employment status of those at least 15 was 69 (33.8%) full-time, 27 (13.2%) part-time, and 3 (1.5%) unemployed.

== Education ==
Waimangaroa School was a coeducational full primary school (years 1-8). The school opened in 1879 and celebrated its 125th jubilee in 2004. It closed permanently in 2012, with most of its students transferring to Granity School.

== Notable people ==
- Becky Manawatu (born 1982), writer
