= Granity =

Town on the West Coast of the South Island of New Zealand

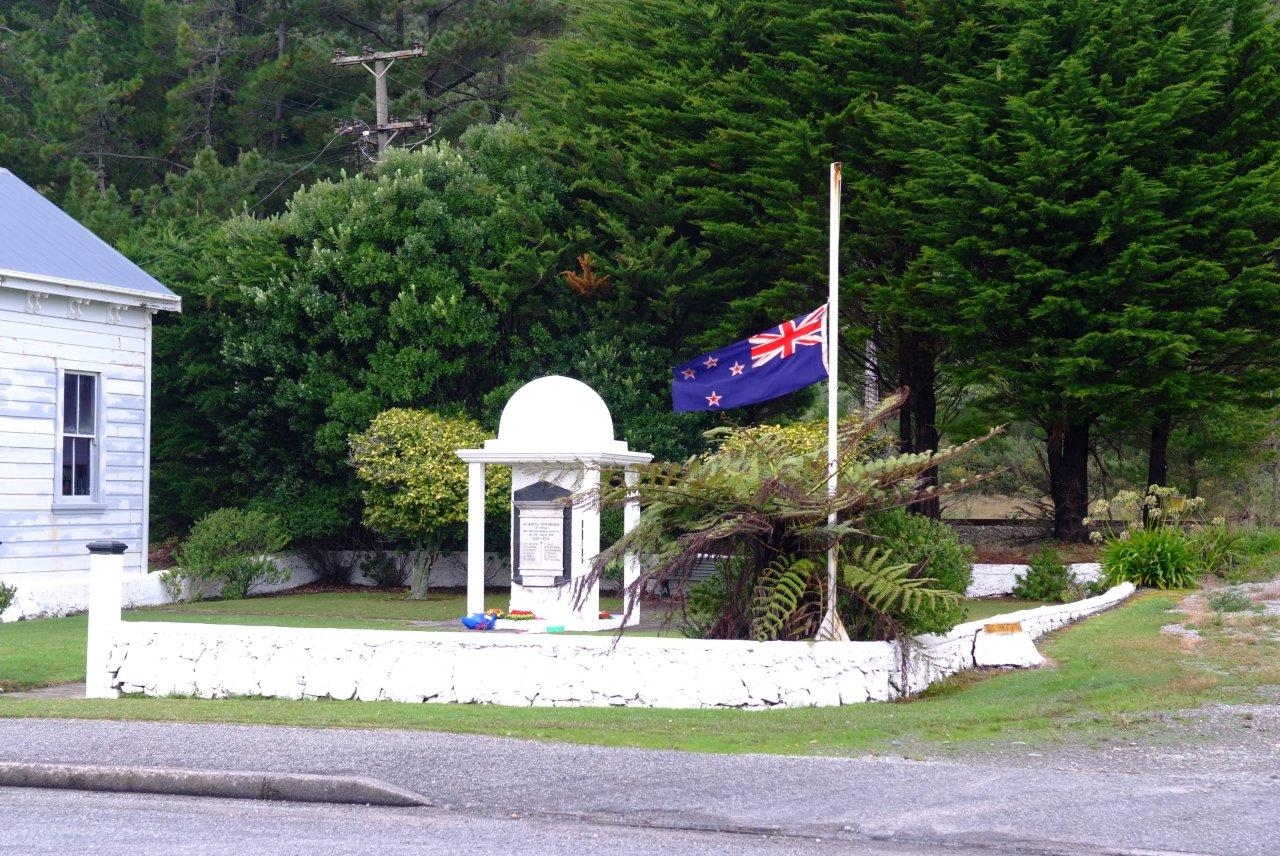
- Granity War Memorial
- Interactive map of Granity
- Coordinates: 41°37′47″S 171°51′13″E
- Country: New Zealand
- Region: West Coast
- District: Buller District
- Ward: Seddon
- Electorates: West Coast-Tasman; Te Tai Tonga

Government
  - Territorial authority: Buller District Council
  - Regional council: West Coast Regional Council
  - Mayor of Buller: Chris Russell
  - West Coast-Tasman MP: Katie Milne
  - Te Tai Tonga MP: Mananui Ramsden

Area
  - Total: 2.36 km^{2} (0.91 sq mi)

Population (June 2025)
  - Total: 190
  - Density: 81/km^{2} (210/sq mi)

Granity is a small town on the West Coast of New Zealand's South Island, 28 kilometres (17 mi) north-east of Westport on State Highway 67. Karamea is 68 kilometres (42 mi) further north.

The town is on a narrow strip of land between the Tasman Sea to the west and steep, mountains to the immediate east. Long known as a coal-mining town, the population declined as the industry waned. The population was 190 in June 2025. Several neighbouring towns, such as Denniston, have become virtually ghost towns. In 1911 Granity's population was 589, 641 in 1921 and 547 in 1956. Granity had a railway station on the Westport-Ngākawau Line from 28 Feb 1892 until 16 May 1982, though closed to passengers from 14 October 1946. In 1902 it had a staff of 5.

The name "Granity" was given to the town by gold prospectors, in reference to the large quantity of granite in the area.

== Demographics ==
Granity is described by Stats NZ as a rural settlement which covers 2.36 km^{2} (0.91 sq mi). It had an estimated population of 190 as of June 2025, with a population density of 81 people per km^{2}. It is part of the larger Buller Coalfields statistical area.

Historical population for Granity
| Year | Pop. | ±% p.a. |
|---|---|---|
| 2006 | 189 | — |
| 2013 | 213 | +1.72% |
| 2018 | 180 | −3.31% |
| 2023 | 192 | +1.30% |
The 2006 population is for a smaller area of 1.95 km^{2}. Source:

Granity had a population of 192 in the 2023 New Zealand census, an increase of 12 people (6.7%) since the 2018 census, and a decrease of 21 people (−9.9%) since the 2013 census. There were 108 males and 87 females in 105 dwellings. 3.1% of people identified as LGBTIQ+. The median age was 58.5 years (compared with 38.1 years nationally). There were 21 people (10.9%) aged under 15 years, 18 (9.4%) aged 15 to 29, 99 (51.6%) aged 30 to 64, and 60 (31.2%) aged 65 or older.

People could identify as more than one ethnicity. The results were 92.2% European (Pākehā), 12.5% Māori, 1.6% Pasifika, and 6.2% other, which includes people giving their ethnicity as "New Zealander". English was spoken by 100.0%, Māori by 1.6%, and other languages by 1.6%. The percentage of people born overseas was 10.9, compared with 28.8% nationally.

Religious affiliations were 20.3% Christian, 3.1% New Age, and 1.6% other religions. People who answered that they had no religion were 60.9%, and 14.1% of people did not answer the census question.

Of those at least 15 years old, 15 (8.8%) people had a bachelor's or higher degree, 99 (57.9%) had a post-high school certificate or diploma, and 63 (36.8%) people exclusively held high school qualifications. The median income was $24,300, compared with $41,500 nationally. 3 people (1.8%) earned over $100,000 compared to 12.1% nationally. The employment status of those at least 15 was 48 (28.1%) full-time, 24 (14.0%) part-time, and 9 (5.3%) unemployed.

=== Buller Coalfields statistical area ===
Buller Coalfields statistical area, which also includes Hector and Ngakawau, Waimangaroa, Denniston, Millerton and Stockton, New Zealand, covers 498.52 km^{2} (192.48 sq mi). It had an estimated population of 960 as of June 2025, with a population density of 1.9 people per km^{2}.

Historical population for Buller Coalfields
| Year | Pop. | ±% p.a. |
|---|---|---|
| 2006 | 939 | — |
| 2013 | 987 | +0.71% |
| 2018 | 909 | −1.63% |
| 2023 | 963 | +1.16% |

Buller Coalfields had a population of 963 in the 2023 New Zealand census, an increase of 54 people (5.9%) since the 2018 census, and a decrease of 24 people (−2.4%) since the 2013 census. There were 504 males, 453 females, and 3 people of other genders in 495 dwellings. 3.1% of people identified as LGBTIQ+. The median age was 58.1 years (compared with 38.1 years nationally). There were 105 people (10.9%) aged under 15 years, 84 (8.7%) aged 15 to 29, 501 (52.0%) aged 30 to 64, and 273 (28.3%) aged 65 or older.

People could identify as more than one ethnicity. The results were 91.3% European (Pākehā); 13.1% Māori; 1.6% Pasifika; 2.2% Asian; 0.3% Middle Eastern, Latin American and African New Zealanders (MELAA); and 5.6% other, which includes people giving their ethnicity as "New Zealander". English was spoken by 99.1%, Māori by 2.2%, and other languages by 3.7%. No language could be spoken by 0.6% (e.g. too young to talk). The percentage of people born overseas was 12.8, compared with 28.8% nationally.

Religious affiliations were 20.9% Christian, 0.3% Māori religious beliefs, 1.6% New Age, and 1.9% other religions. People who answered that they had no religion were 63.6%, and 11.5% of people did not answer the census question.

Of those at least 15 years old, 87 (10.1%) people had a bachelor's or higher degree, 459 (53.5%) had a post-high school certificate or diploma, and 312 (36.4%) people exclusively held high school qualifications. The median income was $25,900, compared with $41,500 nationally. 36 people (4.2%) earned over $100,000 compared to 12.1% nationally. The employment status of those at least 15 was 297 (34.6%) full-time, 108 (12.6%) part-time, and 27 (3.1%) unemployed.

== Economy ==
The Granity Creek Sawmill was established in 1846 and was a significant employer in the area. The town was also the location of the engineering division of the Westport Coal Company, and the railway station was used for loading and dispatching coal from the nearby Millerton mine.

== Education ==
Granity School is a co-educational full primary school (years 1–8), with a roll of 30 as of July 2026. The natural erosion of the beach, at a rate of 40 centimetres (16 in) per year, is threatening the school buildings, and a stopbank has resulted in the school grounds protruding further out onto the beach than adjoining properties.

The school opened in 1880 in Ngakawau and was later re-located to a site between Ngakawau and Granity. In 1901 it had a roll of 100 pupils. By 1925, it was Granity District High School. It moved to a new site and buildings in 1939.

A school was moved from Coal Creek, Mokihinui about 1905 to Seddonville to become Seddonville School. It closed in 1981 with the students moving to Granity School.

Waimangaroa School opened in 1879 and closed in 2012, with most of its students transferring to Granity School.

== Biodiversity ==
The very rare and critically endangered cobble skink is only known to occur on a short stretch of pebbled coast at Granity.

== Notable people ==
Notable people from Granity include:

- Bub Bridger, writer and performer

== Gallery ==
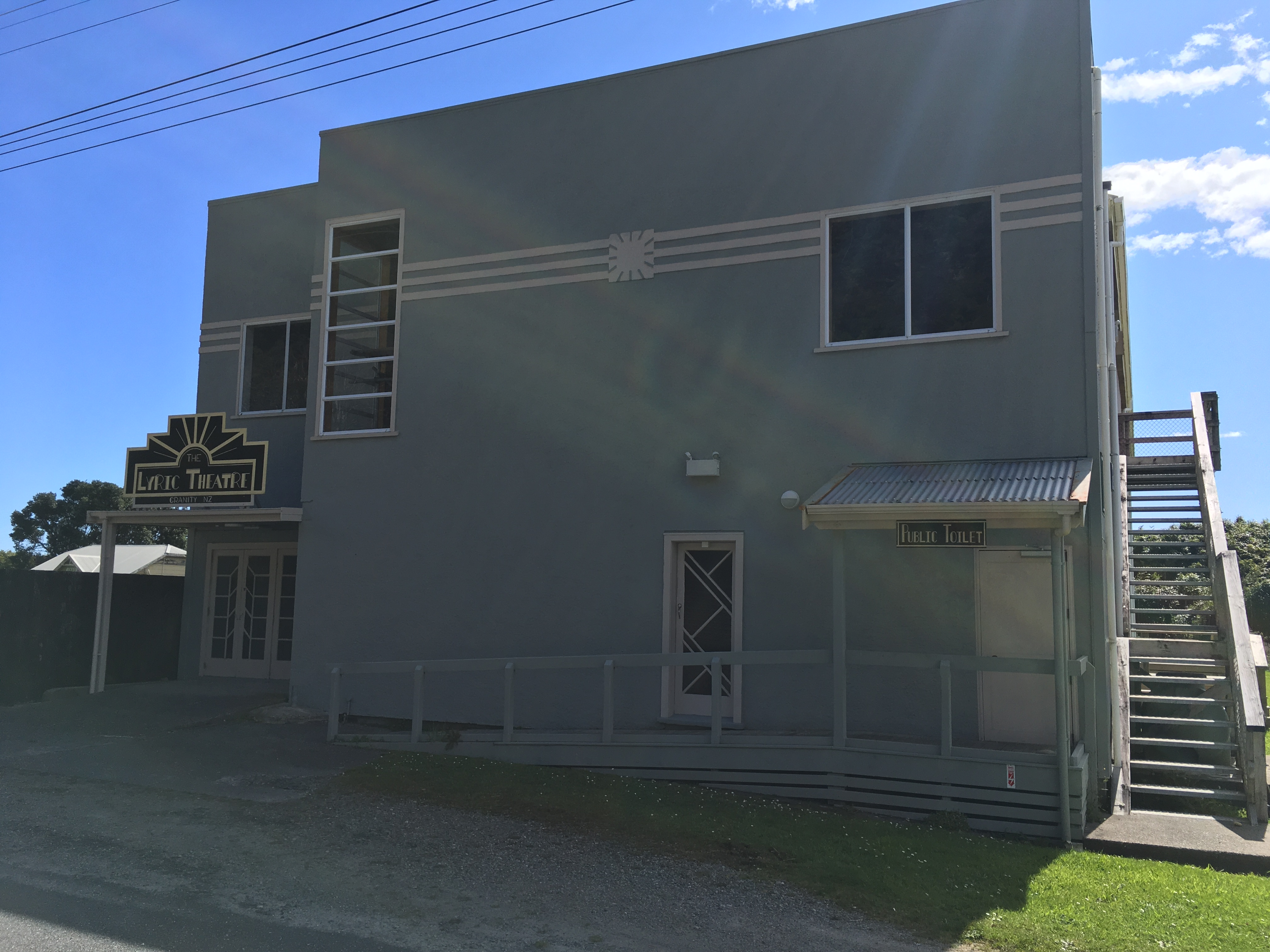
The Lyric Theatre

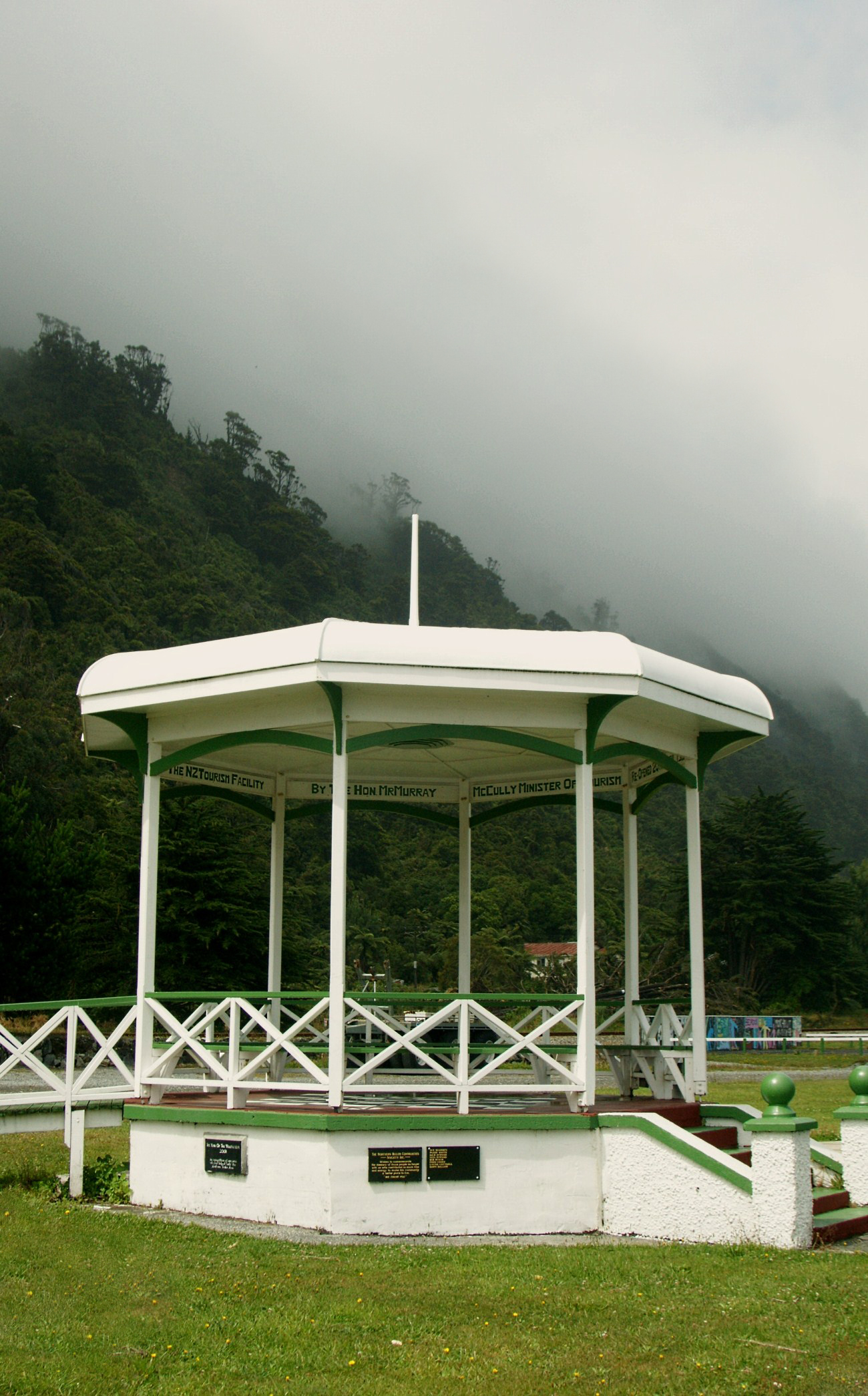
Band rotunda

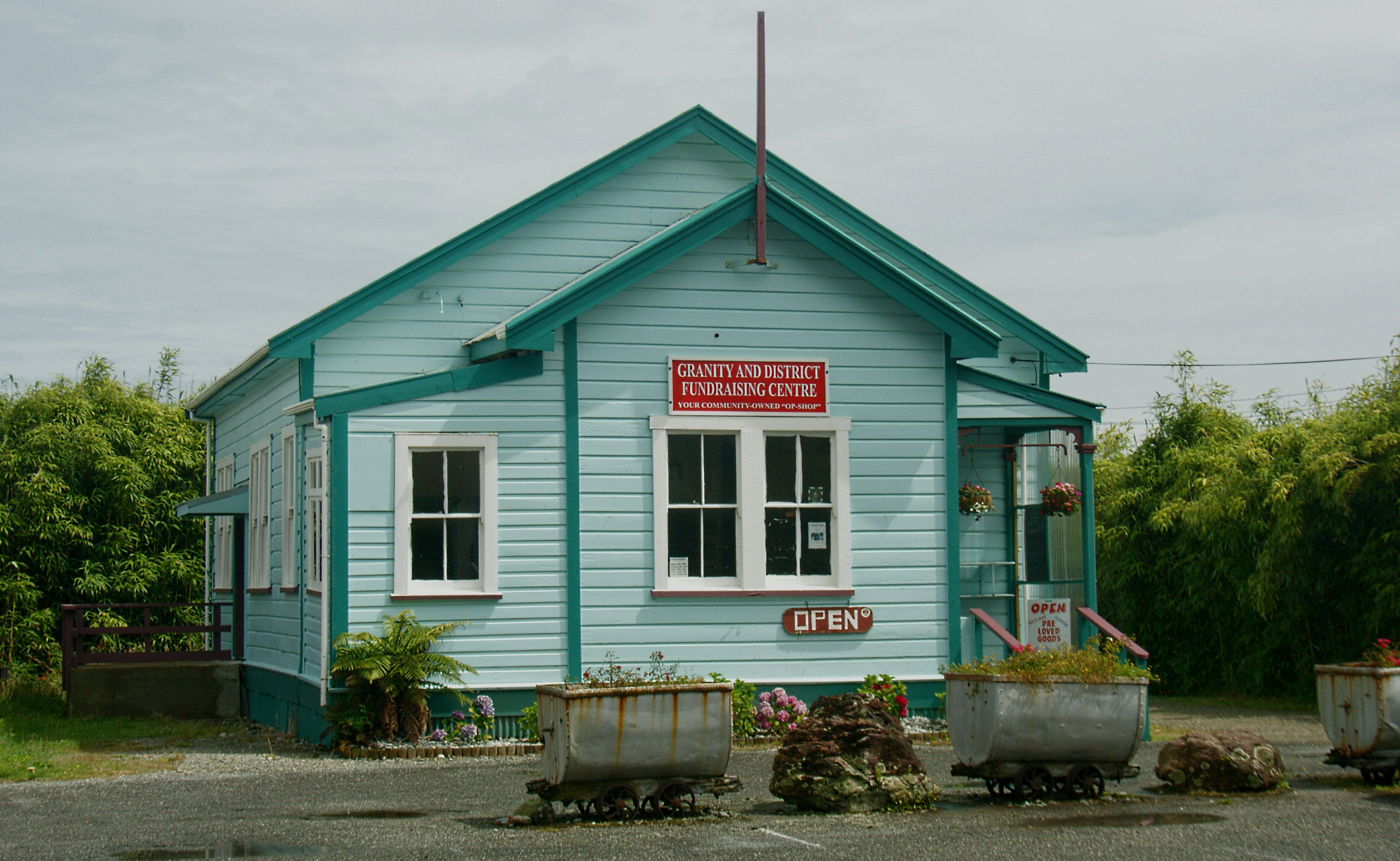
Fund-raising Centre - the community "op-shop"

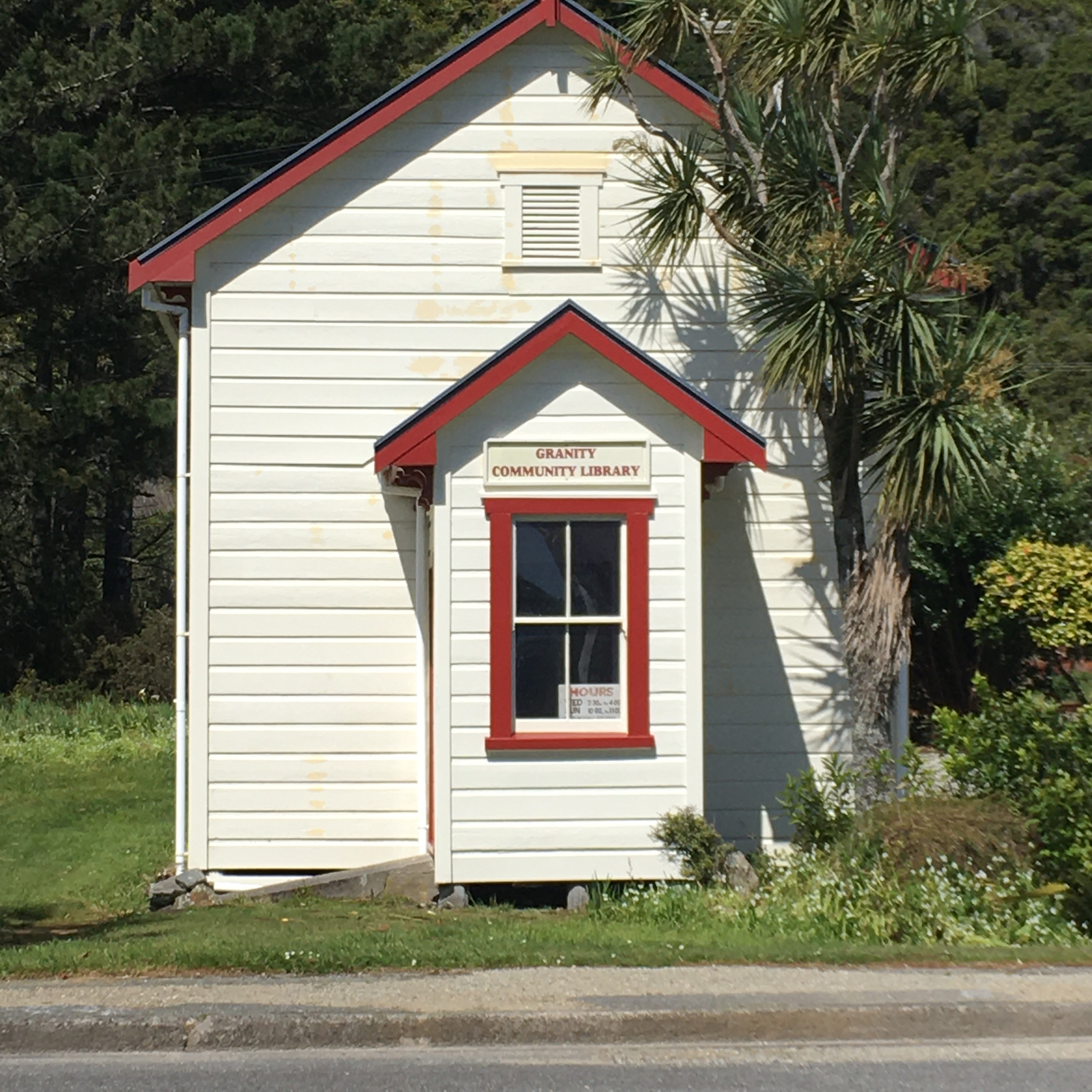
Granity Community Library
