= Glasgow Range =

Mountain range in New Zealand

Coordinates: 41.5989°S 172.0603°E

The Glasgow Range is a mountain range on the northern West Coast of New Zealand's South Island. It is north of the Papahaua Range and its most significant river is the Mōkihinui River.

== History of settlement ==
The Glasgow Range is largely devoid of settlement, though near the Tasman Sea coastline in the foothills are small localities such as Mokihinui and Seddonville. Upon the discovery of coal, the Seddonville Branch railway was built into the foothills in the 1890s, but mining activity declined in the 1970s and the railway closed beyond Ngakawau on 3 May 1981.

== Geology and weather ==
Granite soil of poor fertility characterises the Glasgow Range. The climate is cool, humid, and cloudy. Rainfall averages 5,600–6,400 millimetres and is largely brought by westerly winds. Evaporation is low and snow is common during winter.

== Wildlife ==
A rare mollusc, Powelliphanta lignaria rotella, is found only on the western slopes of the Glasgow Range in the Seddonville area and is considered nationally endangered. Found throughout the range are goats, while red deer were numerous prior to helicopter hunting that was especially popular in the 1970s.
