= Stockton Plateau =

Stockton Plateau can refer to

- Stockton Plateau in West Texas
- Stockton Plateau in New Zealand
