= Charming Creek Tramway =

Bush tramway in New Zealand

Coordinates: 41.61002°S 171.882606°E

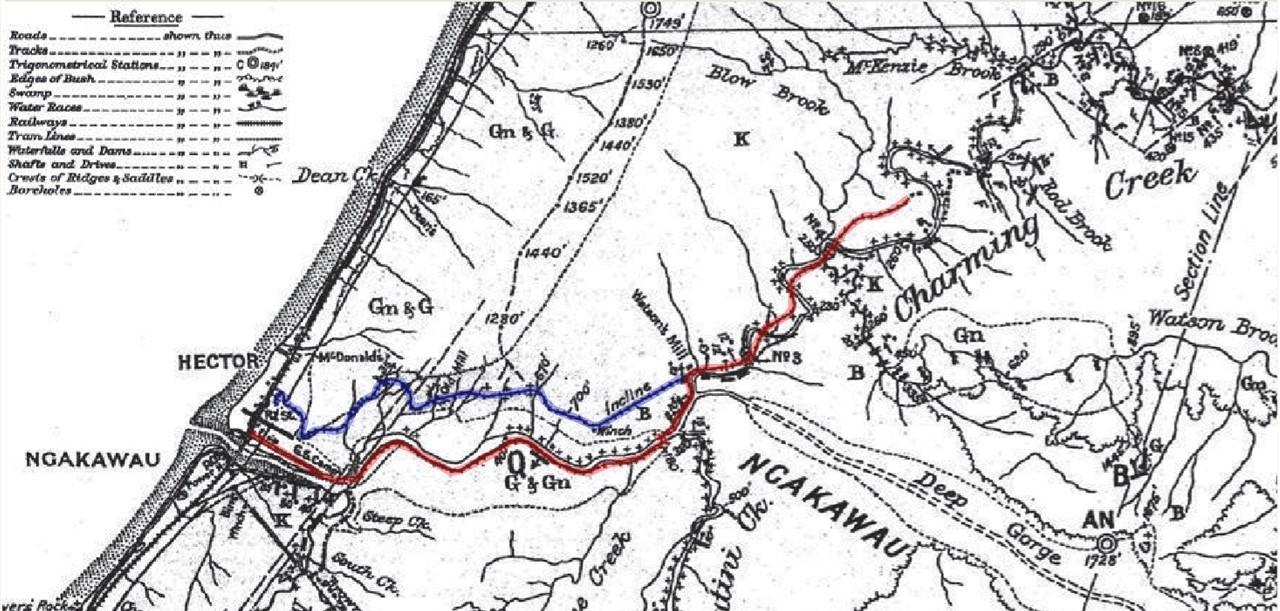

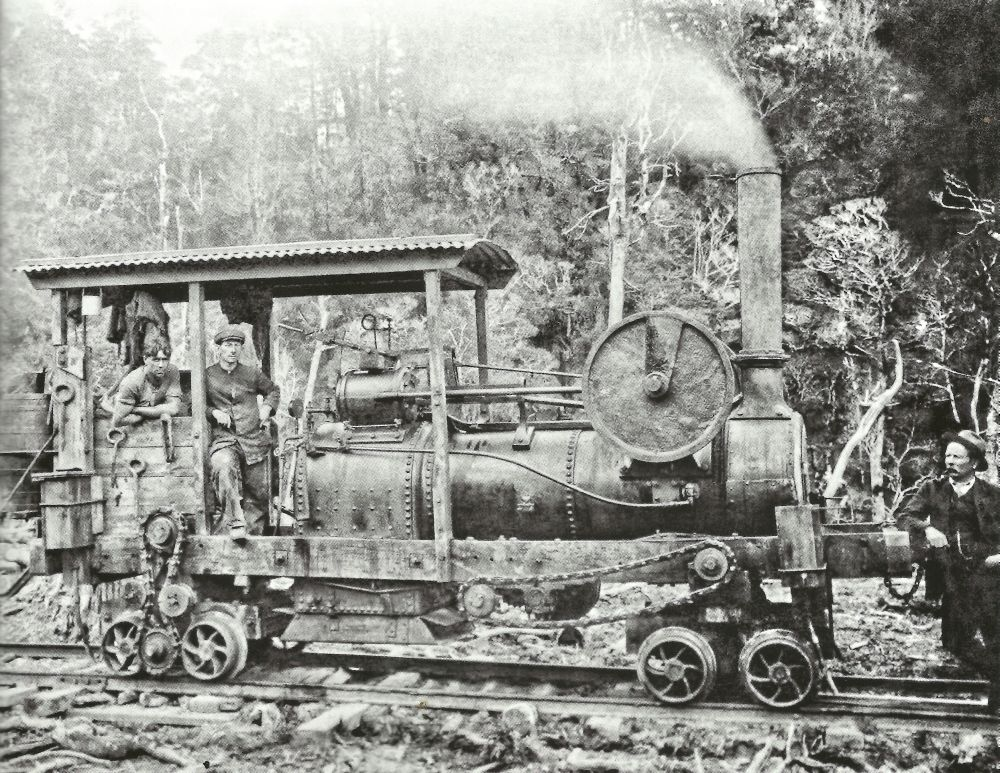
- Makeshift steam locomotive made by Robert T. Watson using a mobile boiler of Ruston & Procter

History
- Opened: 1903 or 1905
- Closed: 1958

Technical
- Line length: 16.5 miles (26.6 kilometres)
- Track gauge: 1,067 mm (3 ft 6 in)

The Charming Creek Tramway was a 9 kilometres (5.6 mi) long private bush tramway at Ngakawau in Buller District on the West Coast in New Zealand. It was used from 1903 or 1905 to 1958. Part of the trackbed is now a public walkway, but the southern portion of the route is permanently closed due to rockfalls and no through route is passable.

== Location ==
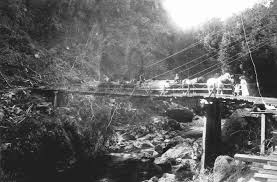
Timber being hauled by a horse tram over the first suspension bridge over the Ngākawau River

The logging railway with a gauge of 1067 mm (3-foot 6inch) was used to bring timber from the bush in the Charming Creek Valley to Watson's Mill and from there to Ngakawau railway station of New Zealand Government Railways (NZR). Later, the line was also used to transport coal from the Charming Creek Coal Mine to the coal bins near Ngakawau for reloading it into NZR wagons.

== History ==
=== Logging railway ===
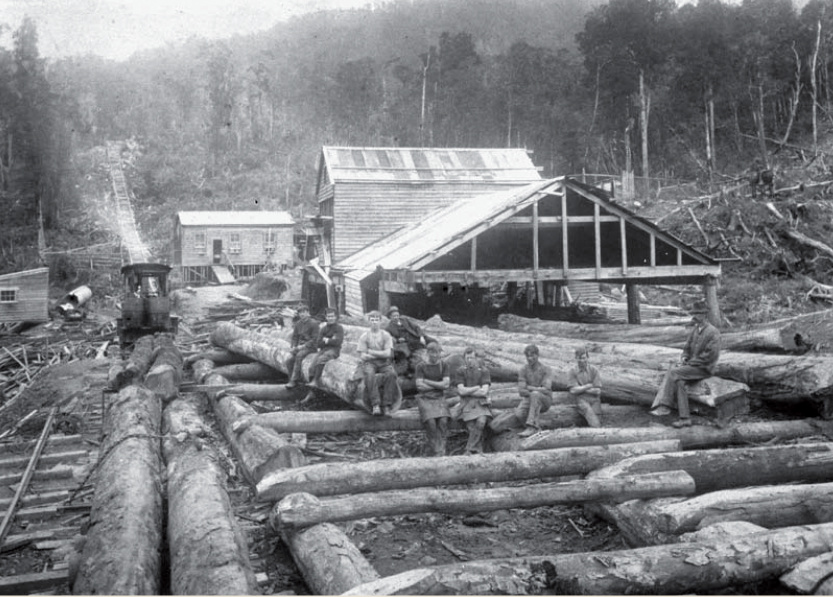
Watson's Mill with the incline in the background, ca. 1920

The brothers George and Robert Watson commissioned the new Watson's Mill at Ngakawau in 1903 or 1905, after their Granity Creek Sawmill had burned down to the ground under suspicious circumstances, without being insured against fire. The new location was surrounded by plenty of bush for logging and was located near a NZR railway line. To achieve a cost-effective transport, and because the steep Ngakawau Gorge was not suitable as a route for hauling timber by horses or oxen, the Watson brothers built a forest railway from the sawmill on the north side of the Ngākawau River to Hector. This had a very steep incline, which fell down to the mill and which was mastered by an 8-horsepower hilltop steam winch similar to a funicular.^{p. 7}

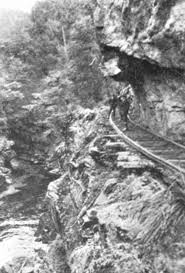
Complicated route via a cutting for the tramline with wooden rails

As the first forest railway had presumably been uneconomic or inefficient to operate because of the steep incline, a new logging railway was built between 1907 and 1912, from the mill through the steep Lower Ngakawau Gorge to the railway line in Ngakawau. The construction of the logging railway was a technical masterpiece with elaborate cuts, embankments, tunnels and bridges. One of the tunnels, however, was called the Irishman's Tunnel, as it was constructed with an S-shaped bend to compensate for a fault, which was noted, when the tunnel boring teams, who propelled from both sides did not meet. Due to the steep topography of the Lower Ngakawau Gorge, this stretch of track had many tight turns and a very steep 1:7 (14 ‰) downward slope. Initially, the track had wooden rails. These were replaced by steel rails in the 1920s, when the use of steam locomotives and converted to rail vehicles tractors was common. The gauge of the tram was chosen at 3 feet 6 inches (1,067 mm) to match that of New Zealand Rail (NZR). Steep sections of the tram had a raised wooden center rail for braking with a Fell style friction wheel drive.^{p. 7}

=== Mining railway ===
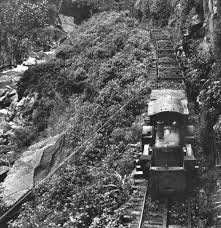
A WD 40 lokey with a rake of coal wagon crawling downhill

On 24 May 1926 Robert Watson and six other investors set up the Charming Creek Westport Coal Company (CCWCC) to mine hard coal just above the sawmill. On 9 September 1928 Robert Watson and another director of the CCWCC, SJ Akinson, died in a car accident at Buller Gorge, on their way home from a business trip to Christchurch.^{pp. 11–12}

In 1928, a 3.5 m (11 ft) thick coal seam was found after digging a flat, 200m long adit with a cross-section of 2.5 m × 2.25 m (8.2 ft × 7.4 ft). By the end of that year, 1928, a small amount of coal was mined. Contrary to the original plans to transport the coal in water-filled flumes into the valley, a mining railway was chosen as a means of transport for the coal. It was completed by 1929 and served both the wood and the coal transport. When the existing logging railway had to be extended from Watson's Mill to the coal mine, the entire route was reconstructed with reduced slopes and larger radii of curvature. The mine railway led directly into the mine. The coal was blasted off the face using the bord and pillar method of extraction and shovelled into coal wagons weighing 1.7 tons. These were brought to the surface with horses and then brought by a rail tractor on the logging and mining railway to Ngakawau. In Ngakawau, a coal bin was built, into which the coal from the lorries could be tipped from above, to load it later via chutes into the NZR coal wagons. The large wagons that transported the coal to Ngakawau required the installation of an improved centre brake rail and the use of a special brake car for safety reasons, if one of the couplings broke.^{p. 13}

== Locomotives ==
The first experimental steam locomotive was built by Seagar Bros. in 1909. It had a vertical boiler rated at 100 psi (7 bar) and an output of 8 hp. It did not prove her worth and was sold to Westport in 1910 as a pile driver.

A self-made construction with a transportable Ruston & Procter boiler (works No. 8698 from 1897) and only one cylinder was built on a wooden frame. The flywheel crankshaft turned the drive shaft via a sprocket and chain, and this turned the two-axis bogies via another sprocket and chain. The boiler was removed in 1913 and was in operation until February 1918.

From May 1918, Watson used another locomotive, again with a transportable Ruston & Procter boiler. It probably had a similar structure and was in operation until February 1921.

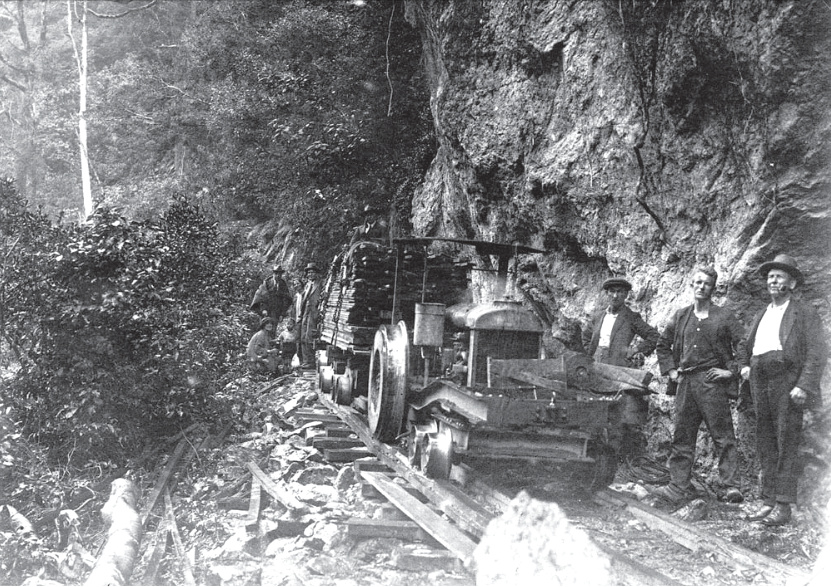
The first lokey at Charming Creek on its first run down the gorge in the mid-1920s

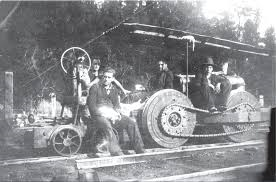
Lokey crews stop at the sand sheds for lunch

In addition, tractors of different sizes were converted to rail vehicles. In some of these tractors, all four wheels were driven by toothed chains.

== Historic relevance ==
=== Logging railway ===
In the period 1866–1914, the West Coast New Zealand timber industry served mainly the domestic market by a number of small local sawmill companies. Later, from 1915 to 1932, the West Coast became a major export-oriented wood production region. At its peak in the 1920s-1930s, Westland's timber accounted for about 20% of New Zealand's total produce.^{S. 48}

The Charming Creek sawmill became successful because of its own forest railway and state NZR railroads. The NZR enabled low-cost timber transport and required a lot of sawn beams and boards for sleepers and building products. In this context, the Charming Creek sawmill was representative of the previously relatively common type of sawmill, which focused on the supply of lumber for the home improvement and mining industries.^{S. 48}

=== Mining railway ===
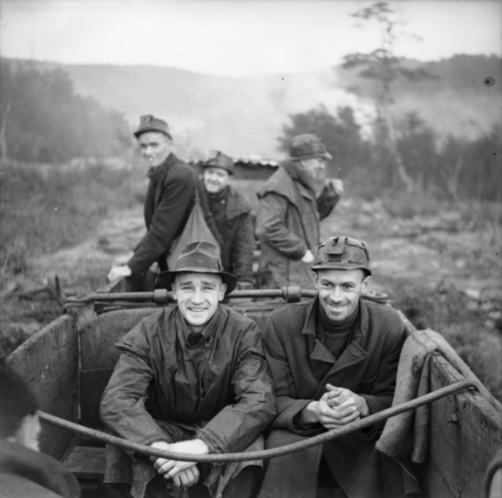
Miners on their way home after a long day under ground

At the beginning of the 20th century, when most of the Buller region's coal mines were operated by the government, Watson and his co-investors took the risk of building a coal mine that would eventually become one of the largest and most durable private coal mines in the region. The mine's location at the top of Charming Creek presented numerous difficulties in transporting the coal. New methods to increase efficiency were implemented, e.g. using hydro-mining and water for the transport of coal from the mine and the tribute system as a new employment system. In later years, the miners used strikes to put pressure on the mine owners to join the lobby for the completion of the Seddonville road.^{p. 49}

== Current use ==
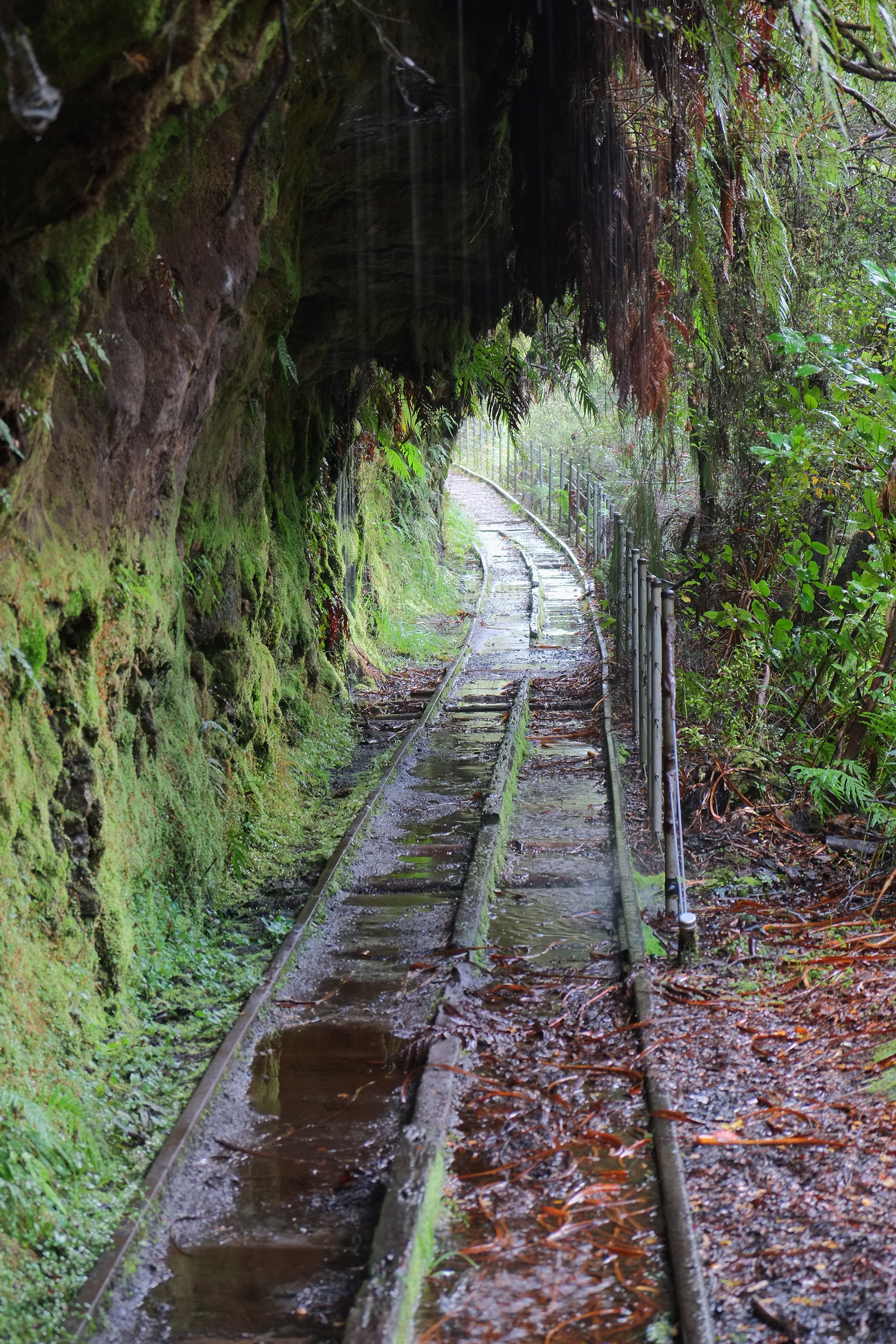
Charming Creek Walkway on the route of the logging and mining railway on 'The Verandah'

Today, a 5 kilometres (3.1 mi) hiking trail leads along the railway route from the eastern end past the former Charming Creek Coal Mine and over the ruins of Watson's Mill to a point opposite Mangatini Falls. The southern end of the track has been badly damaged by several major rockfalls and is permanently closed.
