= State Highway 67 (New Zealand) =

Road in New Zealand

State Highway 67

Route information
- Maintained by NZ Transport Agency Waka Kotahi
- Length: 51.3 km (31.9 mi)

Major junctions
- South end: SH 6 (Lower Buller Gorge Road) south of Westport, New Zealand
- North end: Route 67 (De Malmanches Road) at Mokihinui

Location
- Country: New Zealand
- Primary destinations: Westport, Waimangaroa, Granity, Hector/Ngakawau, Summerlea

Highway system
- New Zealand state highways; Motorways and expressways; List
← SH 65	→ SH 69

State Highway 67 (SH 67) is a New Zealand state highway located in the northern parts of the South Island of New Zealand. It is 51.2 km long usually on the coast and connects SH 6 with the settlement of Mokihinui. It used to be 96 kilometres long and ran the entire length of the road from Westport to Karamea The highway and its spur serves the large West Coast town of Westport and lies entirely within the Buller District.

== Route ==
SH 67 starts at SH 6 and proceeds in a northerly direction until the intersection with SH 67A. There the road turns right and crosses the Buller River to enter the township of Westport. Once in the CBD, the highway turns right and proceeds in an easterly direction until it crosses the Orowaiti River.

The road passes through alternating areas of farmland and temperate rainforest vegetation as it passes the settlements of Waimangaroa (turn right here for Denniston), Birchfield, Granity (turn right here for Millerton, Stockton and Stockton Mine), Ngakawau and Hector. Before Hector the road crosses the Ngākawau River.

Beyond Hector, the road acts as a frontier between the coastline and the adjoining hills until it reaches Waimarie and Summerlea, where it swings inland towards Mokihinui and its turn-off to Seddonville. The State Highway ends at the bridge across the Mōkihinui River, but the road continues to Karamea as Regional Route 67 using white shields.

== Spur sections ==
State Highway 67A
- Location: Westport–Cape Foulwind
- Length: 8.9 km (5.5 mi)

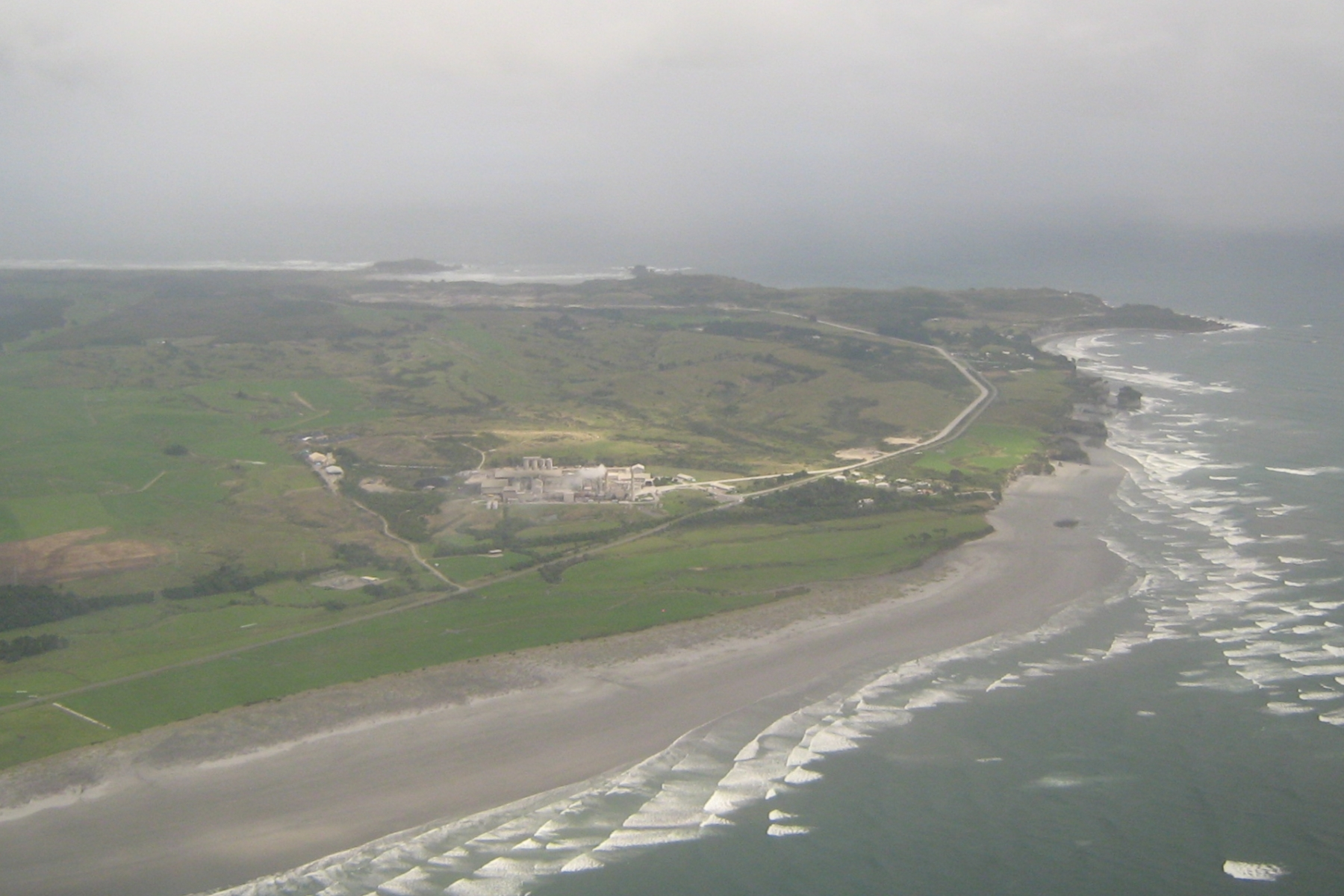
SH 67A terminating at the Holcim cement plant

State Highway 67A (SH 67A) is a spur of SH 67. It is 8.9 km long and connects Westport with the settlements of Carters Beach and Cape Foulwind, as well as the site of the former Holcim cement plant which closed in 2016.

== Upgrade works ==
In 2020, Waka Kotahi was allocated $2.5 million in funding to re-inforce State Highway 67 in the section between Granity and Ngakawau, as part of the New Zealand Upgrade Programme. The funding is to allow strengthening works on bridge abutments as part of improving the resilience of the highway.

== See also ==
- List of New Zealand state highways
- New Zealand Travel Atlas, Pages 46 und 50, Wise Maps Auckland ISBN 0-908794-47-9
