= Mōkihinui River =

River in New Zealand

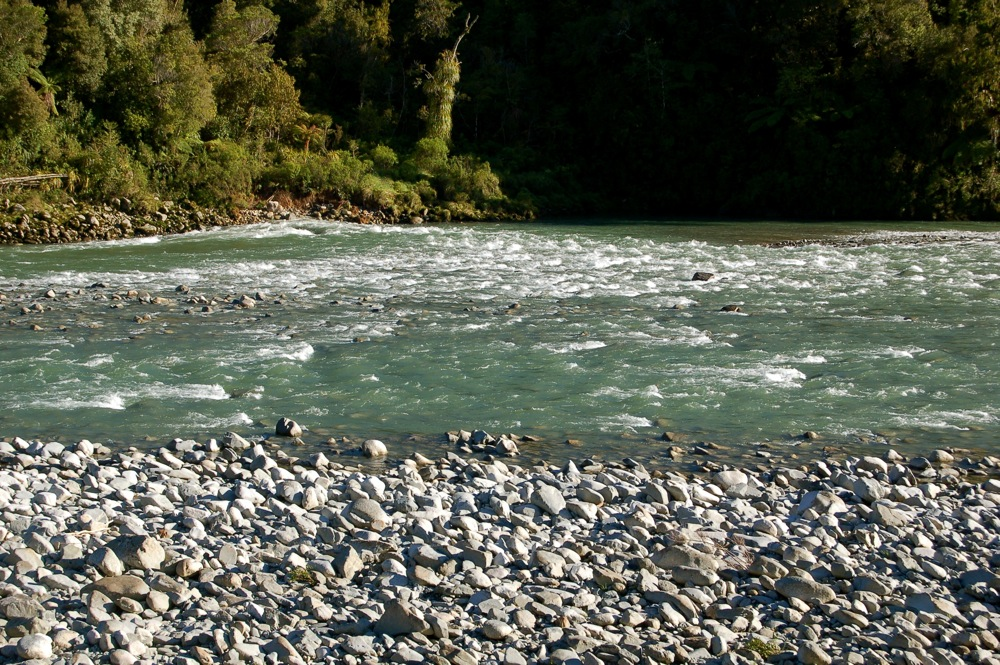
- Mōkihinui River by the Rough n' Tumble Bush Lodge
- Route of the Mōkihinui River
- Mouth of the Mōkihinui River Mōkihinui River (South Island)

Location
- Country: New Zealand

Physical characteristics
- Source: Allen Range (North Branch)
  - coordinates: 41.4373°S 172.4150°E
- 2nd source: Lyell Range (South Branch)
  - coordinates: 41.7207°S 172.1047°E
- Mouth
  - location: Karamea Bight
  - coordinates: 41°31′22″S 171°56′17″E
  - elevation: 0 metres (0 ft)
- Basin size: 750 km^{2} (290 sq mi)

Basin features
- Progression: Mōkihinui River → Karamea Bight → Tasman Sea
- Tributaries
  - left: Slate Creek (South Branch), Granite Creek (South Branch), Silver Creek (South Branch), Mountain Creek (South Branch), Owen Creek (South Branch), Hennessy Creek (South Branch), Limestone Creek (South Branch), Haystack Creek (North Branch), Sinclair Creek (North Branch), Specimen Creek, Jones Creek, Anderson Creek, Johnny Cake Creek, Welcome Creek, Burke Creek, Coal Creek, Page Creek, Chasm Stream, Marris Stream, Brewery Creek
  - right: Stern Creek (South Branch), Goat Creek (South Branch), Larrikin Creek (South Branch), Stoney Creek (South Branch), Allen River (North Branch), Māori Gully (North Branch), Pakihi Creek, Maori Creek, Rough and Tumble Creek, Podge Creek, Stillwater Creek, Sawyer Creek
- Bridges: Mōkihinui River Bridge

The Mōkihinui River is a river located on the West Coast of New Zealand's South Island, about 40 kilometres north of Westport. Meridian Energy had proposed the Mokihinui Hydro project on the river in 2007 but it was cancelled in May 2012. In 2019, it was announced that 64,400 ha (159,000 acres) of land in the Mōkihinui River catchment, including 15 km (9.3 mi) of river bed, would be added to Kahurangi National Park.

The New Zealand Ministry for Culture and Heritage gives a translation of "large flax-stalk raft" for Mōkihinui. Since 2019 the official name of the river has been spelled with a macron.

== Geography ==
Minister of Conservation, Eugenie Sage, announced the addition of the Mōkihinui River catchment to Kahurangi National Park in 2019

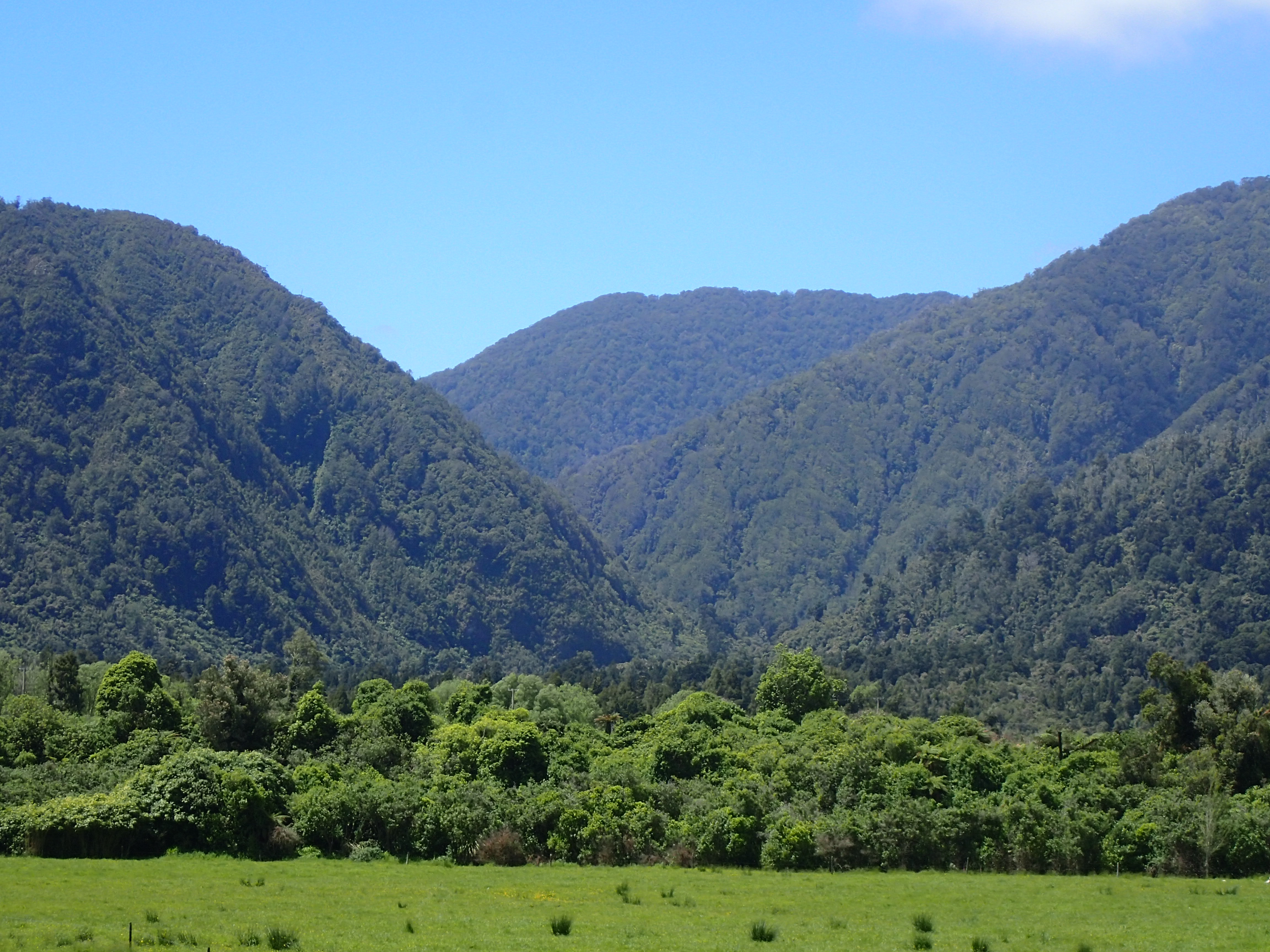
Mokihinui River Gorge as viewed from Seddonville

The Mōkihinui River's headwaters are located in the Glasgow Range and its mouth is on the Tasman Sea. There is little human habitation near the river: the localities of Mokihinui and Summerlea are near the river's mouth, Seddonville is a few kilometres up the river, and just prior to its terminus, State Highway 67 crosses the river outside Mokihinui. In the rugged back country behind Seddonville at the Mōkihinui Forks, the river splits into two branches, north and south.

The catchment of these two branches is a large inland basin of almost wholly unmodified forest. The total catchment area of the river is approximately 750 km^{2} (290 sq mi), with 685 km^{2} (264 sq mi) upstream of Seddonville. The area was highly rated for its biodiversity values, but prior to 2019, it was classified as stewardship land − the lowest level of protection for publicly owned conservation land. Following the cancellation of the proposed Mokihinui Hydro project on the river in 2012, work began to add the catchment area to the adjacent Kahurangi National Park. In 2019, 64,400 ha (159,000 acres) of land in the Mōkihinui River catchment, including 15 km (9.3 mi) of river bed, were added to the national park. The addition increased the size of the park by 14%. The area added to the park includes part of the route of the Old Ghost Road, a 85 km (53 mi) mountain biking and hiking trail that follows a historic gold miners' route.

Lake Perrine and Lake Dora are in the Mōkihinui Forks area. They are landslide lakes, dammed when slopes collapsed during the 1929 Murchison Earthquake. Lake Dora is 855 m (2,805 ft) long, up to 105 m (344 ft) wide and 15 m (49 ft) deep. Lake Perrine is now 5 km (3.1 mi) long, up to 450 m (1,480 ft) wide and 25 m (82 ft) deep. However, initially it dammed the river to a depth of 23 m (75 ft) at the entrance to the gorge, forming an 11 km (6.8 mi) lake. The earthquake created the dams on 17 June, but 8 m (26 ft) of the Lake Perrine dam washed out on 4 July 1929. It carried debris which formed a new temporary dam in the gorge below Seddonville. That water backed up until some buildings in Seddonville were flooded to their rooftops. The wooden hall floated about 5 ch (100 m) before bumping against a shop. It was replaced by the H. E. Holland Memorial Library.

In an extreme weather event in December 2010, the flow in the river reached 2,853 cumecs. The estimated return period for this event is between 20 and 50 years. The flood caused significant property damage in the Seddonville area.

== Culture ==
Ngāi Tahu and Ngāti Waewae are the manawhenua tribes of the area.

== Recreation ==
A tramping track called the Old Ghost Road runs along the south bank of the river giving access to Kahurangi National Park.

The river of interest for recreation and commercial whitewater activities. There is three hours of grade III water downstream from where the north and south forks meet. A river level of 1.0–1.5 metres is an optimum flow.

== Railway ==
The last few kilometres of the former Seddonville Branch railway roughly followed the Mōkihinui River near its mouth. The Branch opened on 23 February 1895 and closed on 3 May 1981, while a further extension beyond Seddonville to Mokihinui Mine closed in February 1974.

During this period, the New Zealand Railways Department dumped two old steam locomotives along the river's banks between Seddonville and Mokihinui Mine to protect against erosion. The first of these locomotives, W^{B} 292, was dumped in 1958, while sister W^{B} 299 was dumped in January 1960. Both were recovered from the Mōkihinui River in 1989 by the Baldwin Steam Trust, and are under restoration at the Rimutaka Incline Railway.
