= Seddonville Branch =

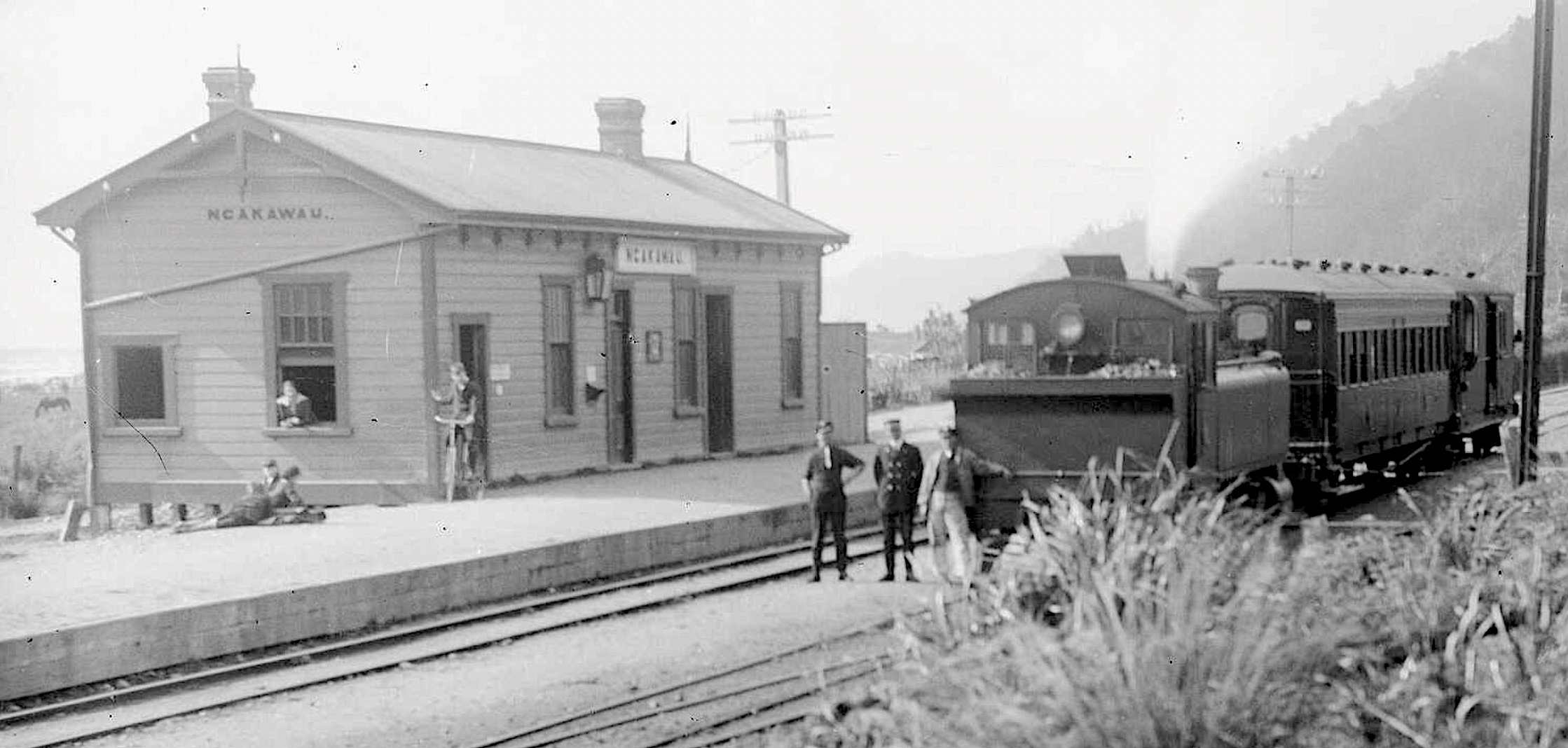
- Ngākawau about 1910

Overview
- Other name(s): Ngākawau Branch; Mount Rochfort Railway
- Status: Open
- Owner: Railways Department
- Locale: West Coast, New Zealand
- Termini: Westport; Seddonville
- Stations: 12

Service
- Type: Heavy Rail
- System: New Zealand Government Railways (NZGR)
- Services: 1
- Operator(s): Railways Department

History
- Commenced: 3 March 1874
- Opened: 31 December 1875
- Completed: 23 February 1895
- Closed beyond Seddonville: 10 February 1975
- Closed beyond Ngākawau: 3 May 1981
- Absorbed into Stillwater - Ngākawau Line: 5 November 2009

Technical
- Line length: 22.19 km (13.79 mi)
- Number of tracks: Single
- Character: Rural
- Track gauge: 3 ft 6 in (1,067 mm)

Map

The Seddonville Branch, later truncated as the Ngākawau Branch, is a branch line railway in the West Coast region of New Zealand's South Island. Construction began in 1874 and it reached its terminus at the Mokihinui Mine just beyond Seddonville in February 1895. In May 1981 it was closed past Ngākawau and effectively became an extension of the Stillwater–Westport Line, since formalised as the Stillwater–Ngākawau Line.

== Construction ==
The branch was built for transporting coal from mines to the harbour at Westport. Unlike most other railways of the era, there was no expectation that it would open up country for settlement and farming, as the terrain was mountainous and not suited to settlements of significant size.

Coalfield surveys had identified significant deposits of bituminous coal on the Mount Rochfort and Stockton plateaus high above the coastal plain and outcrops of sub-bituminous coal had been located at low level close to the rivers at Waimangaroa and Ngākawau. However, none of this coal could be accessed because of a lack of transport along the plain to the Buller River at Westport, which was large enough for ships to access.

Surveying of the line began on 3 March 1874 and construction began on 13 July 1874. The first section opened to Fairdown on 31 December 1875. Waimangaroa was reached on 5 August 1876 and regular services began operating. The section to Ngākawau opened for traffic on 26 September 1877, bringing the length to 30 kilometres (18.6 miles). By mid-1878 only one mine, that of the Wellington Coal Company on the north bank of the Waimangaroa River, had opened, and the amount of traffic between Waimangaroa Junction and Ngākawau was so low that that section of the line was mothballed until 1883. It then reopened to allow stone for harbour works at Westport to be transported.

The impact of the Long Depression limited government funds available for railway construction, and no extension of the line occurred for over a decade. By the end of the 1880s, the economic position was improving and work commenced on extending the line to Seddonville. On 8 August 1893 it opened to Mokihinui, and on 23 February 1895 the New Zealand Railways Department acquired a 6.2 kilometre (3.8 mile) private line from Mokihinui through Seddonville to the Mokihinui Mine, run by the Mokihinui Coal Company. Some of the funds for the construction of the Ngākawau-Mokihinui section and the purchase of the Mokihinui line were provided by the Westport Harbour Board.

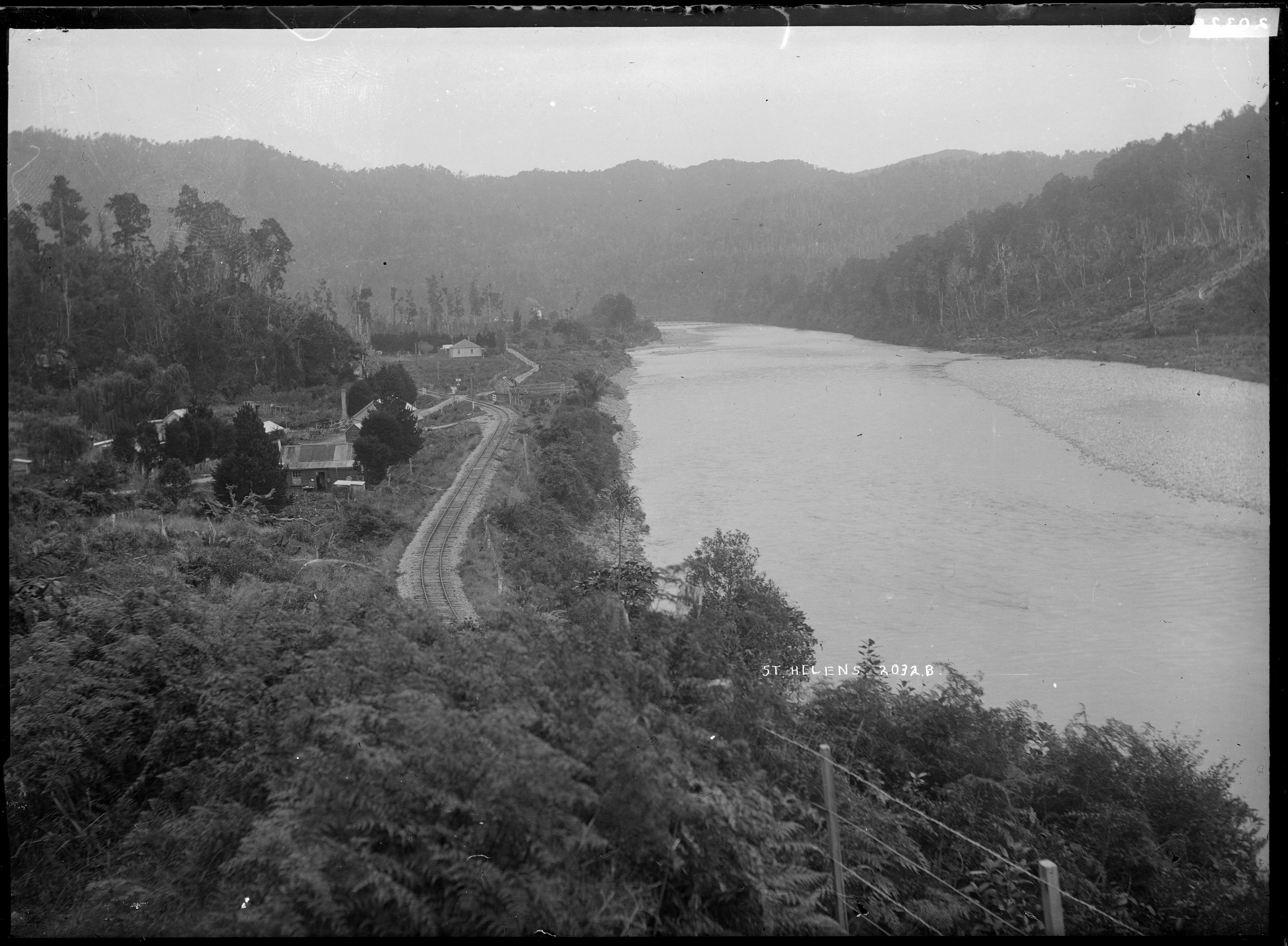
Mokihinui, on the south bank of the Mokihinui River

== Names and stations ==
The Westport to Seddonville line has had several names. It was first known as the Mount Rochfort Railway, then as the Westport Section of New Zealand Railways. After the Westport Section was linked to the main part of the South Island railway network in 1943 by the construction of a line through the Buller Gorge, it became known as the Seddonville Branch.

The following stations are or were on the Seddonville Branch (the distance from Westport is given in kilometres and miles):

- Sergeants Hill (5 km) (3.1 miles)
- Fairdown (10 km) (6.2 miles)
- Waimangaroa (15 km) (9.3 miles) – junction with the Conns Creek Branch, 1877–1967.
- Birchfield (20 km) (12.4 miles)
- Granity (27 km) (16.7 miles)
- Ngākawau (30 km) (18.6 miles)
- Hector (31 km) (19.2 miles)
- Nikau (39 km) (24.2 miles)
- Summerlea (40 km) (24.8 miles)
- Mokihinui (42 km) (26 miles)
- Seddonville (45 km) (27.9 miles)
- Mokihinui Mine (48 km) (29.8 miles)

== Operation ==
=== Passenger services ===
There were never passenger trains due to the low population: the Railways Department operated mixed trains, goods trains with passenger carriages attached. For a period they ran to Mokihinui Mine, but on 12 June 1933 they were cancelled beyond Seddonville. Services to Seddonville lasted another 13 years, and on 14 October 1946 the branch closed to passengers. Since then, the only passenger trains have been infrequent enthusiasts' excursions.

=== Freight services ===
In the branch's first half-century, freight was not confined to coal. However, as road transport became more prevalent, local businesses abandoned rail cartage and coal was virtually the only freight carried by the late 1930s. Coal tonnages were declining by this stage: in 1940, the branch was carrying just over half its pre-World War I peak of 800,000 tons. Nonetheless, coal traffic was more than sufficient to keep the branch in service. An early 1967 timetable had one train to Seddonville and the Mokihinui Mine and two to Ngākawau on weekdays, with shuttles from the Conns Creek Branch that diverged at Waimangaroa. Traffic from the Conns Creek Branch was declining and it closed later that year.

The 3 kilometre (1.9 mile) section beyond Seddonville to Mokihinui Mine closed on 10 February 1974 after the mine closed. Low demand for Buller region coal, decreased output and a decline in coastal shipping to Westport meant that the remainder carried reduced tonnages. Closure beyond Ngākawau was proposed in 1976, and although it operated a few more years, maintenance costs were increasingly higher than revenue and the branch beyond Ngākawau closed on 3 May 1981.

In the 1980s, traffic rose significantly despite closure beyond Ngākawau and trains ran across the South Island via the Midland Line to the deepwater harbour at Lyttelton rather than to Westport. In 1981, only 117,000 tonnes of coal were carried to Lyttelton; by 1989, this had risen to 600,000 tonnes. Due to the boom in traffic, bogie coal wagons were built to replace ageing four-wheeled stock of much lower capacity. In mid-June 2007, traffic was sufficient to justify five trains daily to Lyttelton. This later increased to seven, but by 2015, following the liquidation of Solid Energy, had been cut to four trains a day each way.

==== Tramways ====
Several tramways fed timber and coal traffic to the line. The most northerly was about 2 km (1.2 mi), from Coal Creek mine to Mokihinui, which was open by 1894. Charming Creek Tramway linked Ngākawau to a sawmill and later a mine. The Stockton mine railway also ran to Ngākawau. It had inclines and a 2 1/4 mi (3.6 km) electric railway. The 1 1/4 mi (2.0 km) Millerton Incline linked Millerton Mine to the branch at Granity.

=== Motive power ===
In September 1875, three C class 0-4-2T tank locomotives were shipped to Westport in readiness for the opening to Fairdown. It soon became apparent that greater motive power was required, and in 1898 four W^{B} class tanks were delivered. Three decades later they were followed by W^{W} class tank locomotives, the first of which arrived in 1929, which were the mainstay until dieselisation. The W^{W} class were limited on the steep 1 in 33 gradient beyond Seddonville to the Mokihinui Mine, capable of hauling only 180 tons. Occasionally other steam locomotives operated, including U^{C} class tender locomotives.

In late 1967 dieselisation began with the arrival of D^{SC} class and D^{J} class locomotivess. A year later, the W^{W} class had been largely replaced by D^{SC} class locomotives beyond Waimangaroa. By mid-1969 steam power had ended, and DJ locomotives, joined by the DC class in the 1980s, became the predominant motive power. With the de-electrification of the Otira Tunnel on the Midland Line in the latter half of the 1990s, motive power changed to powerful DX class locomotives modified to operate through the tunnel.

=== Line Reorganisation ===
On 5 November 2009 both the Ngākawau Branch and the Stillwater-Westport Line were officially reclassified as being a single railway. The new railway is called the Stillwater-Ngākawau Line. This designation includes what is now a short branch into Westport proper.

The former line from Ngākawau to Seddonville is still officially gazetted with the name Seddonville Branch Railway, despite the line having been removed shortly after the line was closed in the 1980s.

== Today ==
Some remnants of the branch beyond Ngākawau remain. Much of the formation remains visible, including embankments, cuttings and culverts. Part of the formation near Seddonville has been converted into the Chasm Creek Walkway, uses two bridges and one tunnel. The platform edge of Seddonville station remains, but the line to the Mokihinui Mine is now largely inaccessible as it is not near any roads.

At the end of their working lives, some locomotives and rolling stock were used to protect the branch from river erosion. Between 1958 and 1960, W^{B} class tank locomotives 292 and 299 were dumped on the bank of the Mōkihinui River to ensure the stability of the formation between Seddonville and Mokihinui Mine. In 1989 the Baldwin Steam Trust recovered the locomotives with the aim of restoring them to full operational condition. These locomotives are now located at Maymorn, Upper Hutt and are owned by the Rimutaka Incline Railway.
