= Ngākawau River =

Coordinates: 41°36′27″S 171°52′38″E

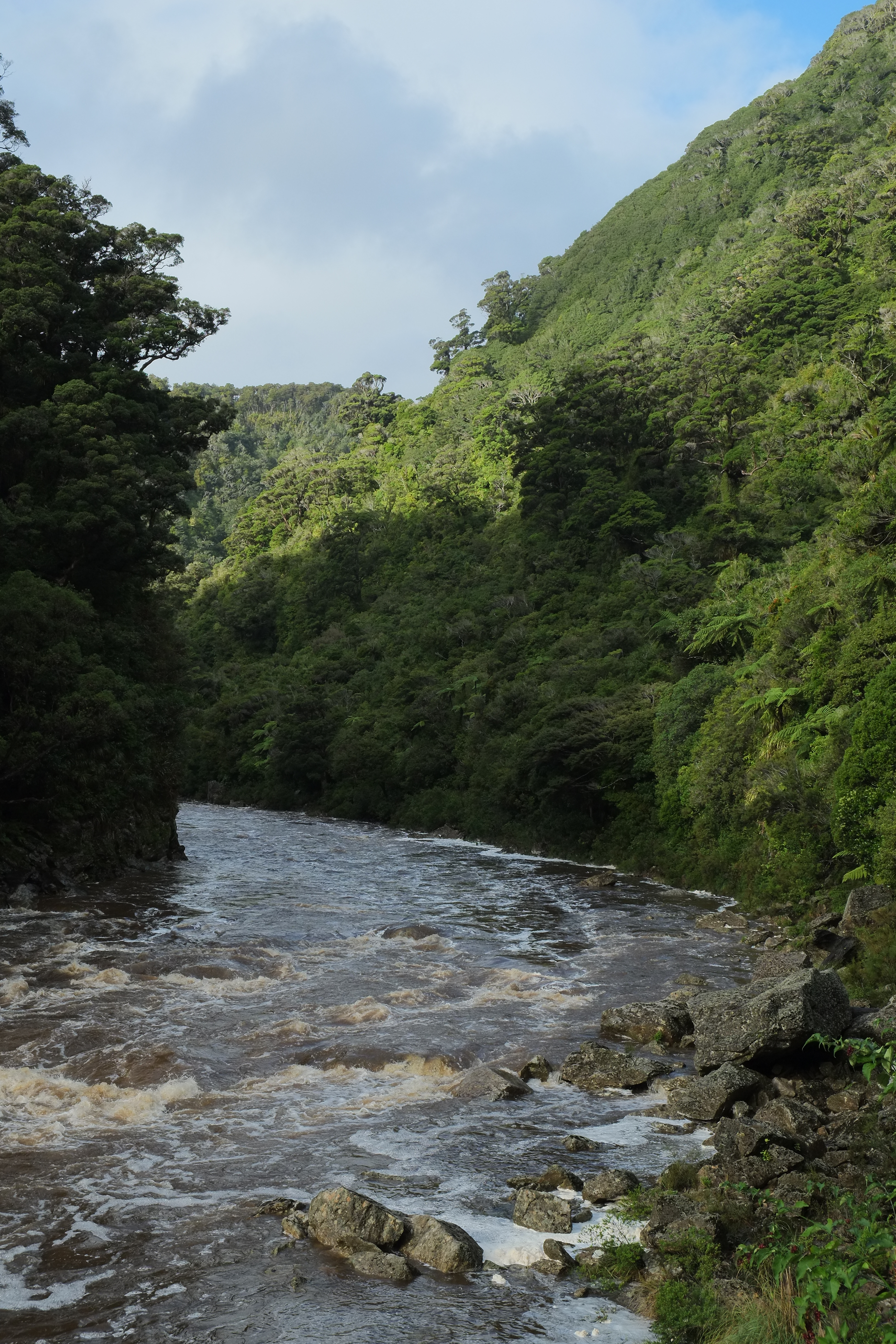
- Lower Ngakawau Gorge

Location
- Country: New Zealand

Physical characteristics
- Mouth
  - location: Karamea Bight
- Length: 19 km (12 mi)

The Ngākawau River is a river of the West Coast Region of New Zealand's South Island. It flows generally northwest, reaching the Tasman Sea at Hector.

The New Zealand Ministry for Culture and Heritage gives a translation of "the shags" for Ngākawau, the official name of the river since 21 June 2019.

The Charming Creek Railway line used to run alongside Ngākawau River in the Lower Ngākawau Gorge, transporting coal from mines in the Ngākawau River catchment area. The disused bush tram track now forms a section of the Charming Creek Walkway. 3 km into the gorge, Mangatini Stream joins Ngākawau River over the 25 m tall Mangatini Falls.

Parts of the Upper Ngākawau Gorge are the only known habitat of the rare daisy Celmisia morganii.

Ngākawau River is polluted with acid mine drainage and coal fines from the Stockton Mine. The proposed Stockton Plateau Hydro Project is expected to reduce the levels of pollutants.

The Ngākawau Riverwatch environmental group formed in 2001 to address the water pollution in the river.

State Highway 67 crosses the river about 150 m (490 ft) from the coast on a concrete bridge of 5 x 20 m (66 ft) spans built in 1983. It replaced a 1939 concrete bridge, which was built downstream from the former road-rail bridge on the Seddonville Branch.

== See also ==
- Rivers of New Zealand
