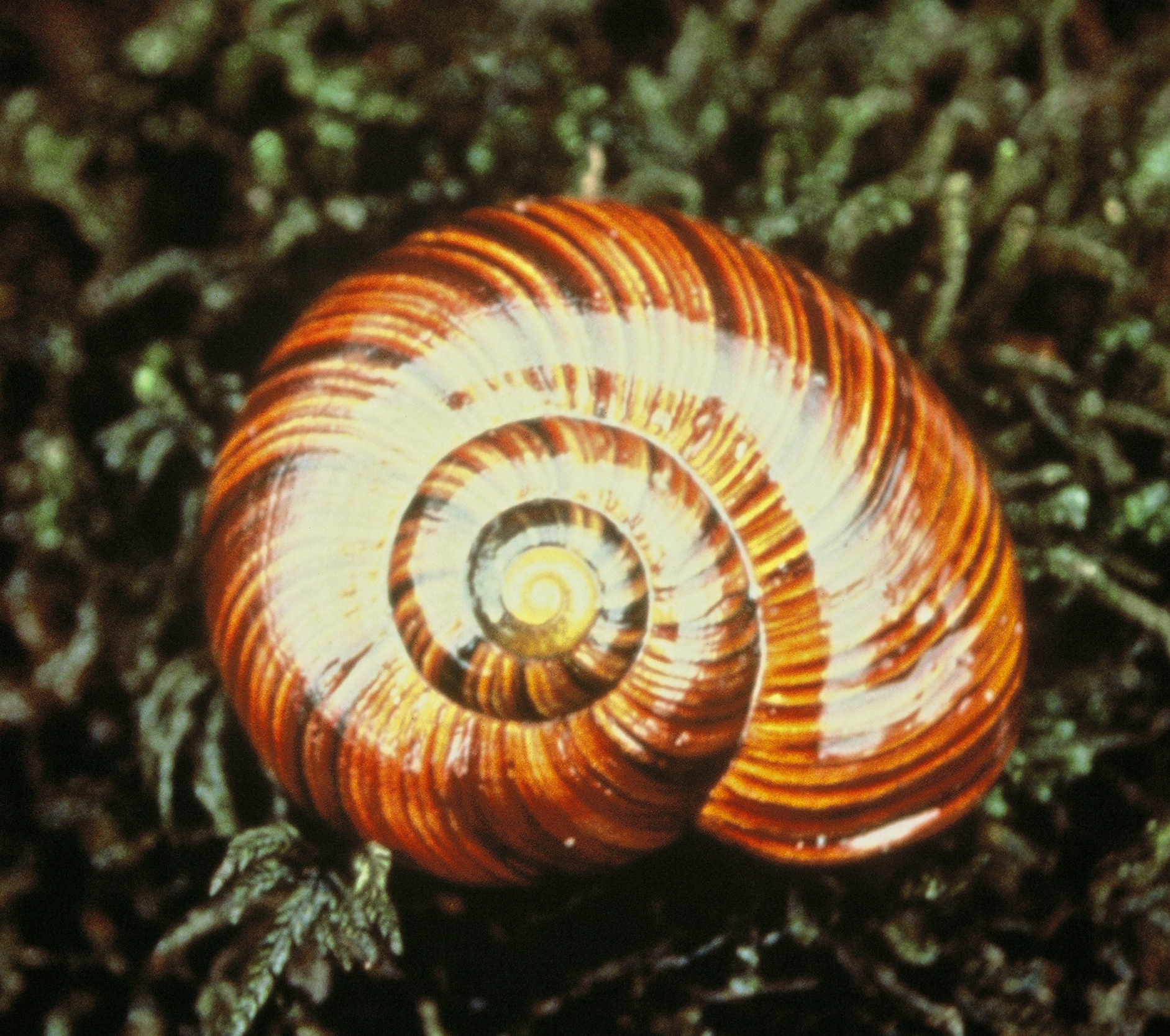
- Powelliphanta lignaria lusca shell

Conservation status
- Data Deficient (IUCN 2.3)

Scientific classification
- Kingdom: Animalia
- Phylum: Mollusca
- Class: Gastropoda
- Order: Stylommatophora
- Family: Rhytididae
- Genus: Powelliphanta
- Species: P. lignaria

Binomial name
- Powelliphanta lignaria (Hutton, 1888)

Synonyms
- Paryphanta lignaria Hutton, 1888

= Powelliphanta lignaria =

Species of gastropod

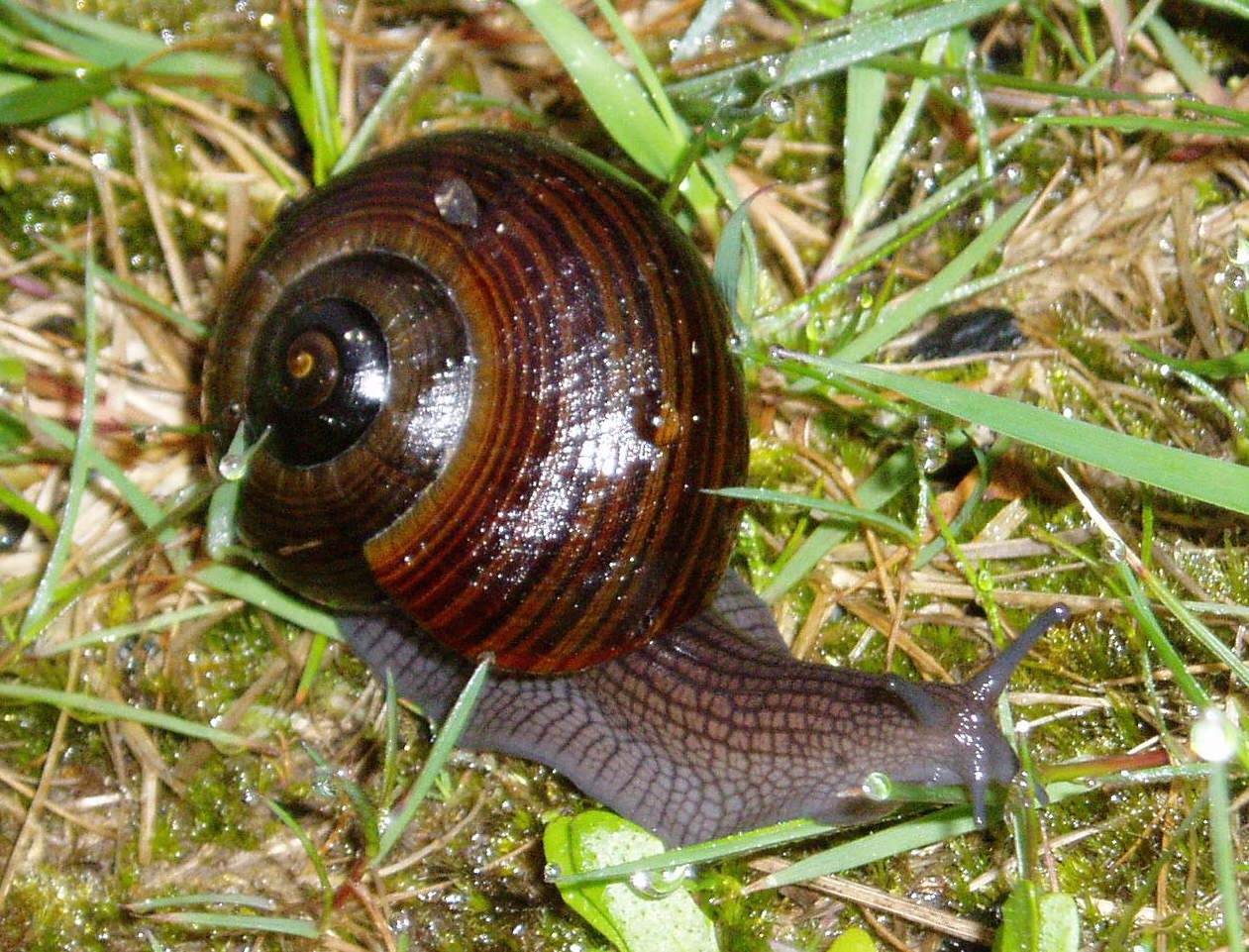
Powelliphanta lignaria johnstoni at Charming Creek, Buller District, New Zealand

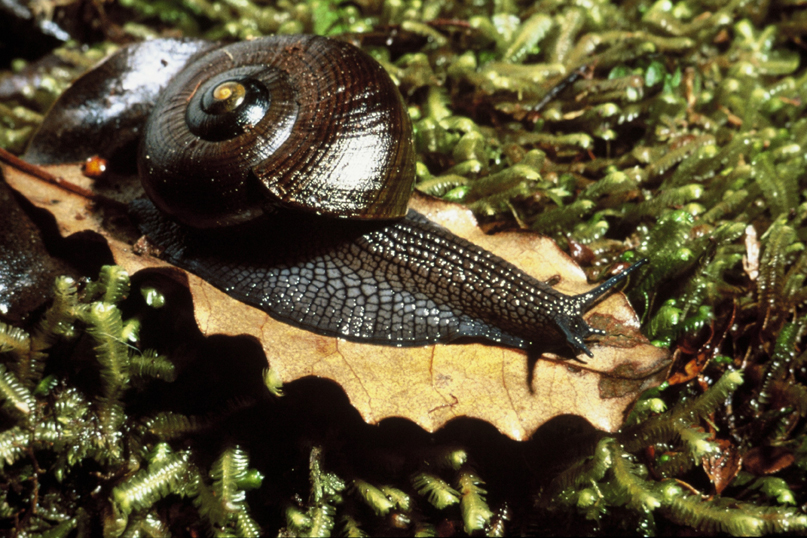
Powelliphanta lignaria johnstoni, Mōkihinui River area

Powelliphanta lignaria, known as one of the amber snails, is a species of large, carnivorous land snail, a terrestrial pulmonate gastropod mollusc in the family Rhytididae. The eggs of P. lignaria are oval and seldom constant in dimensions 10 × 8.25, 9 × 7.75, 9 × 8, 8.75 × 7.75 mm.

P. lignaria is endemic to the west coast of the South Island of New Zealand. There are seven subspecies, all of which are listed by the New Zealand Department of Conservation as threatened:

- Powelliphanta lignaria johnstoni Powell, 1946 – Nationally Endangered
- Powelliphanta lignaria lignaria Hutton, 1888 – Nationally Vulnerable
- Powelliphanta lignaria lusca Powell, 1949 – Nationally Vulnerable
- Powelliphanta lignaria oconnori Powell, 1938 – Nationally Vulnerable
- Powelliphanta lignaria rotella Powell, 1938 – Nationally Endangered
- Powelliphanta lignaria ruforadiata Powell, 1949 – Nationally Endangered
- Powelliphanta lignaria unicolorata Powell, 1930 – Nationally Vulnerable
