= Mokihinui =

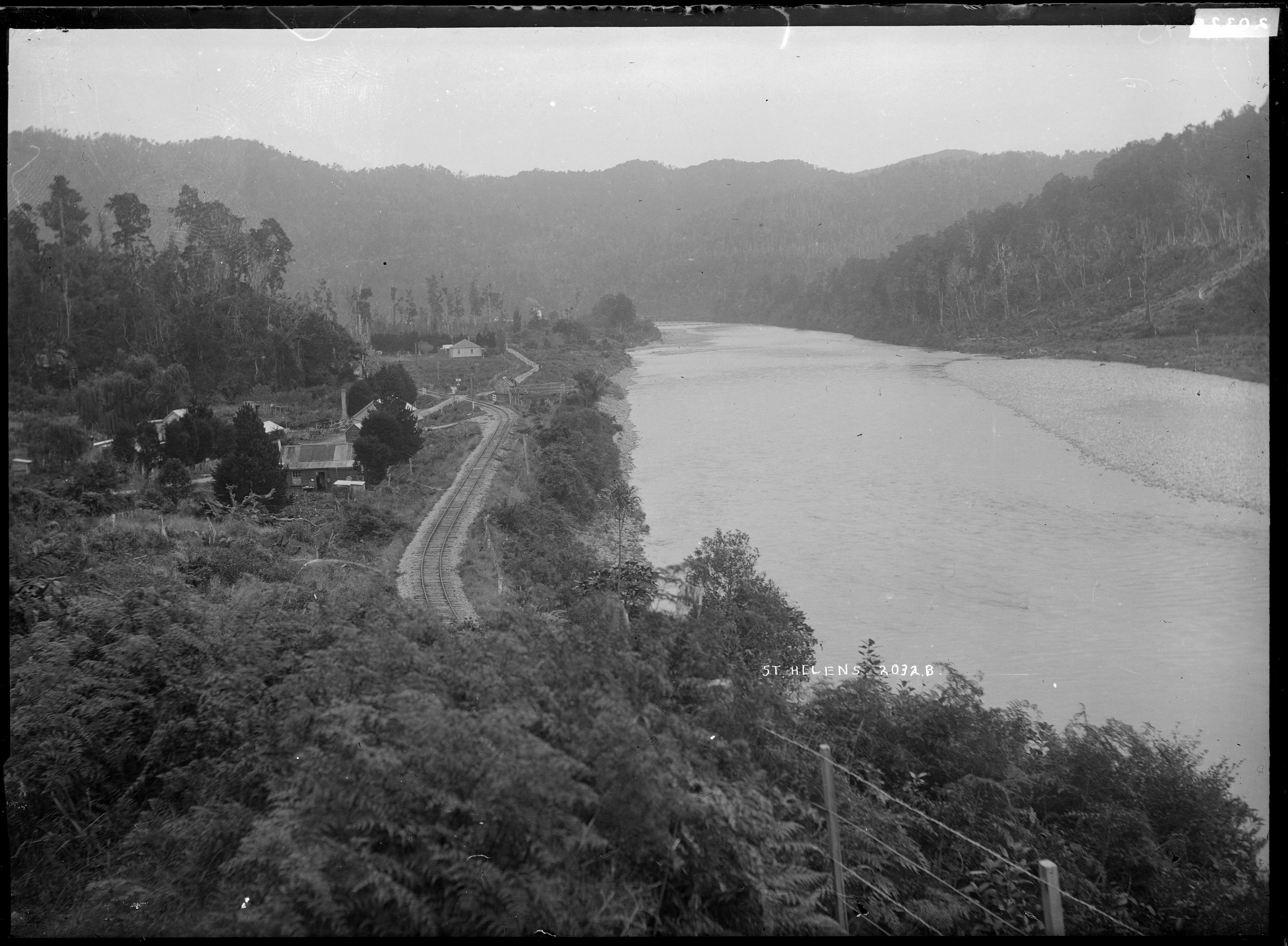
- Interactive map of Mokihinui
- Coordinates: 41°31′34″S 171°56′8″E
- Country: New Zealand
- Region: West Coast
- District: Buller District
- Electorates: West Coast-Tasman; Te Tai Tonga

Population (2023)
  - Total: 192

Mokihinui (Māori: Mōkihinui) is a lightly populated locality on the West Coast of New Zealand's South Island.

Mokihinui is on the Tasman Sea coastline north of Westport and is on the southern side of the Mōkihinui River's mouth, the third largest river on the West Coast. Once known as Waimarie, its official name is currently Mokihinui (without a macron), although it is named after the Mōkihinui River (officially spelled with a macron since 2019). Mokihinui is situated between the sea and the foothills of the Glasgow Range and State Highway 67 passes through Mokihinui just before reaching its northern end on the other side of the river. Statistics New Zealand includes Mokihinui in a statistical area of the same name that covers both the locality itself and its neighbours such as Seddonville and Summerlea. According to the 2013 New Zealand census, Mokihinui has a population of 186, an increase of 15 people since the 2006 census. Mokihinui's population increases during whitebait season, when visitors come to fish in the Mōkihinui River's mouth.

In the early 1890s, a branch line railway from Westport was opened to Mokihinui; it ultimately ran through to Seddonville and was known as the Seddonville Branch. Passengers were carried on mixed trains until trains became freight-only on 14 October 1946. The line continued to operate until the end of the 1970s, when the coal mining activity that provided almost the sole freight on the line declined to such a point that revenue was lower than maintenance costs. The railway closed north of Ngakawau on 3 May 1981 and traces of its formation can be seen in the countryside around Mokihinui.

== Demographics ==
Mokihinui and its surrounds, which include Summerlea and Seddonville, cover 530.86 km^{2} (204.97 sq mi). It is part of the larger Karamea statistical area.

Historical population
Year	Pop.	±% p.a.
2006	165	—
2013	171	+0.51%
2018	159	−1.44%
2023	192	+3.84%

The area had a population of 192 in the 2023 New Zealand census, an increase of 33 people (20.8%) since the 2018 census, and an increase of 21 people (12.3%) since the 2013 census. There were 108 males and 84 females in 99 dwellings. 4.7% of people identified as LGBTIQ+. The median age was 57.7 years (compared with 38.1 years nationally). There were 27 people (14.1%) aged under 15 years, 12 (6.2%) aged 15 to 29, 99 (51.6%) aged 30 to 64, and 54 (28.1%) aged 65 or older.

People could identify as more than one ethnicity. The results were 89.1% European (Pākehā), 18.8% Māori, 3.1% Pasifika, and 9.4% other, which includes people giving their ethnicity as "New Zealander". English was spoken by 98.4%, Māori by 1.6%, and other languages by 1.6%. No language could be spoken by 1.6% (e.g. too young to talk). New Zealand Sign Language was known by 1.6%. The percentage of people born overseas was 12.5, compared with 28.8% nationally.

Religious affiliations were 20.3% Christian, 1.6% New Age, and 4.7% other religions. People who answered that they had no religion were 60.9%, and 10.9% of people did not answer the census question.

Of those at least 15 years old, 6 (3.6%) people had a bachelor's or higher degree, 90 (54.5%) had a post-high school certificate or diploma, and 60 (36.4%) people exclusively held high school qualifications. The median income was $23,400, compared with $41,500 nationally. 9 people (5.5%) earned over $100,000 compared to 12.1% nationally. The employment status of those at least 15 was 42 (25.5%) full-time, 21 (12.7%) part-time, and 3 (1.8%) unemployed.
