= H. E. Holland Memorial Library =

Public library in Seddonville, New Zealand

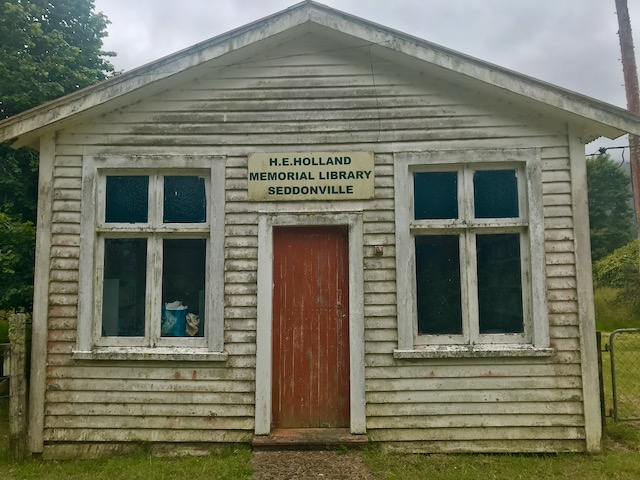
- H.E. Holland Memorial Library in 2019
- Interactive map of the H. E. Holland Memorial Library area

General information
- Type: Library
- Location: Seddonville, Queen Street, Seddonville
- Coordinates: 41°33′01″S 171°59′11″E
- Opened: 1929 (this building)

Technical details
- Floor count: Single storey

The H. E. Holland Memorial Library, also known as the Seddonville Community Library, is a community library located in Seddonville in the Buller District of the South Island of New Zealand.

== History ==
A library was first built in Seddonville in the early 1900s. This library was destroyed and the collection lost during a flood that followed the 1929 Murchison earthquake.

Harry Holland, leader of the Labour Party and MP for Buller, made a public appeal to replace the lost collection, and donations were received from libraries, booksellers and individuals around the country. Donations were carried free of charge by the Post Office. Cabinet approved 180 volumes from the General Assembly Library be donated, and altogether a collection of 2–3000 books had been acquired through donations from individuals and other libraries. In the meantime, the local community had raised enough funds, together with a £50 donation from the Mines Department, to pay for the new building outright. The library was officially reopened by Holland on 9 December 1929. In recognition of his efforts, the reopened library was named the H. E. Holland Public Library and Mr Holland was presented with an inscribed silver-mounted walking stick.

The library was renamed the H. E. Holland Memorial Library after Holland's death in 1933.

The building and collection were again extensively damaged by flooding on Boxing Day of 2010.

== Collection ==
The library is run by volunteers, and is supplied with a rotating collection from the Buller District Library.
