= Ngakawau Hydro Project =

Proposed hydro scheme in New Zealand

Ngakawau Restoration Project
- Country: New Zealand
- Location: West Coast, South Island, New Zealand
- Coordinates: 41.611°S 171.875°E
- Status: Planned
- Owner: Hydro Developments (2013) Ltd

Thermal power station
- Primary fuel: Hydropower

Power generation
- Nameplate capacity: 24 MW (32,000 hp)

The Ngakawau Restoration Project is a proposed hydro scheme planned to divert acid mine drainage from coal mines to an ocean outfall to restore water quality of the Ngākawau River, in the northern section of the West Coast of the South Island of New Zealand. The project is a configuration of the Stockton Plateau Hydro Scheme being developed by Hydro Developments (2013) Limited (the successor to Hydro Developments Ltd following voluntary liquidation). Project information can be found at https://hydrodevelopments.co.nz

In December 2008 Hydro Developments Ltd applied for resource consent for a 60 MW hydro scheme (the Stockton Plateau Hydro Scheme) using polluted water from the Stockton Mine. Consent was granted in January 2010. The scheme was expected to reduce acid mine drainage from the mine into the Ngākawau River, and was supported by the Green Party of Aotearoa New Zealand and other environmental groups.

In February 2010 Solid Energy applied for resource consent for an alternative 49 MW plant in the same area using the same resource (the Stockton Hyydro Scheme). In October 2010 both parties announced that they had reached an agreement on using water from the Stockton plateau for hydro-electricity and that they would abandon their respective Environment Court appeals of the others' scheme. Solid Energy's application was rejected in mid-2010, but consent was granted by the Environment Court of New Zealand in May 2012 subject to non-derogation of HDL's consents. Solid Energy went into voluntary administration in August 2015, and the Stockton mine site was eventually sold to Phoenix Coal (Bathurst-Talley Mining Ltd) in 2017.

In November 2019 Hydro Developments (2013) Ltd (HDL) applied for its resource consents to be extended as development of the Stockton Plateau Hydro Scheme was advanced, having been submitted to The Treasury as a long-term solution for managing the government's historic (pre-2017) acid mine drainage liabilities. A decision on the government's preferred solution is not expected until 2024 or until it is clearer when coal mining will cease. The coal mining licenses expire in 2027. The lapsing date for the consents were extended until 2026.

== See also ==
- List of power stations in New Zealand
