= Seddonville =

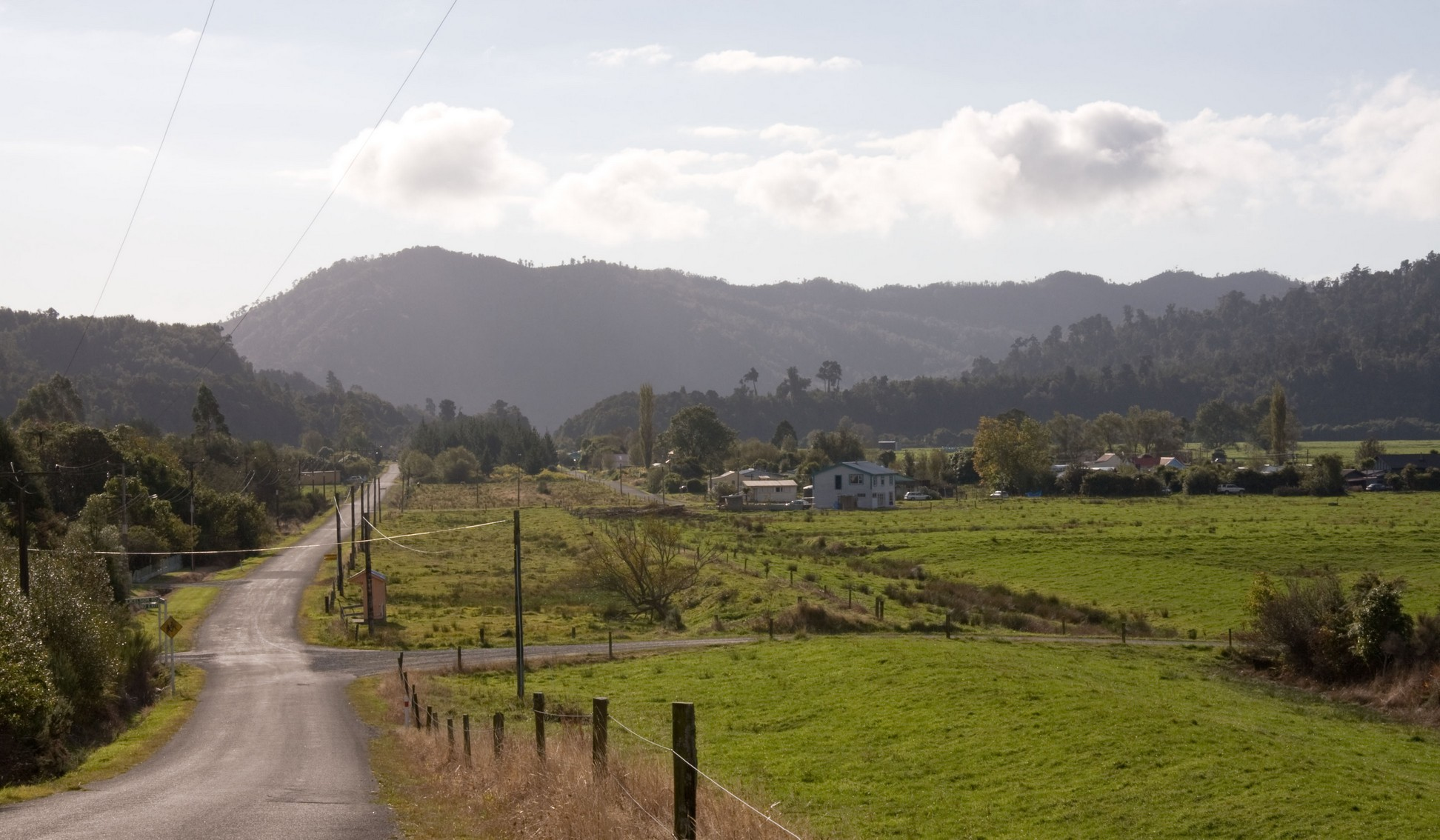
- Seddonville in 2009

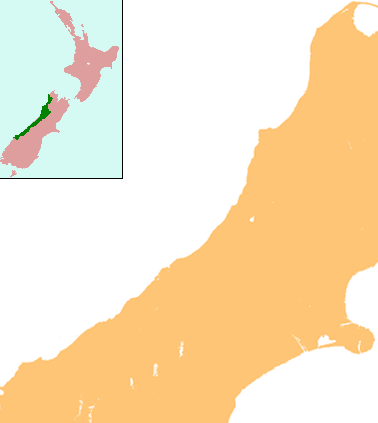
- Location within West Coast
- Coordinates: 41°33′6″S 171°59′24″E
- Country: New Zealand
- Region: West Coast
- District: Buller District
- Electorates: West Coast-Tasman; Te Tai Tonga

Population (2013)
  - Total: 53

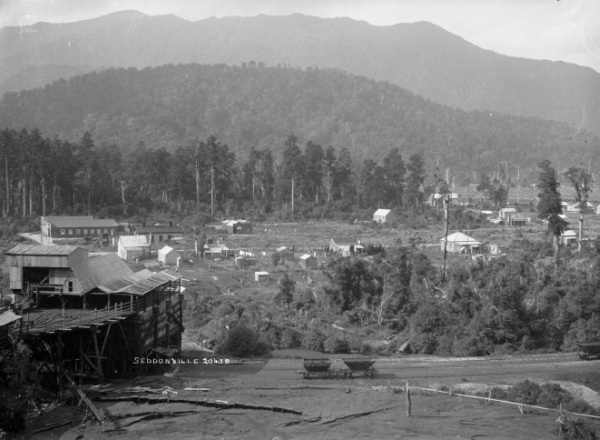
Historical Seddonville (time ca early 20th century)

Seddonville is a lightly populated locality on the West Coast of New Zealand's South Island. It is most famous for the historical role it played in New Zealand's coal mining industry.

== Geography ==
Seddonville is in the isolated north of the West Coast in the foothills of the Glasgow Range, on the southern bank of the Mokihinui River. To the west are Summerlea and Mokihinui on the coast of the Tasman Sea, and to the north is Corbyvale on the road to Karamea. State Highway 67 ends just before reaching Seddonville.

In 1911 Seddonville's population was 426, 222 in 1951, 70 in 1976 and in 2013 its 3 meshblocks totalled 53.

A rare mollusc, Powelliphanta lignaria rotella, is found only in the Seddonville area. It is considered nationally endangered.

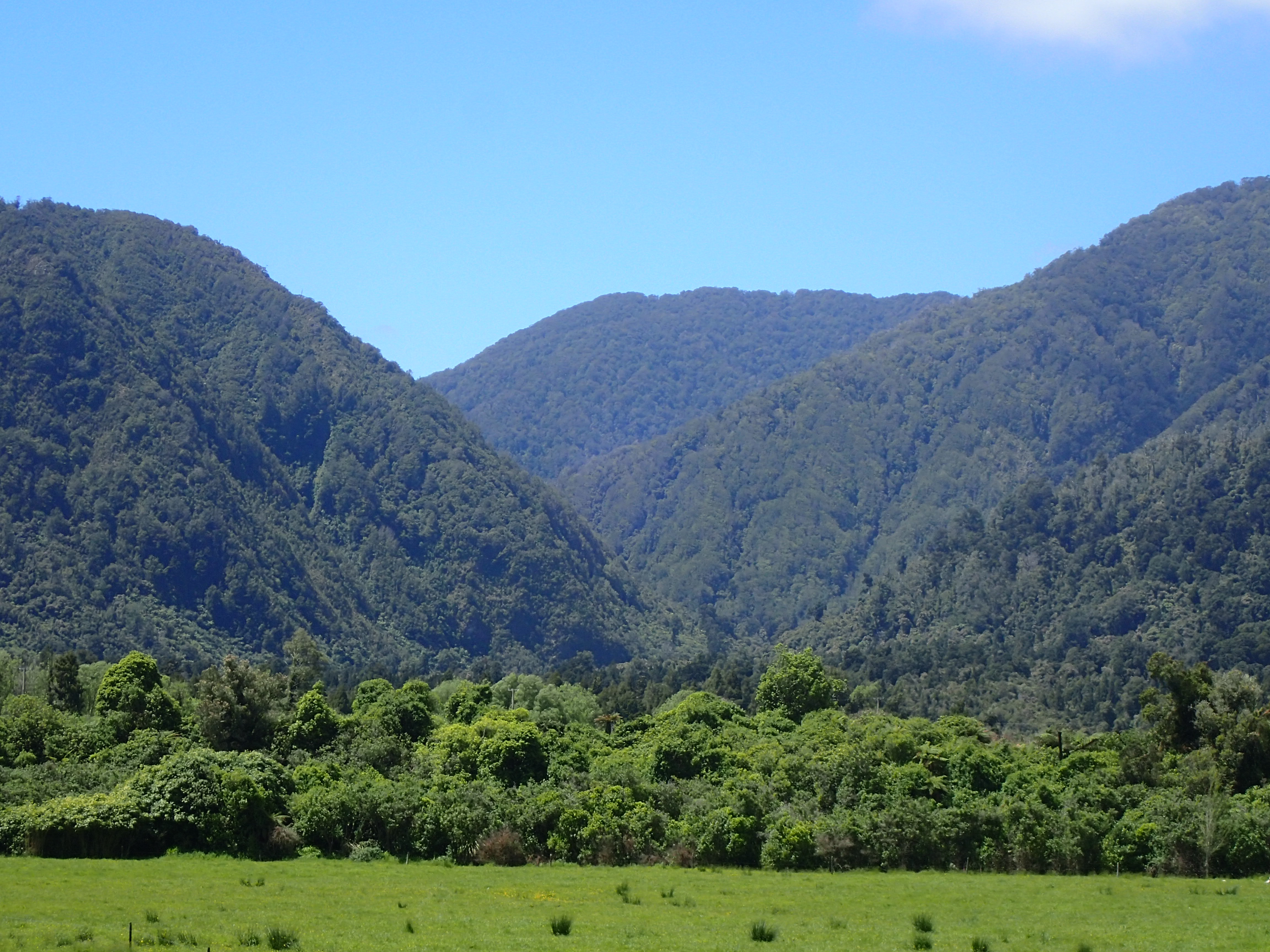
Mokihinui River Gorge as viewed from Seddonville

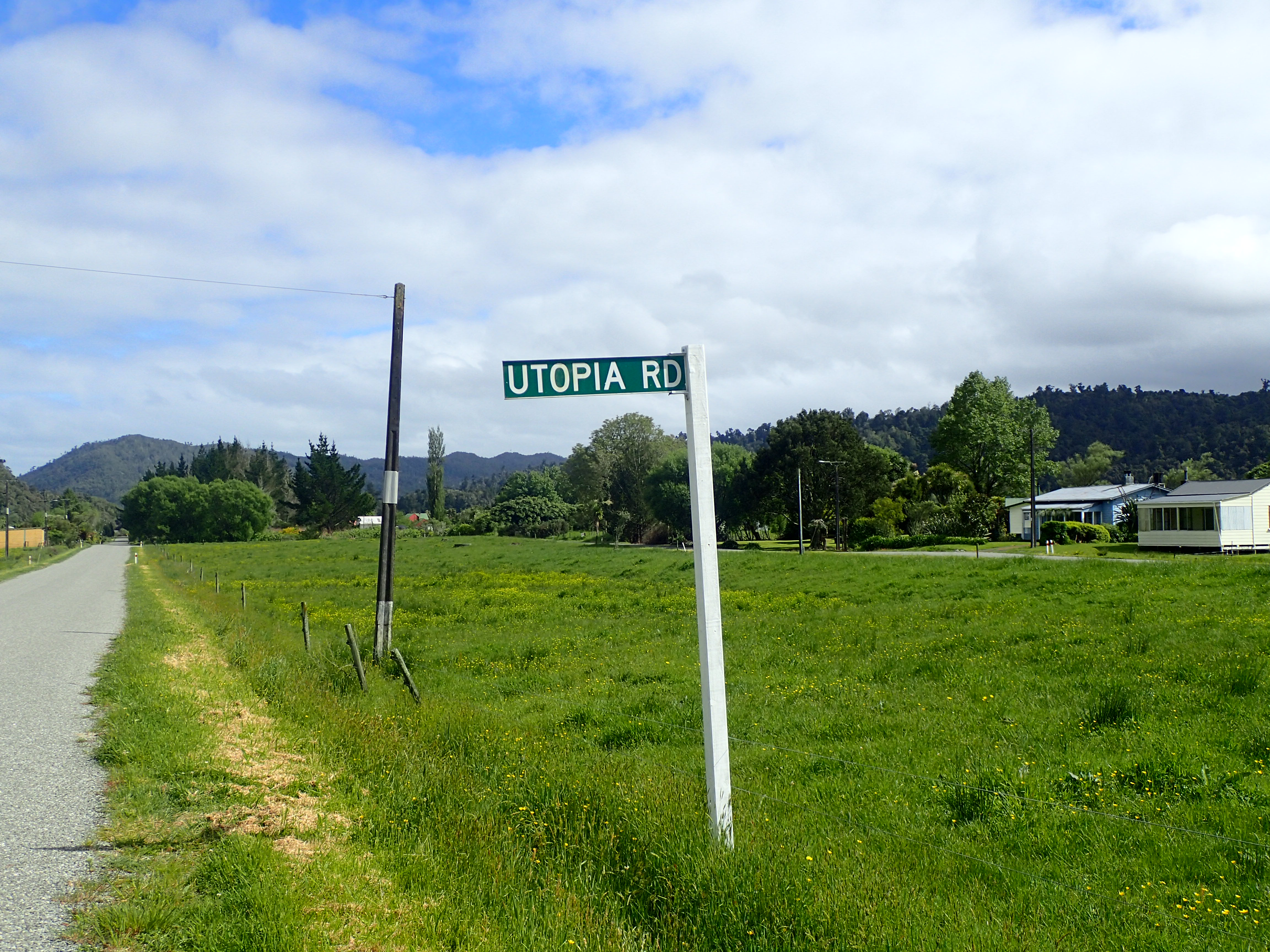
Road to Utopia – Seddonville

== History ==
Seddonville was named after Prime Minister of New Zealand Richard Seddon. It was established in the late 19th century as a mining community after the discovery of significant coal reserves in the area. Several mines nearby opened, with varying degrees of success, until the last one closed in 1986, due to having up to 6% sulphur in its coal.

Coal was first discovered in 1862, when the Nelson and Mokihinui Coal Mining Company Ltd was formed. However, dense bush made the seams hard to locate, so mining didn't begin until about 1869. By 1874 a short tramway had been built to the river and barges started taking the coal to the river mouth. A Wellington and Mokihinui Coal Mining Company was formed in 1877 and was exploring a seam by 1880, but didn't open the mine until 1885. In 1889 the company raised further money to develop the mine and arranged for the river bar to be dredged and a wharf built for use by the former Newcastle steam collier, Lawrence. She was wrecked on the bar in 1891 and remnants can still be seen on the beach.

A mine at Chasm Creek opened in 1892, the year before Dick Seddon opened the railway and his name was given to the village. One of the earliest state-owned mines opened in 1903, but was worked out by 1914. Charming Creek mine, between Seddonville and Ngakawau, opened in 1929, employed about 70 men, producing over 40,000 tonnes a year in the 1940s and closed in 1986. Its former railway now forms the Charming Creek walkway from Ngakawau.

On 23 February 1895, the last section of the Seddonville Branch railway from Westport was opened from Mokihinui to Seddonville and included an extension to the Mokihinui Coal Company's mine. Passengers were catered for by mixed trains; after 12 June 1933, they ceased to carry passengers past Seddonville, and on 14 October 1946 they were cancelled. Coal was the predominant traffic, especially after the late 1930s when increasingly developed roads allowed most other freight to be carried by road. In 1974, the Mokihinui Coal Company's mine closed, as did the railway beyond Seddonville. Coal from other mines provided some freight for the rest of the decade, but mining production was in decline and demand had dropped, and by 1980 the maintenance cost was well in excess of revenue. The railway closed beyond Ngakawau on 3 May 1981.

== Modern age ==
Seddonville is now a small rural village. It provides access to the Mokihinui back country and fishing, tramping, and whitewater rafting attract visitors. The gates to Seddonville Domain form a small war memorial, commemorating 18 men from Seddonville: 13 in World War I and five in World War II. Seddonville houses the H. E. Holland Memorial Library, which was named in honour of local MP and first leader of the Labour Party, Harry Holland, who made a public appeal to replace the collection after the first library was destroyed by flooding in 1929.

Part of the route of the railway is preserved as the Chasm Creek Walkway. On the approach to Seddonville, it follows the formation of the line, passes through a tunnel and over two railway bridges. The platform of Seddonville railway station is still extant in the village. The Old Ghost Road, a mountain biking and walking track, finishes in Seddonville.

Demographics for the area are covered at Mokihinui.
