= Stockton, New Zealand =

Stockton
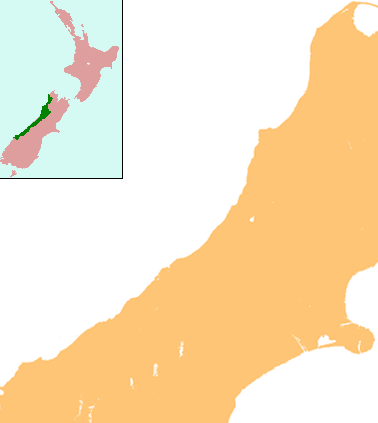
- Coordinates: 41°37′51″S 171°54′2″E
- Country: New Zealand
- Region: West Coast
- District: Buller District
- Electorates: West Coast-Tasman; Te Tai Tonga

Stockton is a former settlement in the northwestern South Island of New Zealand in the West Coast region. It is located in the Papahaua Ranges about 30 kilometres linear distance north east from Westport.

Stockton is best known for the Stockton Mine operated by Solid Energy. This mine had the first electric railway in New Zealand, from 1908 to 1953, when it was replaced by an aerial cableway.

Demographics for the area are covered at Millerton.
