= Hector and Ngakawau =

Town on the West Coast of the South Island of New Zealand

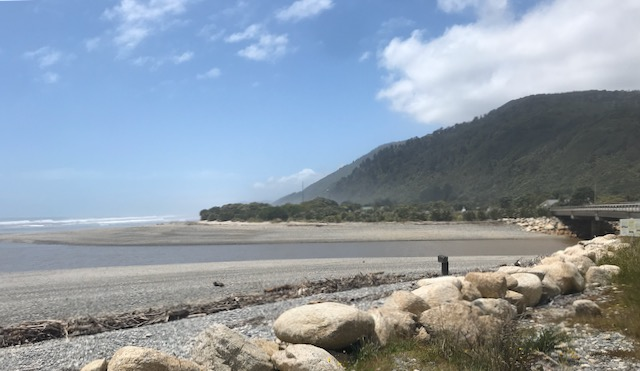
- Ngākawau River mouth
- Interactive map of Hector and Ngakawau
- Coordinates: 41°36′23″S 171°52′50″E
- Country: New Zealand
- Region: West Coast
- District: Buller District
- Ward: Seddon
- Electorates: West Coast-Tasman; Te Tai Tonga

Government
  - Territorial Authority: Buller District Council
  - Regional council: West Coast Regional Council
  - Mayor of Buller: Chris Russell
  - West Coast-Tasman MP: Maureen Pugh
  - Te Tai Tonga MP: Tākuta Ferris

Area
  - Total: 2.53 km^{2} (0.98 sq mi)

Population (June 2025)
  - Total: 220
  - Density: 87/km^{2} (230/sq mi)

Hector and Ngakawau are two lightly populated settlements located at the mouth of the Ngākawau River in the West Coast region of New Zealand. Both settlements are situated on State Highway 67 between Westport and Karamea. Despite a low population, many of the workers at New Zealand's largest open-cut coal mine at Stockton choose to live at these places and shuttles frequently operate between the two places.

== Hector ==
Hector sits on the northern side of the Ngākawau River's mouth, and is the more populous of the two settlements.

Hector has adopted the endangered Hector's dolphin as a town icon and is involved in Department of Conservation projects to protect the dolphin. The dolphins often play just offshore from Hector and attract visitors. Another local attraction is a country music museum.

== Ngakawau ==
Ngakawau, the more economically important of the two settlements, stands on the southern side of the mouth of the Ngākawau River.

As of 2015 Ngakawau serves as the terminus of the Ngakawau Branch railway. An aerial ropeway from the Stockton Mine transports significant tonnages of coal to Ngakawau for trans-shipment to the port town of Lyttelton on the east coast of New Zealand. The line from Westport to Ngakawau opened on 12 September 1877, and an extension northward across the river through Hector to Mokihinui opened on 8 August 1893. The line ultimately extended to Seddonville on 23 February 1895 and became known as the Seddonville Branch. Passenger services through both settlements were provided by mixed trains; they ceased to operate from 14 October 1946. Coal was almost the sole traffic from that stage, and as output from mines to the north declined, the line's maintenance costs outweighed revenue and the section north of Ngakawau closed.

== Demographics ==
Ngākawau is described by Stats NZ as a rural settlement and covers 2.53 km^{2} (0.98 sq mi), including Hector. Hector and Ngākawau had an estimated population of 220 as of June 2025, with a population density of 87 people per km^{2}. It is part of the larger Buller Coalfields statistical area.

Historical population
| Year | Pop. | ±% p.a. |
|---|---|---|
| 2006 | 231 | — |
| 2013 | 219 | −0.76% |
| 2018 | 201 | −1.70% |
| 2023 | 225 | +2.28% |

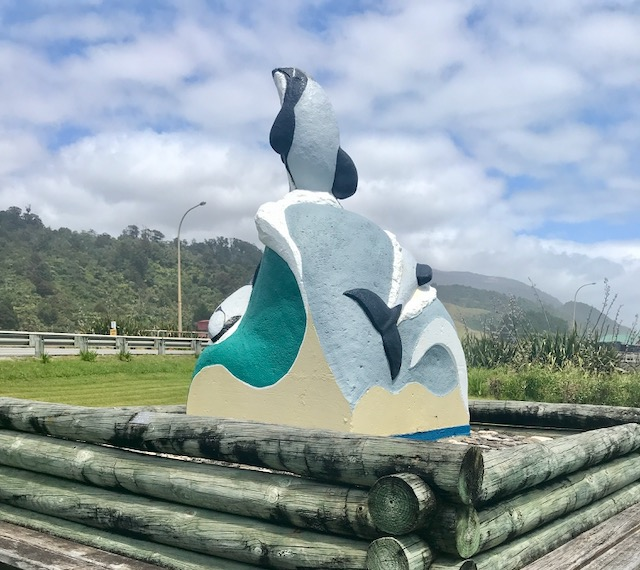
Hector's Dolphins statue in Hector

Hector and Ngākawau had a population of 225 in the 2023 New Zealand census, an increase of 24 people (11.9%) since the 2018 census, and an increase of 6 people (2.7%) since the 2013 census. There were 117 males, 108 females, and 3 people of other genders in 126 dwellings. 5.3% of people identified as LGBTIQ+. The median age was 61.1 years (compared with 38.1 years nationally). There were 15 people (6.7%) aged under 15 years, 12 (5.3%) aged 15 to 29, 120 (53.3%) aged 30 to 64, and 78 (34.7%) aged 65 or older.

People could identify as more than one ethnicity. The results were 92.0% European (Pākehā), 12.0% Māori, 1.3% Pasifika, 1.3% Asian, and 2.7% other, which includes people giving their ethnicity as "New Zealander". English was spoken by 100.0%, Māori by 1.3%, and other languages by 2.7%. No language could be spoken by 1.3% (e.g. too young to talk). The percentage of people born overseas was 16.0, compared with 28.8% nationally.

Religious affiliations were 22.7% Christian, 1.3% Māori religious beliefs, and 4.0% other religions. People who answered that they had no religion were 64.0%, and 12.0% of people did not answer the census question.

Of those at least 15 years old, 21 (10.0%) people had a bachelor's or higher degree, 96 (45.7%) had a post-high school certificate or diploma, and 93 (44.3%) people exclusively held high school qualifications. The median income was $23,900, compared with $41,500 nationally. 3 people (1.4%) earned over $100,000 compared to 12.1% nationally. The employment status of those at least 15 was 57 (27.1%) full-time, 27 (12.9%) part-time, and 6 (2.9%) unemployed.

== Notes and references ==
=== References ===
- Churchman, Geoffrey B; Hurst, Tony (2001) [1990, 1991]. The Railways of New Zealand: A Journey through History (Second ed.). Transpress New Zealand. ISBN 0-908876-20-3.
