= Buller Declaration =

Petition in New Zealand

The Buller Declaration is a petition calling upon the New Zealand Government to address the quality of the country's health system and services. It was launched on 28 September 2024 by Malcolm Mulholland, the chairperson of Patient Voice Aotearoa, who subsequently travelled around the South Island to gather signatures. Notable signatories have included the Mayor of Buller and representatives from several medical professional bodies including the New Zealand Nurses Organisation, the Association of Salaried Medical Specialists, the Rural Health Network, and the Royal New Zealand College of General Practitioners. The campaign began with a silent march in the Buller District town of Westport on 28 September to oppose proposed cuts to regional health services. By mid October 2024, the Buller Declaration had attracted about 4,000 signatures following a roadshow tour in other South Island centres including Dunedin, Oamaru, Timaru, Ashburton and Christchurch.

== Text ==
The Buller Declaration on the State of the New Zealand health system consists of the following text:

As signatories to this declaration, we assert:

- Aotearoa New Zealand's health system is in a state of crisis.
- The Government must act urgently to address that crisis.
- Rural, Māori, and low-income populations are disproportionately impacted by the crisis.
- The Government must act urgently to meet its obligations under Te Tiriti o Waitangi and protect Māori health, in consultation with iwi (tribes) and hapū (sub-groups).
- The Government must allocate additional resources to train, recruit and retain more nurses, doctors and specialists.

== History ==
=== Launch ===
On 28 September 2024, Patient Voice Aotearoa And Buller Health Action Group organised a march in Westport to protest the poor quality of health services in the West Coast Region. Key grievances included the closure of Buller Hospital for almost a month after a new facility opened in May 2023; ambulance service Hato Hone St John having only one ambulance in the region; the region only having one air rescue helicopter based in Greymouth which cannot fly in adverse weather conditions; and the closure of all urgent and after-hours clinics in the West Coast from 28 September in favour of telehealth services. While Buller's new hospital Te Rau Kawakawa had opened in Westport May 2023, it had been closed intermittently due to staffing shortages. The nearest hospital is Te Nikau Greymouth Hospital, which lies 100km away from Westport.

During the protest march, the Buller Declaration was signed at the Westport Clock Tower by Patience Voice Aotearoa chair Malcolm Mulholland, Anita Halsall-Quinlan, Buller Health Action Group spokesperson Anita Halsall Quinlan, New Zealand Nurses Organisation (NZNO) Kaiwhakahaere (leader) Kerri Nuku, Royal New Zealand College of General Practitioners (RNZCGP) representative Andrew Laurenson, Association of Salaried Medical Specialists (ASMA) Executive Director Sarah Dalton and Hauora Taiwhenua Rural Health Network representative Jeremy Webber. The protest march in Westport was attended by 2,000 people including Mayor of Buller Jamie Cleine, who said the community was protesting against the closure of after-hours general practitioner services in the region. It coincided with a similar protest in Dunedin against the Sixth National Government's planned cuts to the rebuilding of Dunedin Hospital.

=== 2024 ===
The organisers of the Buller Declaration announced plans to hold public signing events in several South Island urban centres including Invercargill, Dunedin, Oamaru, Timaru, Ashburton, Christchurch, Kaikōura, and Blenheim.

On 5 October, the Buller Declaration was circulated in Reefton where hundreds of residents gathered to protest the closure of the town's aged residential care facility, which closed in 2023. Patient advocate Anita Halsall-Quinlan also confirmed plans to present the petition to the New Zealand Parliament.

On 9 October, Mulholland brought the Buller Declaration for a public signing event at the Dunedin City Library, which was attended by representatives of the NZNZO, Dunedin Dunedin city councillors and staff, and Labour Member of Parliament for Taieri Ingrid Leary. Mulholland said he had collected tens of thousands of signatures by the time.

By 11 October, the Buller Declaration had reached Blenheim. According to Mulholland, the petition had received 4,000 signatures by that time, with plans for further signing events in Nelson, Greymouth, Hokitika and the North Island. A public signing event was held at Rangitane House in central Blenheim, which was signed by local NZNO representative Isla Taunoa and Mayor of Marlborough Nadine Taylor.

By 13 October, Patient Voice Aotearoa had brought the petition to Oamaru. Mayor of Waitaki Gary Kircher expressed support for the Buller Declaration and encouraged locals to sign it. Kircher also welcomed the petition being brought to other Waitaki District towns including Kurow and Palmerston.

=== 2025 ===
In March, Patient Voice Aotearoa launched its tour of the North Island to raise signatures for the Buller Declaration, with its first stop being Porirua on 4 March. On 13 March, the Masterton Library became the fourth stop for the Buller Declaration, attracting 100 people including health professionals. On 23 March, the Buller Declaration was circulated in Napier during a local protest against government cutbacks to urgent healthcare services, that was attended by about 300 people.

By late April, Mulholland had spoken to over 30 communities during his nationwide tour, in which the Buller Declaration was circulated. On 1 May, he spoke to a public meeting at Gisborne's House of Breakthrough, where the petition was also circulated. On 9 July, the Buller Declaration arrived in Gore where it was hosted by Gore Health.

By late October, the Buller Declaration had been delivered to over 20 locations since its relaunch in March 2025. On 24 October, the Declaration had reached Masterton with former Mayor of Masterton Lyn Patterson helping to promote the petition. 400 people signed the petition. A national hikoi carrying the Buller Declaration departed Westport on 1 November and arrived in Masterton on 6 November, with the goal of reaching the New Zealand Parliament on 18 November. On 3 November, Mulhholland organised a 200-metre long demonstration outside the University of Otago's Dentistry School to promote awareness of the petition campaign.

By 14 November, over 100,000 New Zealanders had signed the Buller Declaration. That same day, a hikoi led by Lady Tureiti Moxon, the Managing Director of Te Kōhao Health, marched from Hamilton's Lake Playground to Waikato Hospital. On 18 November, Mulholland led a procession of marchers carrying the petition to Parliament, where it was accepted by Members of Parliament from the Labour, Green and ACT parties. The petition weighed about 200 kg, stretched 276 meters long and contained between 85,000 and 90,000 signatures.
