= Carters Beach =

Town on the West Coast of the South Island of New Zealand

- Coastal settlement
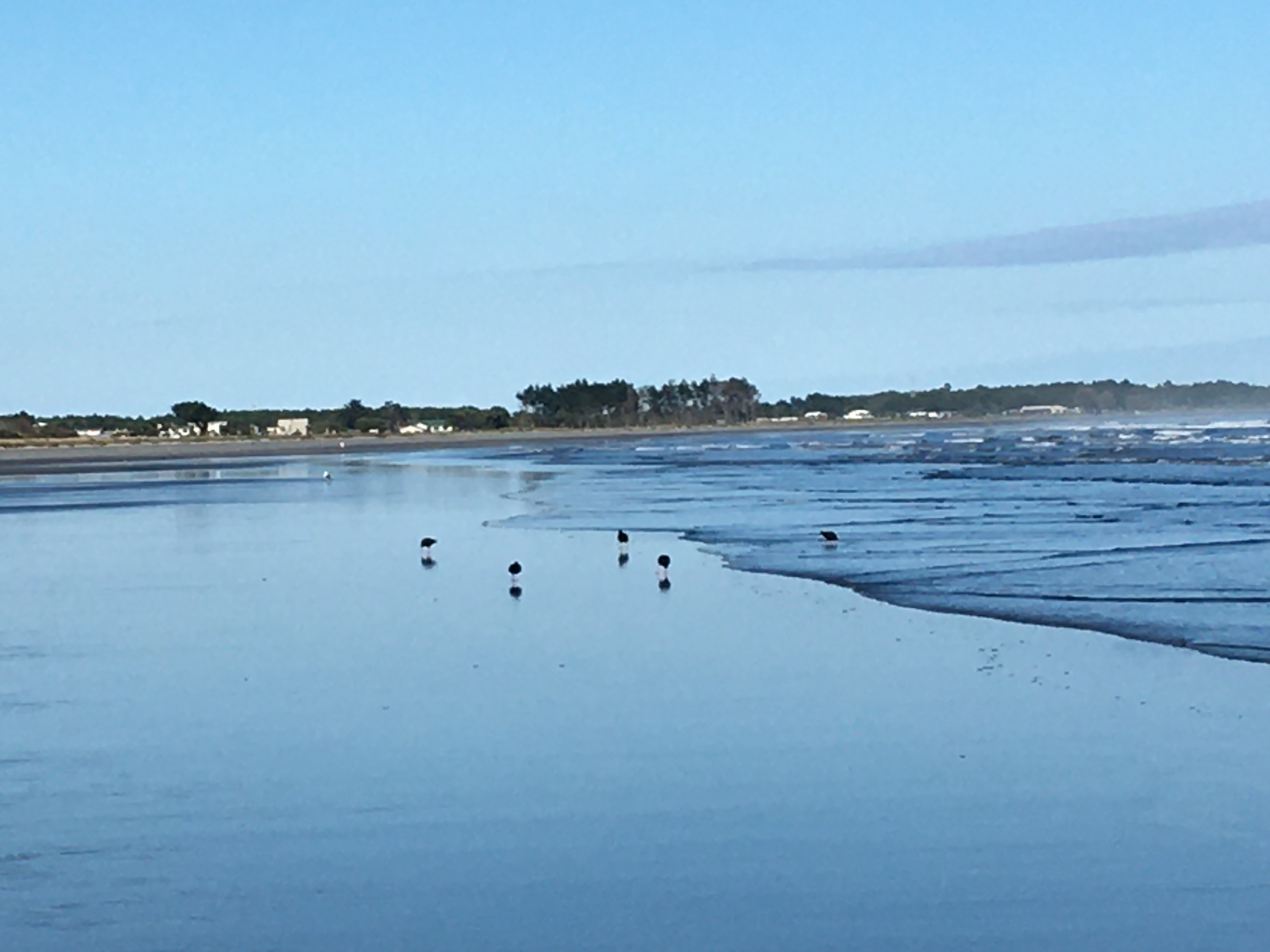
- Carters Beach at low tide
- Interactive map of Carters Beach
- Coordinates: 41°44′52.8″S 171°33′43.2″E
- Country: New Zealand
- Region: West Coast
- District: Buller District
- Ward: Westport
- Electorates: West Coast-Tasman; Te Tai Tonga

Government
  - Territorial Authority: Buller District Council
  - Regional council: West Coast Regional Council
  - Mayor of Buller: Chris Russell
  - West Coast-Tasman MP: Maureen Pugh
  - Te Tai Tonga MP: Tākuta Ferris

Area
  - Total: 0.59 km^{2} (0.23 sq mi)

Population (June 2025)
  - Total: 340
  - Density: 580/km^{2} (1,500/sq mi)

Carters Beach is a suburb of Westport on the West Coast of New Zealand's South Island. Located 6 kilometres (4 mi) west of Westport on State Highway 67A, it offers a pristine sheltered sandy beach on the West Coast suitable for swimming. From the Buller River jetty at the east end of Carters Beach, west to Cape Foulwind, the beach runs for more than 9 uninterrupted kilometres.

Carters Beach is occasionally used by naturists for nude sunbathing. New Zealand has no official nude beaches, as public nudity is legal on any beach where it is "known to occur".

The Kawatiri Coastal Trail is a 40 km walking and cycling path which connects Westport to Carters Beach, and continues south to Charleston. In Carters Beach, it passes through wetlands, past the golf course, and through the domain (public park) as it winds its way south. It opened on 22 March 2025.

An 18-hole golf course and Westport Airport are located near the town. Erosion along Rotary Road in 2018 resulted in the closure of the beachside road and threatened the possible closure of the nearby airport. However, in 2020 the road along the beach to the west side of the Buller River mouth was rebuilt as a bike and pedestrian path. Granite rock has been piled along the beach to prevent further erosion and impact to the airport.

The town offers accommodations and a restaurant.

Carters Beach was named after an early settler who farmed the area in the late 1800s.

== Demographics ==
Carters Beach is described by Stats NZ as a rural settlement, which covers 0.59 km^{2} (0.23 sq mi). It had an estimated population of 340 as of June 2025, with a population density of 576 people per km^{2}. It is part of the larger Westport Rural statistical area.

Historical population
Year	Pop.	±% p.a.
2006	294	—
2013	339	+2.06%
2018	330	−0.54%
2023	357	+1.59%

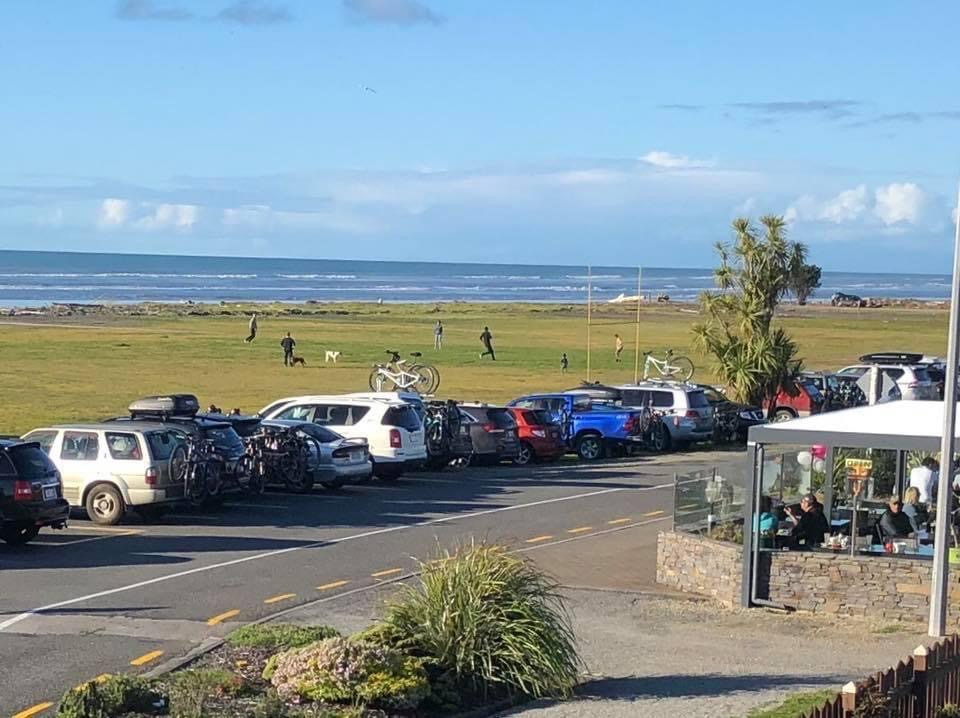
Carters Beach Domain looking northeast

Carters Beach had a population of 357 in the 2023 New Zealand census, an increase of 27 people (8.2%) since the 2018 census, and an increase of 18 people (5.3%) since the 2013 census. There were 183 males and 174 females in 171 dwellings. 2.5% of people identified as LGBTIQ+. The median age was 50.4 years (compared with 38.1 years nationally). There were 57 people (16.0%) aged under 15 years, 39 (10.9%) aged 15 to 29, 171 (47.9%) aged 30 to 64, and 87 (24.4%) aged 65 or older.

People could identify as more than one ethnicity. The results were 92.4% European (Pākehā); 13.4% Māori; 0.8% Pasifika; 0.8% Middle Eastern, Latin American and African New Zealanders (MELAA); and 1.7% other, which includes people giving their ethnicity as "New Zealander". English was spoken by 97.5%, Māori by 3.4%, and other languages by 3.4%. No language could be spoken by 1.7% (e.g. too young to talk). New Zealand Sign Language was known by 0.8%. The percentage of people born overseas was 12.6, compared with 28.8% nationally.

Religious affiliations were 28.6% Christian, 0.8% Islam, and 0.8% New Age. People who answered that they had no religion were 58.8%, and 10.1% of people did not answer the census question.

Of those at least 15 years old, 48 (16.0%) people had a bachelor's or higher degree, 168 (56.0%) had a post-high school certificate or diploma, and 84 (28.0%) people exclusively held high school qualifications. The median income was $31,000, compared with $41,500 nationally. 24 people (8.0%) earned over $100,000 compared to 12.1% nationally. The employment status of those at least 15 was 126 (42.0%) full-time, 48 (16.0%) part-time, and 9 (3.0%) unemployed.
