= Clock Tower Chambers =

Municipal building in New Zealand

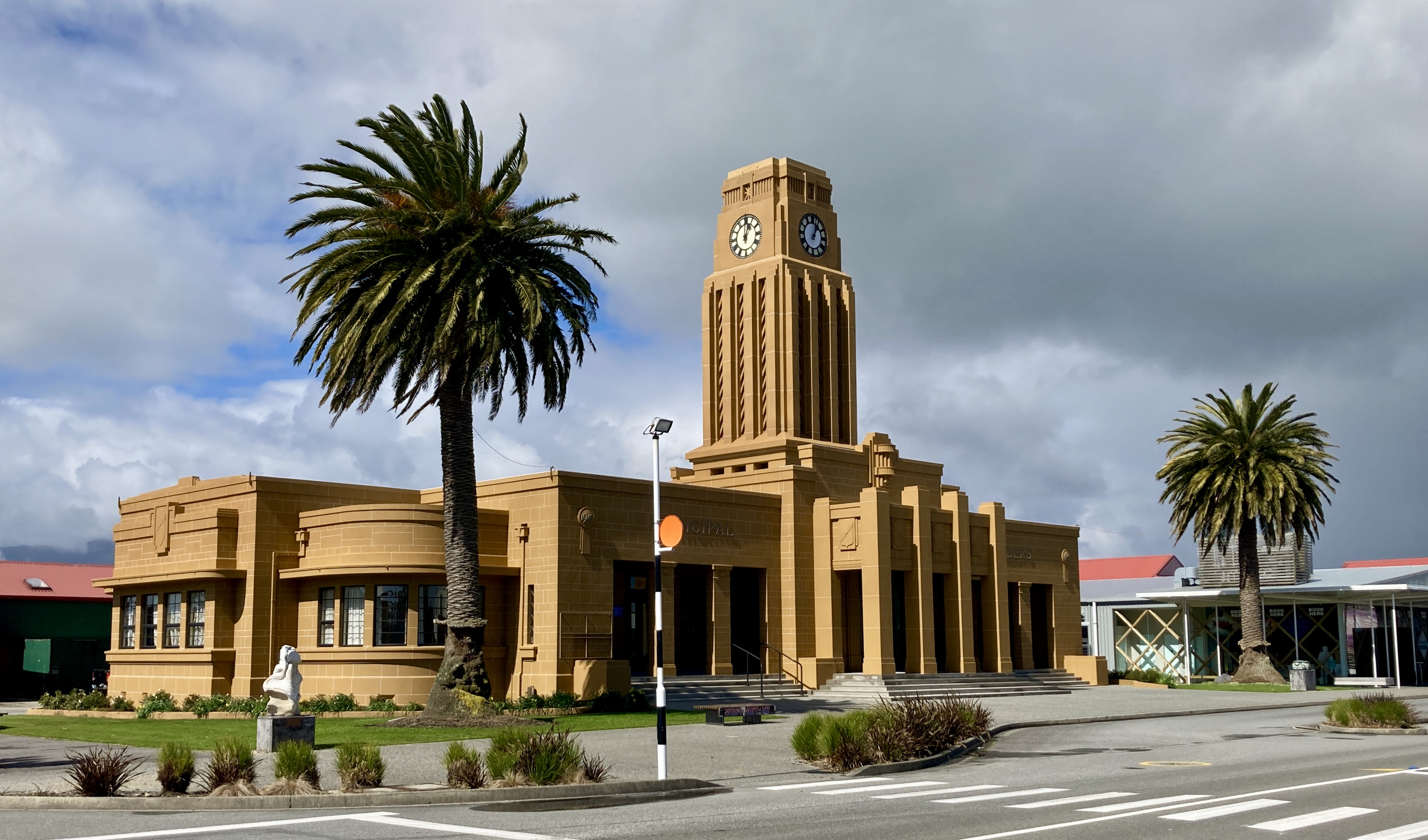
- Clock Tower Chambers
- Interactive map of the Clock Tower Chambers area
- Alternative names: Westport Municipal Chambers

General information
- Architectural style: Moderne architecture
- Location: 119 Palmerston Street, Westport, New Zealand
- Coordinates: 41°45′13″S 171°35′55″E
- Construction started: 1938
- Completed: 1941
- Inaugurated: n/a
- Client: Westport Borough Council

Technical details
- Structural system: Reinforced concrete

Design and construction
- Architect: Archibald Macdonald

Heritage New Zealand – Category 1
- Designated: 30 August 1990
- Reference no.: 5000

The Clock Tower Chambers, also known as the Westport Municipal Chambers, are the former municipal offices in Westport, New Zealand. Built during World War II, the building has been described as "possibly the jewel in the crown of West Coast historic buildings". It has a Category I registration with Heritage New Zealand.

== Background ==
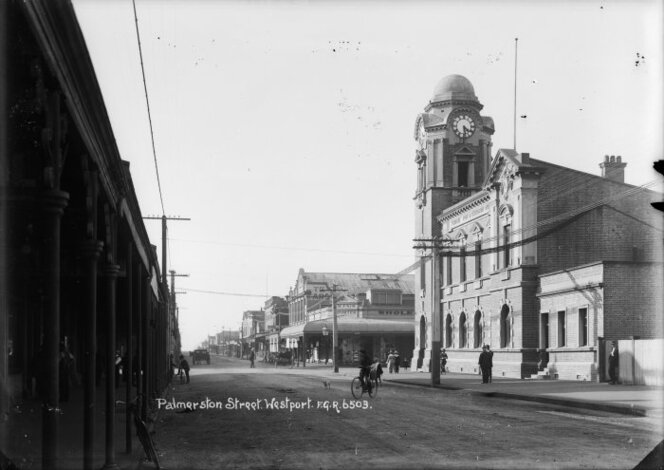
Westport Post Office in 1916 including the 1913 Seddon Memorial Clock

Westport was the first town on the West Coast to be settled by Europeans. It became an important centre after the discovery of coal, and Westport was both the administrative center for Westport Borough (from 1873) and Buller County (from 1877). The chief post office was an imposing structure, with a clock tower added in 1913 as a memorial to the former prime minister and West Coast personality Richard Seddon. The tower collapsed in the 1929 Murchison earthquake and the building was demolished soon after.

Jack Kilkenny (1888–1972), mayor of Westport from 1933 until his resignation in 1939, proposed in 1936 that Westport Borough Council build municipal chambers including a clock tower to replace the tower that was lost in the 1929 earthquake. The borough council approved an NZ£8,000 loan towards the construction, professional fees, and the purchase of an adjacent section.

== Construction ==
Archibald Macdonald, a local architect in Westport, was engaged for the design of the municipal chambers. Macdonald chose the Moderne architecture style for his design. The construction contract was tendered in August 1938 but as the tender prices were considered too high, the building was constructed using day labour instead. By December 1938, the previous council offices on the corner of Palmerston and Lyndhurst streets had been demolished and the site cleared for foundation work. The new council chambers were built in reinforced concrete, with interior work in rimu and terrazzo floors. Rising construction costs caused by the outbreak of World War II caused delays and financial problems. The building was complete, apart from the upper part of the clock tower, by April 1940. The finishing touches were done during 1941. The former proprietor of the local cinema, Harry Morgan, donated the clock. The building is coated in Motueka sand, which gives it a distinctive mustard colour. There were plans to add a town hall behind the building and for that reason there was never an official opening party held. The building cost NZ£18,423 and the donated clock was worth NZ£1,250.

The economic depression during the war prevented the town hall plan from going ahead. There was a fundraising attempt during the 1960s, with a "hall-o-meter" displaying progress, but this did not reach its goal.

== Heritage registration ==
On 30 August 1990, the building was registered by the New Zealand Historic Places Trust (since renamed Heritage New Zealand) as a Category I structure, with registration number 5000. Reasons for this registration were the historical significance of the building (demonstrating the status of the town), the architectural quality (it is described as a "striking building with a dramatic appearance"), and its townscape / landmark value (it is the most prominent landmark in Westport).

== Current use ==
Westport Borough was merged into Buller District in the 1989 local government reforms. Buller District Council vacated the Clock Tower Chambers soon after the building had been registered by the Historic Places Trust. Commercial tenants now occupy the building.

== See also ==
- List of historic places in Buller District
