= Jamie Cleine =

New Zealand politician and former mayor

His Worship Jamie Cleine
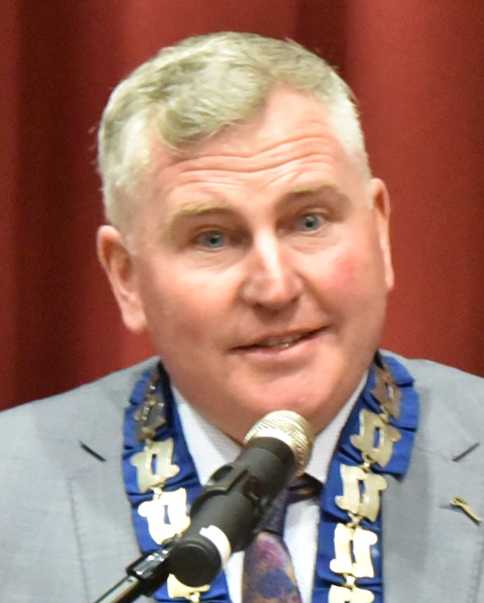

5th Mayor of Buller
- In office 2019–2025
- Preceded by: Garry Howard
- Succeeded by: Chris Russell

Personal details
- Occupation: Farmer

Jamie Cleine is a New Zealand politician who served as Mayor of Buller between 2019 and 2025. During the 2026 New Zealand general election, he stood as a candidate for New Zealand First.

== Professional career ==
Cleine worked as a dairy and livestock farmer for 26 years in the Buller District.

== Mayoral career ==
During the 2019 New Zealand local elections, Cleine was elected as Mayor of Buller. In 2022, Cleine alleged that Westport accountant Frank Dooley assaulted the-then Deputy Mayor Sharon Roche during a public meeting in Westport in February 2022. Dooley subsequently sued Cleine for defamation, with the case being heard by the Westport District court in October 2024. Despite being friends growing up, relations between Cleine and Dooley had deteriorated after the latter criticised the Buller District Council's response to floods which devastated Westport in July 2021 and 2022. On 18 November 2024, Judge Kevin Kelly dismissed Dooley's defamation case against Cleine, finding that the former most likely raised his fist during the meeting in an "aggressive and threatening fashion."

As Mayor of Buller, Cleine supported boosting immigration to the Buller District to counter population decline and supported mining as a source of revenue for the District Council. He was also involved in the development of the "Resilient Westport" plan which proposed protecting Westport from the Buller River with stopbanks and walls, and ensuring that future housing growth in the town was not located in flood-prone areas. The Resilient Westport project also involved a program to subsidise moving existing housing from the floodplain to higher ground. During the 2025 New Zealand local elections, Cleine ran for a third term as Mayor of Buller but was defeated by Chris Russell.

== New Zealand First ==
On 29 March 2026, New Zealand First announced that Cleine would be standing as the party's West Coast-Tasman candidate in the 2026 New Zealand general election scheduled for 7 November. Cleine's selection accompanied two campaign pledges to invest half of the West Coast Region's mining royalties into targeted local infrastructure and housing investments, and to curb the regulatory powers of the Department of Conservation. In May 2026, Cleine proposed that banks pay for helping regions to become "climate resilient" and suggested that mining revenue could also help fund climate resilience projects.

In mid-August 2026, he told a West Coast Regional Council candidate briefing that NZ First supported using the International Visitor Levy (IVL) for tourism to fund local infrastructure development. However, he declined to elaborate his party's policy on funding local councils to deal with the National-led coalition government's amalgamation policies. On 7 October 2026, Cleine was ranked 14th place on New Zealand First's party list.

During the 2026 general election held on 7 November, Cleine came third place with 4,077 votes during the West-Coast Tasman race based on preliminary results; with National Party candidate Katie Milne and Labour Party candidate Rory William Patterson come first and second place respectively. He also failed to enter the New Zealand Parliament via the party list based on preliminary results.

== Community involvement ==
Cleine is a member of the Buller Resilience Trust, a community grant agency that is funded by the coal mining company Bathurst Resources, which operates the Stockton Mine, New Zealand's largest coal mining operation.
