= List of historic places in Buller District =

This list of Heritage New Zealand-listed places in Buller District contains those buildings and structures that are listed with Heritage New Zealand (formerly known as Historic Places Trust) in Buller District, New Zealand.

Heritage New Zealand is a Crown entity and the national heritage agency. With a head office in Wellington, the Christchurch area office is responsible for the Grey District.

Image	Item	Description	Location	Street address	Built	Date listed	Heritage category
	Clock Tower Chambers	municipal building in New Zealand	Westport	119 Palmerston Street and 8 Lyndhurst Street, Westport 7825	1941	30 August 1990	NZHPT Category I listing
	House	75 Queen Street and Wakefield Street, Westport	Westport	75 Queen Street and Wakefield Street, Westport		30 August 1990	NZHPT Category I listing
	Westport Public Library	former library in New Zealand	Westport	Lyndhurst Street, Westport	1904	21 September 1989	NZHPT Category II listing
	The Stone House	historic house in Westport, New Zealand	Westport	108 Derby Street, Westport 7825	1911	22 June 1994	NZHPT Category II listing
	Westport Post Office	post office in New Zealand	Westport	155 Palmerston Street and Brougham Street, Westport		21 September 1989	NZHPT Category II listing
	Utopia Lodge	historic hostel/hotel in Westport, New Zealand	Westport	72 Queen Street, Westport 7825		21 September 1989	NZHPT Category II listing
	O'Connor Home	resthome and historic place in Westport, New Zealand	Westport	190 Queen Street, Westport 7825	1918	21 September 1989	NZHPT Category II listing
	Masonic Lodge Hall	masonic temple in Westport, New Zealand	Westport	51 Russell Street, Westport	1907	21 September 1989	NZHPT Category II listing
	Gates of Remembrance	memorial gates in Westport, New Zealand	Westport	Russell Street and Brougham Street, Victoria Park, Westport	1920	21 September 1989	NZHPT Category II listing
	House	historic house in Westport, New Zealand (2)	Westport	51 Queen Street, Westport		21 September 1989	NZHPT Category II listing
	House	historic building in Westport, New Zealand (3)	Westport	32 Henley Street and Queen Street, Westport	1889	21 September 1989	NZHPT Category II listing
	House	historic house in Westport, New Zealand	Westport	55 Queen Street, Westport	1903	21 September 1989	NZHPT Category II listing
	Courthouse	courthouse in Westport, New Zealand	Westport	11 Wakefield Street, Westport 7825	1903	21 September 1989	NZHPT Category II listing
	Buller Field Station	historic building in New Zealand	Westport	40 Queen Street, Westport		21 September 1989	NZHPT Category II listing
	Westpac Bank building	building in Westport, New Zealand	Westport	143 Palmerston Street, Westport	1901	4 April 2008	NZHPT Category II listing
	Sacred Heart Church	church building in Reefton, New Zealand	Reefton	Church Street and Walsh Street, Reefton	1879	14 May 2008	NZHPT Category II listing
	Reefton Courthouse	former courthouse in Reefton, New Zealand	Reefton	47 Bridge Street, Reefton 7830	1872	27 August 1990	NZHPT Category I listing
	Reefton Masonic Hall	masonic hall in New Zealand	Reefton	38 Shiel Street, Reefton	1892	22 August 2008	NZHPT Category II listing
	St Stephen's Church	church building in Reefton, New Zealand	Reefton	16–18 Church Street and Walsh Street, Reefton	1888	22 August 2008	NZHPT Category II listing
	School of Mines	historic building in Reefton, New Zealand	Reefton	22 Shiel Street, Reefton	1887	30 August 1990	NZHPT Category I listing
	Reefton Oddfellows Hall	fraternal meeting hall in New Zealand	Reefton	56 Bridge Street, Reefton	1876	21 September 1989	NZHPT Category II listing
	Horse trough, Reefton	horse trough in New Zealand	Reefton	15 Shiel Street, Reefton		21 September 1989	NZHPT Category II listing
	Penington House	house in New Zealand	Reefton	15 Shiel Street, Reefton		21 September 1989	NZHPT Category II listing
	State Mine Store (Former)	heritage building in Granity, New Zealand	Granity	54–56 Back Road, Granity 7823		21 September 1989	NZHPT Category II listing
	Granity and District Fundraising Centre	historic building in New Zealand	Granity	98 Torea Street, Granity	1891	21 September 1989	NZHPT Category II listing
	Granity Community Library	subscription library in Granity, New Zealand	Granity	Torea Street, Granity	1903	21 September 1989	NZHPT Category II listing
	Griffiths Foundry Furnace (Former)	historic industrial site in Birchfield, New Zealand	Birchfield	459 Birchfield Road, Birchfield, Westport 7891	1898	21 September 1989	NZHPT Category II listing
