= Granity Community Library =

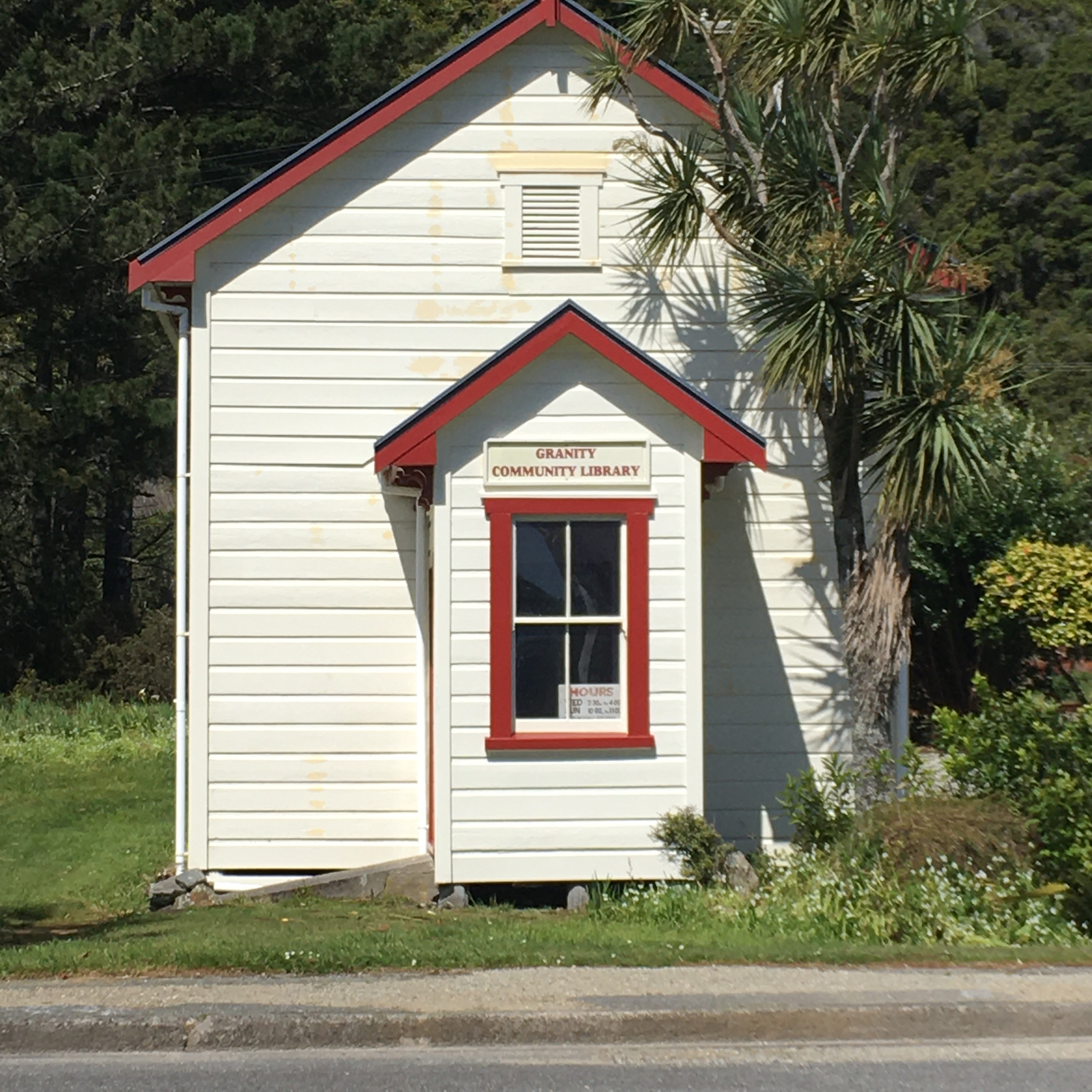

General information
- Type: Library
- Location: Granity, Torea Street (State Highway 67)
- Coordinates: 41°37′44″S 171°51′15″E
- Opened: 1903
- Owner

Heritage New Zealand – Category 2
- Designated: 21 September 1989
- Reference no.: 5019

Technical details
- Floor count: Single storey

Granity Community Library is a small public library located in the settlement of Granity on the West Coast of New Zealand. It is listed as a Category II historic place by Heritage New Zealand.

Granity was established as a depot for loading coal from the Millerton coal mine into railway trucks to go to Westport for shipping. In 1903 the Granity Library Committee approached the Minister of Railways for railway reserve land for a library building, and were granted a rectangular plot for five shillings a year. However, eight years after the library building had been erected it was discovered it was on the wrong site, and the lease had to be cancelled and a new one drawn up.

When the Westport Coal Company's engineering works were located in Granity, the company provided the library with free electric light. At its peak the library had 80 members, and in 1924 its contents were insured for £300. A local recalls the library at the time:

The layout of the library was very different in those days. Books were kept behind glass cases which were on the surrounding walls and down the middle of the library were two long trestles. These held the daily papers from all over the country and even Australia. Magazines and the Auckland Weekly News were regular features and miners were docked two and sixpence from their pay for the paper service. The library was open daily and a very busy community scene with people popping in just to scan the papers. The Librarian was on a small salary and was helped by young paid employees.

Books are provided by Buller District Library in Westport or received as donations from local residents. The staff are volunteers and the library is run by a committee. Over the years the library has been a meeting space for community groups such as the Countrywomen's Institute, the Silver Band, and the Rovers Rugby Club, a rehearsal space for the local drama club, and a venue for regular Forty-Fives card game evenings run by the Fire Brigade.

The building has been little changed since it was built, apart from losing a chimney in the 1968 Inangahua earthquake. In 2015 the library was featured in a BBC radio series on tiny libraries.

== See also ==
- List of historic places in Buller District
