= Inangahua County =

Former county of South Island, New Zealand (1876–1989)

Coordinates: 42°6′55″S 171°51′47″E

- County of New Zealand
- 1876–1989
- Capital: Reefton
- History
  - Established: 1876
  - Disestablished: 1989
- Today part of: Buller District

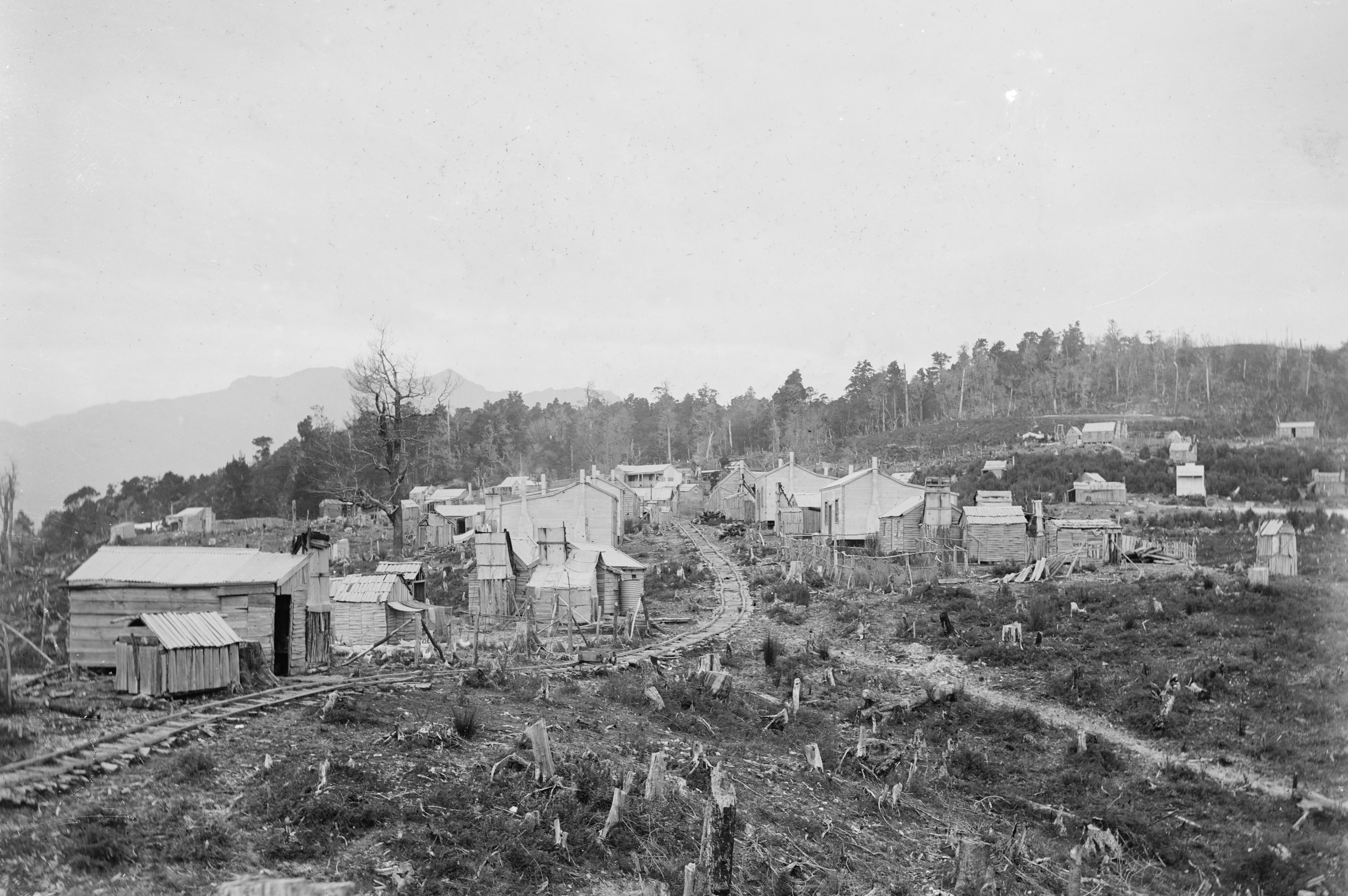
Cornish Town, also known as Cousin Jack Town, Inangahua County, 1910s

Inangahua County was one of the counties of New Zealand on the South Island.

During the period 1853 to 1876, the area that would become Inangahua County was administered as part of Nelson Province. With the Abolition of Provinces Act 1876, Inangahua County was created, taking over administration of its area in January 1877. The county council's administrative headquarters was located in Reefton.

Inangahua County existed until the 1989 local government reforms, when the Buller District was formed through the amalgamation of the Inangahua County, Buller County and Westport Borough administrative areas.
