= Thames School of Mines =

School of mines

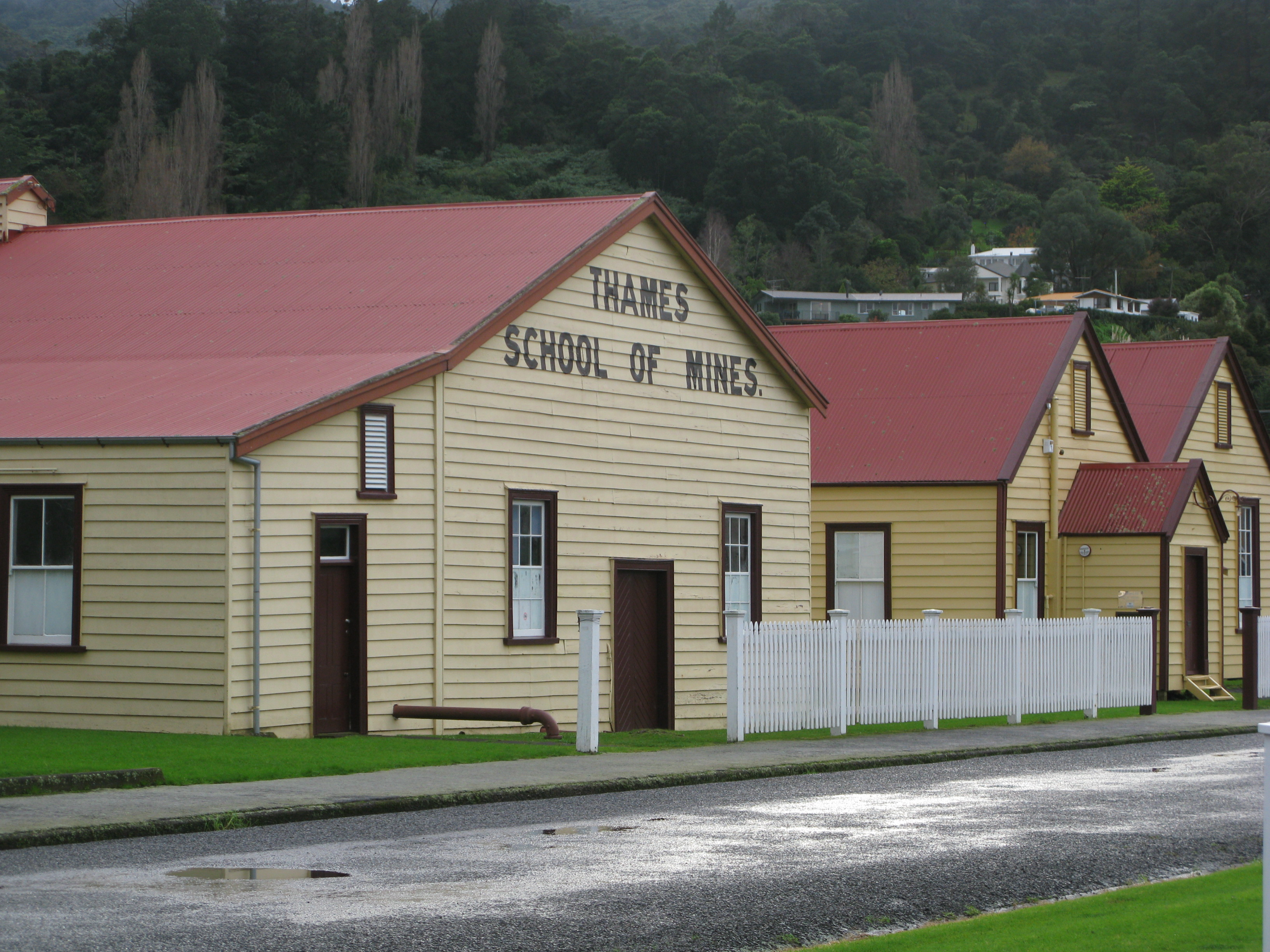

Location
- 101 Cochrane St; Thames, New Zealand; 37.1349°S 175.5376°E

Information
- Opened: 1886
- Closed: 1954

The Thames School of Mines is a nationally significant former school of mining in Thames, New Zealand. It is listed as a Category 1 historic building by Heritage New Zealand.

== Purpose ==
As stated in the 1901 Syllabus, the Thames School of Mines taught various subjects. The bulk of which directly related to mining. The subjects included: Mathematics, Mining and Applied mechanics, Practical Assaying and Ventilation and Explosives, along with others.

In addition to the teaching of these subjects the school was also used to prepare candidates for the Government certifications of Mine Manager, Battery Superintendent, Engine Driver and Licensed Assayer. The syllabus also states that the exhibition of mineral and geological samples, as well as the assaying and analysis of ore sample as being within the scope of the Thames School of Mines.

The school and its students also conducted experimental research on subjects, such as the refining of the gold extraction process.

== Buildings ==
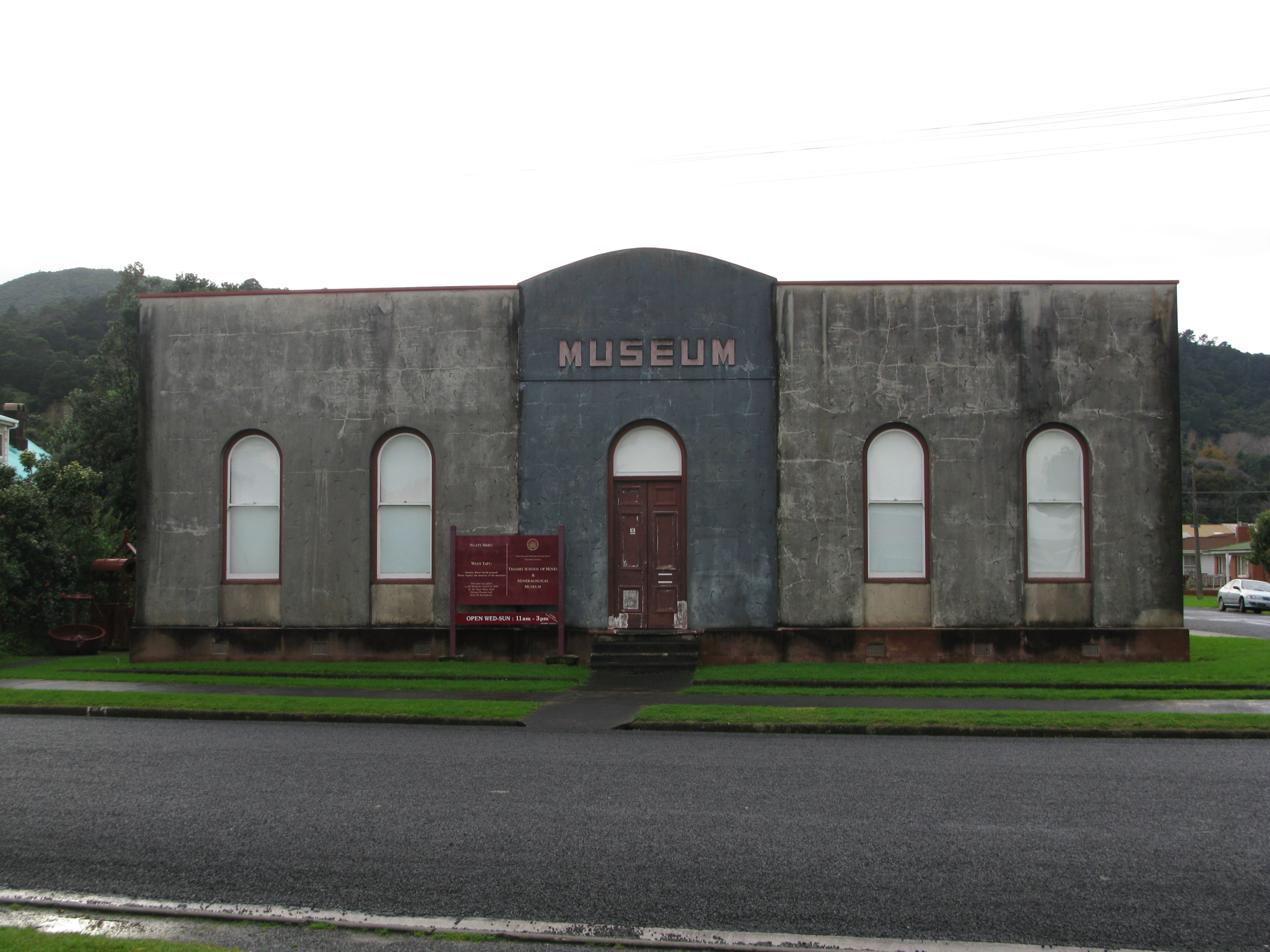
The mineralogical museum is a significant part of the complex.

It is on the urupa (resting place/burial ground) of Aparangi. It is of particular importance to Ngati Maru Paraone and Te Huiraukura, who gifted the tapu land solely for religious purposes. Ngāti Maru opposed the idea of a primary school on this site, however there was a transition from religious instruction when the school of mines opened in 1886. In addition to the School of Mines, several buildings were built within the complex and the surrounding area such as a church and Sunday School in 1869 and a mineralogical museum that opened in 1901.

== Post-operation ==
As gold mining declined, the school broadened its curriculum to include electrical and engineering subjects. After the Martha Mine closed, the school was no longer viable and closed in 1954. In 1979, the New Zealand Historic Places Trust acquired the complex for historic preservation. It is listed as a Category 1 historic place. It is one of only two known surviving examples of nineteenth century mining school complexes in New Zealand. Currently, no New Zealand universities offer a mining degree. In 2012, over seven hundred people signed a petition available at the site to save the Kopu Bridge and it was reported that the site had been broken into and damaged.

From 2006-2016 the School ran annual paint-making and painting workshops. The project was initiated by Anna Winstanley who brought the first Thames South School pupils to the museum. She engaged artist and film maker Barry Thomas who had exhibited his earth pigment based art in Coromandel Town. Participants ground clays into powder then PVA, linseed oil or egg binder was added to make paint. Sketches were drawn then painted onto raw paper pulp card (from the Kawerau Pulp Mill). All paintings were finally exhibited in various locations around the town. Curator and Museum Manager John Isdale managed the project which grew over the years to include high schools, adults workshops, an outreach project to Waihi College and the project was the subject of a Radio New Zealand Spectrum Programme. Isdale and Thomas subsequently ran all the following workshops when Winstanley returned to the UK in 2007.

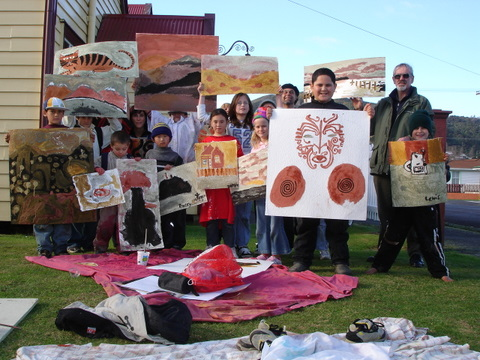

== Notable alumni ==
- Charles Arthur Banks, 17th Lieutenant Governor of British Columbia (1946–1950)
- Bob Heffron, 30th Premier of New South Wales (1959–1964)
- John Alexander Agnew, Chairman of Consolidated Gold Fields

== See also ==
- Reefton School of Mines
- Coromandel Gold Rushes
- Film on the Paint Making and painting workshops https://www.youtube.com/watch?v=OCYNK6WVcbY
