= Charles Arthur Banks =

Lieutenant Governor of British Columbia (1885–1961)

The Honourable Charles Arthur Banks CMG
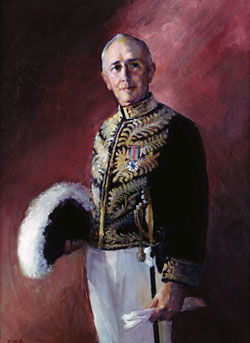

17th Lieutenant-Governor of British Columbia
- In office October 1, 1946 – October 1, 1950
- Monarch: George VI
- Governor General: The Viscount Alexander of Tunis
- Premier: John Hart; Boss Johnson
- Preceded by: William Culham Woodward
- Succeeded by: Clarence Wallace

Personal details
- Born: 18 May 1885 Thames, New Zealand
- Died: 28 September 1961 (aged 76) Vancouver, British Columbia
- Education: Thames School of Mines; Colorado School of Mines
- Occupation: mining industrialist, engineer
- Profession: Politician

Charles Arthur Banks, CMG (18 May 1885 – 28 September 1961) was the 17th Lieutenant Governor of British Columbia.

In New Zealand, Banks studied engineering at the Thames School of Mines and Colorado School of Mines. After obtaining his degree, Banks immigrated to British Columbia. During World War I, Banks served with the Royal Engineers.

After the war Banks resumed his career in the mining industry. Among other ventures, Banks co-founded the Placer Development Co., later Placer Dome, which was acquired by Barrick Gold in 2006. In 1937, the Mining and Metallurgical Society of America awarded its Gold Medal to Banks for his role in the aerial development of remote mines.

During World War II, Banks served in London as the representative of the Government of Canada. His duties included management of the transportation of supplies for the war effort. His wartime service earned Banks the C.M.G.

Banks was appointed as Lieutenant-Governor on 1 October 1946 and served in that office for four years. After his term in office, Banks relocated to Vancouver where he lived until his death in 1961. Amongst the bequests in his will was a $1.1 million gift to the University of British Columbia used to establish a fund for needy students in his and his wife's name.

== Sources ==
- McGregor, D.A. (1967). They Gave Royal Assent - The Lieutenant-Governors of British Columbia. Mitchell Press Limited.
