= Reefton School of Mines =

School of mines

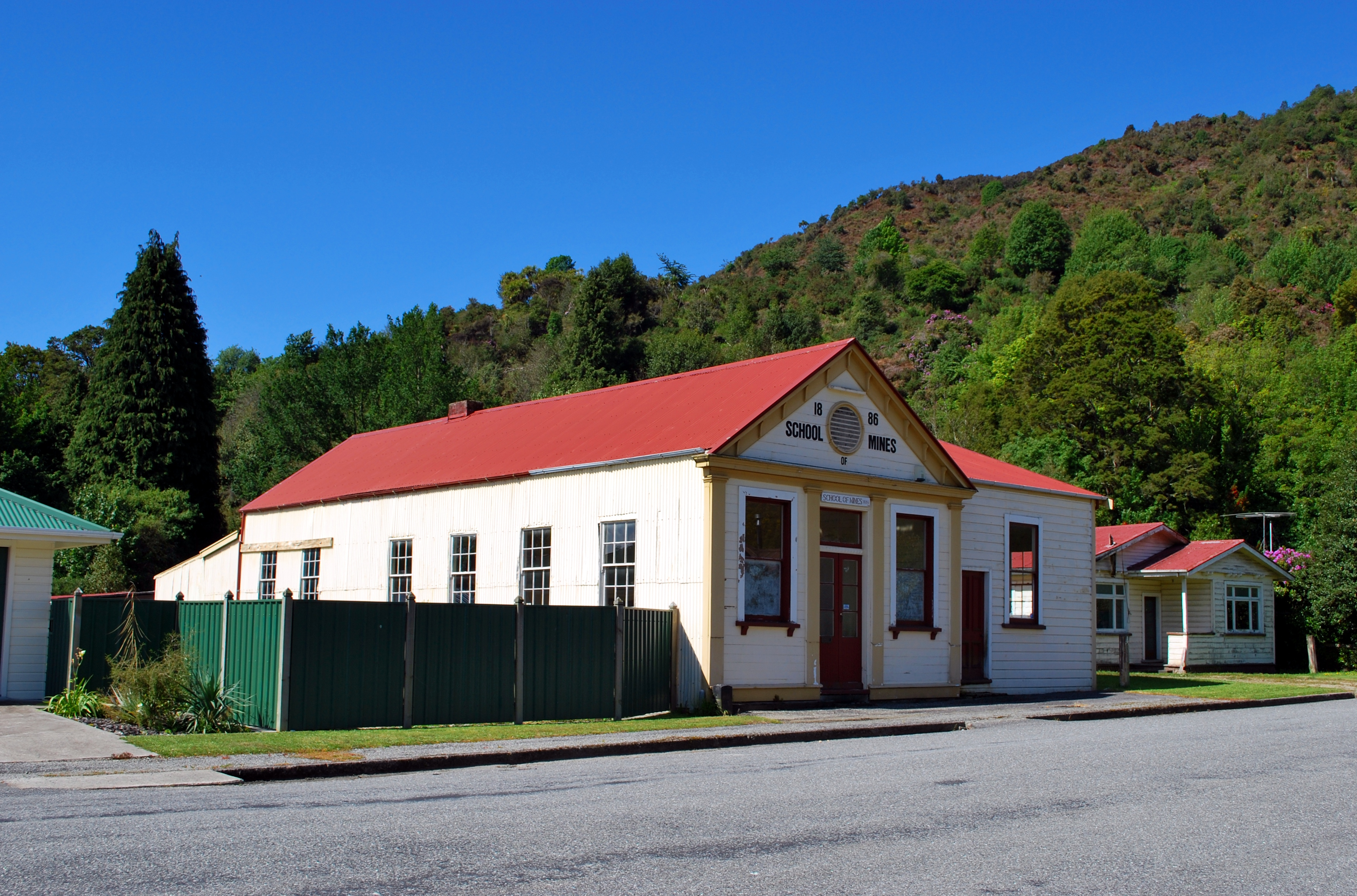

Location
- 22 Shiel Street; Reefton, New Zealand
- Coordinates: 42.1189371715°S 171.868563678°E

Information
- Opened: 1887
- Closed: 1970

The School of Mines in Reefton, New Zealand (1887–1970) was one of a number of mining schools set up to teach the science of mining during the 19th century gold rush. Like the Thames School of Mines it is a Heritage New Zealand Category 1 listed historic building.

== History ==
The Reefton Mining Institute was formed in March 1885. In the same year Professor James Gow Black from the University of Otago commenced lecturing there and an application was made to the government for a School of Mines building; land was granted in Shiel St. The building was opened in 1887.

The purpose of the school was to teach the science related to mining, both theory and practice. Subjects such as mathematics, surveying, chemistry and assaying were taught.

=== Directors of the School ===
- Thomas Fenton, 1886–1890
- John Joseph Woodmass Lee, 1899–1902
- Thomas Otto Bishop, 1902–1903
- John Henderson, 1903–1911
- John Francis McPadden, 1911–1915
- John Herbert Williamson, 1915–1917
- Sydney Arthur Alexander Fry, 1917–1919
- John Francis McPadden, 1919–1920
- John Joseph Woodmass Lee, 1920–1927
- Lionel William Stevens, 1930–1938
- Leslie Clifton, 1938
- William James Bolitho, 1938–1970

Other Schools of Mines were set up in Coromandel, Waikato, West Coast, Nelson and Otago.

The school closed in 1970 when the then director Jim Bolitho retired. The building was then used by the St John's Ambulance from 1972 to 1989 when the Reefton School of Mines Historic Reserve was created.

== Current status ==
Since 1990 the building has been registered by Heritage New Zealand as a Category I structure, with registration number 263.

== See also ==
- List of historic places in Buller District
