= John Henderson (geologist) =

New Zealand geologist and science administrator

- Born: 13 May 1880; Dunedin, New Zealand
- Died: 5 March 1959 (aged 78); Hataitai, Wellington, New Zealand
- Education: University of Otago

John Henderson CBE (13 May 1880 – 5 March 1959) was a New Zealand geologist and science administrator.

== Biography ==
Born in Dunedin in 1880, Henderson was educated at Otago Boys' High School. He then studied at the University of Otago, where he completed his BSc and Diploma in Mining and Certificate of Metallurgical Chemist and Assayer in 1902. He graduated MA from Victoria University College in 1906, and DSc from Otago and Victoria in 1908.

He served as director of the Reefton School of Mines from 1903 to 1911, when he joined the New Zealand Geological Survey as a mining geologist. He succeeded Percy Morgan as director of the Geological Survey in 1928. Henderson retired in 1945 and was himself succeeded by Montague Ongley.

He was elected a Fellow of the Royal Society of New Zealand in 1929, and was award the society's Hector Medal in 1945. In the 1948 New Year Honours he was appointed a Commander of the Order of the British Empire, in recognition of his service as director of the New Zealand Geological Survey.

Henderson died at his home in the Wellington suburb of Hataitai in 1959, and his ashes were buried in Karori Cemetery.
