= Mayor of Buller =

Elected official in New Zealand

Mayor of Buller District
- Incumbent; Chris Russell since 2025
- Style: His/Her Worship
- Seat: Westport
- Term length: Three years
- Inaugural holder: Pat O'Dea
- Formation: 1989
- Deputy: Sharon Roche
- Salary: $115,736
- Website: Official website

The mayor of Buller officiates over the Buller District Council. The mayor is directly elected using the first-past-the-post electoral system.

Chris Russell has been the mayor since the 2025 local elections.

== History ==
Buller District was established as part of the 1989 local government amalgamation of Buller County, Westport Borough and Inangahua County.

Pat O'Dea was mayor for seven terms until his defeat in 2004, i.e. he was the inaugural mayor of Buller District, but had previously been mayor of Westport Borough since 1983. In the 2001 local elections, Westport lawyer Martin Sawyers came within 335 votes of O'Dea, but in the 2004 local elections, Sawyers had a majority of 1072 votes. Sawyers retired after his three-year term.

The 2007 mayoral election was contested by Pat O'Dea, Pat McManus, and Inangahua Ward councillor Graeme Neylon; McManus was elected. The 2010 mayoral election was fought by O'Dea and McManus, with the incumbent again successful. At the 2013 local elections, McManus retired for health reasons after having earlier declared that he would stand for a third term. The mayor from 2013 to 2019 was Garry Howard, who defeated three-term councillor Margaret Montgomery and Greg Hart, who was first elected onto the council in the Westport Ward in 2013.

== List of mayors ==
Buller District has had five mayors:

	Name	Portrait	Term
1	Pat O'Dea		1989–2004
2	Martin Sawyers		2004–2007
3	Pat McManus		2007–2013
4	Garry Howard		2013–2019
5	Jamie Cleine		2019–2025
6	Chris Russell		2025–present
