= Buller District Council =

Territorial authority of New Zealand

Coordinates: 41.6438423°S 170.8878395°E

Type
- Type: Unicameral of Buller District
- Houses: Governing Body
- Term limits: None

History
- Founded: 6 March 1989

Leadership
- Mayor: Chris Russell

Structure
- Seats: 11 (1 mayor, 10 ward seats)
- Length of term: 3 years

Website
- bullerdc.govt.nz

Buller District Council is the territorial authority for the Buller District of New Zealand.

The council is led by the mayor of Buller, who is currently Chris Russell. There are also ten ward councillors, two representing Seddon Ward, six representing Westport Ward, and two representing Inangahua Ward.

== Composition ==
Westport Ward has six councilors: Deputy Mayor Sharon Roche, Robyn Nahr, Joanne Howard, Grant Weston, Margaret Montgomery and Phil Rutherford. Inangahua Ward has two councillors: Dave Hawes and John Bougen. Seddon Ward has two councillors: Rosalie Sampson and Martin Hill.

There is also a non-elected Māori Portfolio Councillor, Francois Tumahai.

Inangahua Community Board has six members: Alun Bollinger, Linda Webb, Ina Lineham, Cory Aitken, Dave Hawes and John Bougen.

== History ==
The council was formed in 1989, replacing Buller County Council (1876–1989) and Westport County Council (1873–1989).

In 2020, the council had 109 staff, including 17 earning more than $100,000. According to the right-wing Taxpayers' Union think tank, residential rates averaged $1,949.
