= Buller County, New Zealand =

Coordinates: 41.813°S 171.793°E

Buller County
- County of New Zealand
- 1876–1989
- Capital: Westport Borough
- History
  - Established: 1876
  - Disestablished: 1989
- Today part of: Buller District

Buller County was one of the counties of New Zealand on the South Island.

During the period 1853 to 1876, the area that would become Buller County was administered as part of Nelson Province. With the Abolition of Provinces Act 1876, Buller County was created, taking over administration of its area in January 1877. The county council's administrative headquarters were located in Westport Borough.

Buller County existed until the 1989 local government reforms, when the Buller District was formed through the amalgamation of the Buller County, Inangahua County and Westport Borough administrative areas.

The county took its name from the Buller River, itself named for Charles Buller, Member of Parliament in the United Kingdom of Great Britain and Ireland (UK) and director of the New Zealand Company, a UK-based company in the early 1800s with a royal charter supporting colonization efforts of New Zealand.

== See also ==
- List of former territorial authorities in New Zealand § Counties
