= Buller District =

- Territorial authority district
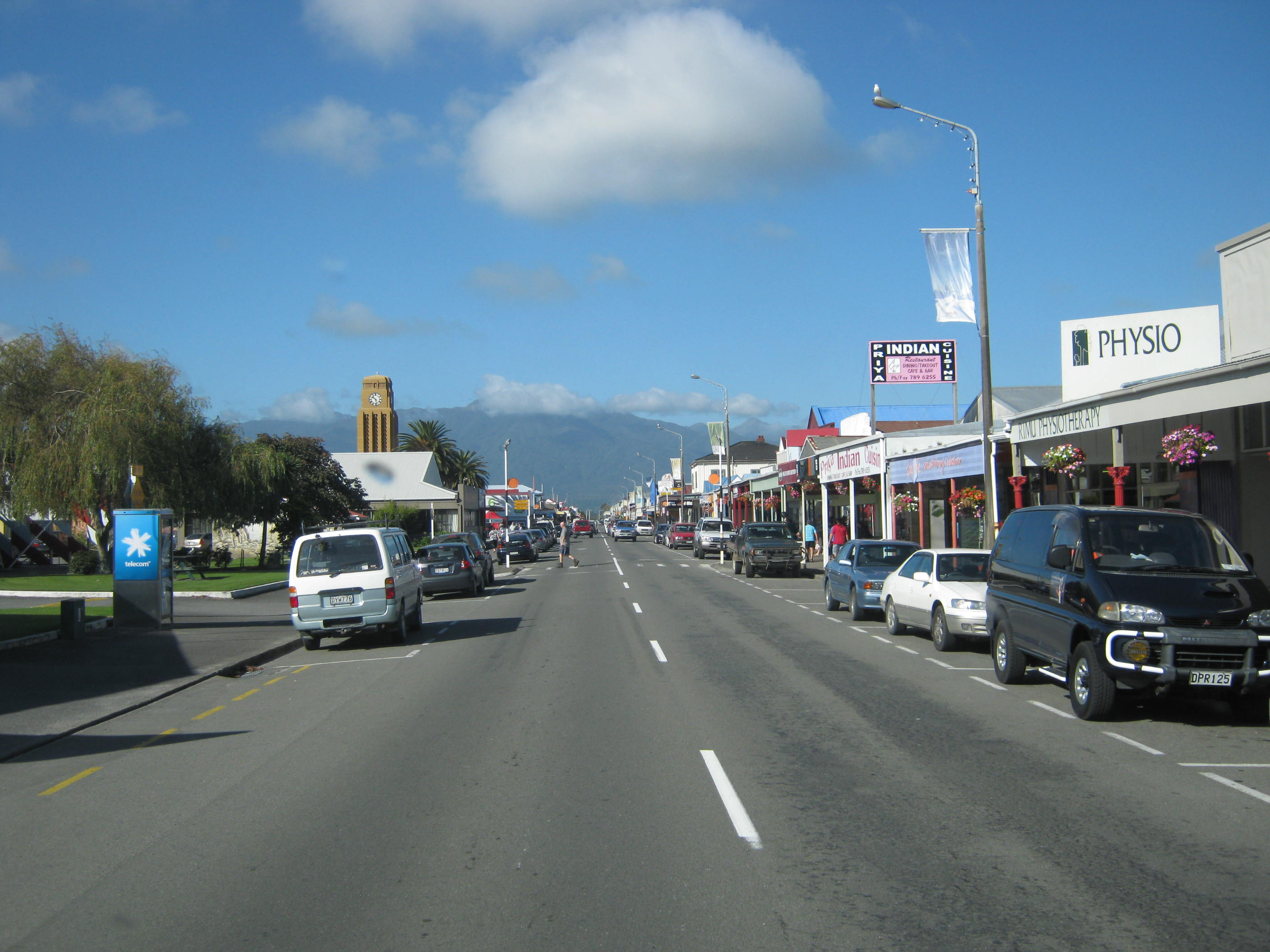
- View of Westport, the district's main town

- Buller district in the South Island
- Coordinates: 41°48′47″S 171°47′35″E
- Country: New Zealand
- Region: West Coast Region
- Wards: Seddon; Westport; Inangahua
- Seat: Westport

Government
  - Mayor: Chris Russell
  - Territorial authority: Buller District Council

Area
  - Total: 7,943.35 km^{2} (3,066.94 sq mi)

Population (June 2025)
  - Total: 10,650
  - Density: 1.341/km^{2} (3.473/sq mi)
- Time zone: UTC+12 (NZST)
  - Summer (DST): UTC+13 (NZDT)
- Postcode(s): Map of postcodes
- Area code: 03
- Website: bullerdc.govt.nz

Buller District is in the northern West Coast Region of the South Island of New Zealand. It is one of the country's 53 territorial authority districts. Its main town is Westport, where 45% of the population lives. Other settlements include Reefton, Karamea, Punakaiki and Inangahua.

The district covers a land area of 7,943.35 km^{2} (3,066.94 sq mi). It is administered by the Buller District Council, which is headquartered in Westport.

== History ==
It is understood by the carbon dating of umu (ovens) that the Māori people settled in this region some 700 years ago.

The district takes its name from the Buller River, itself named for Charles Buller, a Member of Parliament in the United Kingdom of Great Britain and Ireland (UK) and director of the New Zealand Company, a UK-based company established in the early 19th century with a royal charter supporting colonisation efforts of New Zealand.

During the period 1853 to 1876, the current area of Buller District was administered as part of Nelson Province. With the Abolition of Provinces Act 1876, much of the current area of Buller District was administered in the newly created (January 1877) bodies of Buller County and Inangahua County.

The Buller District was formed under the 1989 local government reforms through the amalgamation of Buller County, Inangahua County and the Westport Borough Councils.

== Population ==
Buller District covers 7,943.35 km^{2} (3,066.94 sq mi) and had a 'usually resident population count' of 10,446 as of the 2023 New Zealand census, meaning a population density of 1.3 people per km^{2}.

Historical population
Year	Pop.	±% p.a.
2006	9,702	—
2013	10,473	+1.10%
2018	9,591	−1.74%
2023	10,446	+1.72%

Buller District's 2023 census population was an increase of 855 people (8.9%) compared to the 2018 census, and a decrease of 27 people (−0.3%) compared to the 2013 census. Buller District was the only territorial authority of New Zealand to see a population decrease between the 2013 and 2023 censuses.

Data that follows is from the 2023 census. There were 5,358 males, 5,049 females and 36 people of other genders in 5,049 dwellings. 2.7% of people identified as LGBTIQ+. The median age was 52.0 years (compared with 38.1 years nationally). There were 1,536 people (14.7%) aged under 15 years, 1,197 (11.5%) aged 15 to 29, 4,962 (47.5%) aged 30 to 64, and 2,751 (26.3%) aged 65 or older.

People could identify as more than one ethnicity. The results were 90.6% European (Pākehā); 13.0% Māori; 1.7% Pasifika; 3.3% Asian; 0.6% Middle Eastern, Latin American and African New Zealanders (MELAA); and 4.3% other, which includes people giving their ethnicity as "New Zealander". English was spoken by 98.2%, Māori language by 2.3%, and other languages by 5.1%. No language could be spoken by 1.2% (e.g. too young to talk). New Zealand Sign Language was known by 0.4%. The percentage of people born overseas was 13.4, compared with 28.8% nationally.

Religious affiliations were 26.7% Christian, 0.5% Hindu, 0.1% Islam, 0.3% Māori religious beliefs, 0.5% Buddhist, 0.8% New Age, 0.1% Jewish, and 1.5% other religions. People who answered that they had no religion were 59.6%, and 10.1% of people did not answer the census question.

Of those at least 15 years old, 750 (8.4%) people had a bachelor's or higher degree, 4,920 (55.2%) had a post-high school certificate or diploma, and 2,946 (33.1%) people exclusively held high school qualifications. The median income was $28,800, compared with $41,500 nationally. 558 people (6.3%) earned over $100,000 compared to 12.1% nationally. The employment status of those at least 15 was that 3,504 (39.3%) people were employed full-time, 1,356 (15.2%) were part-time, and 270 (3.0%) were unemployed.

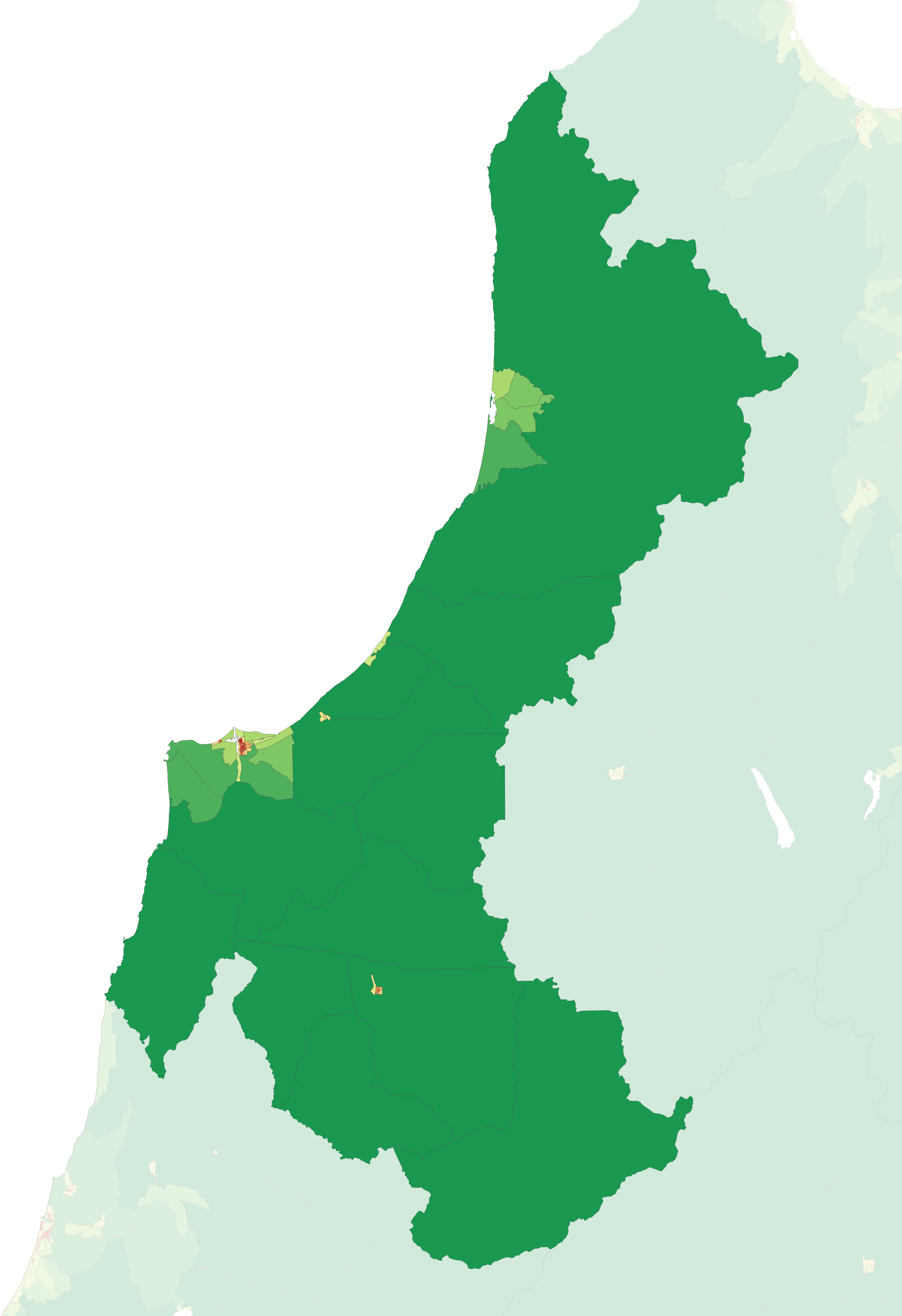
Population density in the 2023 census

Individual wards
Name	Area (km^{2})	Population	Density (per km^{2})	Dwellings	Median age	Median income
Seddon Ward	3,627.70	1,872	0.52	963	57.1 years	$25,900
Inangahua Ward	3,198.56	1,929	0.60	963	49.9 years	$30,000
Westport Ward	1,117.09	6,642	5.95	3,123	51.1 years	$29,500
New Zealand					38.1 years	$41,500
