= Westport, New Zealand =

Town on the West Coast, New Zealand

Westport Kawatiri (Māori)
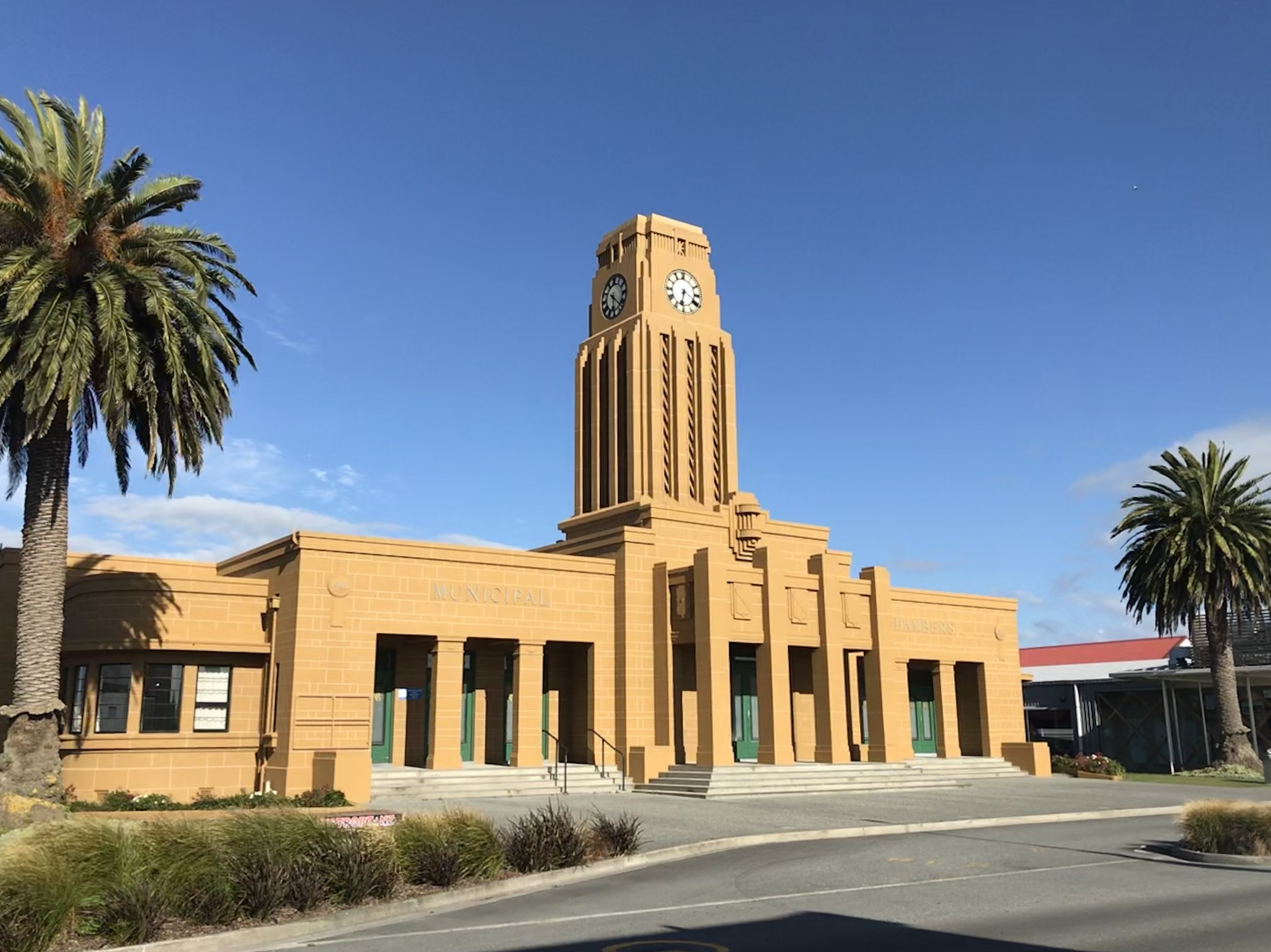
- Interactive map of Westport
- Coordinates: 41°45′29″S 171°36′8″E
- Country: New Zealand
- Region: West Coast
- District: Buller District
- Ward: Westport
- Electorates: West Coast-Tasman; Te Tai Tonga

Government
  - Territorial Authority: Buller District Council
  - Regional council: West Coast Regional Council
  - Mayor of Buller: Chris Russell
  - West Coast-Tasman MP: Katie Milne
  - Te Tai Tonga MP: Mananui Ramsden

Area
  - Total: 11.53 km^{2} (4.45 sq mi)

Population (June 2025)
  - Total: 4,600
  - Density: 400/km^{2} (1,000/sq mi)

Westport (Māori: Kawatiri) is the main town of the Buller District in the West Coast Region of the South Island of New Zealand. Established in 1861, it is the oldest European settlement on the West Coast. Originally named Buller, it is on the right bank and at the mouth of the Buller River, close to the prominent headland of Cape Foulwind. It is connected with Greymouth, 100 kilometres (62 mi) to the south, via State Highway 6, and with Nelson, 222 kilometres (138 mi) to the northeast, via the Buller Gorge. The Westport urban area has 4,600 residents, out of a Buller District population of 10,650, as of June 2025.

== Name ==
The Māori language name for the river and the region is Kawatiri, meaning deep and swift. The town is thought to have been named after Westport, County Mayo in Ireland, although the choice of name was no doubt also guided by its location.

== History ==
From an archaeological excavation site, near the mouth of the Buller River (Kawatiri), it is clear that Māori were living close to Westport by the early 14th century. Māori mostly lived in coastal areas, though they explored the mountains for pounamu (jade or greenstone), which they then traded with other iwi.

The first wave of European settlers came to Westport in 1861 as gold miners, and the first European vessel said to have entered the river was the sealing schooner Three Brothers in 1844, though other sealing vessels were recorded in the Cape Foulwind area in the 1820s. The 1840s saw many exploratory parties of geologists and surveyors combing the area for the presence of valuable resources and taking the measure of the land. Amongst them were Charles Heaphy, William Fox and Thomas Brunner. While gold brought initial interest to the area, and for example, led to large areas of the coastal areas (covered by sediment from the river) being dredged for the valuable mineral, the area soon became much more famous for coal mining, still a dominant concern in the region today.

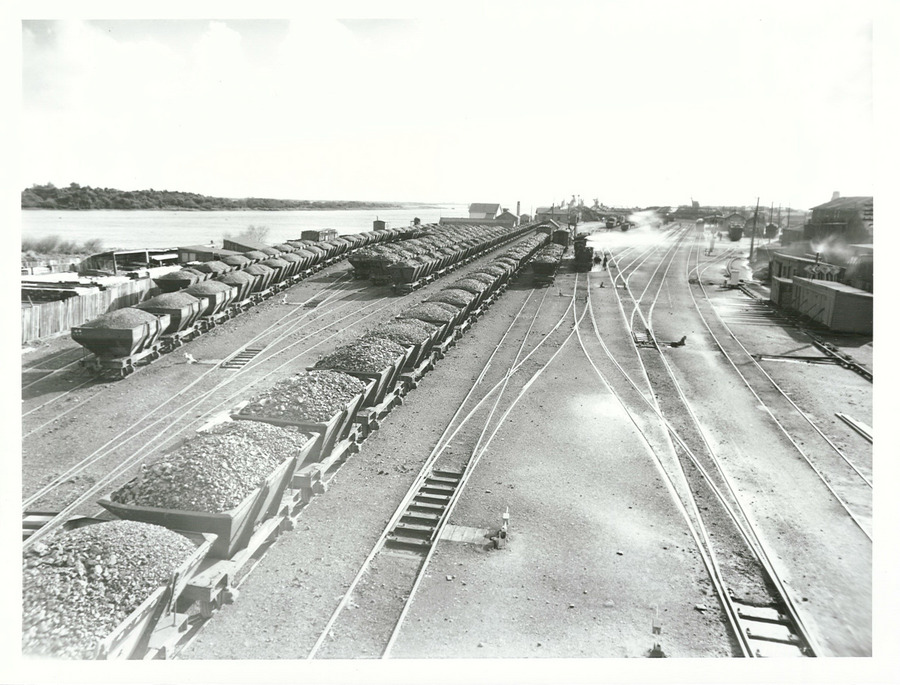
Loaded coal trucks in the Westport Railway yard

A coal mining company was formed in 1878 called the Westport Colliery Company Ltd, and then became The Westport Coal Company in 1881 when a group of Dunedin businessmen purchased the mines. The coal fields were at Coalbrookdale (Denniston) and Granity Creek (Millerton) and coal was transported to the Westport harbour to be shipped out. By 1905 The Westport Coal Company was New Zealand's largest coal producer.

Westport was administrated as part of the Nelson Province from 1853 to 1876.

Westport has been damaged by several earthquakes, the worst the 1929 Murchison earthquake, in which several buildings collapsed, including the post office tower. The town now has a number of Art Deco buildings that were constructed after the earthquake, for example the Clock Tower Chambers.

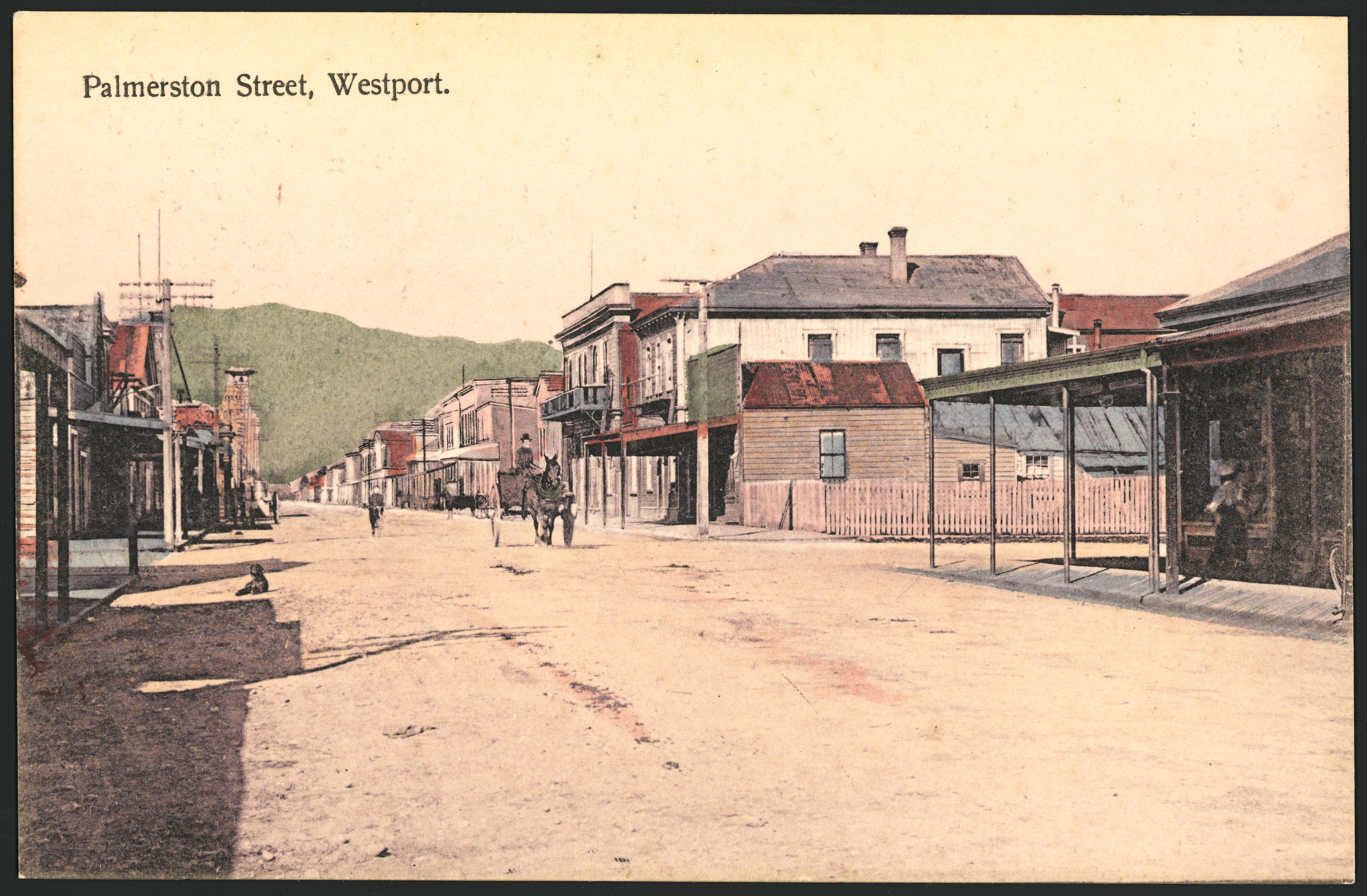
Palmerston Street, Westport. New Zealand post card, issued by G Parkhouse. Phototyped in Saxony (ca 1910)

=== Flooding ===
Westport and the Buller District have had several floods since 1846. In January 1868, heavy rain led to flooding that destroyed two wharves. The town was flooded again in October and November 1926, and in 1970, 2012, and 2015. In 2018, Westport was damaged by Cyclone Fehi, during the 2017–18 South Pacific cyclone season. According to Land River Sea Consulting founder and river engineer Matthew Gardner, Westport is sited on a flood-prone catchment and climate change is causing water levels to rise. A West Coast Regional Council spokesperson expressed concern about the under-investment in flood protection, including dredging and river management work in Westport.

In July 2021, wet weather throughout New Zealand caused more flooding, leading to the evacuation of about 2,000 people, roughly half of the town's 4,600 residents. The flood caused millions of dollars in damages and damaged hundreds of homes in Westport. 563 homes were damaged with 70 homes being red stickered and 393 homes being yellow stickered. 23% of the town's 983 dwellings required repairs. By mid-October 2021, 450 homes remained uninhabitable or damaged. 140 people remained in temporary accommodation including cabins, motels, or relatives' homes.

In February 2022, Westport and the Buller District had heavy rain and significant flooding that damaged homes, infrastructure, farms, and roads. Residents were evacuated. On 10 February, a state of emergency was declared in the Buller District. Minister of Rural Affairs Damien O'Connor described the February flooding in Westport as "one of the worst he had seen" and attributed it to climate change. On 23 February, Prime Minister Jacinda Ardern announced a NZ$500,000 Task Force Green scheme to assist farmers in Westport and the wider West Coast region with flood damage.

By July 2022, only a little more than 100 of the 563 homes needing repair in Westport after the 2021 flood had been fully repaired. Buller District Council and West Coast Regional Council submitted a NZ$54 million business case for the region, which includes investing in flood walls, subsidising people to move from flood-prone areas, and investing in Westport's stormwater system.

In late December 2025, AA Insurance temporarily halted the issuing of new home, landlord and business insurance policies in Westport due to the town's high flood risk.

== Geography ==
=== Climate ===
The Westport climate is strongly influenced by the high amount of precipitation from the Tasman Sea, with all months being rather wet on average. Despite very high annual rainfall, Westport is often prone to drought and conservation measures are sometimes triggered. While colder than the more northern parts of New Zealand, average temperature changes over the year are not extreme.

Climate data for Westport Airport (1991–2020 normals, extremes 1937–present)
Month	Jan	Feb	Mar	Apr	May	Jun	Jul	Aug	Sep	Oct	Nov	Dec	Year
Record high °C (°F)	29.1 (84.4)	29.2 (84.6)	28.6 (83.5)	28.4 (83.1)	25.0 (77.0)	20.3 (68.5)	18.0 (64.4)	19.3 (66.7)	22.0 (71.6)	22.7 (72.9)	25.7 (78.3)	27.3 (81.1)	29.2 (84.6)
Mean maximum °C (°F)	23.7 (74.7)	24.2 (75.6)	23.1 (73.6)	21.0 (69.8)	18.9 (66.0)	16.4 (61.5)	15.9 (60.6)	15.9 (60.6)	17.5 (63.5)	18.5 (65.3)	20.3 (68.5)	22.0 (71.6)	25.1 (77.2)
Mean daily maximum °C (°F)	20.2 (68.4)	20.7 (69.3)	19.8 (67.6)	17.5 (63.5)	15.5 (59.9)	13.7 (56.7)	12.9 (55.2)	13.4 (56.1)	14.5 (58.1)	15.4 (59.7)	16.9 (62.4)	18.7 (65.7)	16.6 (61.9)
Daily mean °C (°F)	16.4 (61.5)	16.8 (62.2)	15.8 (60.4)	13.6 (56.5)	11.7 (53.1)	9.8 (49.6)	8.9 (48.0)	9.5 (49.1)	10.7 (51.3)	11.8 (53.2)	13.1 (55.6)	15.2 (59.4)	12.8 (55.0)
Mean daily minimum °C (°F)	12.6 (54.7)	12.9 (55.2)	11.8 (53.2)	9.7 (49.5)	7.8 (46.0)	5.9 (42.6)	4.9 (40.8)	5.6 (42.1)	7.0 (44.6)	8.2 (46.8)	9.4 (48.9)	11.6 (52.9)	9.0 (48.2)
Mean minimum °C (°F)	8.2 (46.8)	8.6 (47.5)	7.1 (44.8)	4.9 (40.8)	2.7 (36.9)	1.1 (34.0)	0.8 (33.4)	1.1 (34.0)	2.3 (36.1)	3.6 (38.5)	5.0 (41.0)	7.1 (44.8)	−0.3 (31.5)
Record low °C (°F)	4.7 (40.5)	2.9 (37.2)	1.0 (33.8)	0.7 (33.3)	−2.5 (27.5)	−3.5 (25.7)	−1.5 (29.3)	−2.5 (27.5)	−1.8 (28.8)	−0.6 (30.9)	0.5 (32.9)	3.7 (38.7)	−3.5 (25.7)
Average rainfall mm (inches)	163.4 (6.43)	121.4 (4.78)	143.1 (5.63)	163.8 (6.45)	186.5 (7.34)	199.5 (7.85)	170.1 (6.70)	187.0 (7.36)	182.6 (7.19)	202.2 (7.96)	157.3 (6.19)	196.9 (7.75)	2,073.8 (81.63)
Average rainy days (≥ 1.0 mm)	12.0	10.4	11.6	12.3	15.3	16.4	14.1	15.7	17.0	17.9	14.6	14.9	172.2
Average relative humidity (%)	83.3	86.4	86.7	85.8	87.7	86.6	84.3	85.2	82.7	84.6	80.3	82.4	84.7
Mean monthly sunshine hours	213.0	174.9	164.2	151.5	114.7	93.4	120.7	118.6	138.9	158.4	171.7	179.4	1,799.4
Source 1: NIWA Climate Data
Source 2: CliFlo

== Demographics ==
Stats NZ describes Westport as a small urban area, which covers 11.53 km^{2} (4.45 sq mi). It had an estimated population of 4,600 as of June 2025, with a population density of 399 people per km^{2}.

Historical population
Year	Pop.	±% p.a.
2006	4,509	—
2013	4,758	+0.77%
2018	4,392	−1.59%
2023	4,527	+0.61%

Westport had a population of 4,527 in the 2023 New Zealand census, an increase of 135 people (3.1%) since the 2018 census, and a decrease of 231 people (−4.9%) since the 2013 census. There were 2,313 males, 2,202 females, and 15 people of other genders in 2,157 dwellings. 2.7% of people identified as LGBTIQ+. The median age was 50.2 years (compared with 38.1 years nationally). There were 684 people (15.1%) aged under 15 years, 603 (13.3%) aged 15 to 29, 2,028 (44.8%) aged 30 to 64, and 1,212 (26.8%) aged 65 or older.

People could identify as more than one ethnicity. The results were 89.5% European (Pākehā); 14.5% Māori; 2.3% Pasifika; 4.3% Asian; 0.7% Middle Eastern, Latin American and African New Zealanders (MELAA); and 4.0% other, which includes people giving their ethnicity as "New Zealander". English was spoken by 97.9%, Māori by 2.5%, and other languages by 4.8%. No language could be spoken by 1.4% (e.g. too young to talk). New Zealand Sign Language was known by 0.5%. The percentage of people born overseas was 11.8, compared with 28.8% nationally.

Religious affiliations were 28.3% Christian, 0.7% Hindu, 0.1% Islam, 0.4% Māori religious beliefs, 0.5% Buddhist, 0.8% New Age, and 1.4% other religions. People who answered that they had no religion were 57.6%, and 10.3% of people did not answer the census question.

Of those at least 15 years old, 378 (9.8%) people had a bachelor's or higher degree, 2,082 (54.2%) had a post-high school certificate or diploma, and 1,383 (36.0%) people exclusively held high school qualifications. The median income was $28,800, compared with $41,500 nationally. 231 people (6.0%) earned over $100,000 compared to 12.1% nationally. The employment status of those at least 15 was 1,503 (39.1%) full-time, 528 (13.7%) part-time, and 126 (3.3%) unemployed.

Individual statistical areas
Name	Area (km^{2})	Population	Density (per km^{2})	Dwellings	Median age	Median income
Westport North	8.66	1,920	222	969	50.9 years	$29,300
Westport South	2.87	2,610	909	1,185	49.5 years	$28,400
New Zealand					38.1 years	$41,500

=== Rural surrounds ===
Westport Rural surrounds Westport on the west, south and east, and includes Carters Beach, Te Kuha and Sergeants Hill. It covers 90.06 km^{2} (34.77 sq mi) and had an estimated population of 1,470 as of June 2025, with a population density of 16 people per km^{2}.

Historical population for Westport Rural
Year	Pop.	±% p.a.
2006	975	—
2013	1,230	+3.37%
2018	1,260	+0.48%
2023	1,446	+2.79%

Westport Rural had a population of 1,446 in the 2023 New Zealand census, an increase of 186 people (14.8%) since the 2018 census, and an increase of 216 people (17.6%) since the 2013 census. There were 720 males, 720 females, and 3 people of other genders in 600 dwellings. 2.7% of people identified as LGBTIQ+. The median age was 52.2 years (compared with 38.1 years nationally). There were 234 people (16.2%) aged under 15 years, 153 (10.6%) aged 15 to 29, 678 (46.9%) aged 30 to 64, and 381 (26.3%) aged 65 or older.

People could identify as more than one ethnicity. The results were 92.9% European (Pākehā); 10.4% Māori; 0.4% Pasifika; 1.9% Asian; 0.6% Middle Eastern, Latin American and African New Zealanders (MELAA); and 3.3% other, which includes people giving their ethnicity as "New Zealander". English was spoken by 98.8%, Māori by 2.1%, and other languages by 4.1%. No language could be spoken by 1.0% (e.g. too young to talk). New Zealand Sign Language was known by 0.4%. The percentage of people born overseas was 11.6, compared with 28.8% nationally.

Religious affiliations were 32.0% Christian, 0.2% Hindu, 0.2% Islam, 0.2% Māori religious beliefs, 0.2% Buddhist, 0.6% New Age, 0.2% Jewish, and 1.2% other religions. People who answered that they had no religion were 56.6%, and 8.5% of people did not answer the census question.

Of those at least 15 years old, 189 (15.6%) people had a bachelor's or higher degree, 702 (57.9%) had a post-high school certificate or diploma, and 321 (26.5%) people exclusively held high school qualifications. The median income was $32,200, compared with $41,500 nationally. 120 people (9.9%) earned over $100,000 compared to 12.1% nationally. The employment status of those at least 15 was 510 (42.1%) full-time, 219 (18.1%) part-time, and 21 (1.7%) unemployed.

== Economy ==
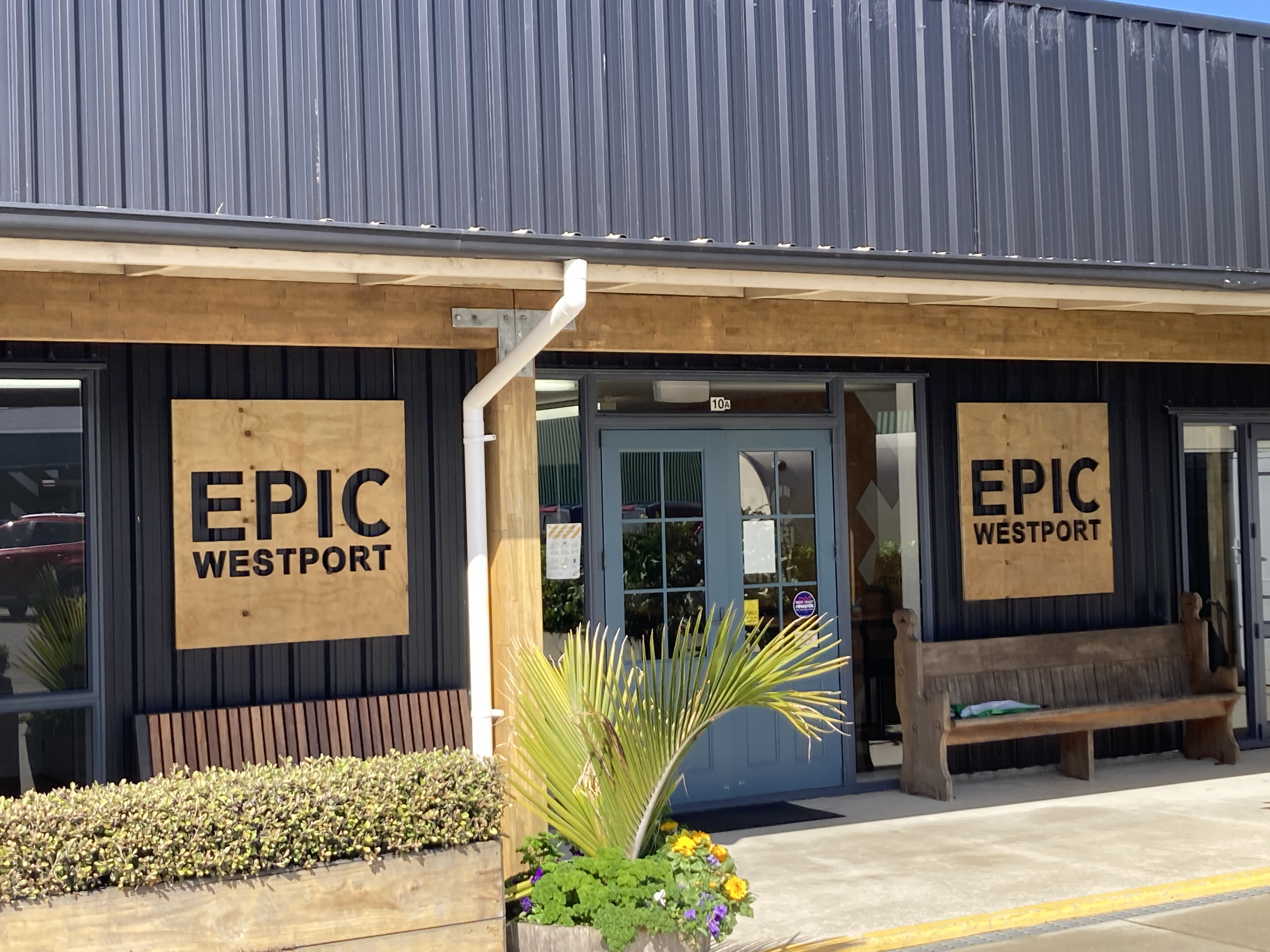
EPIC Westport, a technology hub and coworking space in Westport.

Economic activity is based around fishing, coal mining and dairy farming. Historically, gold mining was a major industry, and coal mining was much more extensive than today (especially in terms of employment numbers). However, the region still is home to New Zealand's largest opencast mining operation in Stockton. Some native forest logging occurred in the area until cessation around 1999.

The Holcim company had a large cement plant in the southwest side of town until its closure on 30 June 2016.

Westport is also home to EPIC Westport an innovation hub, which houses software developers and business startups.

== Tourism ==
Tourist attractions in the area include Cape Foulwind, Tauranga Bay with its large fur seal colony, and fine surfing beaches. The opening of the Old Ghost Road which runs between Lyell and Seddonville to the north of Westport has seen an explosion in the number of mountain bikers visiting the area. The Kawatiri Coastal Trail is under development between Westport, Carters Beach, Cape Foulwind, and Charleston.The Pūwaha Section of the trail from Westport to Carters Beach was the first of nine sections to be built. It was officially opened on 6 December 2020. The remaining sections are expected to be completed by June 2022.

Rafting and jetboating in the Buller Gorge are popular. Westport is a base for trips to Karamea and the Oparara Basin Arches with the only road access to the area running north from Westport. Paparoa National Park is also located nearby.

== Transport ==
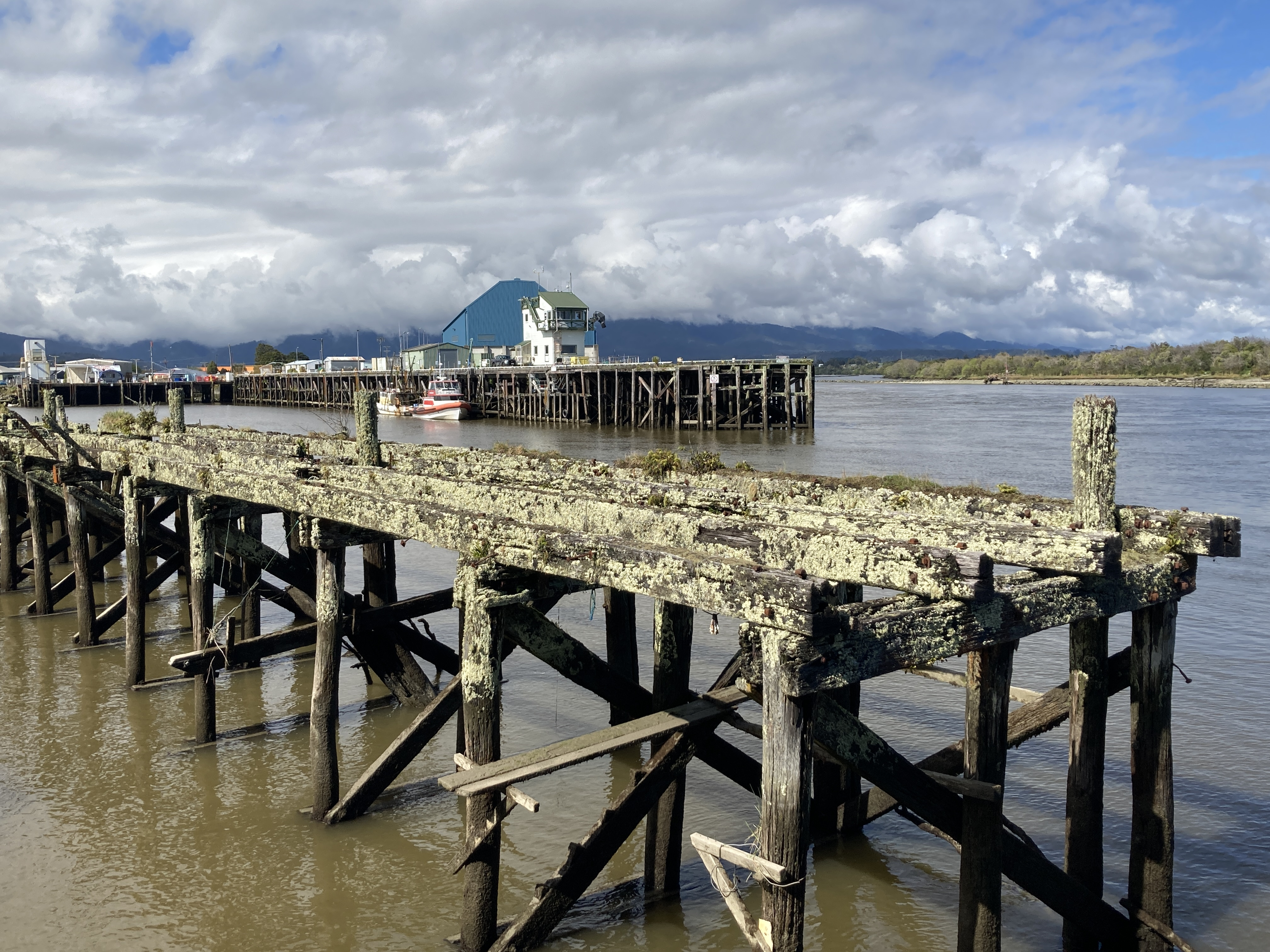
Old cattle wharf, Westport harbour

Westport is served by State Highway 67, and the 8.9 km spur State Highway 67A to Carters Beach and Cape Foulwind which terminates at the former Holcim cement plant location.

The Holcim company managed the day-to-day operations of Westport's port until ceasing operations in the district, using it to ship their cement product to market, for example to the Port of Onehunga in Auckland.

The first railway of the area in 1864 ran from Westport 18 kilometres (11 mi) to the coal fields, most of them north of town. The first section of railway from Westport to Fairdown via Sergeants Hill opened on 31 December 1875; this line ultimately reached Seddonville in 1895 and was known as the Seddonville Branch. From this beginning, an isolated network of branch lines was developed: a Westport-Inangahua branch line of about 12 miles (19 km) was authorised by the Railways Authorisation Act, 1904. But the lines were not linked to the national network until the completion of the Stillwater–Westport Line through the Buller Gorge in 1942.

Westport Airport is a small airport. It was formerly served twice daily on weekdays and daily in the weekend by Air New Zealand from Wellington, and prior to that, flights to Christchurch and Hokitika were also operated. The Air New Zealand service from Wellington service ceased in April 2015 and its place was taken by Sounds Air. Sounds Air announced that it would cease their service in December 2024 and from January 2025 Originair took on this route.

== Facilities ==
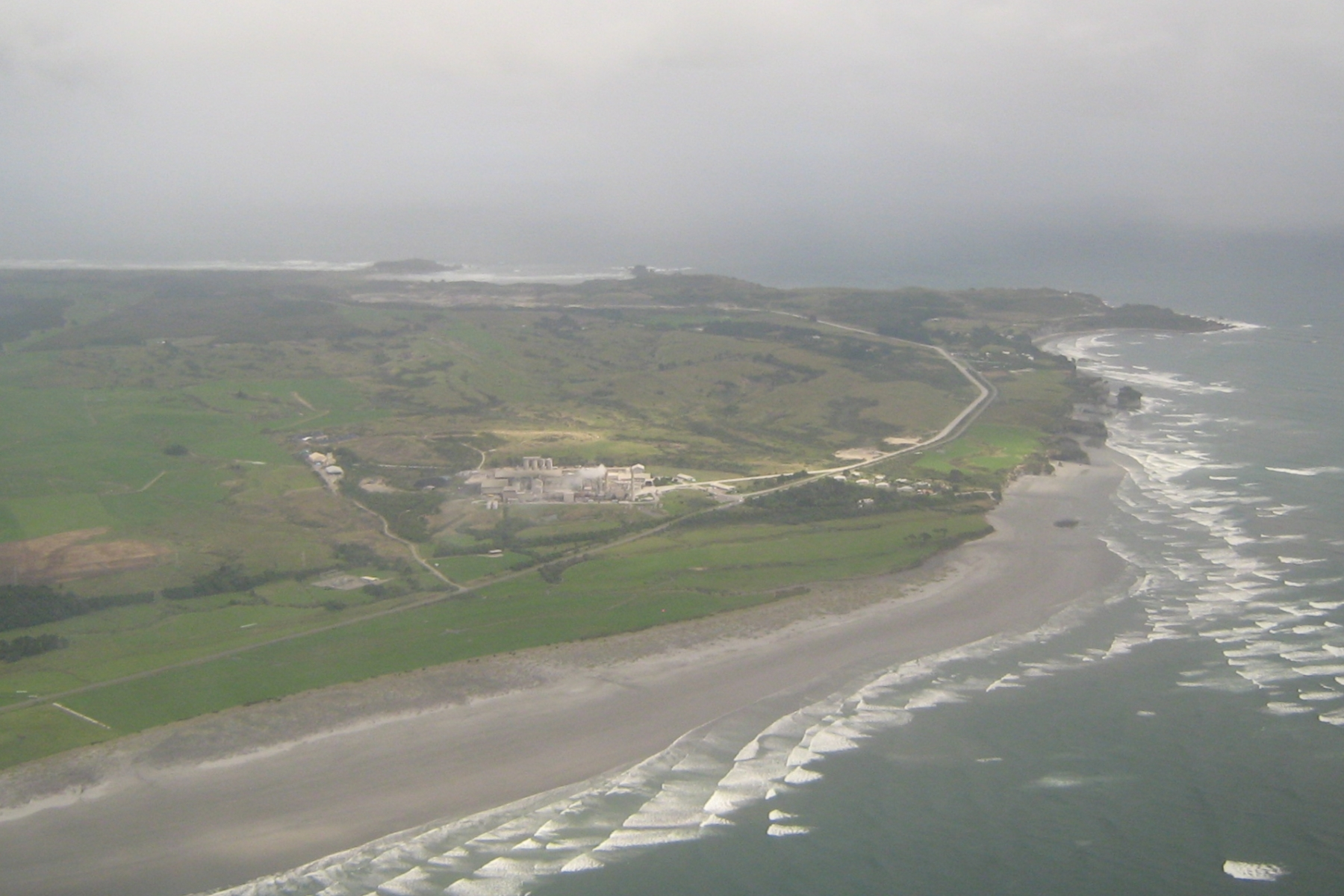
The Holcim cement plant was a large factor in the local economy.

The town used to have one cinema/theatre, the St James Theatre, able to seat 424 patrons for film screenings, theatre productions or other activities. After being found structurally unsound, the theatre had to be demolished. A new theatre has since opened. The NBS theatre has two movie theatres, one which seats 55 people and a boutique theatre that seats approximately 20 people. This theatre also has a large facility with seating for approximately 370 people and a stage for performing.

The township also has a links-style, 18-hole, par-72 golf course. The course measures around 5,600 metres (18,400 ft) with medium to narrow fairways and small "target" greens.

The Pulse Energy Recreation Centre (originally named the Solid Energy Centre), a sports complex, was opened on 18 April 2009.

Te Taha o Te Awa Marae is based at Westport. It is a marae (tribal meeting ground) of Ngāti Apa ki te Rā Tō and its Pūaha Te Rangi hapū, and includes a wharenui (meeting house), also called Te Taha o te Awa.

The Coaltown Museum, opened in 2013, illustrates the area's local history.

Sue Thomson Casey Memorial Library, Buller District's library, is located on Palmerston Street.

== Education ==
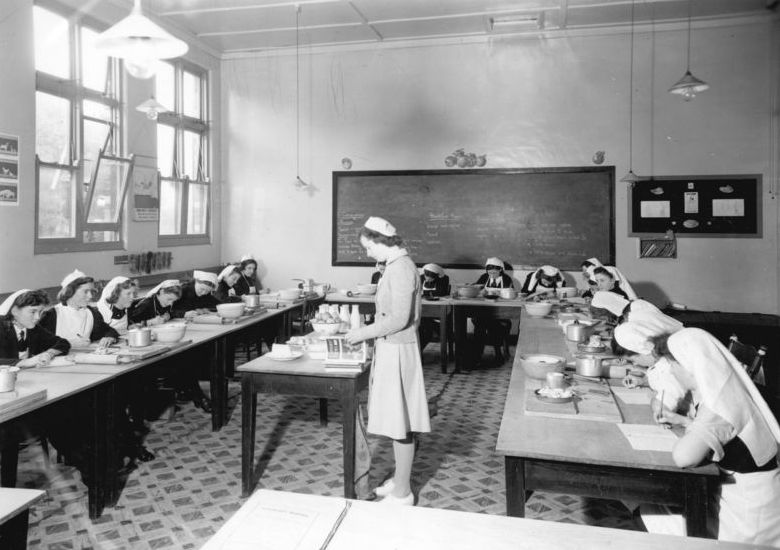
Home science class at Westport Technical High School (now Buller High School)

Buller High School is a secondary (years 9–13) school with a roll of 358. It opened as Westport District High School in 1899, and moved to its current site in 1922.

Westport North School and Westport South School are full primary (years 1–8) schools with rolls of 194 and 231, respectively. The schools were founded in 1942 and 1941

St Canice's School is a full primary (years 1–8) school with a roll of 142. It is a state integrated Catholic school. It opened in 1882.

All these schools are coeducational. School rolls are as of July 2026.

== Media ==
A daily local newspaper is published in Westport, the Westport News. The Westport News building also houses Coast-wide local radio station Coast FM.

== Notable people ==
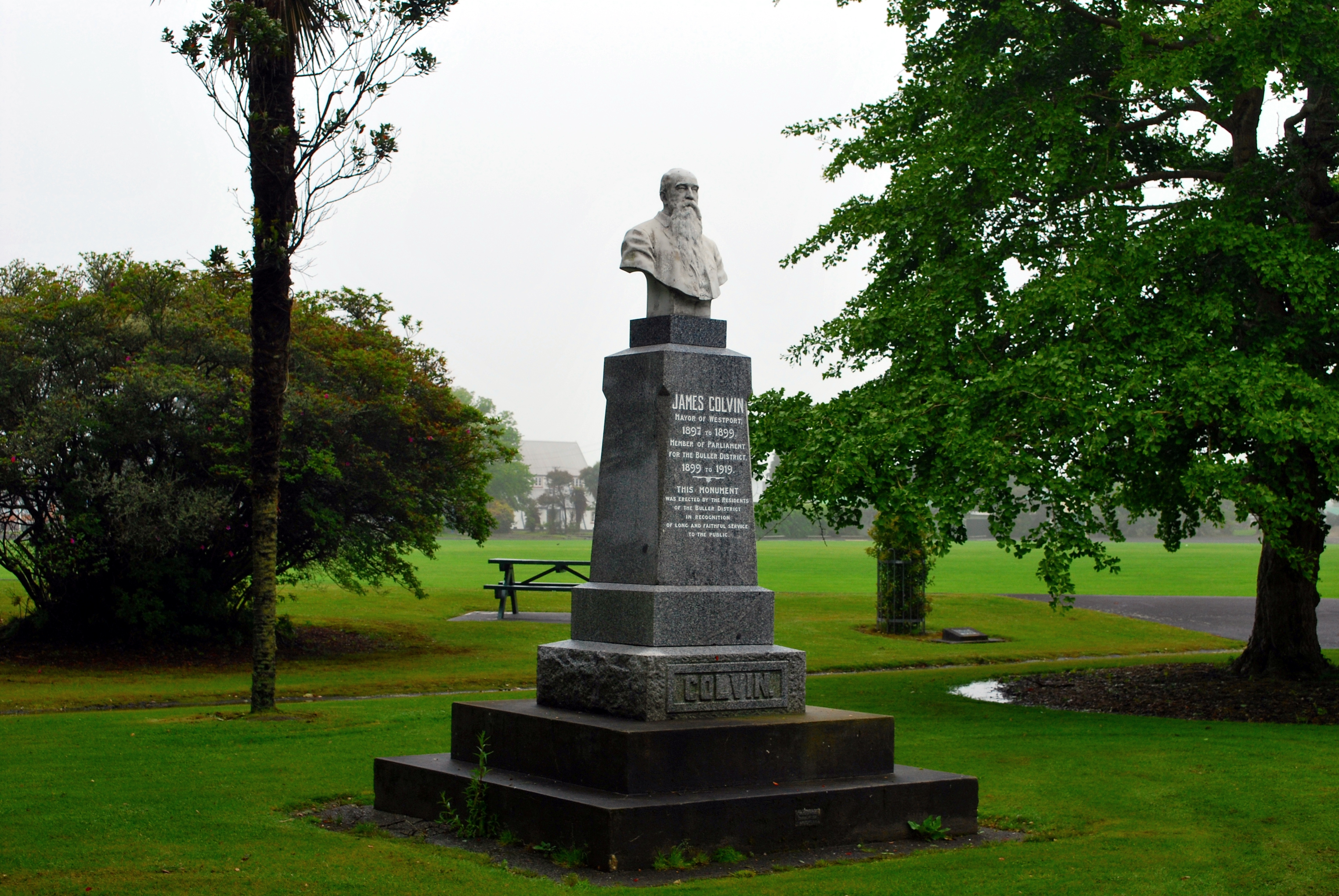
Memorial statue of James Colvin in Westport

- Marlene J Bennetts – poet and children's author
- Ben Blair – rugby union player
- James Colvin – politician
- G. F. J. Dart – educationalist, playwright
- Alan Deere – World War II fighter ace
- Anna Harrison – netball player
- Peter Hawes – playwright, author, actor
- Laura Suisted – journalist

== Notable buildings ==
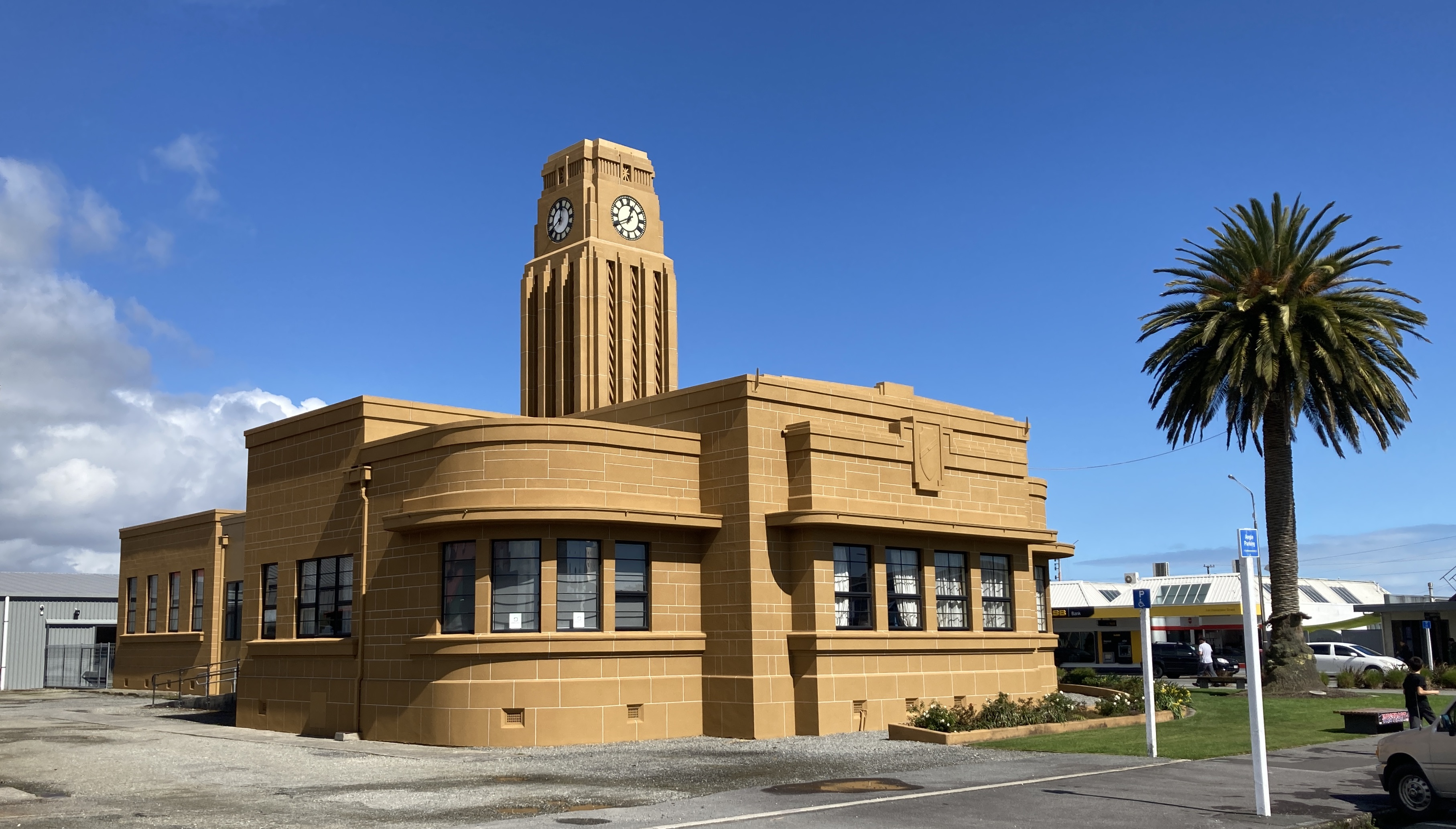
Clock Tower Chambers

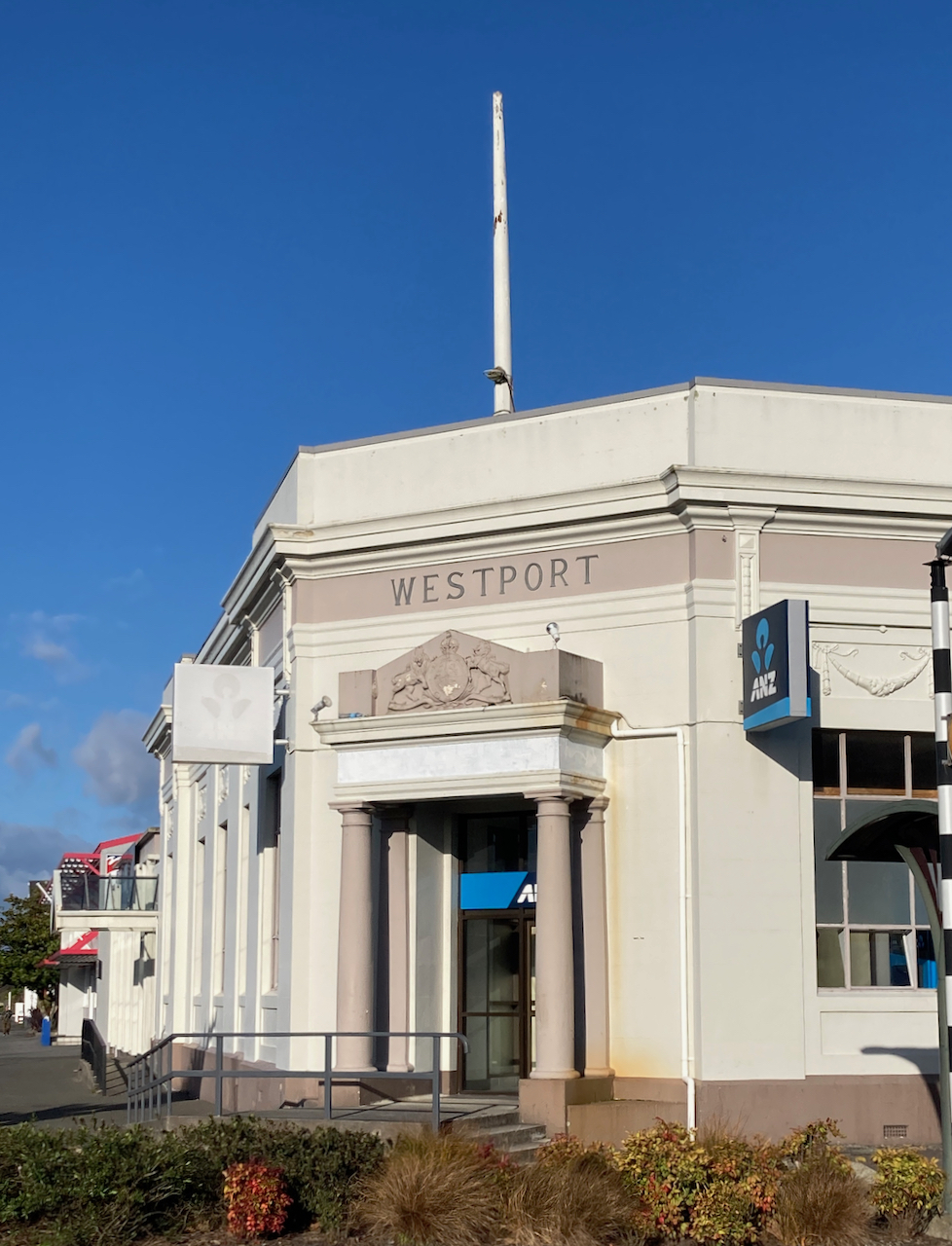
Westport Post Office

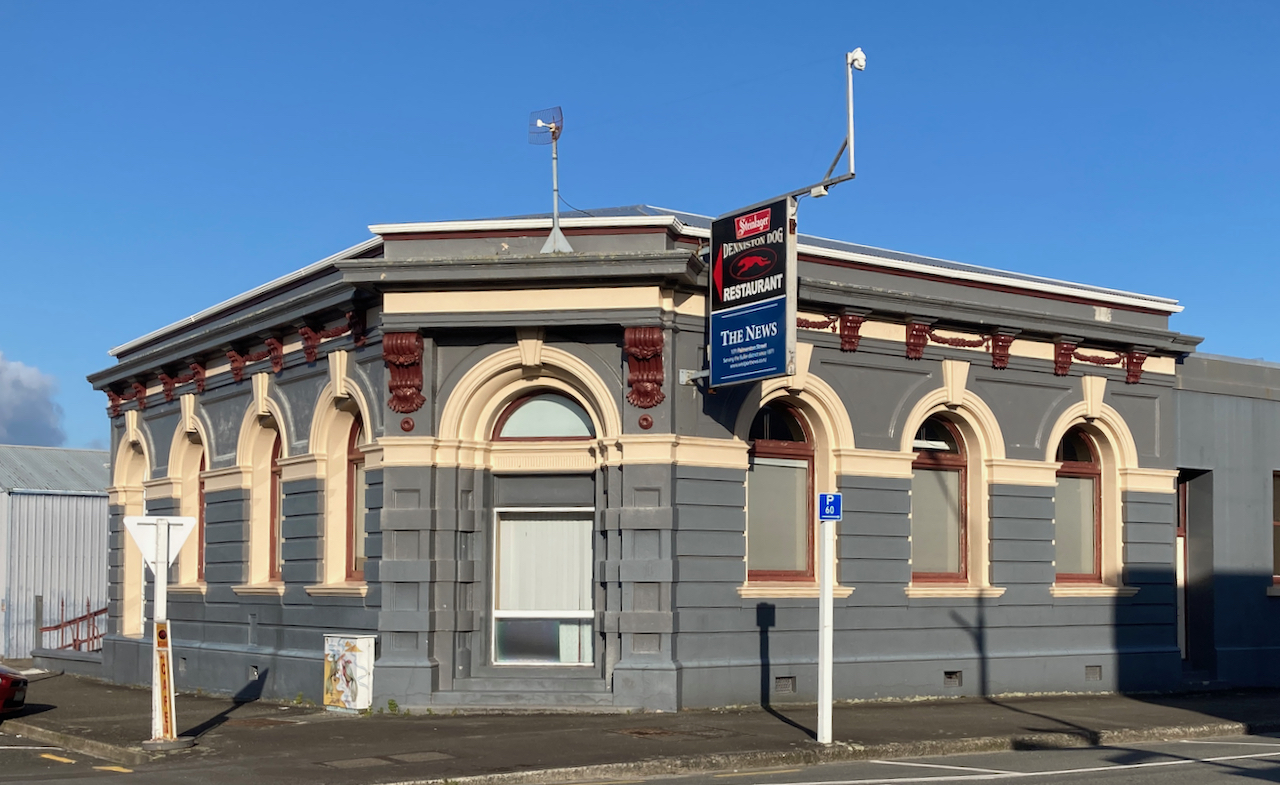
Former Bank of New Zealand building, which now houses the Westport News

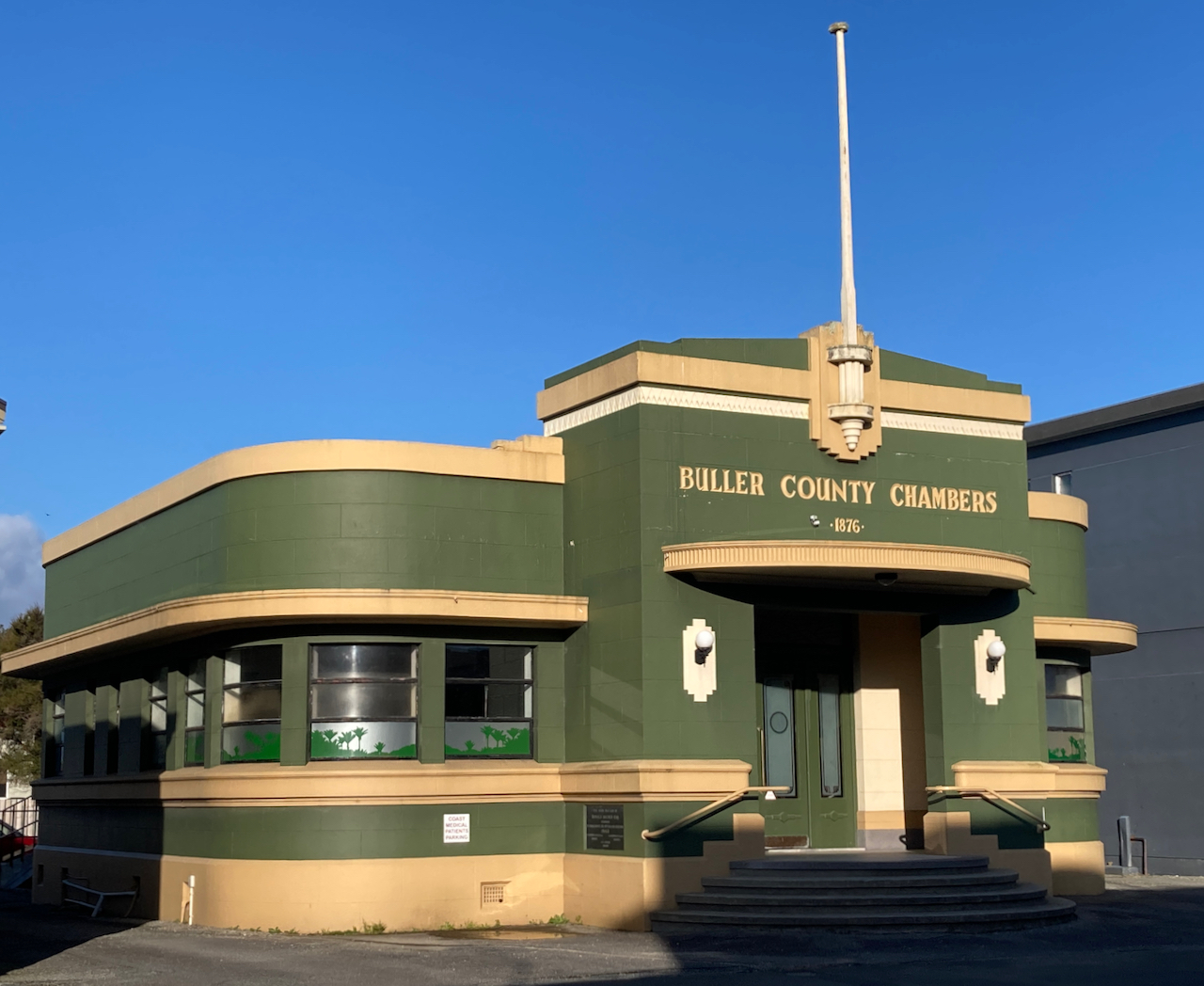
Buller County Chambers

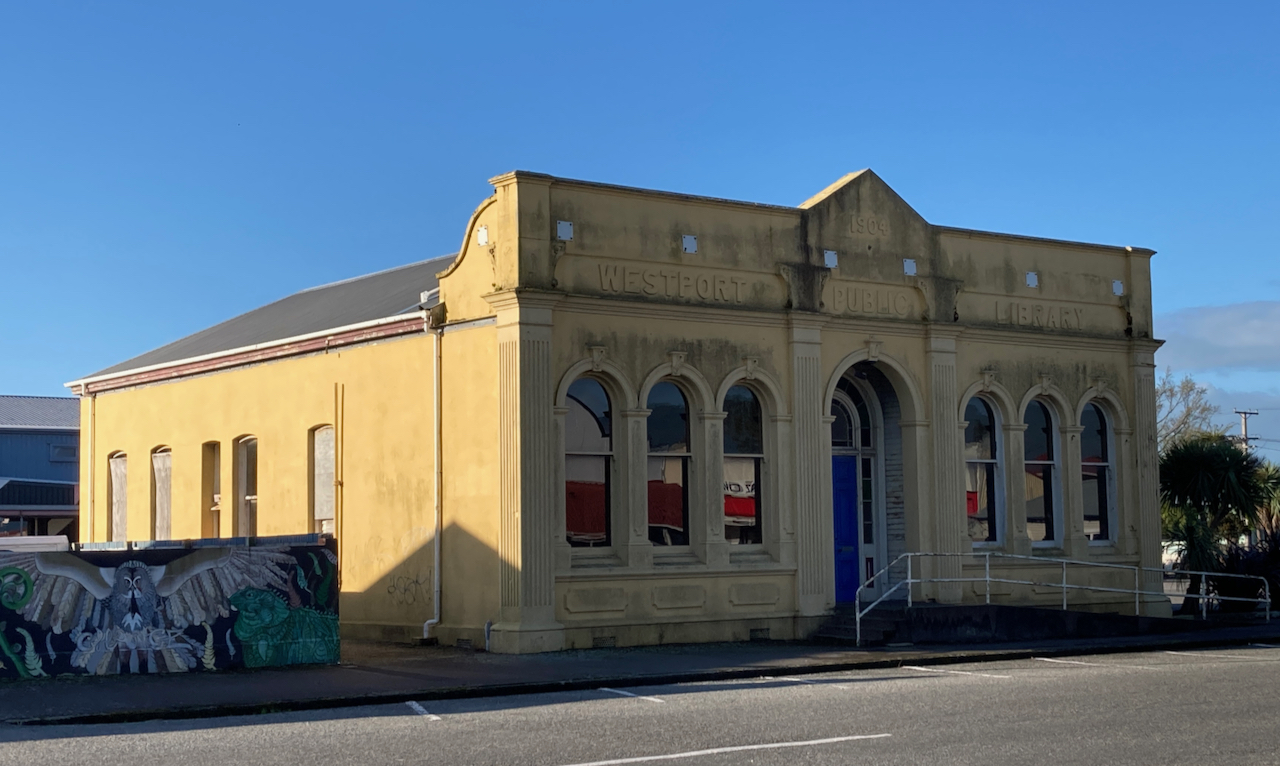
Old Westport Library building

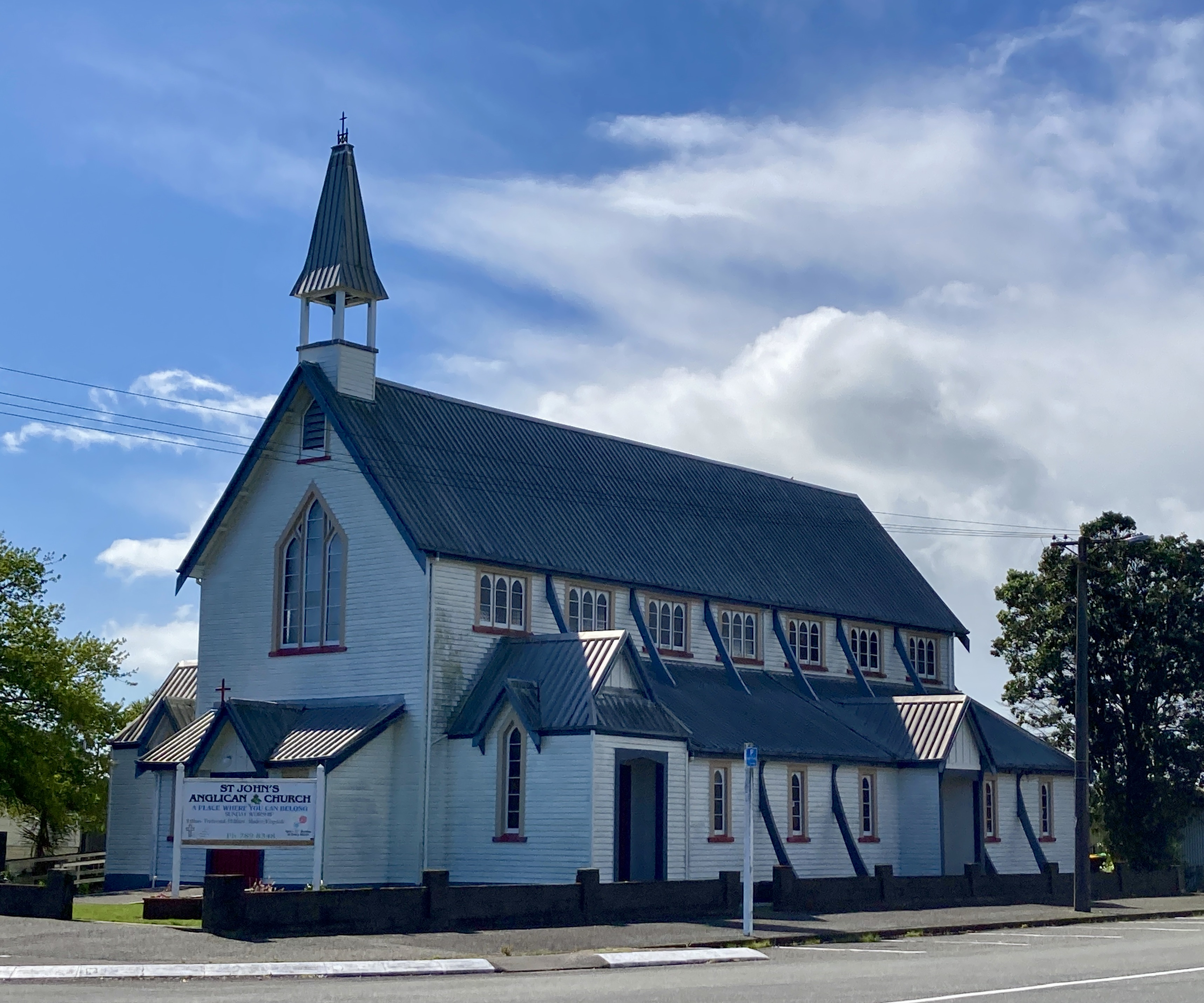
Church of St John the Evangelist

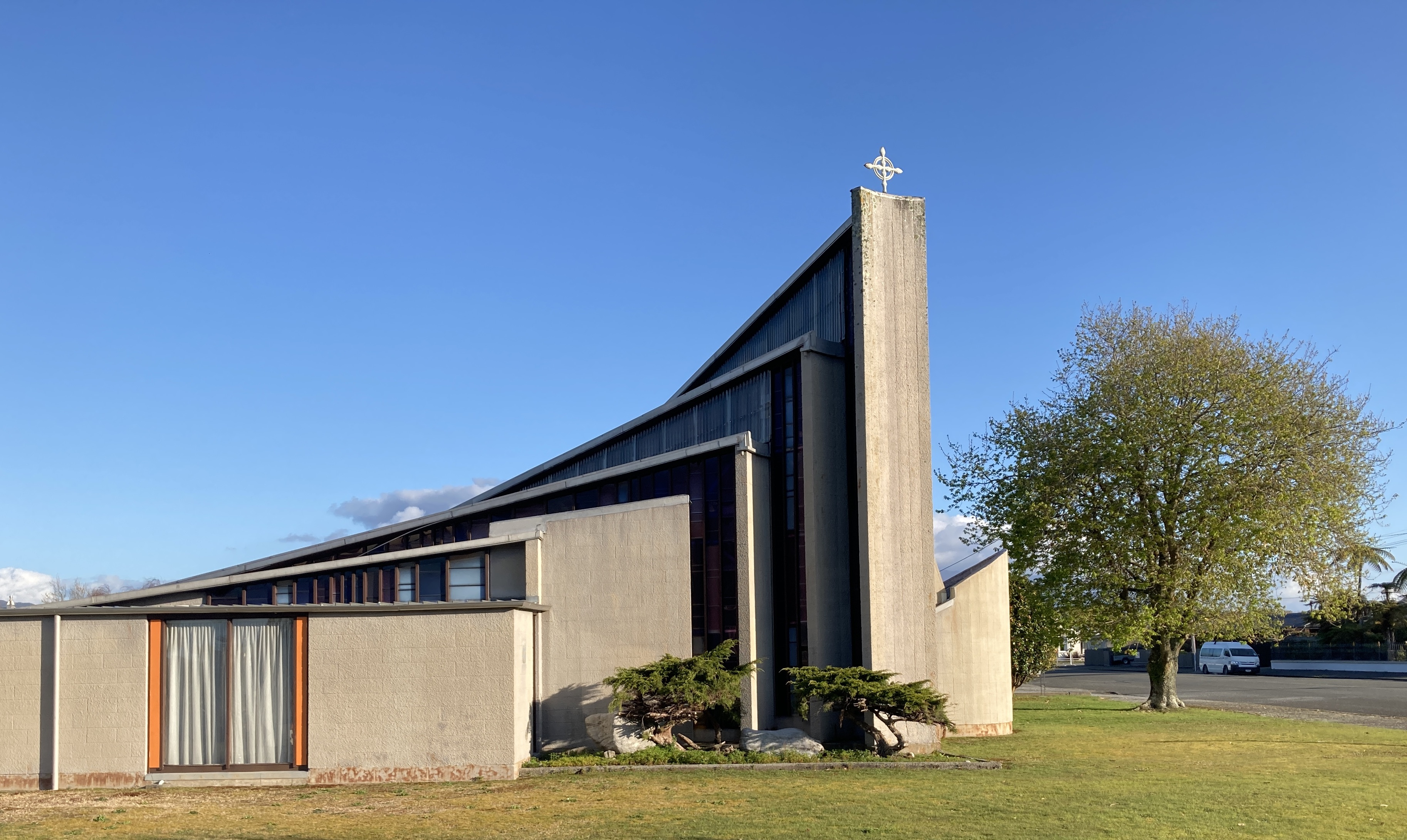
St Canice's Church
