= List of schools of mines =

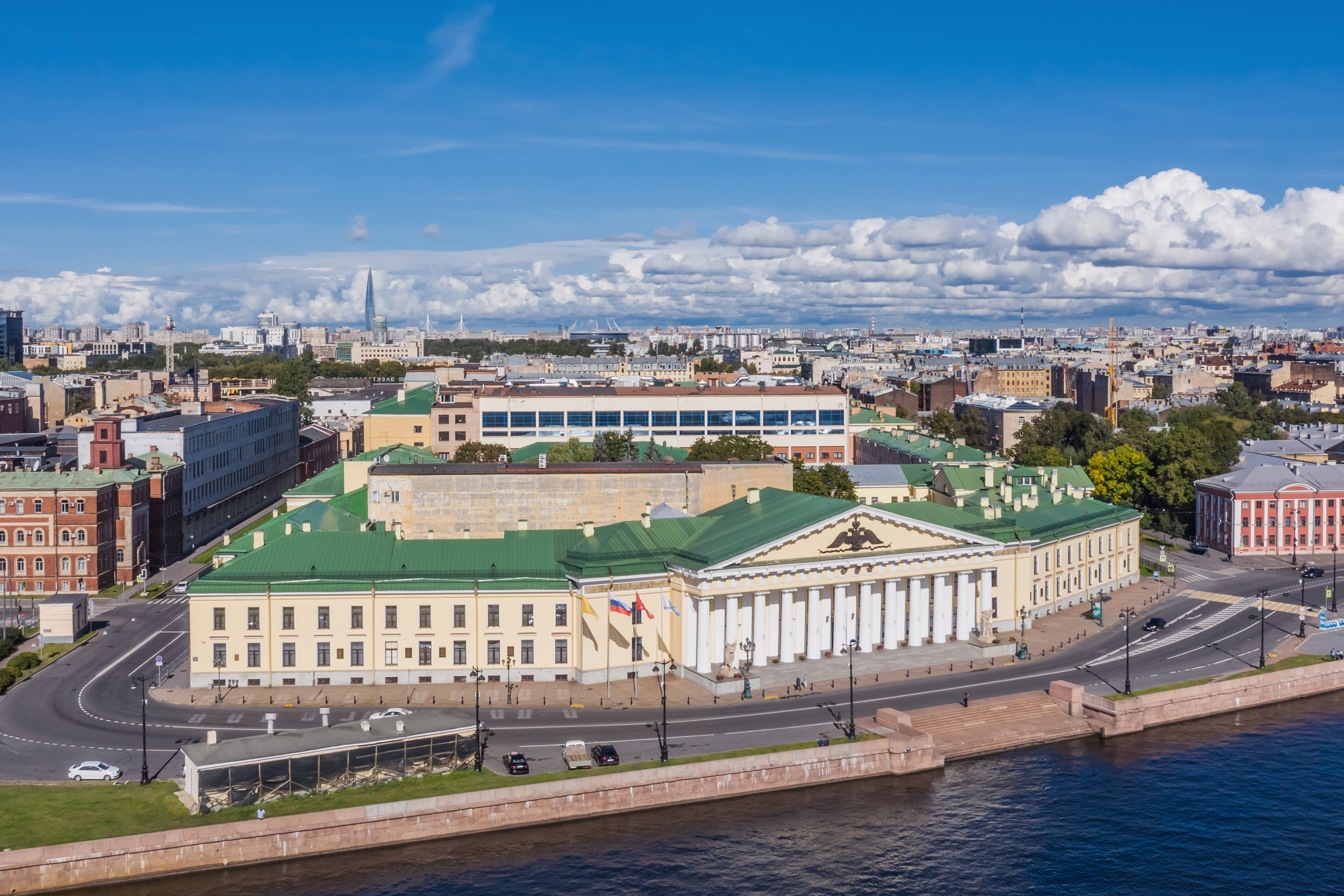
St. Petersburg School of Mines, founded in 1773

A school of mines (or mining school) is an engineering school, often established in the 18th and 19th centuries, that originally focused on mining engineering and applied science. Most have been integrated within larger constructs such as mineral engineering, some no longer focusing primarily on mining subjects, while retaining the name.

== Universities offering degrees in mining engineering ==
=== Africa ===
Institution/University	Department/Faculty	Location	Country	Notes
Larbi Tebessi University	Mining Institute	Tebessa	Algeria	
Badji Mokhtar Annaba University		Annaba	Algeria	
National High School of Mines and Metallurgy		Annaba	Algeria	
Botswana International University of Science and Technology		Palapye	Botswana	
National Higher Polytechnic Institute of the University of Bamenda (NAHPI)		Bamenda	Cameroon	
Ecole de geologie et d'exploitation miniere de l'université de Ngaoundéré (EGEM)		Ngaoundéré	Cameroon	
Agenla Academy		Yaounde	Cameroon	
Assiut University	Department of Mining and Metallurgical Engineering	Assiut	Egypt	
Cairo University	Department of Mining Engineering	Cairo	Egypt	
Suez University	Mining Department, Faculty of Petroleum & Mining Engineering	Suez	Egypt	
Eritrean EIT	Department of Mining Engineering	Asmara	Eritrea	
Unity University		Gerjii	Ethiopia	
University of Mines and Technology		Tarkwa	Ghana	
Jomo Kenyatta University of Agriculture and Technology		Juja	Kenya	
University of Tripoli	Department of Mining Engineering	Tripoli	Libya	
École Nationale Supérieure des Mines de Rabat (Mines Rabat)		Rabat	Morocco	
Mohammadia School of Engineering	Department of Mineral Engineering	Rabat	Morocco	
University of Namibia	Department of Mining and Metallurgical Engineering, Faculty of Engineering and IT	Ongwediva	Namibia	
Federal University of Technology Akure	Department of Mining Engineering	Akure	Nigeria	
University of Johannesburg		Johannesburg	South Africa	
University of the Witwatersrand		Johannesburg	South Africa	
University of Pretoria		Pretoria	South Africa	
University of South Africa		Pretoria	South Africa	
Blue Nile University	Department of Mining Engineering	Al Roseires	Sudan	
Omdurman Islamic University	Department of mining engineering	Omdurman	Sudan	
University of Dar es Salaam	Department of Chemical and Mining Engineering, College of Engineering and Technology	Dar es Salaam	Tanzania	
University of Dodoma, College of Earth Science	Department of Mining and Mineral processing Engineering	Dodoma	Tanzania	
Copperbelt University	Mines and Mineral Sciences	Kitwe	Zambia	
University of Zambia, School of Mines	Department of Geology, Mining Engineering and Metallurgy and Mineral Processing	Lusaka	Zambia	
Zimbabwe School of Mines		Bulawayo	Zimbabwe	
University of Zimbabwe	Department of Mining Engineering	Harare	Zimbabwe	
Midlands State University		Zvishavane	Zimbabwe	

=== Asia ===
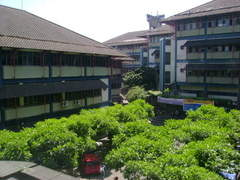
Universitas Islam Bandung, Indonesia

Institution/University	Department/Faculty	Location	Country	Notes
Chittagong University of Engineering & Technology	Department of Petroleum and Mining Engineering	Chattogram	Bangladesh	
Jessore University of Science and Technology	Petroleum and Mining Engineering	Jessore	Bangladesh	
Shahjalal University of Science and Technology		Sylhet	Bangladesh	
Mining & Technology College of Fuxin	Department of Mining Engineering	Fuxin	China	
China University of Mining & Technology	Ministry of Education	Xuzhou	China	
Indian Institute of Technology Dhanbad	Department of Mining Engineering, Department of Mining Machinery Engineering, Centre of Mining Environment	Dhanbad	India	
Birsa Institute of Technology Sindri	Department of Mining Engineering	Jharkhand	India	
Indian Institute of Technology, Kharagpur	Department of Mining Engineering	Kharagpur	India	
University College of Engineering, Kakatiya University	Department of Mining Engineering	Kothagudem	India	
JNTUH College of Engineering Manthani	Department of Mining Engineering	Kukatpally	India	
Government Polytechnic Bhaga	Department of Mining Engineering	Modinagar	India	
Visvesvaraya National Institute of Technology Nagpur	Department of Mining Engineering	Nagpur	India	
National Institute of Technology, Raipur	Department of Mining Engineering	Raipur	India	
National Institute of Technology, Rourkela	Department of Mining Engineering	Rourkela	India	
Indian Institute of Engineering Science and Technology, Shibpur	Department of Mining Engineering	Shibpur	India	
National Institute of Technology, Karnataka	Department of Mining Engineering	Surathkal	India	
Indian Institute of Technology (BHU) Varanasi	Department of Mining Engineering	Varanasi	India	
Bandung Institute of Technology	Mining Department, Faculty of Mining and Petroleum Engineering	Bandung	Indonesia	
Bandung Islamic University	Mining Department, Faculty of Engineering	Bandung	Indonesia	
Trisakti University	Faculty of Earth and Energy Technology	Jakarta	Indonesia	
Medan Institute of Technology	Faculty of Mining And Mineral Technology	Medan	Indonesia	
Padang State University (UNP)	Mining Engineering Department, Faculty of Engineering	Padang	Indonesia	
Sriwijaya University	Mining Engineering	South Sumatra	Indonesia	
Universitas Pembangunan Nasional Veteran Yogyakarta	Faculty of Mineral Technology	Yogyakarta	Indonesia	
Isfahan University of Technology	Department of Mining Engineering	Isfahan	Iran	
University of Kashan	Department of Mining Engineering	Kashan	Iran	
Shahid Bahonar University of Kerman	Department of Mining Engineering	Kerman	Iran	
Imam Khomeini International University	Faculty of Engineering and Technology	Qazvin	Iran	
Shahrood University of Technology	Department of Mining, Petroleum and Geophysics	Semnan	Iran	
Sahand University of Technology	Department of Mining Engineering	Tabriz	Iran	
Amirkabir University of Technology	Department of Mining Engineering	Tehran	Iran	
Islamic Azad University, Science and Research Branch	Department of Mining Engineering	Tehran	Iran	
Islamic Azad University, South Tehran Branch	Department of Mining Engineering	Tehran	Iran	
University of Tehran	Department of Mining Engineering	Tehran	Iran	
Yazd University	Department of Mining and Metallurgy Engineering	Yazd	Iran	
Akita Mining College		Akita	Japan	
Mongolian University of Science and Technology	School of Mining Engineering	Ulaanbaatar	Mongolia	
Mehran University of Engineering and Technology		Jamshoro	Pakistan	
University of Engineering & Technology, Lahore	Department of Mining Engineering	Lahore	Pakistan	
Adamson University	Department of Mining, Geology, and Ceramics Engineering (College of Engineering)	Manila	Philippines	
University of the Philippines Diliman	Department of Mining, Metallurgical and Materials Engineering, College of Engineering	Quezon City	Philippines	
Saint Louis University (Philippines)	Mining Engineering Program, School of Engineering and Architecture	Baguio	Philippines	
Bicol University	Bachelor of Science in Mining Engineering, College of Engineering	Legazpi, Albay	Philippines	
Mindanao State University-Iligan Institute of Technology	Department of Materials and Resources Engineering and Technology	Iligan	Philippines	
University of Southeastern Philippines	Bachelor of Science in Mining Engineering, College of Engineering	Davao City	Philippines	
Caraga State University	Bachelor of Science in Mining Engineering, College of Engineering and Geosciences	Butuan	Philippines	
Saint Paul University Surigao		Surigao City	Philippines	
Cebu Institute of Technology-University		Cebu City	Philippines	
Amur State University		Blagoveshchensk	Russia	Mining, Applied Geology
Transbaikal State University		Chita	Russia	Mining, Applied Geology, Geological Exploration
Irkutsk National Research State University		Irkutsk	Russia	Applied Geology
Irkutsk National Research Technical University		Irkutsk	Russia	Mining, Applied Geology, Geological Exploration
Kuzbass State Technical University		Kemerovo	Russia	Mining
Pacific National University		Khabarovsk	Russia	Mining
Siberian Federal University	School of Mining, Geology and Geotechnology	Krasnoyarsk	Russia	Mining, Applied Geology, Geological Exploration
Tuvan State University		Kyzyl	Russia	Mining
North-Eastern State University		Magadan	Russia	Mining, Applied Geology
N. M. Fedorovsky Polar State University		Norilsk	Russia	Mining
Siberian State Industrial University		Novokuznetsk	Russia	Mining
Siberian State University of Geosystems and Technologies		Novosibirsk	Russia	Mining
Tomsk Polytechnic University		Tomsk	Russia	Mining
Tomsk State University		Tomsk	Russia	Applied Geology
East Siberia State University of Technology and Management		Ulan-Ude	Russia	Mining
Far Eastern Federal University		Vladivostok	Russia	Mining
Ammosov North-Eastern Federal University		Yakutsk	Russia	Mining, Applied Geology, Geological Exploration
Dong-A University	Department of Energy & Mineral Resources Engineering, Faculty of Engineering	Busan	South Korea	
Inha University	Department of Energy Resources Engineering, Faculty of Engineering,	Incheon	South Korea	
University of Moratuwa	Department of Earth Resources Engineering	Moratuwa	Sri Lanka	
Chiang Mai University	Department of Mining and Petroleum Engineering, Faculty of Engineering	Chiang Mai	Thailand	
Rajamangala University of Technology Lanna	School of Mining Engineering, Faculty of Engineering	Chiang Mai	Thailand	
Prince of Songkla University	Department of Mining and Materials Engineering, Faculty of Engineering	Hat Yai	Thailand	
Zonguldak Karaelmas University	Department of Mining Engineering	Zonguldak	Turkey	

=== Europe ===
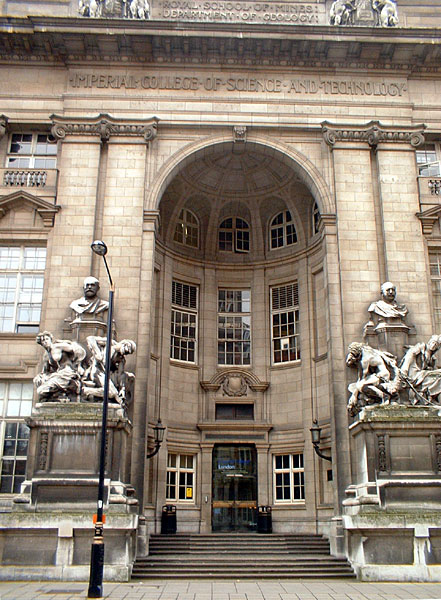
Main entrance of the Royal School of Mines of Imperial College London, (London, UK)

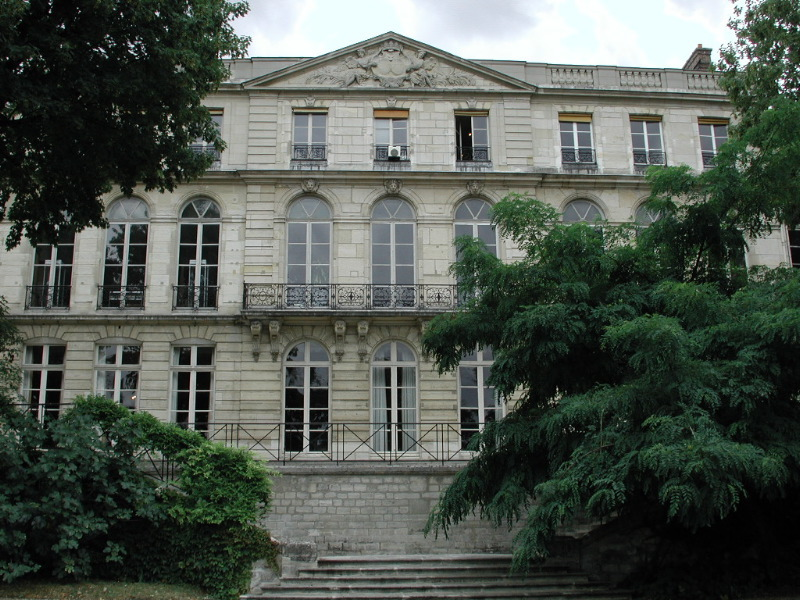
The Hôtel de Vendôme, central building of École des Mines, Paris

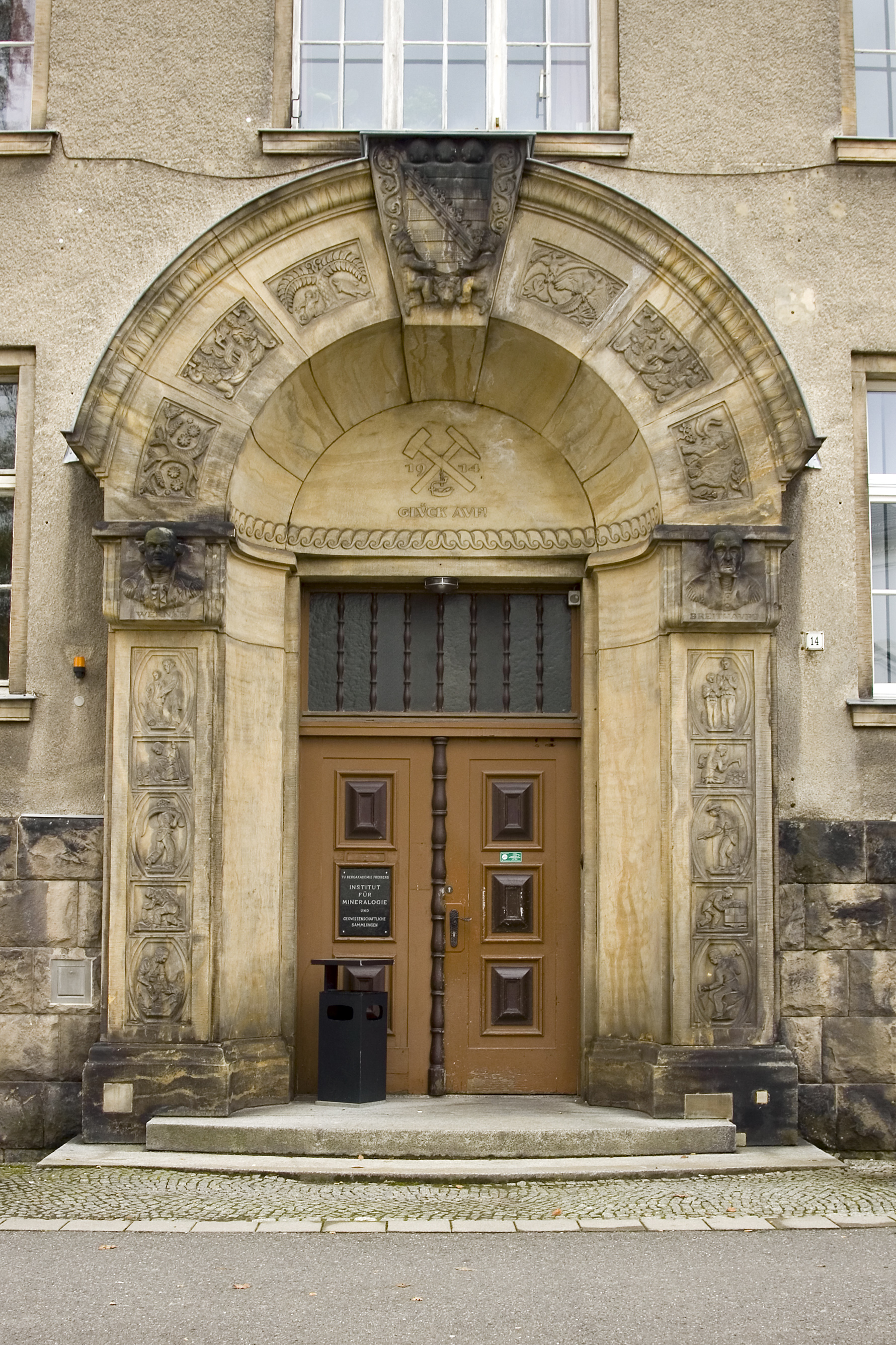
Mineralogical Institute, Technische Universität Bergakademie Freiberg

Institution/University	Department/Faculty	Location	Country	Notes
University of Leoben		Leoben	Austria	
Université de Liège	Faculty of Applied Sciences - Mining & Geology	Liège	Belgium	
Katholieke Universiteit Leuven	Department of Natural Resources	Leuven	Belgium	
Faculté polytechnique de Mons	Faculty of Mining Engineering	Mons	Belgium	
University of Banja Luka	Mining faculty	Banja Luka	Bosnia and Herzegovina	founded in 1997
University of Tuzla	Faculty of Mining, Geology and Civil Engineering	Tuzla	Bosnia and Herzegovina	
University of Mining and Geology		Sofia	Bulgaria	
University of Zagreb	Faculty of Mining, Geology and Petroleum Engineering	Zagreb	Croatia	
Technical University of Ostrava	Faculty of Mining and Geology	Ostrava	Czech Republic	
Tallinn University of Technology	Chair of Mining Engineering, Department of Mining	Tallinn	Estonia	
Helsinki University of Technology		Helsinki	Finland	
École des mines d'Albi-Carmaux	Groupe des écoles des mines (GEM)	Albi	France	
École des Mines d'Alès	Groupe des écoles des mines (GEM)	Alès	France	
École des Mines de Douai	Groupe des écoles des mines (GEM)	Douai	France	
École Nationale Supérieure de Géologie		Nancy	France	
École Nationale Supérieure des Mines de Nancy	Groupe des écoles des mines (GEM)	Nancy	France	
École des Mines de Nantes	Groupe des écoles des mines (GEM)	Nantes	France	
Mines Paris – PSL	Groupe des écoles des mines (GEM)	Paris	France	
École Nationale Supérieure des Mines de Saint-Étienne	Groupe des écoles des mines (GEM)	Saint-Étienne	France	
RWTH Aachen University		Aachen	Germany	
TH Georg Agricola		Bochum	Germany	
Technische Universität Clausthal		Clausthal-Zellerfeld	Germany	
Technische Universität Bergakademie Freiberg		Freiberg	Germany	oldest academy of mining in the world, founded in 1765
National Technical University of Athens	Faculty of Mining Engineering and Metallurgy	Athens	Greece	
Technical University of Crete	Faculty of Mining Resources Engineering	Crete	Greece	
University of Western Macedonia	Department of Mineral Resources Engineering	Kozani	Greece	
University of Miskolc	Faculty of Mining and Geotechnical Engineering	Miskolc	Hungary	Founded in 1735
Politecnico di Torino		Turin	Italy	First Italian mining school, founded in 1907
Technische Universiteit Delft		Delft	Netherlands	
Norwegian University of Science and Technology	Department of Geology and Mineral Resources Engineering	Trondheim	Norway	
Silesian University of Technology	Faculty of Mining and Geology	Gliwice	Poland	
AGH University of Science and Technology		Kraków	Poland	Founded in 1919, formerly AGH University of Mining and Metallurgy
Wrocław University of Technology	Faculty of Geoengineering, Mining and Geology	Wrocław	Poland	
University of Coimbra	Faculdade de Ciências e Tecnologia	Coimbra	Portugal	
University of Lisbon	Instituto Superior Técnico	Lisbon	Portugal	
University of Porto	Faculdade de Engenharia	Porto	Portugal	
University of Petroșani	Facultatea de Mine	Petroșani	Romania	
University of León	Escuela Técnica Superior de Ingeniería de Minas de León	León	Spain	
University of Oviedo	Escuela Técnica Superior de Ingenieros de Minas de Oviedo	Oviedo	Spain	
University of Vigo	Escuela Técnica Superior de Ingeniería de Minas de Vigo	Vigo, Pontevedra	Spain	
School of Mining Engineering of Madrid		Madrid	Spain	
Polytechnic University of Catalonia	Manresa School of Engineering	Manresa	Spain	
University of Petrosani	Faculty of Mines	Petrosani	Romania	founded in 1948
Northern (Arctic) Federal University	Department of Geotechnics	Arkhangelsk	Russia	Mining
Astrakhan State Technical University		Astrakhan	Russia	Applied Geology
Belgorod State University		Belgorod	Russia	Mining, Applied Geology
Belgorod Technological University		Belgorod	Russia	Mining
Dubna State University		Dubna	Russia	Geological Exploration
Grozny State Oil Technical University		Grozny	Russia	Applied Geology, Geological Exploration
Udmurt State University		Izhevsk	Russia	Applied Geology
Kazan National Research Technological University		Kazan	Russia	Mining
South-West State University		Kursk	Russia	Mining
Magnitogorsk State Technical University		Magnitogorsk	Russia	Mining
Gubkin Russian State University of Oil and Gas		Moscow	Russia	Applied Geology
Moscow Polytechnic University		Moscow	Russia	Mining
University of Science and Technology MISIS (Moscow State Mining University)		Moscow	Russia	Founded in 1918 like Moscow Mining Academy, Mining. (now, University of Science and Technology MISIS from 2014, branch –Technological Institute named after A. A. Ugarov in Stary Oskol; branch in Gubkin, Belgorod region)
Patrice Lumumba Peoples' Friendship University of Russia		Moscow	Russia	Mining, Applied Geology
Russian State Geological Prospecting University		Moscow	Russia	Mining, Applied Geology, Geological Exploration
Murmansk Arctic State University		Murmansk	Russia	Mining
South Russian State Polytechnic University	Faculty of Geology, Mining and Oil and Gas	Novocherkassk	Russia	Mining
Orenburg State University		Orenburg	Russia	Applied Geology
Perm National Research Polytechnic University	Faculty of Mining and Oil & Gas	Perm	Russia	Mining, Applied Geology
Petrozavodsk State University		Petrozavodsk	Russia	Mining
Southern Federal University		Rostov-on-Don	Russia	Applied Geology
Saint Petersburg Mining Institute		Saint Petersburg	Russia	founded in 1773
Samara State Technical University		Samara	Russia	Applied Geology
Saratov State University		Saratov	Russia	Applied Geology
North-Caucasus Federal University		Stavropol	Russia	Applied Geology, Geological Exploration
Tula State University	Institute of Mining and Construction	Tula	Russia	Mining
Tver State University		Tver	Russia	Mining
Industrial University of Tyumen		Tyumen	Russia	Mining, Applied Geology, Geological Exploration
Ukhta State Technical University		Ukhta	Russia	Mining, Applied Geology, Geological Exploration
Bashkir State University		Ufa	Russia	Geological Exploration
Technical University of UMMC		Verkhnyaya Pyshma	Russia	Mining
North Caucasus Mining and Metallurgical Institute		Vladikavkaz	Russia	Mining, Applied Geology
Ural State Mining University		Yekaterinburg	Russia	Mining, Applied Geology, Geological Exploration
University of Belgrade	Faculty of Mining and Geology	Belgrade	Serbia	
University of Belgrade	Technical faculty in Bor	Bor	Serbia	
The Swedish School of Mining and Metallurgy		Filipstad	Sweden	
Adana Science and Technology University	Mining and Mineral Processing Engineering Department	Adana	Turkey	
Middle East Technical University	Mining Engineering Department	Ankara	Turkey	
Eskişehir Osmangazi University	Mining Engineering Department	Eskişehir	Turkey	
Istanbul University	Faculty of Engineering	Istanbul	Turkey	
Istanbul Technical University	Faculty of Mines	Istanbul	Turkey	
Royal School of Mines		London, England	United Kingdom	now part of Imperial College London
Camborne School of Mines		Cornwall, England	United Kingdom	now part of the University of Exeter
University of South Wales	School of Engineering	Treforest, Wales	United Kingdom	Formerly the South Wales and Monmouthshire School of Mines
Dnipro Polytechnic		Dnipro	Ukraine	
Donetsk National Technical University	Mining Faculty	Pokrovsk	Ukraine	
Ivano-Frankivsk National Technical University of Oil and Gas		Ivano-Frankivsk	Ukraine	

=== North America ===
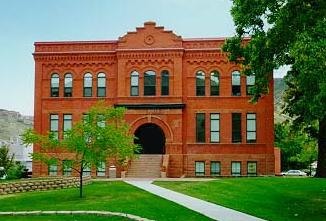
Engineering Hall (built in 1894) at the Colorado School of Mines

Institution/University	Department/Faculty	Location	Country	Notes
University of Alberta	School of Mining & Petroleum Engineering	Edmonton, Alberta	Canada	
British Columbia Institute of Technology		Burnaby, British Columbia	Canada	Mining and Mineral Resource Engineering
University of British Columbia	Norman B. Keevil Institute of Mining Engineering	Vancouver, British Columbia	Canada	
Dalhousie University		Halifax, Nova Scotia	Canada	
Queen's University at Kingston	The Robert M. Buchan Department of Mining Engineering	Kingston, Ontario	Canada	
University of Toronto	Lassonde Mineral Engineering	Toronto, Ontario	Canada	
Laurentian University		Sudbury, Ontario	Canada	
Northern College	Haileybury School of Mines	Timmins, Ontario	Canada	
Polytechnique Montréal		Montreal, Quebec	Canada	
McGill University		Montreal, Quebec	Canada	
Université Laval		Quebec City, Quebec	Canada	
University of Saskatchewan		Saskatoon, Saskatchewan	Canada	Mining Options in Geological, Chemical and Mechanical Engineering
University of Alaska Fairbanks	College of Engineering and Mines	Fairbanks, Alaska	United States	ABET-accredited
University of Arizona	Department of Mining & Geological Engineering	Tucson, Arizona	United States	ABET-accredited
Colorado School of Mines		Golden, Colorado	United States	ABET-accredited. Mining Engineering
Southern Illinois University Carbondale		Carbondale, Illinois	United States	ABET-accredited
University of Kentucky		Lexington, Kentucky	United States	ABET-accredited
Michigan Technological University		Houghton, Michigan	United States	ABET-accredited. Offers a graduate program (MS and PhD) in Mining Engineering
Missouri University of Science and Technology		Rolla, Missouri	United States	ABET-accredited
Montana Technological University		Butte, Montana	United States	ABET-accredited
University of North Dakota	College of Engineering and Mines	Grand Forks, North Dakota	United States	ABET-accredited
University of Nevada, Reno		Reno, Nevada	United States	ABET-accredited
New Mexico Institute of Mining and Technology		Socorro, New Mexico	United States	ABET-accredited
Columbia University	Fu Foundation School of Engineering and Applied Science	New York City, New York	United States	ABET-accredited
Oregon State University		Corvallis, Oregon	United States	Was the home of the Oregon School of Mines 1912-1932
Pennsylvania State University		University Park, Pennsylvania	United States	ABET-accredited
South Dakota School of Mines and Technology		Rapid City, South Dakota	United States	ABET-accredited
University of Utah	Department of Mining Engineering	Salt Lake City, Utah	United States	ABET-accredited
Virginia Polytechnic Institute and State University	Department of Mining and Minerals Engineering	Blacksburg, Virginia	United States	ABET-accredited
West Virginia University		Morgantown, West Virginia	United States	ABET-accredited

=== Oceania ===
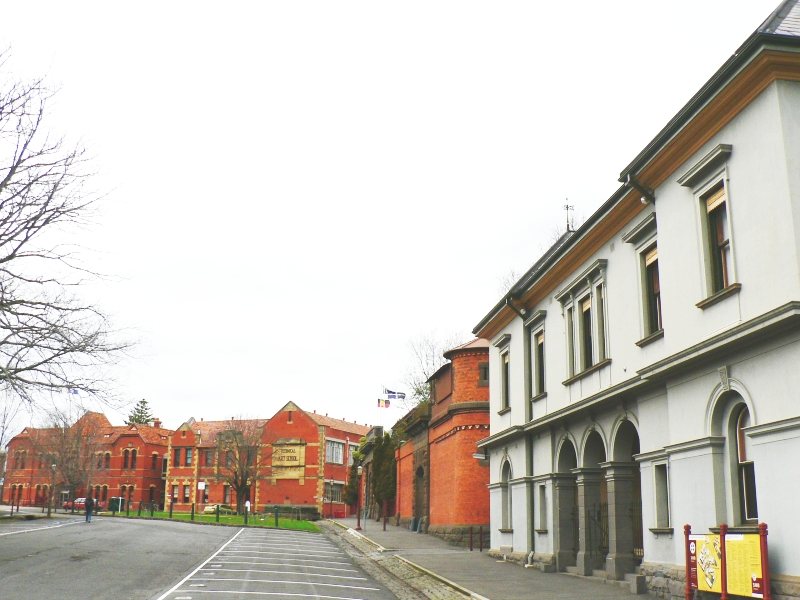
School of Mines and Industry, University of Ballarat, Victoria

Institution/University	Department/Faculty	Location	Country	Notes
University of Adelaide	School of Civil, Environmental and Mining Engineering	Adelaide	Australia	
University of South Australia		Adelaide	Australia	South Australian School of Mines and Industries, established 1889
University of Ballarat	School of Science and Engineering	Ballarat	Australia	
University of Queensland	School of Mining Engineering	Brisbane	Australia	
Western Australian School of Mines		Kalgoorlie	Australia	
Monash University	Division of Mining & Resources Engineering Department of Civil Engineering	Melbourne	Australia	
University of Western Australia	School of Civil, Environmental and Mining Engineering	Perth	Australia	
University of New South Wales	School of Mining Engineering	Sydney	Australia	
University of Wollongong		Wollongong	Australia	
Reefton School of Mines	(closed 1970)	Reefton	New Zealand	
Thames School of Mines	(closed 1954)	Thames	New Zealand	
University of Otago	School of Mines (transferred to University of Auckland 1987)	Dunedin	New Zealand	

=== South America ===
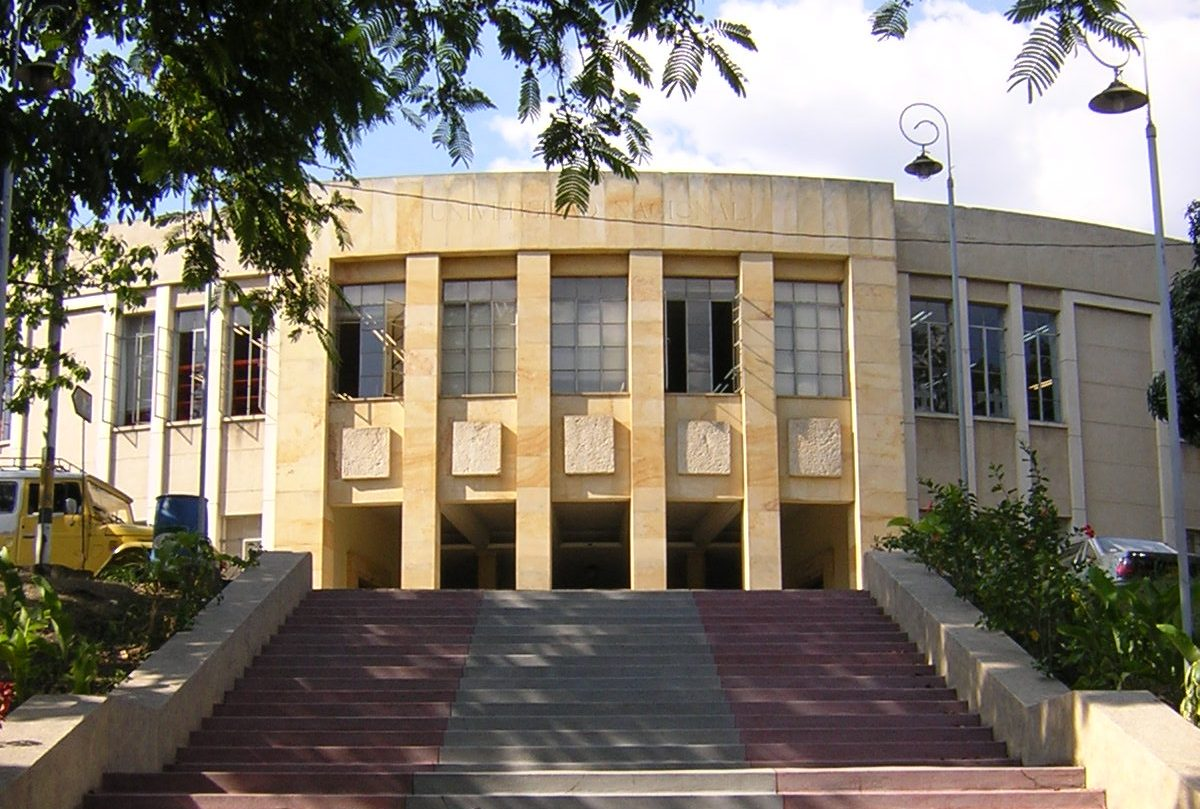
Bloque M5 Faculty of Mines - Universidad Nacional de Colombia, designed by Pedro Nel Gómez

Institution/University	Department/Faculty	Location	Country	Notes
National University of San Juan	Departamento de Ingeniería de Minas	San Juan	Argentina	
Federal University of Bahia	Department of Mining Engineering	Salvador, Bahia	Brazil	
Faculdades Kennedy		Belo Horizonte, Minas Gerais	Brazil	
Federal University of Minas Gerais	Department of Mining Engineering	Belo Horizonte, Minas Gerais	Brazil	
Minas Gerais State University	Faculdade de Engenharia	João Monlevade, Minas Gerais	Brazil	
Federal University of Ouro Preto	Escola de Minas de Ouro Preto	Ouro Preto, Minas Gerais	Brazil	
Federal University of Alfenas	Instituto de Ciência e Tecnologia	Poços de Caldas, Minas Gerais	Brazil	
Federal University of Campina Grande	Unidade Acadêmica de Mineração e Geologia	Campina Grande, Paraíba	Brazil	
Federal University of Pernambuco	Department of Mining Engineering	Recife, Pernambuco	Brazil	
Federal University of Rio Grande do Sul	Department of Mining Engineering	Porto Alegre, Rio Grande do Sul	Brazil	
University of São Paulo	Escola Politécnica	São Paulo, São Paulo	Brazil	
Catholic University of the North	Departamento de Ingeniería Metalúrgica y Minas	Antofagasta	Chile	
University of Concepción	Departamento de Ingeniería Metalúrgica	Concepción	Chile	
University of Atacama	Departamento de Minas	Copiapó	Chile	
University of La Serena	Departamento de Ingeniería en Minas	La Serena	Chile	
Pontifical Catholic University of Chile	Departamento de Ingeniería de Minería	Santiago	Chile	
University of Chile	Mining Engineering Department	Santiago	Chile	
University of Santiago, Chile	Departamento de Ingeniería en Minas	Santiago	Chile	
Francisco de Paula Santander University	Departamento de Ingeniería de Minas	Cúcuta	Colombia	
National University of Colombia	Faculty of Mines	Medellín	Colombia	
Universidad del Azuay	Department of Mining Engineering	Cuenca	Ecuador	
Escuela de Minería y Gerencia de Sudamérica		Lima	Peru	
National University of Engineering	Escuela de Ingeniería de Minas	Lima	Peru	
National University of San Marcos	Escuela Académico Profesional de Ingeniería de Minas	Lima	Peru	
Pontifical Catholic University of Peru	Department of Mining Engineering	Lima	Peru	
Universidad de Oriente - Núcleo de Bolívar	Department of Mining Engineering	Ciudad Bolívar	Venezuela	

== See also ==
- List of colleges of natural resources
- Ranking QS 2019, Subject: Engineering - Mineral and Mining.
