= Kyzyl =

Capital of the Tuva Republic, Russia

Kyzyl Кызыл
- City

Other transcription(s)
  - Tuvan: Кызыл
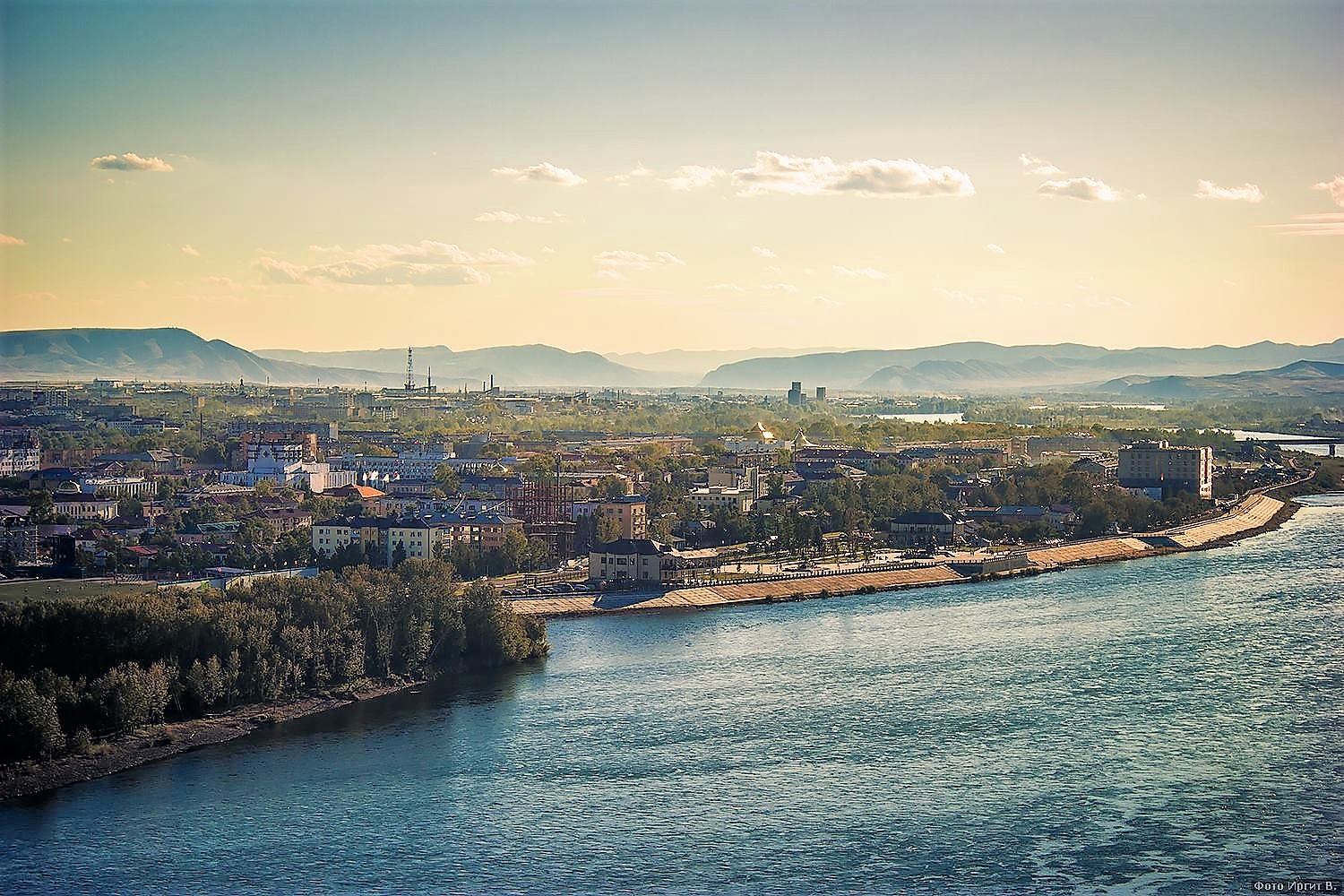
- View of Kyzyl

- Flag Coat of arms
- Interactive map of Kyzyl
- Location of Kyzyl Kyzyl (Tuva Republic)
- Coordinates: 51°43′N 94°27′E
- Country: Russia
- Federal subject: Tuva
- Founded: 1914
- City status since: 1914

Government
  - Mayor: Karim Baylak-oolovich Sagaan-ool
- Elevation: 630 m (2,070 ft)

Population (2010 Census)
  - Total: 109,918
  - Estimate (2025): 131,981 (+20.1%)
  - Rank: 146th in 2010

Administrative status
  - Subordinated to: city under republic jurisdiction (urban okrug) of Kyzyl
  - Capital of: Tuva
  - Capital of: city under republic jurisdiction (urban okrug) of Kyzyl

Municipal status
  - Urban okrug: Kyzyl Urban Okrug
  - Capital of: Kyzyl Urban Okrug
- Time zone: UTC+7 (MSK+4)
- Postal codes: 667000–667005, 667007–667012, 667700, 667899, 667961, 667965, 667966, 667970, 667999
- Dialing code: +7 39422
- OKTMO ID: 93701000001
- Website: mkyzyl.ru

Kyzyl (Note: English: /kɪˈzɪl, kə-/ kiz-IL, kə-; Russian and Tuvan: Кызыл; Russian pronunciation: [kɨˈzɨl]; Tuvan pronunciation: [qɤ.zɤɫ]) (Note: The name of the city translates to 'red' or 'crimson' in Tuvan. Similar cognates exist in many other Turkic languages.) is the capital and most populous city of the Republic of Tuva within the Russian Federation. Kyzyl's population is approximately 120,067 (2021 census);

== History ==
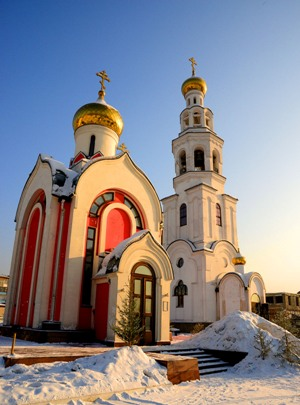
Resurrection Cathedral

The city was founded in 1914 as Belotsarsk. (Note: Russian: Белоцарск, pronounced [bʲɪɫɐˈt͡sarsk]; lit. 'White Tsar Town') It was renamed Khem-Beldir (Note: Tuvan: Хем-Белдир, [xèm pèltɪɾ]) from 1918 to 1926. When the city was the capital of Tannu Tuva, it was named Kyzyl Hoto. In September 2014, Kyzyl celebrated its 100th anniversary as a city.

Years	Titles	Affiliation
1914–1917	Belotsarsk	Uryankhay Krai (protectorate of the Russian Empire)
1921–1944	Khem-Beldir, Kyzyl	Tuvan People's Republic (partially recognized state)
1944–1991	Kyzyl	Soviet Union
since 1991	Kyzyl	Russia

The city was founded in 1914 by Russian settlers immediately after the creation of the Uryankhay Krai (a protectorate of the Russian Empire), and called Belotsarsk.

In the center of the Uryankhay region, at the confluence of the two Yenisei, the Big and Small, on a large elevated plain, I have designed the administrative center of the region, the future city of Belotsarsk. This name was given in honor of the Sovereign Leader of the Russian people, known to the Uryankhs under the name "Tsagan-Khan", which means White Tsar ...

— Vladimir Gabaev, head of the Russian population in Tuva

In 1918, in connection with the communist revolution and the anti-tsarist movement, it was renamed to Khem-Beldir (Tuv.: confluence of rivers), and in 1926, to Kyzyl (Tuv.: red).

Between 1921 and 1944, the city was the capital of the Tuvan People's Republic. From 1944 to 1961, it was the capital of the RSFSR's Tuvan Autonomous Oblast. From 1961 to 1991, it was the capital of the Tuvan ASSR, and since 1991, the capital of the Republic of Tyva.

Settlers began to lay a new city in the village of Vilany. Technological engineer K.V. Goguntsov and topographer M. Ya. Kryuchkov arrived in February 1914. Kryuchkov drew a general plan of the city of Belotsarsk (fund 123, inventory 2, file 21), which can still be seen in the layout of central Kyzyl today. The city plan enumerated the land plots and named their owners. In May 1914, the head of the Russian population in Uryankhai approved the draft rules on the allotment of land plots and the organization of a committee for the improvement of the future city. The very first plots were allocated for houses of officials, administration, homes of honorary Uryankhs, a treasury, post and telegraph offices, and the state fire shed.

The city was built by recruited workers from Krasnoyarsk, Minusinsk, Tomsk, and other cities of Siberia; Tuvan farm laborers; and Russian workers who fled from gold mines because of difficult working and living conditions.

On 4 July 1915, the Commissioner for the Uryankhay Krai, V. Yu. Grigoriev, wrote a letter to the Head of the Russian population in the Uryankhay Krai, requesting that a museum be constructed in the city of Belotsarsk (fund 123, inventory 2, file 53, sheets 25–26).

At the IV Uryankhay Regional Congress on March 11, 1918, a decree was issued to rename Belotsarsk to Uryankhaysk. However, this name did not stick, as many still called the city Belotsarsk.

The Revolution of 1917 did not leave the city unscathed. During a major battle between the detachment of P.E. Schetinkin and A.D. Kravchenko (communist forces) and the Kolchak men (tsarist forces) under the command of the captain G.K. Bologov at the end of August 1919, the city was almost completely burned down. The 10th Congress of Representatives of the Russian Population of Tuva (16–20 September 1920) gathered in the village of Turan, in the Uryankhai region. At this Congress, participants decided to restore the city and rename it as Kyzyl.

On 13 August 1921, in the town of Sug-Bazhy (the village of Kochetovo), the Vsetuvinsky Constituent Khural of Representatives of all Khoshuns (khoshun was an administrative-territorial unit at that time) of Tuva gathered. This gathering proclaimed the creation of an independent state – the Tuvan People's Republic. In March 1922, the Tuvan government, the Central Committee of the Tuvan People's Revolutionary Party (Central Committee of the TPRP), and the executive committee of the Russian Self-Governing Labor Colony (RSTK) were transferred to the restored Kyzyl. In the spring of 1922, the city of Kyzyl became the capital of the Tuvan People's Republic (TPR).

In 1924, the Tuvan Central Cooperative (Tuvintsenkoop, TCC) was formed, which played a significant role in the development of industrial production and domestic and foreign trade. In 1925, the Tuvan National Bank (Tuvinbank) was founded. In Kyzyl, enterprises for the processing of agricultural raw materials were organized, and in 1928, a shoemaker's workshop opened. In 1929, the Kyzyl printing house was opened, and the transport organization "Soyuztrans" was created. Two years later, the Soyuztrans truck fleet consisted of 31 vehicles. In 1931, a telephone exchange for 30 subscribers was opened in the city of Kyzyl. Between 1930 and 1931, a sausage workshop, a pimokatny (a felt workshop), and a tailoring workshop were built. In the early 1940s, a mill, a sawmill, a power station and a brick factory operated in Kyzyl, and sheepskin and fur production began.

== Geography ==
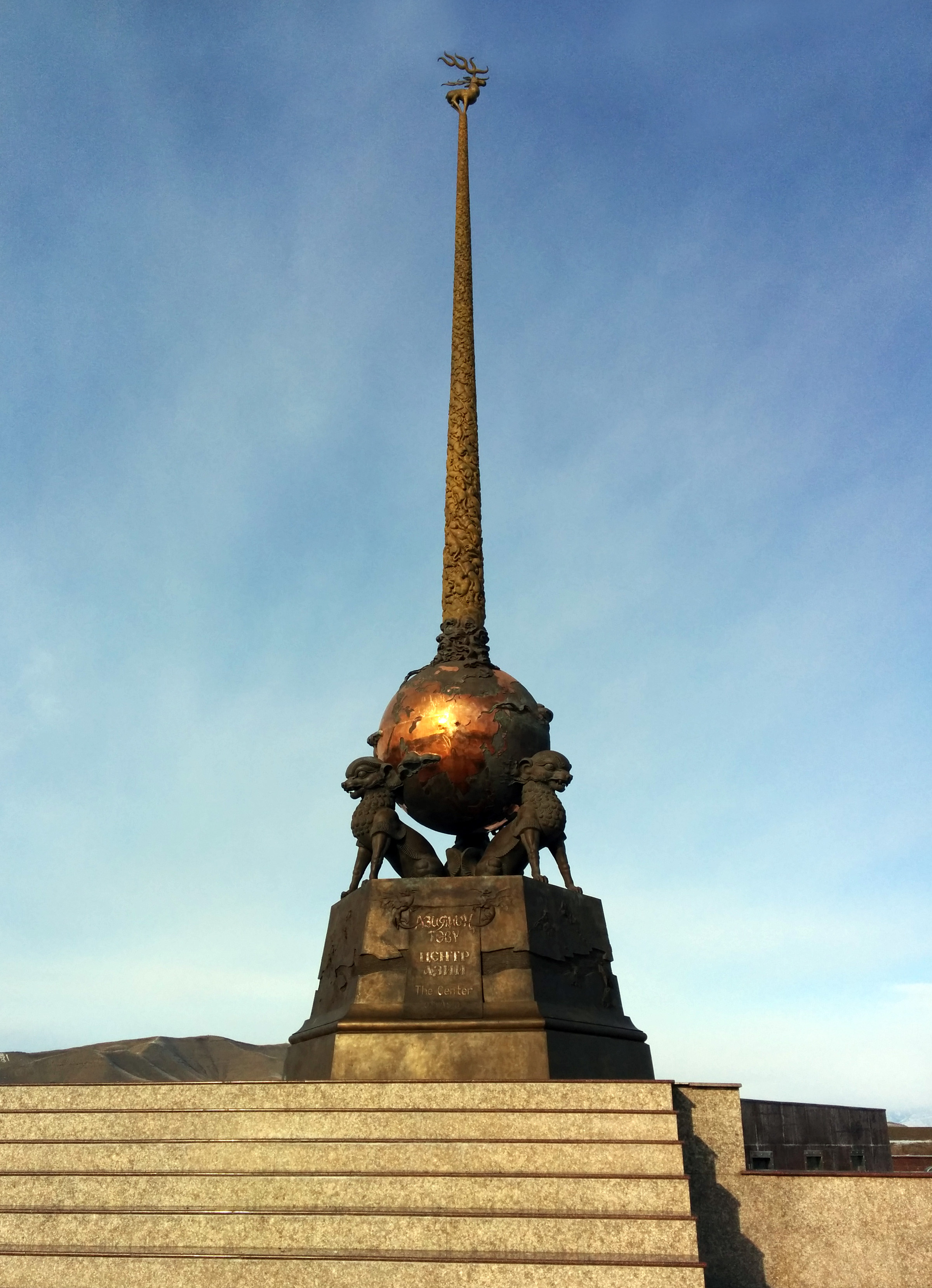
Renowned obelisk "The Center of Asia" (2014)

Kyzyl claims to be located exactly in the geographical center of Asia. This claim is disputed. (Note: Ürümqi in China makes a similar claim.) Nevertheless, locals constructed a monument labelled "Center of Asia" in Tuvan, Russian, and English. Tos-Bulak is an area of open fields and mineral springs which lies immediately south of Kyzyl.

Kyzyl stands at the point where the Great Yenisey (Bii-Xem) meets the Little Yenisey (Kaa-Xem) river to form the Yenisey proper (Ulug-Xem). Most development takes place south of the Yenisey and Little Yenisey and follows the curve of the river, with the highest development centered just below the confluence of the Great Yenisey with the Little Yenisey. A monument was built in 1964 on the riverbank to mark this point.

=== Climate ===
Kyzyl

Climate chart (precipitation, max. and min. temperature)
J	F	M	A	M	J	J	A	S	O	N	D
9 −24 −33	5 −16 −29	4 −2 −15	8 14 −1	13 21 5	33 27 12	56 28 15	48 25 12	27 18 4	8 9 −4	12 −7 −16	13 −20 −28
- █ Average max. and min. temperatures in °C
- █ Precipitation totals in mm
- Source: Pogoda.ru.net
Imperial conversion
J	F	M	A	M	J	J	A	S	O	N	D
0.4 −11 −27	0.2 3 −20	0.2 28 4	0.3 57 30	0.5 69 41	1.3 80 53	2.2 83 58	1.9 78 53	1.1 65 40	0.3 47 25	0.5 20 3	0.5 −4 −19
- █ Average max. and min. temperatures in °F
- █ Precipitation totals in inches

The climate of Kyzyl is a cold semi-arid type (Köppen climate classification BSk, Trewartha climate classification BSbd), bordering on a humid continental climate (Köppen Dwb, Trewartha Dcbd), with average highs around 25 °C (77 °F) in the summer and −20 °C (−4 °F) in the winter and only 218 mm (8.58 in) of precipitation annually. Located far from any moderating bodies of water and at a relatively high latitude, temperatures can be extreme, though less so than in the Sakha Republic. Nevertheless, the temperature has never risen above freezing between 22 November and 19 February. On the 20th of February, 2021, the temperature rose to above freezing for the first time in recorded history. Temperature swings can be rapid. The transitional seasons of spring and autumn are short. Only October averages close to the annual mean of −0.7 °C (30.7 °F).

Kyzyl's climate is dry and sharply continental, and the relatively low altitude contributes to its extreme cold. In winter, the air in the basin stagnates and cools under the influence of the Siberian anticyclone, forming a powerful temperature inversion. Winter (November to March) is exceptionally harsh for the city's latitude (Kyzyl is located at the same latitude as London, Kursk or Orenburg), snow-free (0.1–0.2 m or 3.9–7.9 in), and windless. The average temperature in January is −28.7 °C (−19.7 °F), and the absolute minimum is −54 °C (−65 °F), making Kyzyl among the 10 coldest cities in Russia and the world. Spring is short: daytime thaws that begin in March lead to a rapid decline of snow cover by the end of that month, although even in April, the temperature can drop at night to −27.3 °C (−17.1 °F) due to sudden arctic winds.

In May, hot weather quickly sets in, with occasional prolonged droughts. Summer in Kyzyl begins in mid-May and ends in mid-September. In summer, the city is characterized by high daytime temperatures. The maximum temperature is among the ten hottest cities in the Russian Federation at 40.7 °C (105.3 °F). Precipitation is most common in the summer. Dust storms are possible in May and July. In August, heavy rainfall and severe thunderstorms are not uncommon. In late September, the first frosts are observed, although the weather is still quite hot during the day. Trees lose their leaves in the beginning of October, and a rapid decrease in average temperatures begins. At the end of October, before the snow cover is established, the average daily temperature drops below 0 °C (32 °F), which makes it impossible to grow winter crops, and many fruits and berries. Snow cover is usually established in mid-November, followed by a sharp drop in temperatures to −20 °C (−4 °F) and below.

The center of the Asian maximum atmospheric pressure is located above Tuva in the cold season, and Kyzyl lies at the bottom of a deep basin surrounded by mountains. This dense atmosphere up to the level of planetary winds at heights of 2 to 2.5 km (1.2 to 1.6 mi) creates a powerful inversion over the city in winter. The temperature at an altitude of 2 km (1.2 mi) above the city can be 15 to 20 °C (27 to 36 °F) degrees higher than at the surface of the earth. Almost from the end of October to the beginning of March, there is windless, often clear weather, leading to strong smog gathering over the city and the basin. On some days, visibility can drop to 500–1,000 m (1,600–3,300 ft) due to this smog. Severe air pollution in winter is a substantial environmental concern. The government of the region is currently seeking to build gasification infrastructure to combat this.

The record high of 40.7 °C or 105.3 °F was recorded on 15 July 2004. The record low of −54.0 °C or −65.2 °F was recorded on 4 February 1945.

Climate data for Kyzyl (1991–2020, extremes 1943–present)
Month	Jan	Feb	Mar	Apr	May	Jun	Jul	Aug	Sep	Oct	Nov	Dec	Year
Record high °C (°F)	−5.8 (21.6)	1.6 (34.9)	19.6 (67.3)	31.6 (88.9)	35.6 (96.1)	39.1 (102.4)	40.7 (105.3)	39.9 (103.8)	33.2 (91.8)	24.5 (76.1)	13.0 (55.4)	−1.8 (28.8)	40.7 (105.3)
Mean daily maximum °C (°F)	−23.7 (−10.7)	−15.9 (3.4)	−2.0 (28.4)	13.6 (56.5)	20.8 (69.4)	26.9 (80.4)	28.4 (83.1)	25.4 (77.7)	18.3 (64.9)	8.5 (47.3)	−6.7 (19.9)	−20.2 (−4.4)	6.1 (43.0)
Daily mean °C (°F)	−28.7 (−19.7)	−23.1 (−9.6)	−9.2 (15.4)	5.7 (42.3)	12.7 (54.9)	19.0 (66.2)	21.1 (70.0)	17.9 (64.2)	10.6 (51.1)	1.4 (34.5)	−11.7 (10.9)	−24.4 (−11.9)	−0.7 (30.7)
Mean daily minimum °C (°F)	−32.9 (−27.2)	−28.9 (−20.0)	−15.4 (4.3)	−1.1 (30.0)	5.0 (41.0)	11.8 (53.2)	14.7 (58.5)	11.7 (53.1)	4.4 (39.9)	−4.1 (24.6)	−15.9 (3.4)	−28.3 (−18.9)	−6.6 (20.1)
Record low °C (°F)	−52.6 (−62.7)	−54.0 (−65.2)	−45.2 (−49.4)	−27.3 (−17.1)	−10.7 (12.7)	−1.8 (28.8)	2.8 (37.0)	−0.7 (30.7)	−10.1 (13.8)	−20.5 (−4.9)	−46.1 (−51.0)	−52.6 (−62.7)	−54.0 (−65.2)
Average precipitation mm (inches)	9 (0.4)	5 (0.2)	4 (0.2)	8 (0.3)	13 (0.5)	33 (1.3)	56 (2.2)	48 (1.9)	27 (1.1)	8 (0.3)	12 (0.5)	13 (0.5)	236 (9.3)
Average rainy days	0	0	1	7	12	14	17	16	12	6	1	0	86
Average snowy days	24	19	9	3	1	0	0	0	0.3	5	18	24	103
Average relative humidity (%)	77	77	73	48	42	50	57	62	62	66	80	79	64
Mean monthly sunshine hours	82	128	214	249	289	296	287	275	229	168	84	59	2,360
Source 1: Pogoda.ru.net
Source 2: climatebase.ru (sun, 1943-2012)

== Administrative and municipal status ==
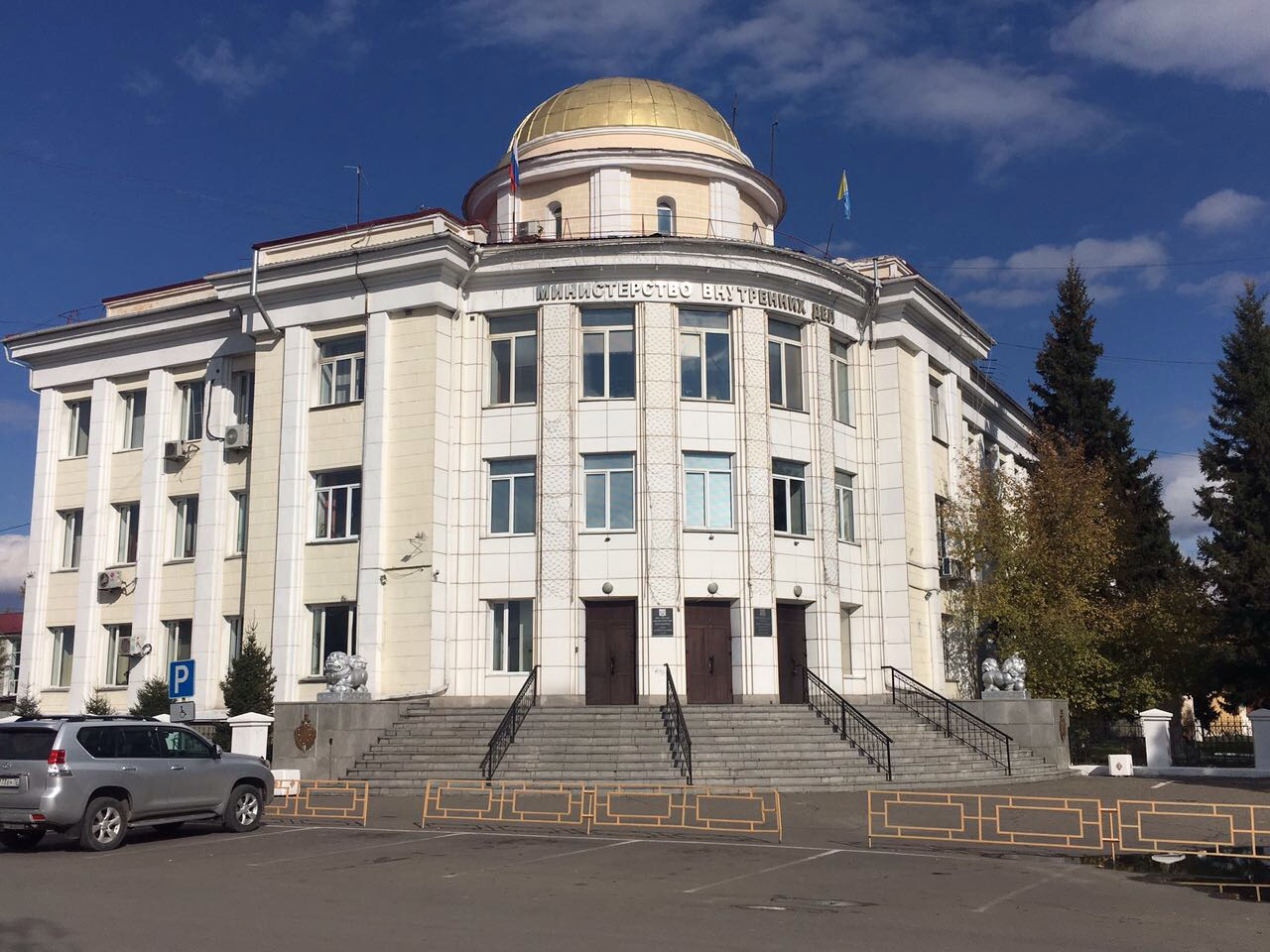
The building of the Ministry of Internal Affairs of the Republic of Tuva

Kyzyl is the capital of the republic of Tuva. Within the framework of administrative divisions, it is incorporated as a city under republic jurisdiction (urban okrug, an administrative unit with a status equal to that of the districts), as Kyzyl Urban Okrug.

== Demographics ==
According to the 2020 All-Russian Population Census, as of October 1, 2021, in terms of population, the city was in 136th place out of the 1117 cities in the Russian Federation.

National composition

According to the 2021 census, out of 125,241 residents of the city, Tuvans made up 81.3% (101,821 people), Russians made up 16.4% (20,540 people), and others made up 2.3%.

Historical population
Year	Pop.	±% p.a.
1939	10,000	—
1959	34,462	+6.38%
1970	51,683	+3.75%
1979	66,027	+2.76%
1989	84,641	+2.51%
2002	104,105	+1.60%
2010	109,918	+0.68%
2021	125,241	+1.19%
Source: Census Data

== Industry ==
Manufacturing plants include brickyards, sawmills, furniture manufacturing, and food-processing plants.

== Transportation ==
=== Road connection ===
The federal highway M54 "Yenisei" connects Kyzyl with Abakan and Mongolia via Erzin.

=== Air traffic ===
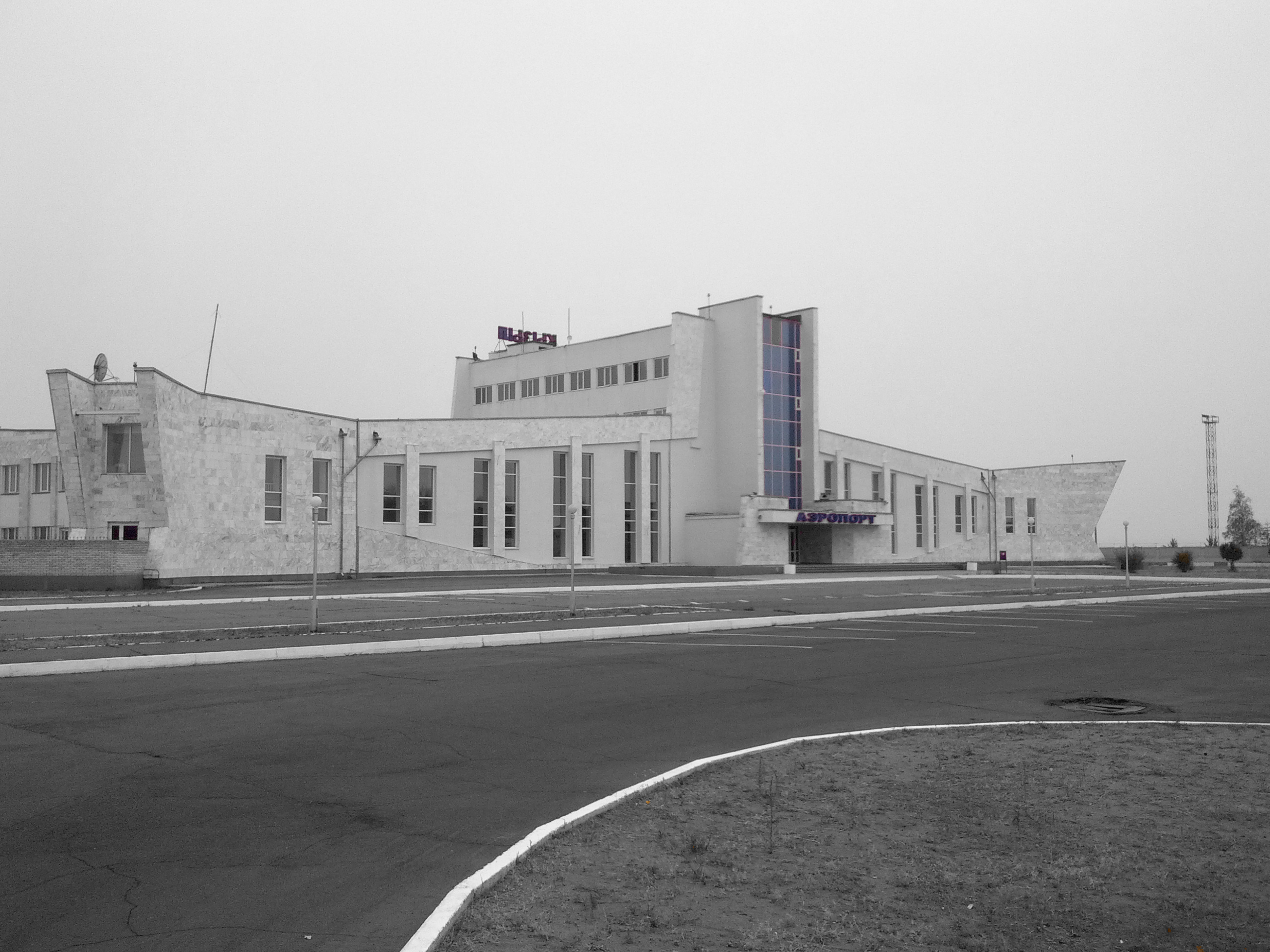
Kyzyl Airport

The city is served by the Kyzyl Airport. The airport provides regular flights to Moscow, Novosibirsk, Krasnoyarsk, Irkutsk, as well as to remote locales of Tuva. The airport is included in the list of reference airports in Russia.

=== The railway ===
There is a project of the Tuvan Railway with a railway terminal in Kyzyl. The Kuragino–Kyzyl railway line is still being designed. The construction of the route started in 2011, but only 1 kilometre or 0.6 miles of track was built near Kyzyl.

== Tourism ==
=== Sights ===
An obelisk, symbolizing the geographical midpoint of Asia, is located on the bank of the Yenisei River at the Center of Asia Sculpture Complex. Three versions have been built — in 1964, 1984 and 2014. The new obelisk was designed by the Buryat artist Dashi Namdakov. It is represented by an ensemble of three lions holding a globe topped with a spire. Externally, the monument is very similar to the previous obelisks. It depicts grandiose figures of eastern dragons and a high stele, surrounded by symbolic animals intertwined in a rush of ascent to the sky. The animal figures also represent the twelve creatures of the Buddhist horoscope.

The ethnic and cultural complex of Aldyn-Bulak occupies the coastal zone of the Yenisei, 45 km from Kyzyl. The installation was built as a model of the universe, where the roles of stars and planets are assigned to yurts of different sizes and purposes. Although the yurts are decorated as authentic as possible to the Uralic way of life, Aldyn-Bulak has all the amenities, including places for tourists to stay, a restaurant, a sauna, a parking lot.

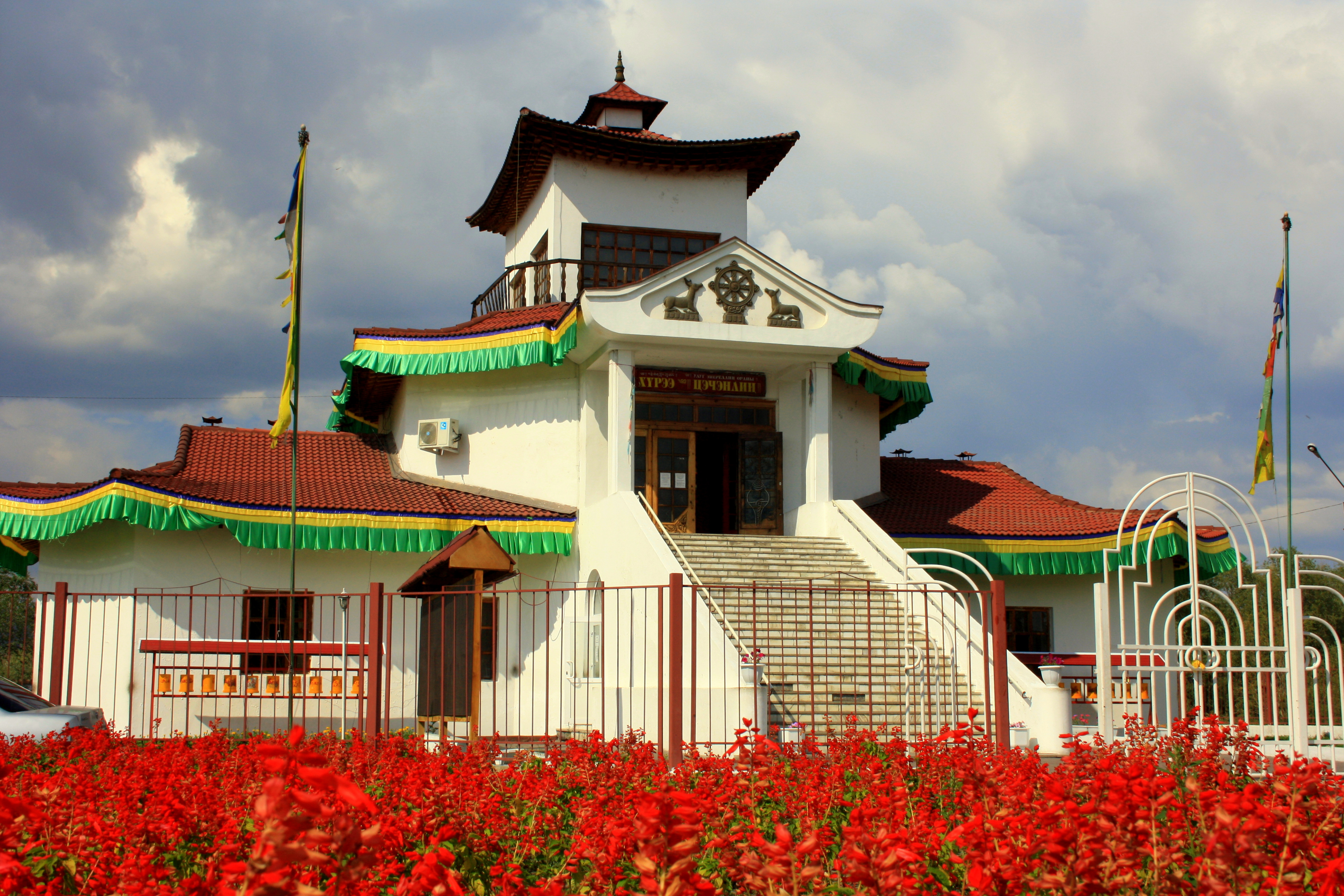
Tsechenling Temple

The Tsechenling Temple is one of the most important Buddhist attractions of Kyzyl. Built in 1998, it consists of two floors: the first – as a residence, the second – for prayer. The corners of the building appear worn, due to the tradition of walking around the temple in a circle and touching the corners. Classes on spiritual practices and languages are held inside. Admission is free.

The Buddhist Prayer Wheel was officially opened in 2006. It is considered the largest prayer wheel in Russia. It came from an Indian monastery, where the monks worked on the wheel for several years. Millions of scrolls with mantras are stacked inside.

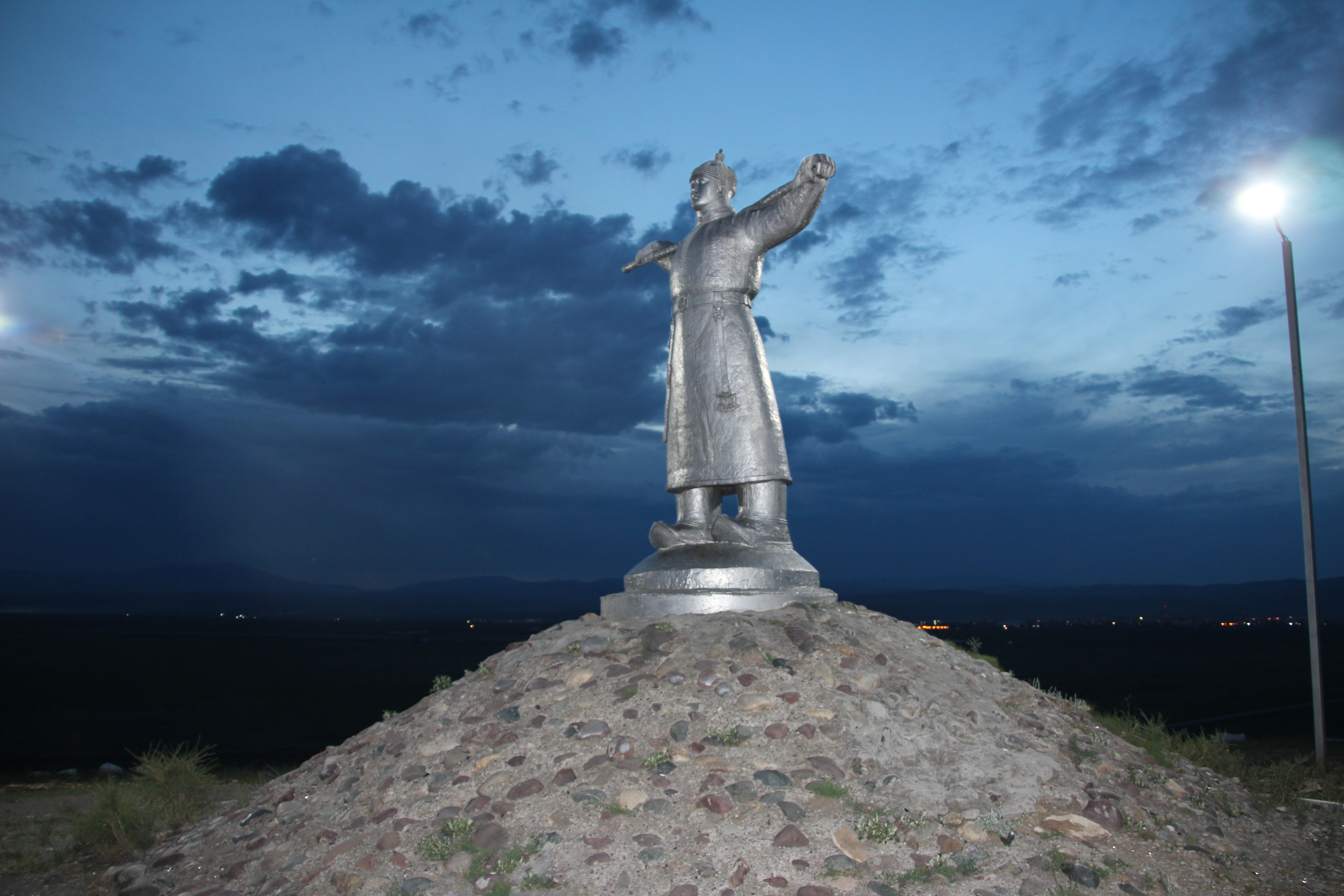
Kadarchy Monument

The Kadarchy Monument was installed in 1997 in front of the Kyzyl Airport. The monument is a shepherd with a staff in traditional Tuvan clothing. After the sculpture took its place on the hill, the locals considered that the hero did not have enough liverstock, so "sheep" were placed nearby in the form of boulders painted white.

The "Bobry" mineral spring is located 2 kilometres or 1.2 miles from Kyzyl. The name is translated to English as "beavers". According to legend, people learned about the spring from the beavers who went there to drink. There are more than 20 streams and springs, and the water is collected in small natural and handmade bowls or spreads. It is also said that, since each of the streams treats different diseases, tourists should try the water from all of them.

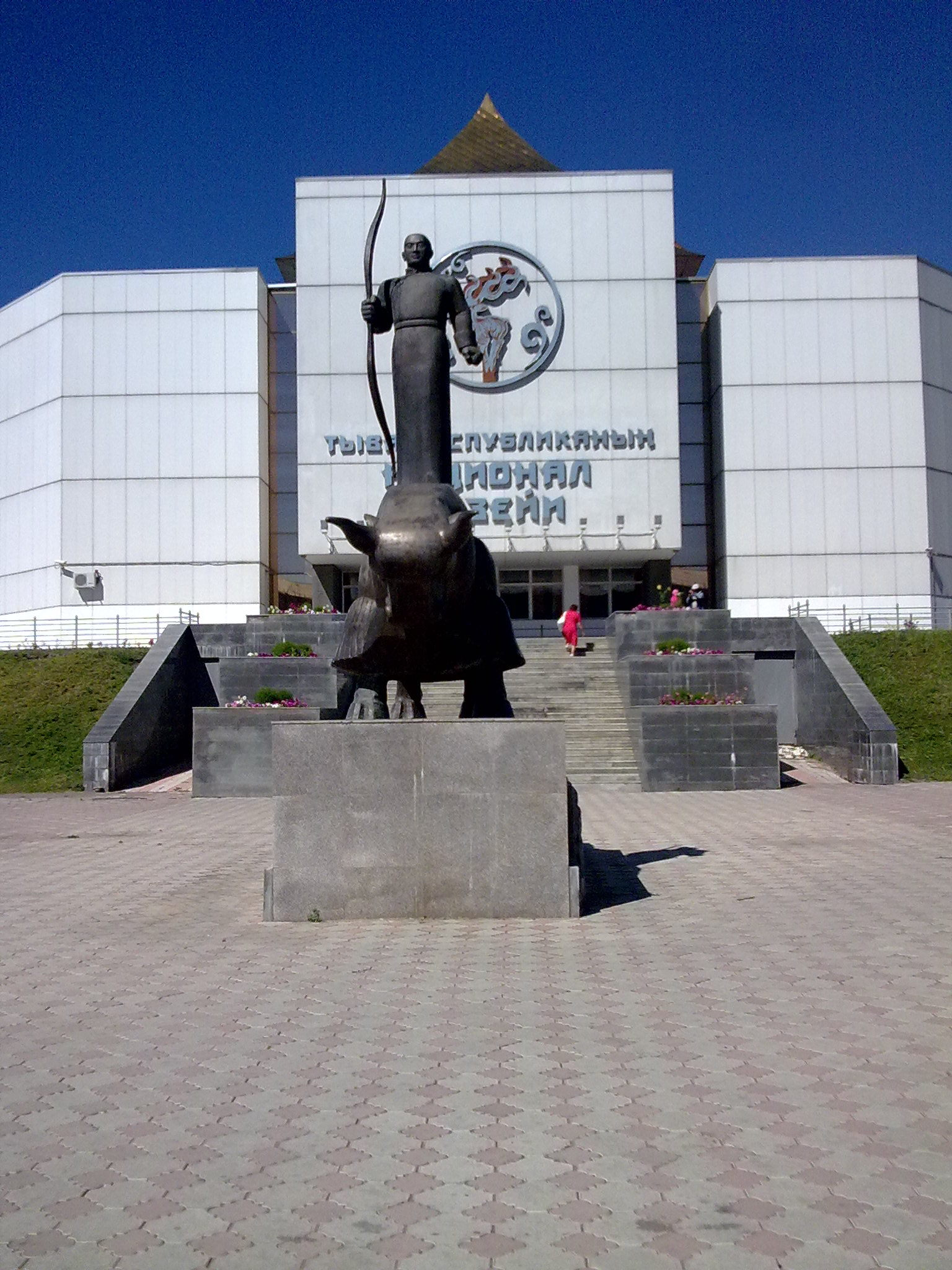
National Museum of the Republic of Tyva

The National Museum of the Republic of Tuva was founded in 1929 in Kyzyl. Unique collections presented in the museum include: Archaeological collections of the Scythian mounds "Arzhaan" and "Arzhaan-2"; Tuvan ethnographic collections; Tuvan women's and men's silver jewelry; and cult collections of Shamanism, Buddhism and Orthodoxy.

Dus-khol Lake is a salty spring in the Republic of Tuva. In the Tuvan dialect, the name of the reservoir means "salt lake". Dus-Khol is a natural monument and is under state protection. The water in this spring is said to possess healing properties. Throughout the summer, tourists and locals visit the reservoir.

=== Events ===
"Ustuu-Khuree", which is a showcase of indigenous cultures, has been held in the Republic of Tuva since 1999. The festival arose in line with the idea of restoring a ruined Buddhist temple in Chadan. The central tenets of the festival are live music and following the universal spiritual postulates of living faith (kindness, tolerance, unpretentiousness to the benefits of life). Participants stay in a tent city constructed near the temple, and are able to listen to numerous performers from various diverse traditions. Traditionally, the Ustuu-Khuree festival takes place in July.

The Khoomei (throat singing) festival program traditionally includes competitions among throat singing performers and the consecration ceremony "Ovaa khoomei". It is held every two years. During the festival, the number of participants has reached more than 600 people, including foreign citizens from different countries including the United States, People's Republic of China, Mongolia, Sweden, Germany, Japan, and Brazil.

Naadym is a Tuvan national holiday of shepherds, held annually in mid-August. It necessarily includes the traditional wrestling khuresh, horse racing, archery, competitions for the best traditional yurt, the best traditional costume, and the best equipment of a horse.

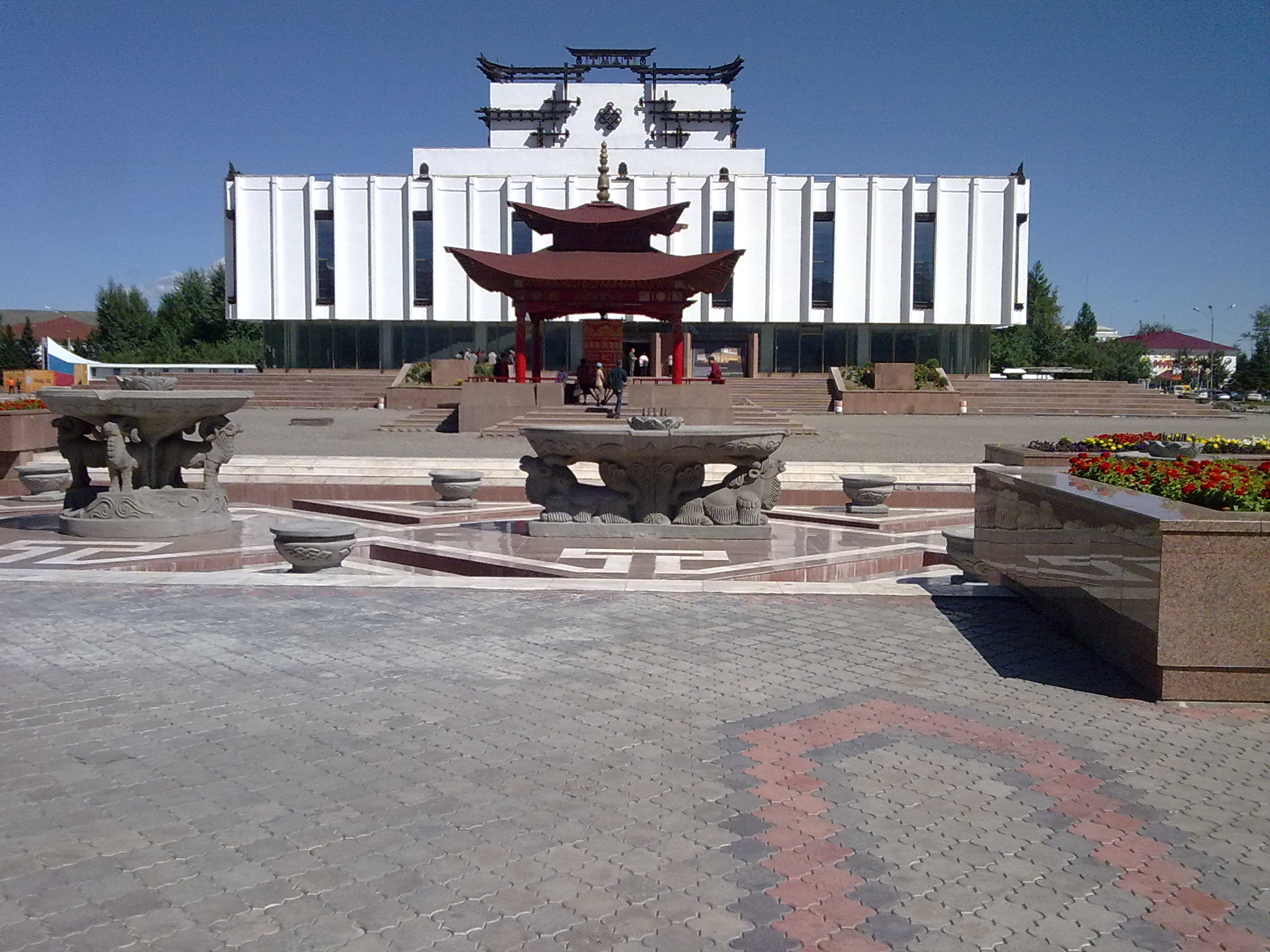
Kyzyl Theatre and prayer wheel

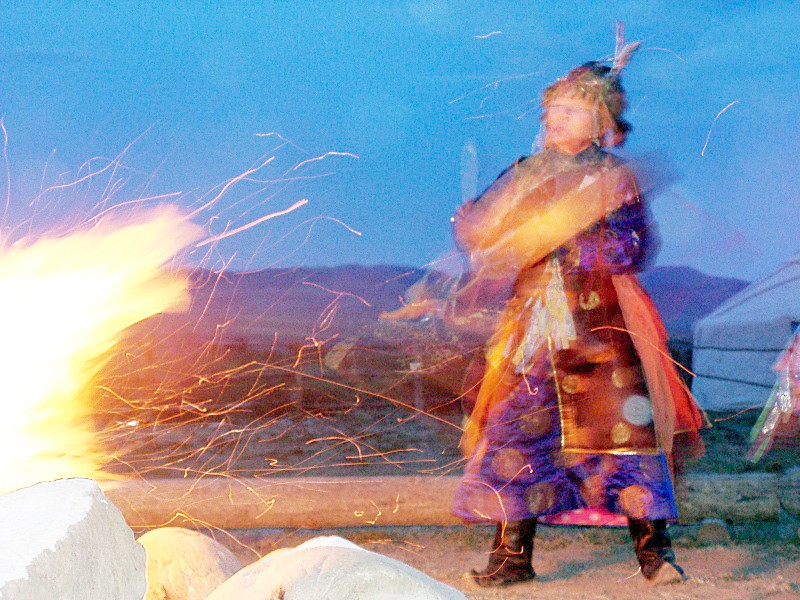
Shaman dancing near Kyzyl

== Education ==
- School No. 1 (Kyzyl) – the first school in the city.
- Tyvan State University – the only university in Tuva.

== In popular culture ==
In the late 1980s, Kyzyl was visited by Ralph Leighton, who had made it a quest to reach Tuva with his friend, the Nobel Prize-winning physicist Richard Feynman. Though Feynman died before they reached Tuva, the journey is chronicled in the book Tuva or Bust!

The film Genghis Blues chronicles the pilgrimage of a blind blues performer, Paul Pena, who learned Tuvan throat singing by listening to his shortwave radio, to compete in the Tuvan throat singing competition.

== Sister cities ==
- Honolulu, Hawaii, United States
- Cuiabá, Mato Grosso, Brazil (both cities are claimed to be located in the exact center of their respective continents)
- Erenhot, China
- Yakutsk, Russia
