= Kuragino–Kyzyl railway line =

Railway line in Russia

Coordinates: 53.7972°N 92.8643°E

Railway line Kuragino - Kyzyl Железнодорожная линия Курагино - Кызыл
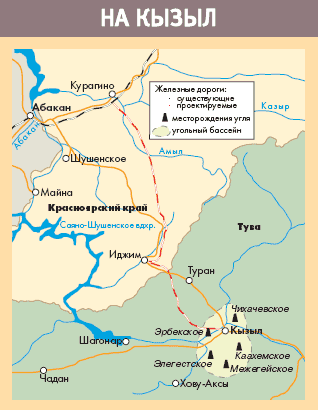
- "To Kyzyl!" (red)

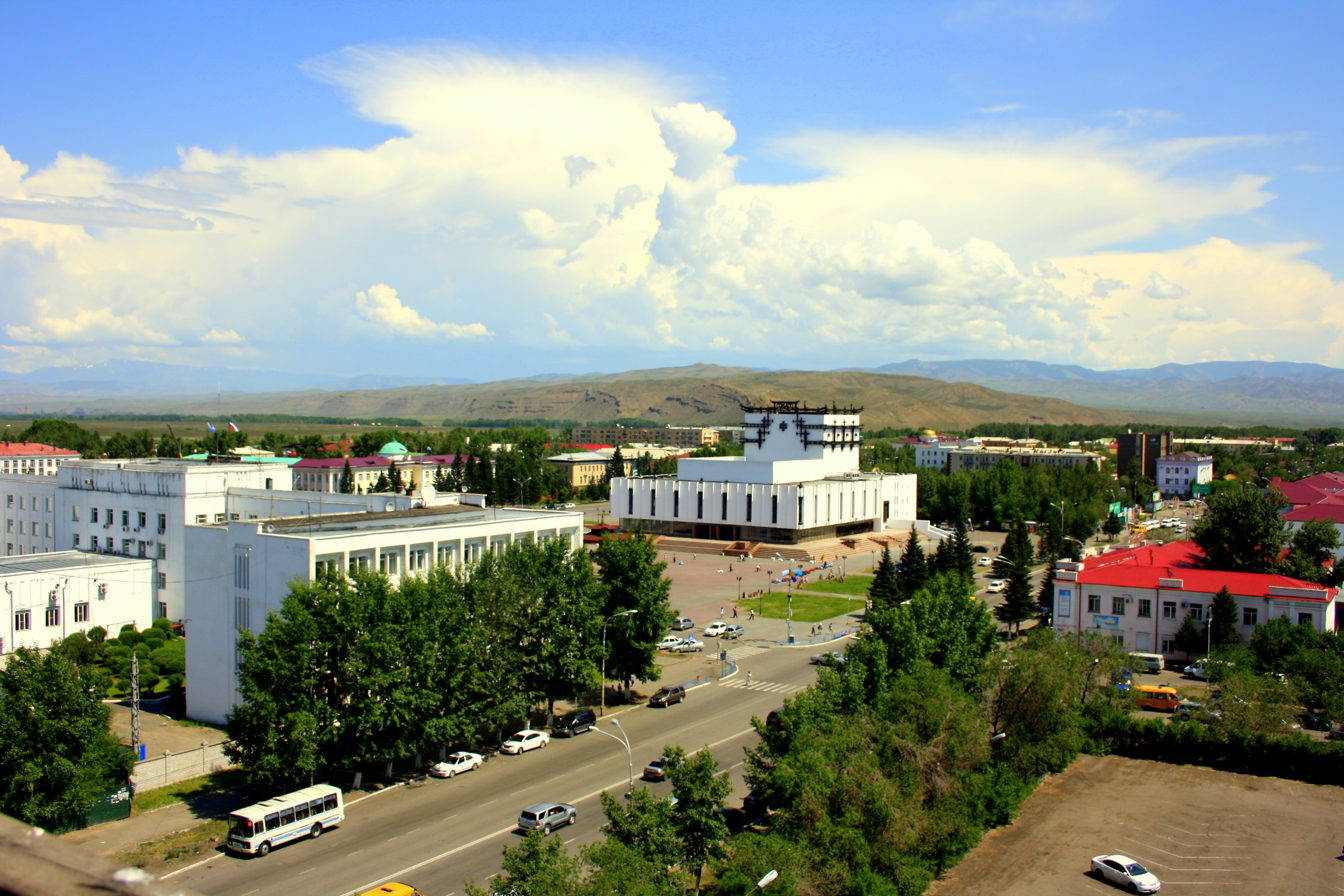
- Kyzyl, capital of Tuva.

Overview
- Headquarters: Kyzyl
- Locale: Russia
- Dates of operation: 2036 estimated–

Technical
- Track gauge: 1,520 mm (4 ft 11 27/32 in)

The Kuragino-Kyzyl railway line (Russian: Железнодорожная линия Курагино - Кызыл) is an unfinished railway construction project in Tuva, Russia. The railway was estimated to be 411.7 kilometres (255.8 miles) long and will link Tuva with Krasnoyarsk Krai and railway network of Russia.

It was expected that the railway will increase the capacity of the transport networks of Russia and also solve the problem of deposits management of Tuva. The proposed construction in Tuva is also expected to generate 10 thousand new jobs.

== History ==
Construction was planned to begin in 2009, but due to the financial and economic crisis in Russia the major sources of financing have been deferred to 2012: in 2010 from the investment Fund was planned to allocate more than 4 billion Rubles, in 2011 — 8.3 billion rubles, in 2012 — 29.7 billion Rubles. As a result, in 2010, as expected, should have been allocated about 100 billion Rubles.

Construction began in 2011 with celebration in presence of Putin, but it was halted after the completion of just 1 km due to a lack of funds. In June 2017, Russian Railways and Tuva Energy Industry Corporation signed a cooperation agreement to complete the railway by 2022. Under the plan, construction would be awarded by a subsidiary of TEIC, with half the cost being financed by the Russian Federation Investment Fund. In August 2018, TASS reported that construction was supposed to resume during the Autumn of the same year. The new reported target date for completion is in 2036 pending required funds.

== Route ==
According to the project, the total length of the trunk road will be 411.7 km, of which 288 km will pass through the territory of Krasnoyarsk Krai, to 123.7 km — on the territory of the Republic of Tuva. The railway will pass in the near settlements Bugental, Katulka, Podgorny, Upper and Lower Kuzhebar in Krasnoyarsk Krai, and also Arjaan and Eerbeek in Tuva. Permission was granted for the construction of the railway through the territory of the Natural Park Ergaki in order to reduce the overall length by 50 km. The project will use the experience of the laying of railroads through the territory of protected natural areas in Canada. The total route has been agreed with all stakeholders and will not damage the existing graves.

The road is designed as a single-track non-electrified with seven stations, 12 trips, 830 artificial structures, including 180 bridges with a total length of 21.248 kilometers, and seven tunnels with a total length of 4751.9 meters. "The longest tunnel will be Uyuk tunnel crossing Uyuk ridge on the territory of the Republic of Tuva. It will be laid at a maximum depth of 200 m, the length of the tunnel is 2.080 m", — said the Agency interlocutor.
