= Geographical midpoint of Asia =

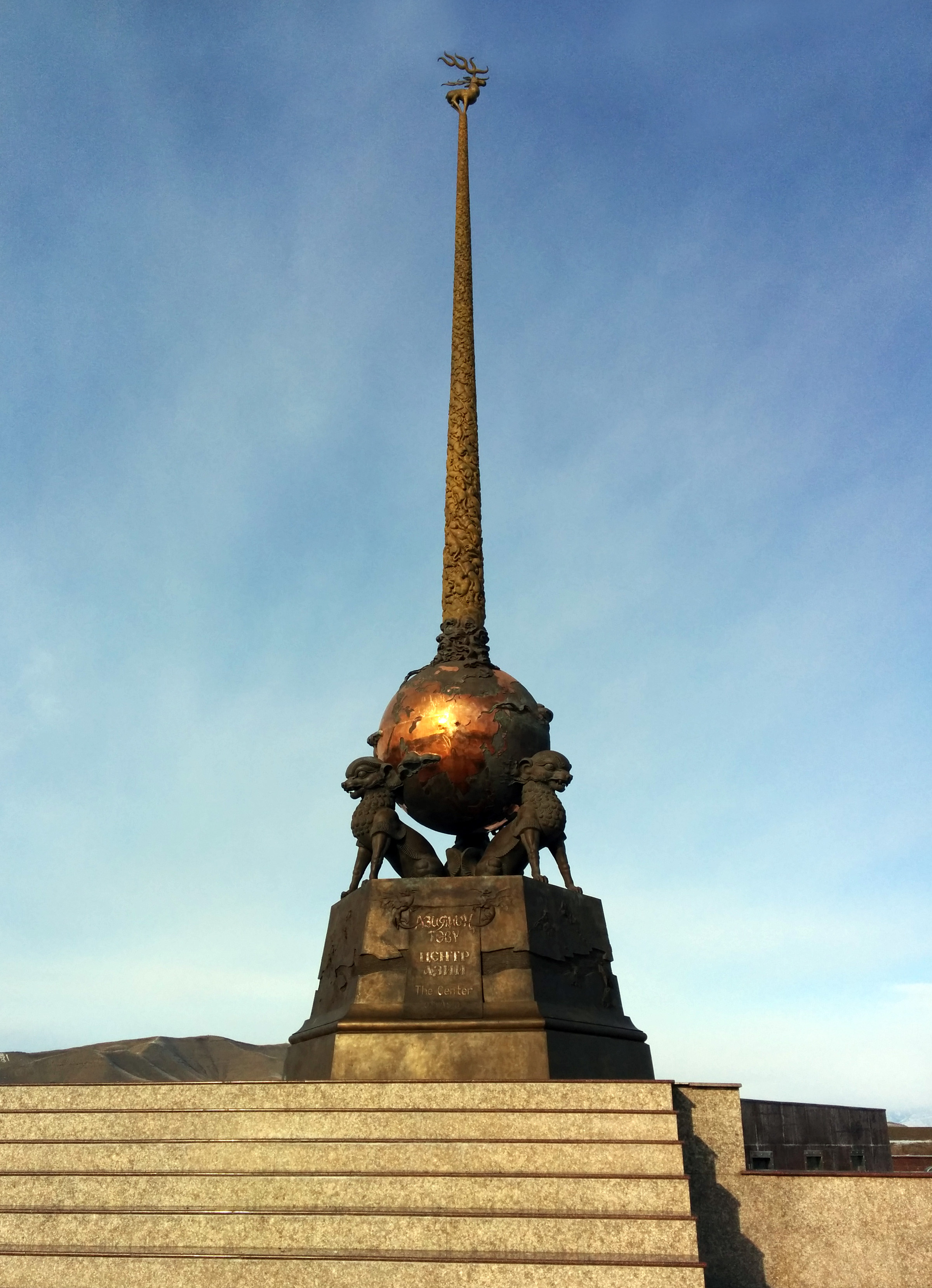
Obelisk of the Geographical Center of Asia, Kyzyl, Tuva, Russia

The location of the geographical centre of Asia (Russian: Центр Азии; Tuvan: Азияның Төвү; Chinese: 亚洲地理中心) depends on the definition of the borders of Asia, and on the method of calculating the final result.

It also depends on the projection used (radial projection on the plane vs. projection on a geoid), so there is no objectively correct way of finding "the centre of Asia". Thus, several places claim to host this hypothetical centre.

The first official declaration of the Centre of Asia was made in the 1890s by a British traveller, and calculated to be near the manor house of estate of Safyanov in Saldam (modern Tuva, Russia) at 52°29′00″N 96°05′09″E. There is a monument commemorating that fact in the estate garden.

== Current measurements ==
This map shows in red points some of the locations of claimants to the title of Centre of Asia.

=== China ===
The Geographical Centre of the Asian Continent (Chinese: 亚洲大陆地理中心) is the name of a monument indicating the supposed geographical centre of the Asian continent. It is located about 20 km (12 mi) south-west of Ürümqi, Xinjiang, People's Republic of China.

The measurement on which it is based dates to 1992. It was based on calculating the geographical centre of 49 Asian countries, including island states such as Cyprus and Japan (and, reflecting the People's Republic of China's political perspective, counting Palestine and Sikkim as separate countries), placing the geographical centre of all these countries at 43°40′52″N 87°19′52″E.

Before the completion of the monument, the site was marked by a wooden pole stating "Geographic Centre of Asia" (亚洲地理中心). The village Baojia Caozi (Chinese: 包家槽子村) that happened to be located at the site where the monument was to be built was relocated, and the new village is now known as the "Heart of Asia" (亚心).

The site has a tower labelled "Centre of Asia" which represents 48 countries of Asia. The monument was completed in the late 1990s.

=== Russia ===
Obelisk "Center of Asia" (Russian: Центр Азии; Tuvan: Азияның Төвү) is the name of a monument indicating the supposed geographical centre of the Asian continent. It is located in Kyzyl, Tyva Republic, Russian Federation.

It is located in the Tos-Bulak area south of the city, located about 700 km (430 mi) to the north-to-northeast of the Ürümqi monument at 51°43′29″N 94°26′37″E. The monument was completed in 1968.
