= School No. 1 (Kyzyl) =

Coordinates: 51°43′0.408″N 94°26′3.2964″E

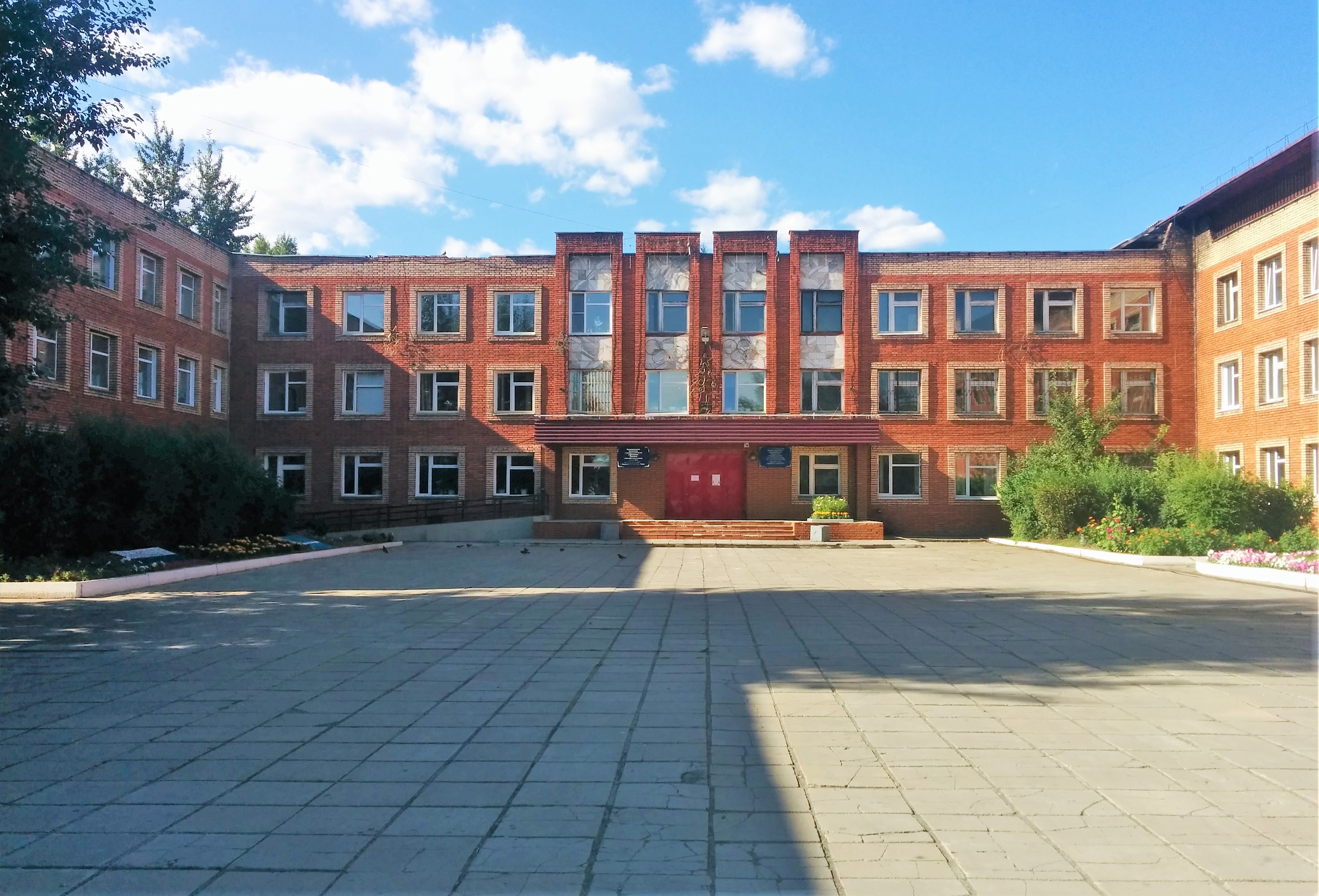
Main building of the school

Secondary school No. 1 (Russian: средняя общеобразовательная школа № 1 г. Кызыла) is the oldest school of Kyzyl city, Central District, Tyva Republic. The school is located at Kochetova st 59/3 in Kyzyl city, Tyva Republic, and has an associated elementary school building at no. p54 Schetinkino-Kravchenko.

== History ==
The school was established in 1916. May 10, 1961 with decision of the Executive Committee of Kyzyl City Council of People's Deputies, due to the 45th anniversary of the school, the school was named in honor of Hero of the Soviet Union Mikhail Artemyevich Bukhtuev, who studied in the school.

=== 100th anniversary ===
October 28, 2016 the school celebrated its 100th anniversary.

== Symbols ==
In October 2016, in the school was established a memorial-table honored to internationalist fighter Andrei Belevsky

== Awards ==
- The Diploma of the Russian national award "Elite of Russian education" in the nomination "Best Innovative Project".
