= Saldam =

Saldam Салдам
- Selo

Other transcription(s)
  - Tuvan: Салдам
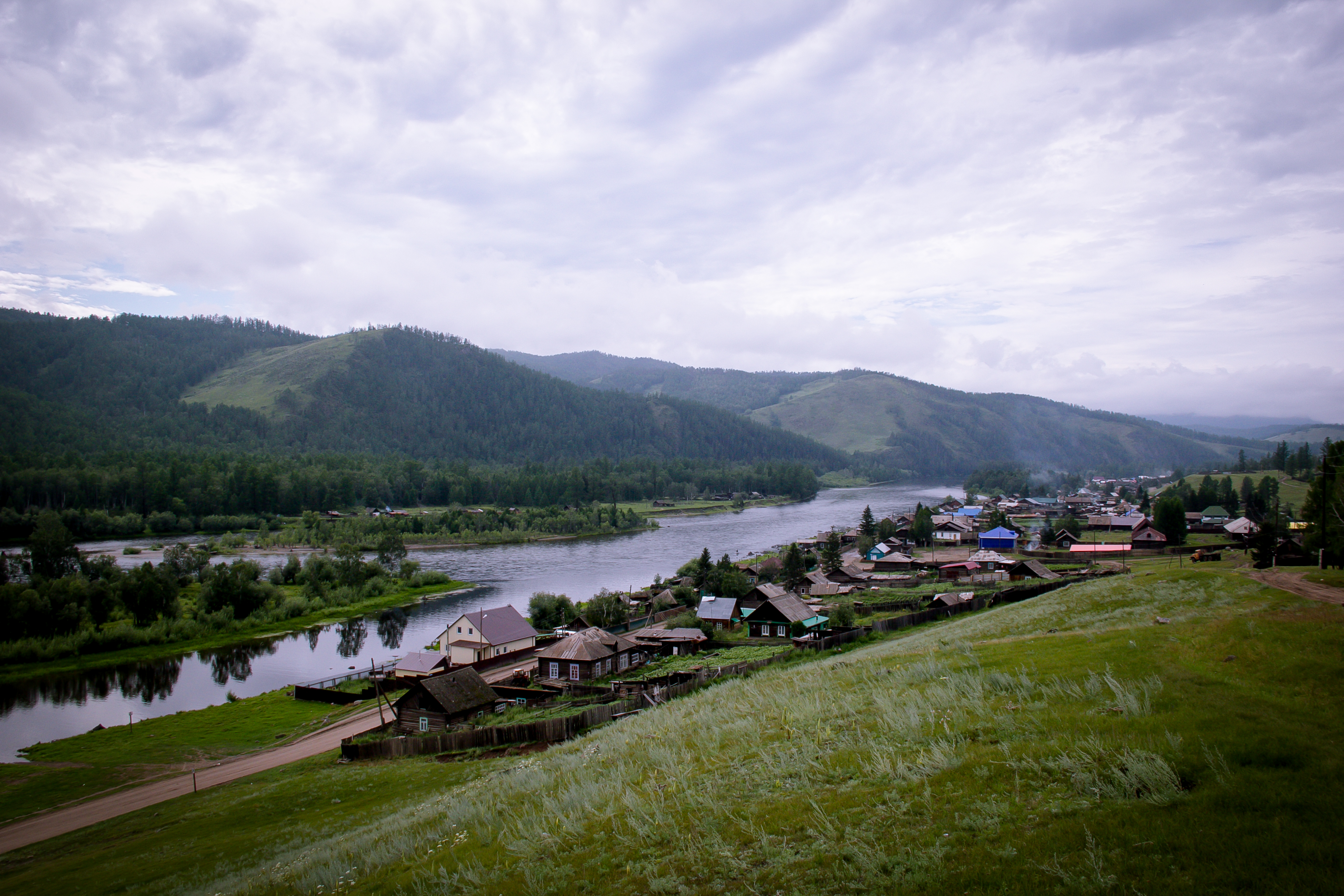
- Interactive map of Saldam
- Location of Saldam Saldam (Tuva Republic)
- Coordinates: 52°28′49″N 96°05′34″E
- Country: Russia
- Federal subject: Tuva
- Administrative district: Todzhinsky District
- SumonSelsoviet: Toora-Khemsky

Population (2010 Census)
  - Total: 545
  - Estimate (2021): 576 (+5.7%)

Municipal status
  - Municipal district: Todzhinsky Municipal District
  - Rural settlement: Toora-Khemsky Sumon Rural Settlement
- Time zone: UTC+7 (MSK+4)
- Postal code: 668530
- OKTMO ID: 93650444106

Saldam (Russian: Салдам; Tuvan: Салдам) is a rural locality (a selo) located in the Todzhinsky District of Tuva, Russia. Population: 545 (2010 census); 525 (2002 census); It is one of the places that claims to be the geographical midpoint of Asia.
