= Chum (tent) =

Type of temporary dwelling

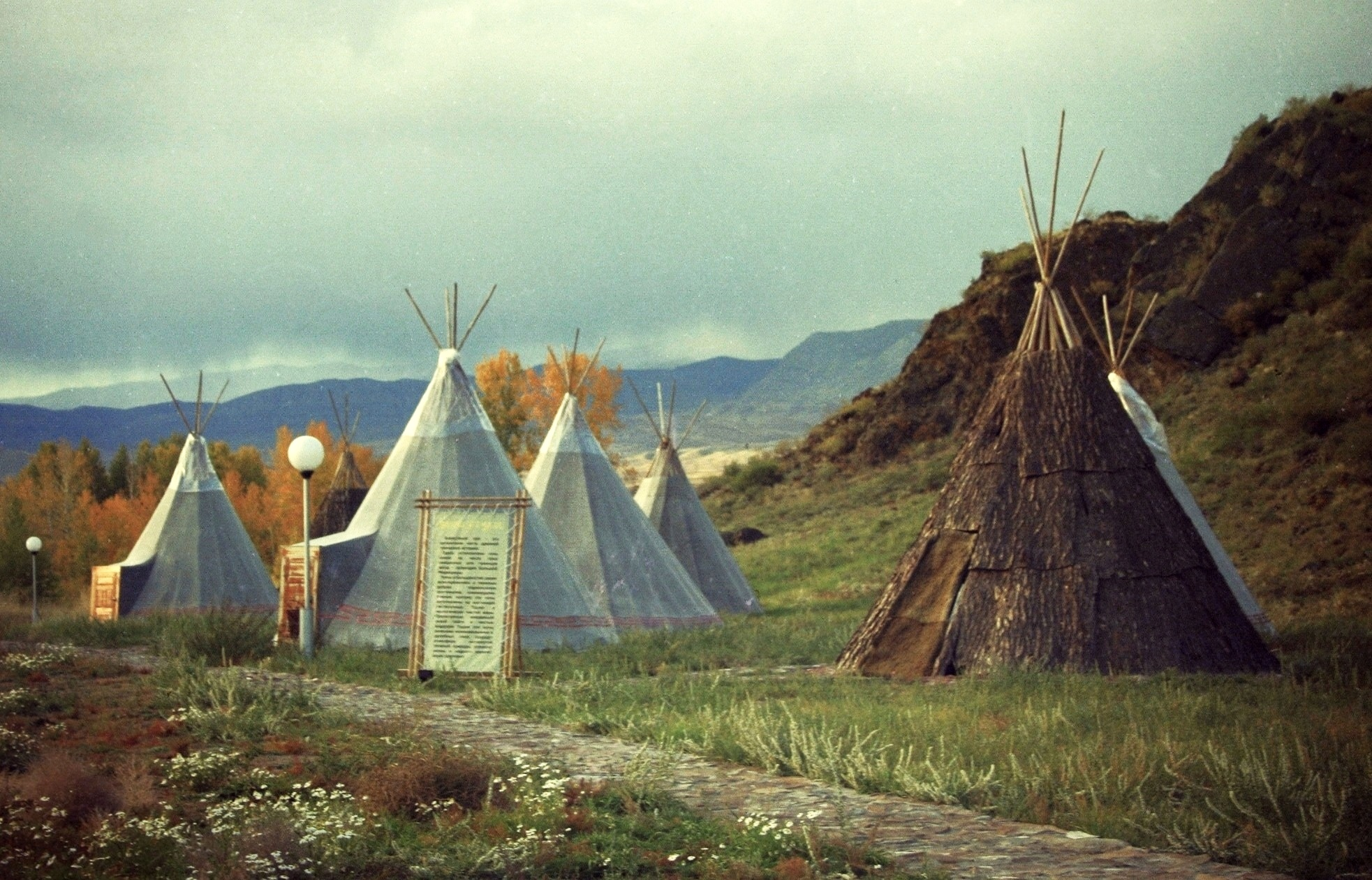
Tyvan chums in ethnocultural complex of Aldyn-Bulak, Russia, Tyva

A chum (/tʃuːm/) is a temporary dwelling used by the nomadic Uralic (Nenets, Nganasans, Enets, Khanty, Mansi, Komi, Selkups) reindeer herders of northwestern Siberia, Russia. The Evenks, Tungusic peoples living in Russia, Mongolia and China also use chums, as do the Yeniseian-speaking Ket people. They are also used by the southernmost reindeer herders, of the Todzha region of the Republic of Tyva and their cross-border relatives in northern Mongolia.

== Design ==
It has a design similar to a Native American tipi but some versions are less vertical. It is very closely related to the Sami lavvu in construction, but is somewhat larger in size. Some chums can be up to thirty feet (ten meters) in diameter.

The frame of a traditional chum is made of wooden poles that are organized in a circular cone. The cover around the frame may be of reindeer hides sewn together, as well as bark or felt. Modern chums may use modern materials. In the middle there is a fireplace used for heating and to keep mosquitoes away. The smoke escapes through a hole at the top of the chum. The frame and cover are usually quite heavy, but could be carried by the reindeer. The chum is still in use today as a year-round shelter for the Yamal-Nenets, Khanty and Todzha Tyvan people of Russia.

The word chum (Russian: чум) came from Komi-Zyrian: ćom [t͡ɕom] or Udmurt: ćum [t͡ɕum], both mean "tent, shelter". In different languages it has different names: Nenets: ḿāʔ [mʲaːʔ], Nganasan: maʔ, Khanty: (ńuki) χot. Evenki: ǯū [d͡ʒuː].

Tent-type dwellings of other Northern and Siberian indigenous peoples of Russia inclulde Yurt, Yaranga, and Lavvu.

== Gallery ==
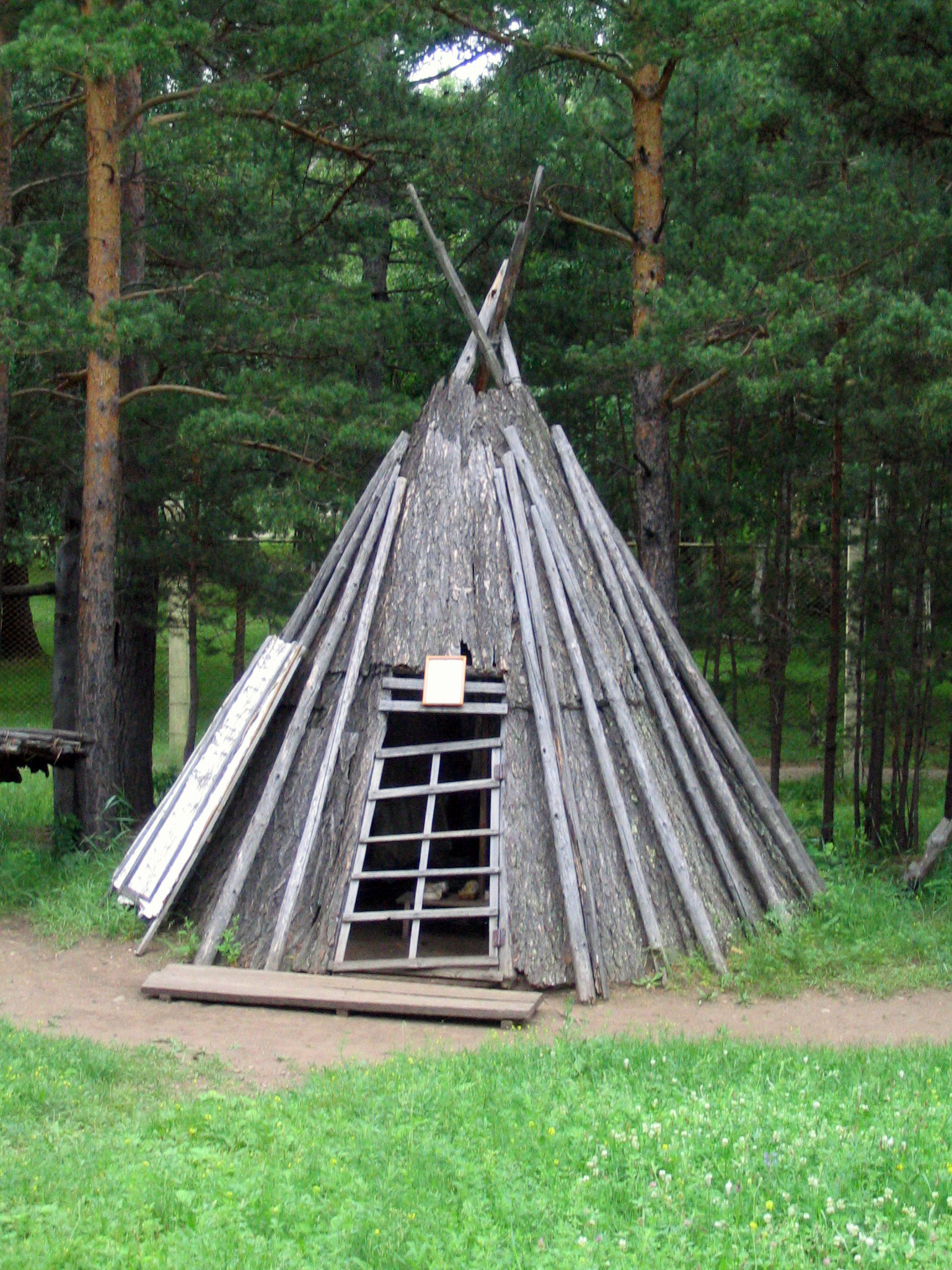
Evenk chum

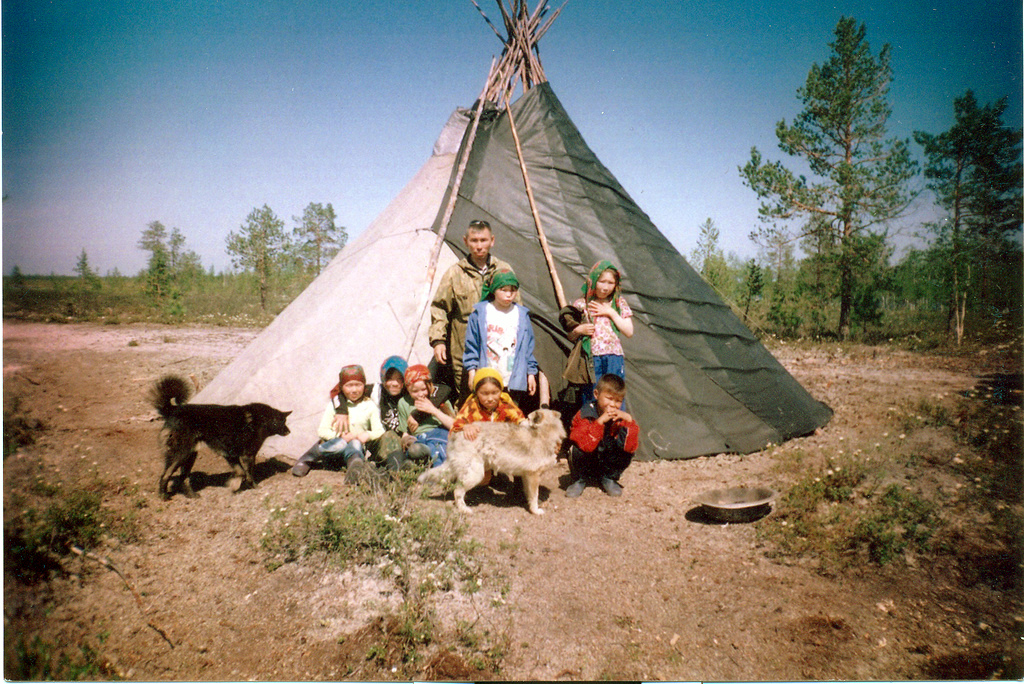
A modern Khanty chum

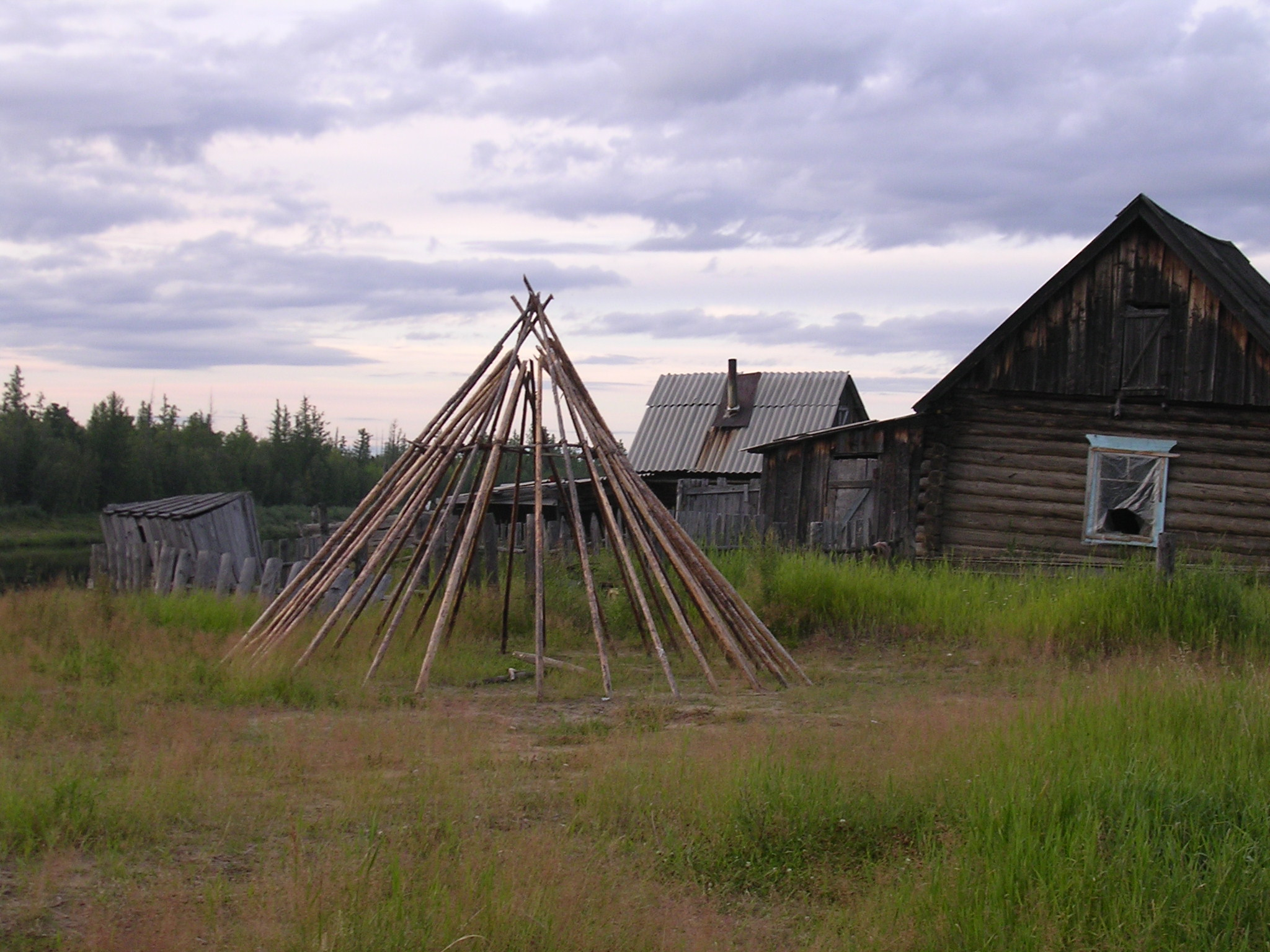
A chum frame in the village of Kellog
