= Tuvan State University =

School in Tuva, Russia

- Тувинский государственный университет Тываның күрүне университеди
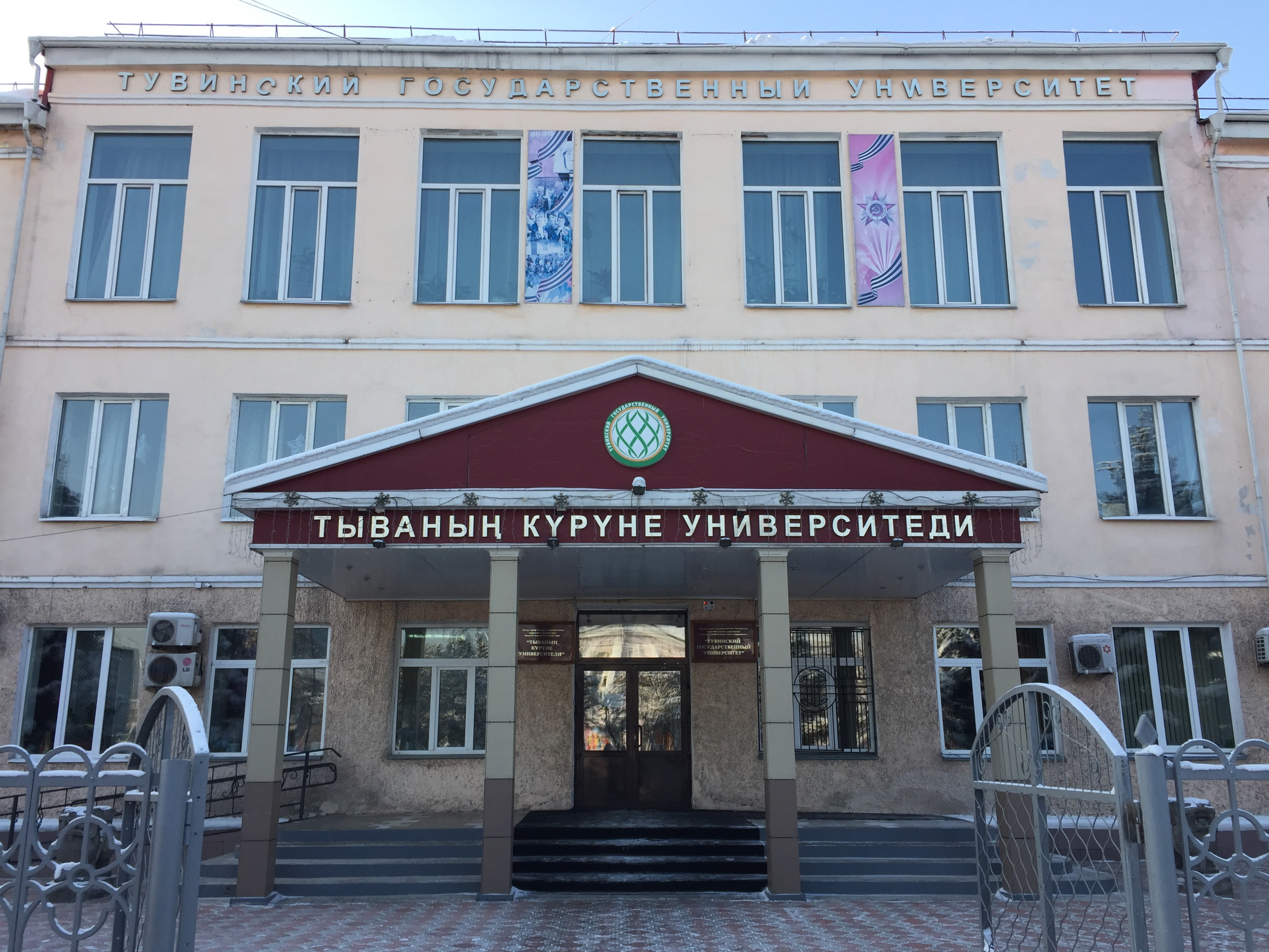
- Type: Public university
- Established: 1952
- Location: Kyzyl, Tuva, Russia; 51°43′18″N 94°27′02″E
- Campus: Urban
- Website: tuvsu.ru

The Tuvan State University (Note: Russian: Тувинский государственный университет; Tuvan: Тываның күрүне университеди, romanized: Tıvanıñ kürüne universitedi) is based in Kyzyl, the capital of Republic of Tuva, Russia, and is the only university in Tuva.

== History ==
The university was founded as the Kyzyl Teacher's College in 1952. The main building was constructed in 1953. The college later became Kyzyl State Pedagogical Institute and in 1956 offered two programs, philology and mathematics. In September 1995 the Russian government adopted a resolution establishing the Tuvan State University.

== Staff and students ==
Since its founding in 1952, the university has granted more than 10,000 degrees. In 2002 the university had over 300 staff and 3000 students. The university enrolls over 800 new students annually.

In 2007, Nikolay Dubrovsky, president of the university and a Deputy of the House of Representatives of the Great Khural of Tuva (the regional parliament of the republic) was charged with accepting a bribe of $1000 to admit two students to the Faculty of Law at the University.

== Affiliations ==
Within Tuva, the university has partnerships with the Tuvan Natural Resources Institute and the Tuvan Humanities Research Institute. Outside Tuva the university has a relationship with Ball State University in the United States and others.
