= Government Polytechnic Bhaga =

College in Jharkhand, India

- Motto: National Development through technical education
- Type: Government Polytechnic
- Established: 1905; 121 years ago
- Affiliations: Department of Higher & Technical Education
- Principal: Ganesh Prasad
- Location: BIT Sindri Campus, PO Motinagar, Dhanbad, Jharkhand, 828120, India; 23.6642°N 86.4651°E
- Campus: Urban]
- Language: English, Hindi
- Website: www.gpbhaga.com
- Location in Jharkhand Government Polytechnic Bhaga (India)

Government Polytechnic Bhaga, campus in BIT, is a college of mining engineering, computer engineering and food technology in Motinagar, Jharkhand. Established in 1905, Government Polytechnic Bhaga is considered the oldest college of mining engineering in Asia. The studies of mining started earlier in 1887, before formal establishment.

== See also ==
- Education in India
- Literacy in India
- List of institutions of higher education in Jharkhand
