= University of Tehran, Department of Mining Engineering =

The University of Tehran, Faculty of Engineering (Department of Mining Engineering)
- Madan-e Tehran (Persian forms for "Mining Depart. at University of Tehran ")
- Type: Public
- Established: 1934, Split 1998
- President: Omid Asqari, Ph.D.
- Academic staff: 20
- Undergraduates: 290
- Postgraduates: 135
- Location: Tehran, Tehran; Iran

The University of Tehran, Department of Mining Engineering was among the first four engineering departments established in the University of Tehran. The main responsibility of this department as the first formal education institution in mining engineering in Iran, was to train experts and professionals who could help exploiting the substantial potential of the country in natural resources, mineral deposits, and mining prospects. Within last 72 years, many mining engineers have received education and training in this school in various levels. Currently, the School of Mining Engineering has about 290 undergraduate and 135 graduate students.

Undergraduate students should pass 140 credit hours including 3 credit hours of senior project, 20 credit hours of humanities, basic engineering math, physics, and chemistry, applied geology courses, and mining related topics with several credit hours of field training.

School of Mining Engineering currently has 20 full-time and several prominent adjunct faculty members. It has several research laboratories and educational workshops including Mineral Processing, Rock Mechanics, Mineralogy, Petrology, Cartography, Geophysics, Geochemistry, XRD Lab, Analytical Lab, Industrial Mineral Application Lab, Mineral and Rock Museum, and a computer center.
