= Aldyn-Bulak =

Ethnocultural complex in Tuva, Russia

Coordinates: 51.554°N 93.887°E

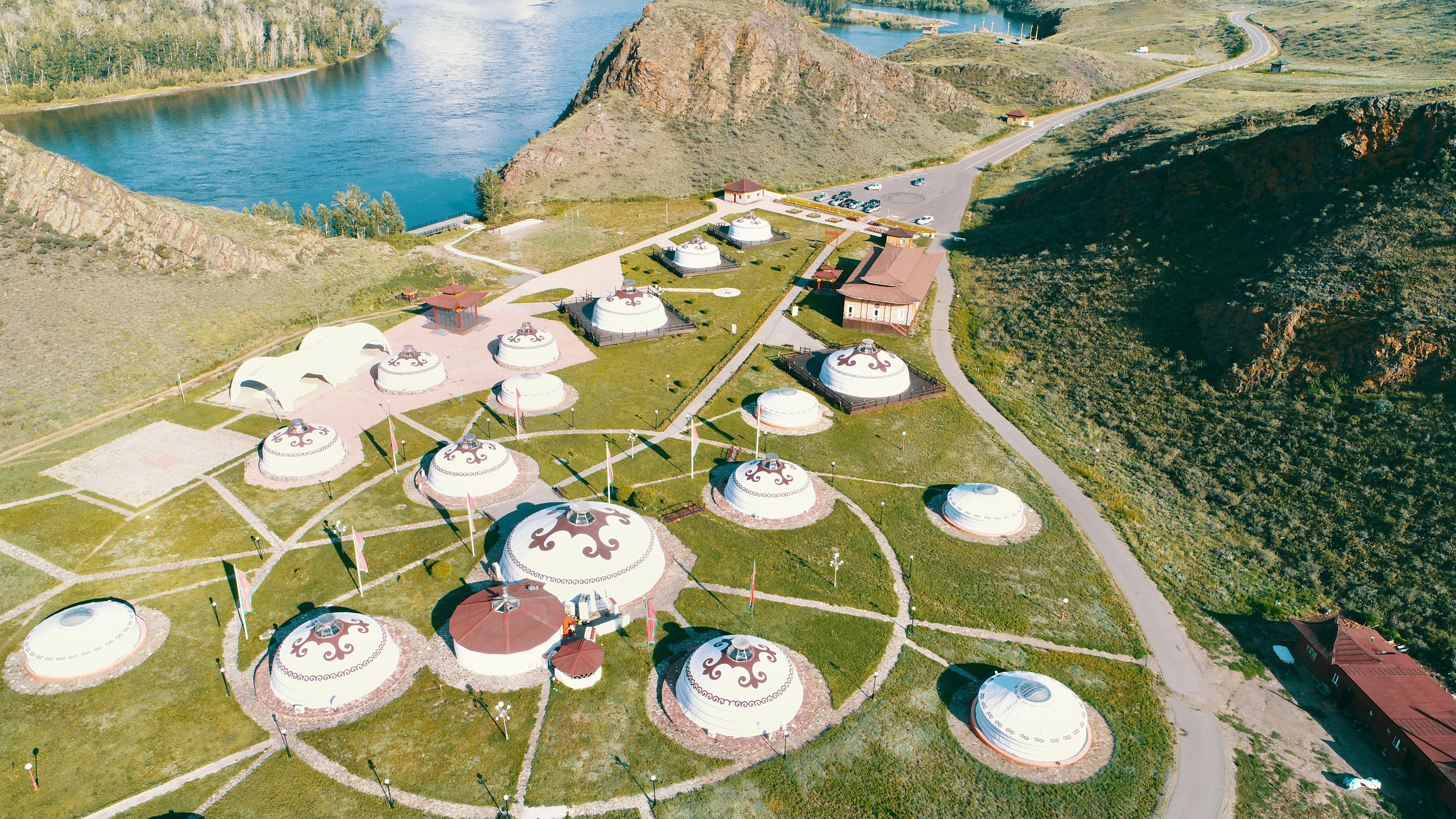
Aldyn-Bulak aerial view

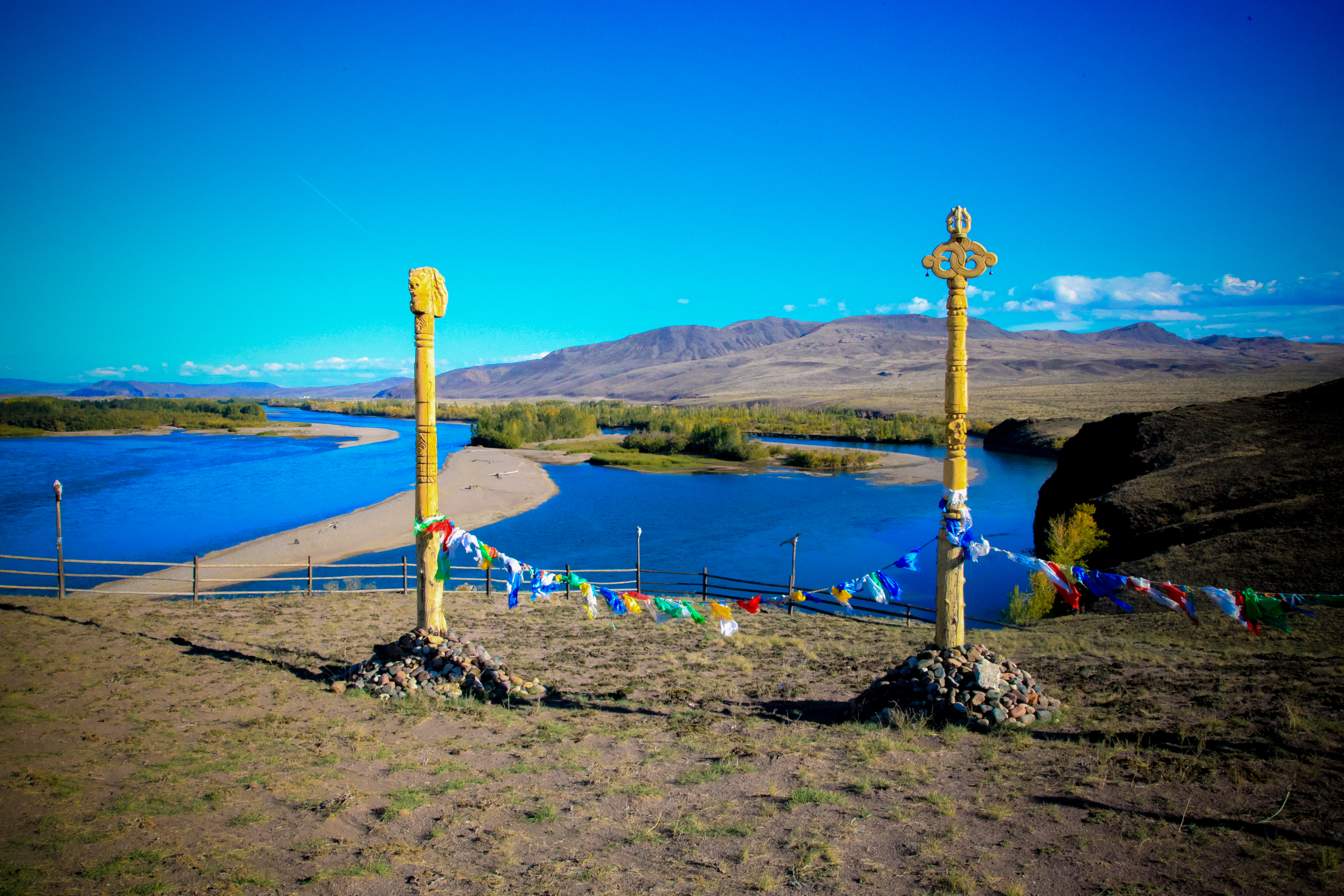
A view of Yenisey

Aldyn-Bulak (meaning "Golden Source" (of water) in Tuvan language) is an ethnocultural complex in Tandinsky District, Tuva Republic, Russia.

The complex is located by Ulug-Khem, the local name of the upper reaches of Yenisey River. The seven yurts in the central part of the layout symbolize the Sun System. The central yurt is a restaurant of national cuisine. The four larger yurts around the restaurant are known as the "president yurts". Further around are "economy class" yurts and Todha region-style chums for tourists, and other amenities. The guests, in addition to walking in the surrounding steppe and hills may learn traditional skills: horseback riding, bow shooting, milking a goat, making cheese, learn traditional Tuvan throat singing, as well as take part in ancient rituals. Aldyn-Bulak is a strictly non-smoking area, because all constructions are made of natural, easily flammable materials.
