= School of Engineering, University of South Wales =

School of University of South Wales

Coordinates: 51.589°N 3.326°W

- Type: Engineering School
- Established: 2013
- Parent institution: University of South Wales
- Location: Treforest, Wales
- Campus: Pontypridd Campus

The School of Engineering at the University of South Wales is one of university's largest schools, and is part of the university's Faculty of Computing, Engineering and Science. The school was originally part of the University of Glamorgan, before the university's formation in 2013.

It has divisions in aeronautical, mechanical, civil, electronic engineering and the built environment. The school hosts undergraduate courses from foundation years, to HND and HNC and bachelor's degrees (BSc and BEng). It also offers postgraduate taught (MSc and MEng) and research degrees, and doctoral level study.

In 2017, the university announced that it was establishing an aviation academy in Dubai South, in Dubai, United Arab Emirates, initially to provide aviation courses in the region.

== Research ==
The school hosts the Centre for Automotive & Power System Engineering (CAPSE), a nationally recognised independent research, development, test and certification house within the advanced automotive and power systems engineering sectors.

The school contributes to the Energy and Environment Research Instititue which comprises the following research centres:

- Sustainable Environment Research Centre
- Wireless and Optoelectronics Research and Innovation Centre
- Engineering Research Centre

== Dubai ==
The University of South Wales Dubai was announced in 2017, and opened to students in September 2018, offering undergraduate courses in aviation. The aviation academy was formally agreed by Sheikh Ahmed bin Saeed Al Maktoum, president of Dubai Civil Aviation Authority (DCAA) and chairman and chief executive of Emirates and the Pro Chancellor Professor John Andrews of the university.
