= List of libraries in New Zealand =

This list of libraries in New Zealand includes libraries operated by territorial authorities, universities, central government and the private sector, as well as public and community libraries.

New Zealand libraries
Library	Operator	Type	Location
Musical Electronics Library	Musical Electronics Library	Arts	Wellington and Auckland
Ngā Taonga Sound & Vision	Nga Taonga Sound & Vision	Arts	Wellington and Auckland
Boffa Miskell	Boffa Miskell	Business	Wellington
The Boston Consulting Group Library	Boston Consulting Group	Business	Auckland
Babbage Consultants Ltd Library	Babbage Consultants	Business	Auckland
Lion Breweries Technical Library	Lion	Business	Manukau
Ernst & Young New Zealand Knowledge Centre	Ernst & Young	Business	Auckland
Fisher & Paykel Appliances Library	Fisher & Paykel	Business	Auckland
Fisher & Paykel Healthcare Ltd Library	Fisher & Paykel Healthcare	Business	Auckland
Harrison Grierson Consultants Ltd Library	Harrison Grierson Consultants	Business	Auckland
International Accreditation New Zealand Library	International Accreditation New Zealand	Business	Auckland
KPMG Research & Information Services	KPMG	Business	Auckland
Sinclair Knight Merz Ltd (Akl) Library	Sinclair Knight Merz	Business	Auckland
McElroys Library	Mcelroys	Business	Auckland
Pattle Delamore Partners Ltd Library	Pattle Delamore Partners	Business	Auckland
DLA Piper New Zealand Library	DLA Piper	Business	Auckland
PWC Information and Research Services	PricewaterhouseCoopers	Business	Auckland
ASB Information Centre	ASB Information Centre	Business	Auckland
Tonkin & Taylor Ltd Library	Tonkin + Taylor	Business	Auckland
Fairfax Sunday Newspapers	INL Sundays Library	Business	Auckland
TVNZ News Reference Library	Television New Zealand	Business	Auckland
Walker Co Partnership Library	Walker Co Partnership	Business	Auckland
AECOM New Zealand Limited Library	Aecom	Business	Auckland
URS New Zealand Ltd Library	Aecom	Business	Auckland
Christchurch Press Information Services	The Press	Business	Christchurch
Tait Ltd Library and Information Services	Tait Communications	Business	Christchurch
Information Resource	Pipfruit New Zealand	Business	Hastings
WEL Networks Information Centre	WEL Networks	Business	Hamilton
Cawthron Institute Library	Cawthron Institute	Business	Nelson
Methanex NZ Ltd Technical Library	Methanex NZ	Business	New Plymouth
Shell Todd Oil Services Ltd	Shell Todd Oil Services	Business	New Plymouth
Transfield Worley Services Library	Transfield Worley Services Library	Business	New Plymouth
UnitedNetworks Library	UnitedNetworks	Business	Auckland
Carter Holt Harvey Forests Library	Carter Holt Harvey Forests	Business	Tokoroa
Library and Information Services	New Zealand Institute of Chartered Accountants	Business	Wellington
The Dominion Post Library	The Dominion Post	Business	Wellington
Deloitte Information Service	Deloitte	Business	Wellington
Energy Library	Energy Library	Business	Wellington
Meteorological Service of New Zealand (MetService) Library	Meteorological Service of New Zealand (MetService)	Business	Wellington
Telecom New Zealand Ltd., Information Resources	Spark New Zealand	Business	Wellington
Information Centre	Opus International Consultants	Business	Wellington
	Pasifika Education Centre	Education	Auckland
New Zealand Tertiary College Library	New Zealand Tertiary College	Education	Christchurch and Auckland
Te Kura The Correspondence School Library	The Correspondence School	Education	Wellington
Te Riu Roa Library	New Zealand Educational Institute (NZEI)	Education	Wellington
Learning Media Library	Learning Media	Education	Wellington
Wellington PPTA Library	Post Primary Teachers' Association	Education	Wellington
Defence Technology Agency Library	Defence Technology Agency	Government	Auckland
Human Rights Commission Library	Human Rights Commission	Government	Auckland
New Zealand Defence Force	New Zealand Defence Force	Government	Burnham
Waihi Beach Community Library	Western BOP District Council	Government	Katikati
Waihi Beach Community Library	Western BOP District Council	Government	Waihi Beach
Civil Aviation Authority Information Services	Civil Aviation Authority	Government	Petone
Civil Aviation Authority Information Services	Civil Aviation Authority	Government	Lower Hutt
New Zealand Defence Force, Army Training Group Library	New Zealand Defence Force	Government	Waiouru
MAF Information Services	Ministry of Agriculture & Forestry	Government	Wellington
Archives New Zealand	National Archives of New Zealand	Government	Wellington
Office of the Auditor-General Library	Office of the Auditor-General	Government	Wellington
Information Centre	Department of Building and Housing	Government	Wellington
Court of Appeal Library	Department for Courts	Government	Wellington
Statistics New Zealand Library	Statistics New Zealand	Government	Wellington
Crown Forestry Rental Trust Library	Crown Forestry Rental Trust	Government	Wellington
Knowledge Services	Department of Conservation	Government	Wellington
Commerce Commission Library	Commerce Commission	Government	Wellington
Information Centre	Department of Corrections	Government	Wellington
Crown Law Office, Research and Library Services	Crown Law Office	Government	Wellington
Judicial Libraries	Ministry of Justice	Government	Wellington
Library	Ministry for Culture and Heritage	Government	Wellington
Defence Library	New Zealand Defence Force	Government	Wellington
New Zealand Security Intelligence Library	New Zealand Security Intelligence	Government	Wellington
Ministry of Education Library	Ministry of Education	Government	Wellington
Information Centre	Education Review Office	Government	Wellington
Information Centre	Ministry for the Environment	Government	Wellington
Information Service	Ministry of Foreign Affairs & Trade	Government	Wellington
Library	Office of Film and Literature Classification	Government	Wellington
Parliamentary Library	Parliamentary Service	Government	Wellington
Ministry of Health Library	Ministry of Health	Government	Wellington
Information Management	Ministry of Economic Development	Government	Wellington
Department of Internal Affairs Information Centre	Department of Internal Affairs	Government	Wellington
National Assessments Bureau Information Centre		Government	Wellington
New Zealand Trade & Enterprise Library Services	New Zealand Trade & Enterprise	Government	Wellington
Ministry of Justice, Knowledge and Information Services	Ministry of Justice	Government	Wellington
Department of Labour, Knowledge Centre	Department of Labour	Government	Wellington
Law Commission Library	Law Commission	Government	Wellington
Inland Revenue Library & Information Services	Inland Revenue	Government	Wellington
Te Puni Kōkiri Library	Te Puni Kōkiri	Government	Wellington
Office of the Children's Commissioner Library	Children's Commissioner	Government	Wellington
Office of the Ombudsman Library	Office of the Ombudsman	Government	Wellington
Parliamentary Commissioner for the Environment Library	Parliamentary Commissioner for the Environment	Government	Wellington
Ministry of Pacific Island Affairs	Ministry of Pacific Island Affairs	Government	Wellington
Department of the Prime Minister and Cabinet, Corporate Services	Department of the Prime Minister and Cabinet	Government	Wellington
New Zealand Police Library	New Zealand Police	Government	Porirua
State Services Commission Knowledge Services Group	State Services Commission	Government	Wellington
Creative New Zealand, Information Centre	Arts Council of New Zealand	Government	Wellington
Reserve Bank of New Zealand Knowledge Centre	Reserve Bank of New Zealand	Government	Wellington
Te Taura Whiri i te Reo Mäori	Te Taura Whiri i te Reo Mäori	Government	Wellington
Environmental Protection Authority	Environmental Risk Management Authority	Government	Wellington
Ministry of Science + Innovation Library	Ministry of Research, Science and Technology	Government	Wellington
Ministry of Social Development Knowledge Services	Ministry of Social Development	Government	Wellington
Land Information New Zealand Library	Land Information New Zealand	Government	Wellington
New Zealand Teachers Council Library	Teaching Council	Government	Wellington
Tourism New Zealand Library	Tourism New Zealand	Government	Wellington
Ministry of Transport Library	Ministry of Transport	Government	Wellington
NZ Transport Agency Library	Land Transport New Zealand	Government	Wellington
The Treasury Information Management Team, Central Agencies Shared Services	The Treasury	Government	Wellington
Waitangi Tribunal Library	Waitangi Tribunal	Government	Wellington
Ministry of Women's Affairs Information Centre	Ministry of Women's Affairs	Government	Wellington
Supreme Court Library	Supreme Court of New Zealand	Government, Law	Wellington
New Zealand AIDS Foundation Library	NZ AIDS Foundation	Health	Auckland
New Zealand College of Chiropractic, NZCA Centennial Library	New Zealand College of Chiropractic	Health	Auckland
Ernest & Marion Davis Library Trust	Ernest & Marion Davis Library Trust	Health	Auckland
Mental Health Foundation of New Zealand, National Information Service and Resource Centre	Mental Health Foundation of New Zealand	Health	Auckland
National Audiology Centre Library	National Audiology Centre	Health	Auckland
Wairau Hospital Staff Library	Nelson-Marlborough Health System	Health	Blenheim
Allan Bean Centre Library	Allan Bean Centre	Health	Christchurch
Canterbury Medical Library	Canterbury Medical	Health	Christchurch
New Zealand Health Technology Assessment (NZHTA) Library	New Zealand Health Technology	Health	Christchurch
Tairawhiti District Health Library	Tairawhiti District Health	Health	Gisborne
West Coast District Health Board Library	West Coast District Health Board	Health	Greymouth
Hawkes Bay District Health Board Library	Healthcare Hawkes Bay	Health	Hastings
Waikato District Health Board Library	Health Waikato	Health	Hamilton
Southern District Health Board, Southland Hospital Library	Southland District Health Board	Health	Invercargill
Hutt Valley District Health Board Staff Library	Hutt Valley District Health Board	Health	Lower Hutt
Te Omanga Hospice Library	Te Omanga Hospice	Health	Lower Hutt
Wairarapa District Health Board Library	Wairarapa District Health Board	Health	Masterton
Nelson Hospital Staff Library	Nelson Marlborough Health Services	Health	Nelson
Taranaki District Health Board Library	Taranaki District Health Board	Health	New Plymouth
Waitemata District Health Board Library	Waitematā District Health Board	Health	Auckland
Counties Manukau DHB Library	Counties Manukau DHB	Health	Auckland
MidCentral Health, Centennial Clinical Library	MidCentral Health	Health	Palmerston North
Lakes District Health Board Library	Lakes District Health Board	Health	Rotorua
QE Health Library & Information Centre	QE Health	Health	Rotorua
Wolters Kluwer Pharma Solutions, Adis International Ltd, Knowledge and Information Management	Wolters Kluwer Health	Health	North Shore City
Bay of Plenty District Health Board, Tauranga Hospital Library	Bay of Plenty District Health Board	Health	Tauranga
South Canterbury District Health Board, Staff Library	Health South Canterbury	Health	Timaru
Alcohol Advisory Council of NZ, Information Services	Alcohol Advisory Council of New Zealand	Health	Wellington
Wanganui Hospital, Medical Library	Whanganui District Health Board	Health	Wanganui
CCS Disability Action Information Service	New Zealand CCS	Health	Wellington
Family Planning Library	Family Planning Association	Health	Wellington
Northland District Health Board Staff Library	Northland Health	Health	Whangārei
IHC New Zealand Inc. Library & Information Service	IHC New Zealand	Health	Wellington
Bay of Plenty District Health Board, Whakatane Hospital Library	Pacific Health	Health	Whakatane
Wellington Medical and Health Sciences Library	University of Otago Wellington	Health	Wellington
New Zealand Nurses' Organisation Library	New Zealand Nurses' Organisation	Health	Wellington
PHARMAC	Pharmac	Health	Wellington
Pharmaceutical Society of New Zealand Inc, Library & Information Centre	Pharmaceutical Society of New Zealand	Health	Wellington
Baldwins Intellectual Property (Akl) Library	Baldwin Shelston Waters	Law	Auckland
Buddle Findlay (Akl) Library	Buddle Findlay	Law	Auckland
Bell Gully (Akl) Information Service	Bell Gully	Law	Auckland
Chapman Tripp (Akl) Information and Research Centre	Chapman Tripp	Law	Auckland
Hesketh Henry Library	Hesketh Henry	Law	Auckland
New Zealand Law Society Library, Auckland	Auckland District Law Society	Law	Auckland
Russell McVeagh (Akl) Library	Russell McVeagh	Law	Auckland
Minter Ellison Rudd Watts Research & Information Service (Akl)	Minter Ellison Rudd Watts	Law	Auckland
Simpson Grierson Auckland Research Service	Simpson Grierson	Law	Auckland
Kensington Swan (Akl) Library	Kensington Swan	Law	Auckland
New Zealand Law Society Library, Christchurch	Canterbury District Law Society	Law	Christchurch
Baldwins Intellectual Property (Wn) Library	Baldwin Shelston Waters	Law	Wellington
Buddle Findlay (Wn) Library	Buddle Findlay	Law	Wellington
Bell Gully (Wn) Information Services	Bell Gully	Law	Wellington
Chen Palmer Library	Chen Palmer	Law	Wellington
Chapman Tripp (Wgtn) Information Centre	Chapmann Tripp	Law	Wellington
New Zealand Law Society Library, Wellington	Wellington District Law Society	Law	Wellington
DLA Phillips Fox (Wellington) Library	Phillips Fox	Law	Wellington
Russell McVeagh (Wn) Library	Russel McVeagh	Law	Wellington
Minter Ellison Rudd Watts (Wn) Research & Information Service	Minter Ellison Rudd Watts	Law	Wellington
Simpson Grierson Wellington Research Service	Simpson Grierson	Law	Wellington
Kensington Swan (Wn) Library	Kensington Swan	Law	Wellington
Watercare Services Ltd Library	Watercare Services	Local government	Auckland
Hamilton City Council, Research & Information Centre	Hamilton City Council	Local government	Hamilton
Waikato Regional Council Library	Environment Waikato	Local government	Hamilton East
Whangarei District Council, Information Services	Whangarei District Council	Local government	Whangārei
Bay of Plenty Regional Council Library	Bay of Plenty Regional Council	Local government	Whakatane
Greater Wellington Regional Council Library	Greater Wellington Regional Council	Local government	Wellington
Bill Laxon Maritime Library	Bill Laxon Maritime Library	Museum	Auckland
Auckland Museum Library	Auckland War Memorial Museum	Museum	Auckland
MOTAT, Walsh Memorial Library	Museum of Transport and Technology	Museum	Auckland
Canterbury Museum Documentary Research Centre	Canterbury Museum	Museum	Christchurch
Toitū Otago Settlers Museum Library	Toitū Otago Settlers Museum	Museum	Dunedin
Waikato Museum of Art and History Library	Waikato Museum of Art and History	Museum	Hamilton
Hawkes Bay Museum, Berry Historical Library	Hawkes Bay Cultural Trust	Museum	Napier
Nelson Provincial Museum Library	Nelson Provincial Museum	Museum	Nelson
National Army Museum NZ, Kippenberger Research Library	Army Museum Waiouru	Museum	Waiouru
Museum of New Zealand, Te Aka Matua Library	Museum of New Zealand	Museum	Wellington
Auckland Service Centre	National Library of New Zealand	National library	Auckland
Christchurch Centre	National Library of New Zealand	National library	Christchurch
Palmerston North Service Centre, School Services	National Library of New Zealand	National library	Palmerston North
Wellington	National Library of New Zealand	National library	Wellington
Wellington Service Centre	National Library of New Zealand	National library	Wellington
Alexander Turnbull Library	National Library of New Zealand	National library	New Zealand
Problem Gambling Foundation of New Zealand	Problem Gambling Foundation of New Zealand	Other	Auckland
New Zealand Childcare Association Library	New Zealand Childcare Association	Other	Wellington
Global Focus Aotearoa Library	Dev-Zone, The Development Resource Centre	Other	Wellington
New Zealand Fire Service, Information Centre	New Zealand Fire Service	Other	Wellington
Sir Alister McIntosh Memorial Library	Heritage New Zealand	Other	Wellington
Research New Zealand Library	Research New Zealand	Other	Wellington
Auckland Art Gallery Toi o Tamaki, E.H. McCormick Research Library	Auckland Art Gallery Toi o Tamaki	Other special libraries	Auckland
Consumer NZ Library	Consumers Institute	Other special libraries	Wellington
Environment & Conservation Organisations of NZ Inc. (ECO) Resource Centre	Environment & Conservation Organisations of NZ, Resource Centre	Other special libraries	Wellington
Business New Zealand Library	Business New Zealand	Other special libraries	Wellington
New Zealand Olympic Committee, Olympic Museum, Olympic Studies Centre	New Zealand Olympic Committee	Other special libraries	Wellington
Ayson Clifford Library, Carey Baptist College	Carey Baptist College	Polytechnic	Auckland
Unitec Institute of Technology	Unitec New Zealand	Polytechnic	Auckland
Library & Learning Services	Christchurch Polytechnic Institute of Technology	Polytechnic	Christchurch
Robertson Library	University of Otago College of Education and Otago Polytechnic	Polytechnic	Dunedin
Otago Polytechnic Cromwell Campus Library	Otago Polytechnic	Polytechnic	Cromwell
Otago Polytechnic Auckland International Campus Library	Otago Polytechnic	Polytechnic	Auckland
Tairawhiti Polytechnic Library	Tairawhiti Polytechnic	Polytechnic	Gisborne
Tai Poutini Polytechnic Library	Tai Poutini Polytechnic	Polytechnic	Greymouth
Waikato Institute of Technology Library	Waikato Institute of Technology	Polytechnic	Hamilton
Rotokauri Campus of WinTec Library	Waikato Institute of Technology	Polytechnic	Hamilton
Southern Institute of Technology Library	Southern Institute of Technology	Polytechnic	Invercargill
Manukau Institute of Technology Library	Manukau Institute of Technology	Polytechnic	Manukau
EIT Hawkes Bay, Twist Library	Eastern Institute of Technology	Polytechnic	Napier
Library Learning Centre	Nelson Marlborough Institute of Technology	Polytechnic	Nelson
Western Institute of Technology at Taranaki Library	Western Institute of Technology at Taranaki	Polytechnic	New Plymouth
Wellington Institute of Technology Learning Resource Centre	Wellington Institute of Technology	Polytechnic	Wellington
Whitireia Community Polytechnic Library	Whitireia Community Polytechnic	Polytechnic	Porirua
Universal College of Learning (UCOL) Library	Universal College of Learning	Polytechnic	Palmerston North
Te Wairere Library Learning Centre	Waiariki Institute of Technology	Polytechnic	Rotorua
Bay of Plenty Polytechnic Library	Bay of Plenty	Polytechnic	Tauranga
Aoraki Polytechnic Library	Aoraki Polytechnic	Polytechnic	Timaru
Whanganui UCOL Library	Universal College of Learning	Polytechnic	Wanganui
Open Polytechnic of New Zealand Library	Open Polytechnic of New Zealand	Polytechnic	Lower Hutt
NorthTec Library	Northtec	Polytechnic	Whangārei
David Yaxley Memorial Library, Lifeway College	Lifeway College	Prospect	Snells Beach
Fred Hollows Foundation NZ	Fred Hollows Foundation NZ	Prospect	Auckland
Injury Prevention Information Centre		Prospect	Auckland
Safekids Information and Resource Centre		Prospect	Auckland
The Donald Beasley Institute	The Donald Beasley Institute	Prospect	Dunedin
The Shepherd's Bible College	The Shepherd's Bible College	Prospect	Hastings
Waikato Times	Waikato Times	Prospect	Hamilton
Practical Education Institute (NZ) Ltd Library	Practical Education Institute	Prospect	New Plymouth
French Resource Centre Library	French Resource Centre	Prospect	Wellington
Luke, Cunningham & Clere	Luke, Cunningham & Clere	Prospect	Wellington
ONTRACK : NZ Railways Corporation	New Zealand Railways Corporation	Prospect	Wellington
James Duncan Reference Library	Sustainable Future Institute,	Prospect	Wellington
Ashburton Public Library	Ashburton District Council	Public library	Ashburton
Auckland Libraries	Auckland Libraries	Public library	Auckland
Cambridge Public Library	Waipa District Council	Public library	Cambridge
Carterton District Library	Carterton District Library	Public library	Carterton
Central Hawkes Bay District Libraries	Central Hawkes Bay District Council	Public library	Waipukurau
Central Otago District Libraries	Central Otago District Council	Public library	Alexandra
Central Otago District Libraries: Cromwell	Central Otago District Council	Public library	Cromwell
Christchurch City Libraries	Christchurch City Council	Public library	Christchurch
Clutha District Library	Clutha District Council	Public library	Balclutha
Dargaville Public Library	Dargaville Public Library	Public library	Dargaville
Dunedin Athenaeum Library	Dunedin Athenaeum and Mechanics' Institute	Other	Dunedin
Dunedin Public Libraries	Dunedin Public Libraries	Public library	Dunedin
Tower Room Library	Dunedin Chinese Garden	Other	Dunedin
Feilding Public Library	Manawatū District Council	Public library	Feilding
Far North District Libraries	Far North District Council	Public library	Kaikohe
Featherston Public Library	South Wairarapa District Council	Public library	Featherston
Flaxmere Public Library	Hastings District Council	Public library	Hastings
Gore District Libraries	Gore District Council	Public library	Gore
Govett-Brewster Art Gallery	Govett-Brewster Art Gallery	Public library	New Plymouth
Granity Community Library	Volunteer	Public library	Granity
Grey District Library	Grey District Council	Public library	Greymouth
Greytown Public Library	South Wairarapa District Council	Public library	Greytown
Hamilton City Libraries	Hamilton City Libraries	Public library	Hamilton
Hastings District Libraries	Hastings District Council	Public library	Hastings
Hauraki District Libraries	Hauraki District Council	Public library	Paeroa
Hauraki District Libraries	Hauraki District Council	Public library	Paeroa
Havelock North Public Library	Hastings District Council	Public library	Havelock North
H.B. Williams Memorial Library	Gisborne District Council	Public library	Gisborne
H. E. Holland Memorial Library	Volunteers	Public library	Seddonville
Horowhenua Library Trust	Horowhenua Library Trust	Public library	Levin
Hurunui District Libraries	Hurunui District Council	Public library	Amberley
Hutt City Libraries	Hutt City Council	Public library	Lower Hutt
Inangahua County Library	Volunteers	Public library	Inangahua
Invercargill City Libraries	Invercargill City Council	Public library	Invercargill
Kawerau District Library	Kawerau District Council	Public library	Kawerau
Kaikōura District Library	Kaikōura District Council	Public library	Kaikōura
Kapiti District Libraries	Kapiti District Council	Public library	Paraparaumu
Karamea War Memorial Library	Volunteers	Public library	Karamea
Katikati Public Library	Western Bay of Plenty District Council	Public library	Katikati
Mackenzie Community Library	Mackenzie Community Library	Public library	Fairlie
Manukau Libraries (now part of Auckland Libraries)	Auckland Council	Public library	Auckland
Masterton District Library	Masterton District Council	Public library	Masterton
Matamata-Piako District Libraries	Matamata-Piako District Council	Public library	Morrinsville
Matamata Public Library	Matamata-Piako District Council	Public library	Matamata
Marlborough District Libraries	Marlborough District Council	Public library	Blenheim
Rangitikei District Council Libraries	Rangitikei District Council	Public library	Marton
Mangakino Public Library	Taupō District Council	Public library	Mangakino
Māpua Community Library	Māpua Community	Public library	Māpua
Morrinsville Public Library	Matamata-Piako District Council	Public library	Morrinsville
Martinborough Public Library	South Wairarapa District Council	Public library	Martinborough
Napier Libraries	Napier Public Library	Public library	Napier
Ngaruawahia Public Library	Waikato District Council	Public library	Ngaruawahia
Nelson Public Libraries	Nelson Public Libraries	Public library	Nelson
Puke Ariki - New Plymouth District Libraries	New Plymouth District Council	Public library	New Plymouth
Oamaru Public Library	Waitaki District Council	Public library	Oamaru
Opotiki District Library	Opotiki District Council	Public library	Opotiki
Ōtorohanga District Library	Ōtorohanga District Council	Public library	Ōtorohanga
The Sir Edmund Hillary Public Library (Papakura Library)	Auckland Council	Public library	Auckland
Porirua Public Library	Porirua City Council	Public library	Porirua
Palmerston North City Library	Palmerston North City Council	Public library	Palmerston North
Queenstown Lakes District Library	Queenstown Lakes District Council	Public library	Queenstown
Ruapehu District Libraries	Ruapehu District Council	Public library	Taumarunui
Ohakune Public Library	Ruapehu District Council	Public library	Ohakune
Raglan Library	Waikato District Council	Public library	Raglan
Raetihi Public Library	Ruapehu District Council	Public library	Raetihi
Rotorua District Library	Rotorua District Council	Public library	Rotorua
Selwyn Library	Selwyn District Council	Public library	Rolleston
Southland District Libraries	Southland District Council	Public library	Winton
South Taranaki District Libraries C/- Hawera Public Library Plus	South Taranaki District Council	Public library	Hāwera
Stratford & District Centennial Library	Stratford District Council	Public library	Stratford
Sue Thomson Casey Memorial Library	Buller District Council	Public library	Westport
Tararua District Library	Dannevirke, Eketahuna, Pahiatua and Woodville Public Libraries	Public library	Dannevirke
Tasman District Libraries	Tasman District Council	Public library	Richmond, Nelson
Taupō District Libraries	Taupō District Council	Public library	Taupō
Tauranga City Libraries	Tauranga City Council	Public library	Tauranga
Te Aroha Public Library	Matamata-Piako District Council	Public library	Te Aroha
Te Kuiti Public Library	Waitomo District Council	Public library	Te Kūiti
Thames Public Library	Thames Coromandel District Council	Public library	Thames
Timaru District Library	Timaru District Council	Public library	Timaru
Tokoroa Public Library	South Waikato District Council	Public library	Tokoroa
Trevor Inch Memorial Library	Waimakariri District Council	Public library	Rangiora
Turangi	Taupō District Council	Public library	Tūrangi
Twizel Community Library	Mackenzie District Council	Public library	Twizel
Upper Hutt City Library	Upper Hutt City Council	Public library	Upper Hutt
Waikato District Libraries	Waikato District Council	Public library	Te Kauwhata
Waipukurau Public Library	Central Hawkes Bay District Council	Public library	Waipukurau
Waipa District Libraries	Waipa District Council	Public library	Cambridge
Waipa District Libraries, Te Awamutu	Waipa District Council	Public library	Te Awamutu
Wānaka Public Library	Queenstown Lakes District Council	Public library	Wānaka
Wanganui District Library	Wanganui District Council	Public library	Wanganui
Western Bay of Plenty District Libraries	Western Bay of Plenty District Council	Public library	Katikati
Westland District Library	Westland District Council	Public library	Hokitika
Whangarei Libraries	Whangarei Council	Public library	Whangārei
Whakatane District Libraries	Whakatane District Council	Public library	Whakatane
Waimate Public Library	Waimate District Council	Public library	Waimate
Wairoa Centennial Library	Wairoa District Council	Public library	Wairoa
Wellington City Libraries	Wellington City Council	Public library	Wellington
ESR Mt Albert Science Centre, Information and Research Services	ESR	Research	Auckland
New Zealand Heavy Engineering Research Association (HERA) Information Centre	NZ Heavy Engineering Research Association Library	Research	Manukau City
Auckland Landcare Research Library	Landcare Research	Research	Auckland
Plant & Food Research Mt Albert Library	HortResearch	Research	Auckland
ESR Christchurch Science Centre, Information and Research Services	ESR	Research	Christchurch
LIC Library	Livestock Improvement	Research	Hamilton
Landcare Research New Zealand Ltd Library	Landcare Research	Research	Canterbury
Rafter Library	GNS Science	Research	Lower Hutt
Industrial Research Ltd. Information Service	Industrial Research	Research	Lower Hutt
Plant & Food Research Palmerston North Library	Crop and Food	Research	Palmerston North
Fonterra Research Centre Limited, Library	Fonterra	Research	Palmerston North
ESR Kenepuru Science Centre, Information and Research Services	ESR	Research	Porirua
Leather & Shoe Research Association Library	New Zealand Leather & Shoe Research Association	Research	Palmerston North
National Forestry Library	Scion Group	Research	Rotorua
AgResearch Information Services - Knowledge, Ruakura Research Centre	AgResearch	Research	Hamilton
Wairakei Research Centre Library	GNS Science	Research	Taupō
BRANZ Library	BRANZ	Research	Porirua
New Zealand Institute of Economic Research Library	NZ Institute of Economic Research	Research	Wellington
	New Zealand Council for Educational Research	Research	Wellington
Geology & Geophysics Library	GNS Science	Research	Lower Hutt
Cement & Concrete Association of New Zealand Library	Cement & Concrete Association of New Zealand	Research	Wellington
NIWA Wellington Library	NIWA	Research	Wellington
Royal New Zealand Foundation of the Blind Library	Royal New Zealand Foundation of the Blind	Special libraries	Auckland
American Reference Center	American Reference Center	Special libraries	Wellington
ACC Information Services	Accident Compensation Corporation	Special libraries	Wellington
Radio New Zealand Library	Radio New Zealand	Special libraries	Wellington
Library	Barnardos New Zealand	Special libraries	Wellington
Nola Millar Library	Toi Whakaari: NZ Drama School	Special libraries	Wellington
Library	Sport and Recreation New Zealand	Special libraries	Wellington
Parkyn Library	Whitecliffe College of Arts and Design	Tertiary	Auckland
AIS St Helens Library	AIS St Helens	Tertiary	Auckland
Taylors College	Taylors College	Tertiary	Auckland
Te Wananga Takiura o nga Kura Kaupapa o Aotearoa	Te Wananga Takiura o nga Kura Kaupapa o Aotearoa	Tertiary	Auckland
Te Wananga o Aotearoa	Te Wananga o Aotearoa	Tertiary	Hamilton
Vision Leadership Library	Vision Leadership College	Tertiary	Hamilton
	Pacific International Hotel Management School	Tertiary	New Plymouth
Te Wananga o Raukawa & Te Whare Pukapuka	Te Wananga o Raukawa & Te Whare Pukapuka	Tertiary	Otaki
New Zealand School of Export	New Zealand School of Export	Tertiary	Palmerston North
International Pacific College Library	International Pacific College	Tertiary	Palmerston North
Queenstown Resort College Library	Queenstown Resort College	Tertiary	Queenstown
Bethlehem Institute Library	Bethlehem Institute	Tertiary	Tauranga
The Salvation Army Booth College of Mission Library	The Salvation Army		
Te Whare Wananga o Awanuiarangi Library	Te Whare Wananga o Awanuiarangi	Tertiary	Whakatane
Deane Memorial Library	Bible College of New Zealand	Theological	Auckland
Good Shepherd College, Colin Library	Good Shepherd College	Theological	Auckland
Catholic Diocese of Auckland Library	Auckland Catholic Diocese	Theological	Auckland
Theology House Library	Theology House	Theological	Christchurch
Hewitson Library	Knox College	Theological	Dunedin
John Kinder Theological Library	St John's Theological College	Theological	Auckland
Albany Campus Library	Massey University	University	Auckland
Sylvia Ashton-Warner Education Library	University of Auckland	University	Auckland
AUT University Library	Auckland University of Technology	University	Auckland
General Library	University of Auckland	University	Auckland
Architecture Library	University of Auckland	University	Auckland
Fine Arts Library	University of Auckland	University	Auckland
Engineering Library	University of Auckland	University	Auckland
Davis Law Library	University of Auckland	University	Auckland
Philson Medical Library	University of Auckland	University	Auckland
Geography Department Library	University of Canterbury	University	Christchurch
Education Library	University of Canterbury	University	Christchurch
Central Library	University of Canterbury	University	Christchurch
Engineering Library	University of Canterbury	University	Christchurch
Law Library	University of Canterbury	University	Christchurch
Macmillan Brown Library	University of Canterbury	University	Christchurch
Physical Sciences Library	University of Canterbury	University	Christchurch
Southland Campus Library	Dunedin College of Education	University	Invercargill
Central Library	University of Otago	University	Dunedin
Dental Library	University of Otago	University	Dunedin
Hocken Collections	University of Otago	University	Dunedin
Robert Stout Law Library	University of Otago	University	Dunedin
Medical Library	University of Otago	University	Dunedin
Science Library	University of Otago	University	Dunedin
Central Library	University of Waikato	University	Hamilton
Lincoln University Library	Lincoln University	University	Canterbury
Massey University Library	Massey University	University	Palmerston North
Wellington Campus Library	Massey University	University	Wellington
WJ Scott Library	Victoria University of Wellington	University	Wellington
Central Library	Victoria University of Wellington	University	Wellington
Law Library	Victoria University of Wellington	University	Wellington
Lesbian and Gay Archives of New Zealand	National Library of New Zealand	Research	Wellington
