= Hamilton Library (disambiguation) =

Hamilton Library is the largest research library in the state of Hawaii.

Hamilton Library may also refer to:

- Hamilton Public Library, in Hamilton, Ontario, Canada
- Hamilton City Libraries, in Hamilton, Waikato, New Zealand
