= Grey District Library =

Public library in Greymouth, New Zealand

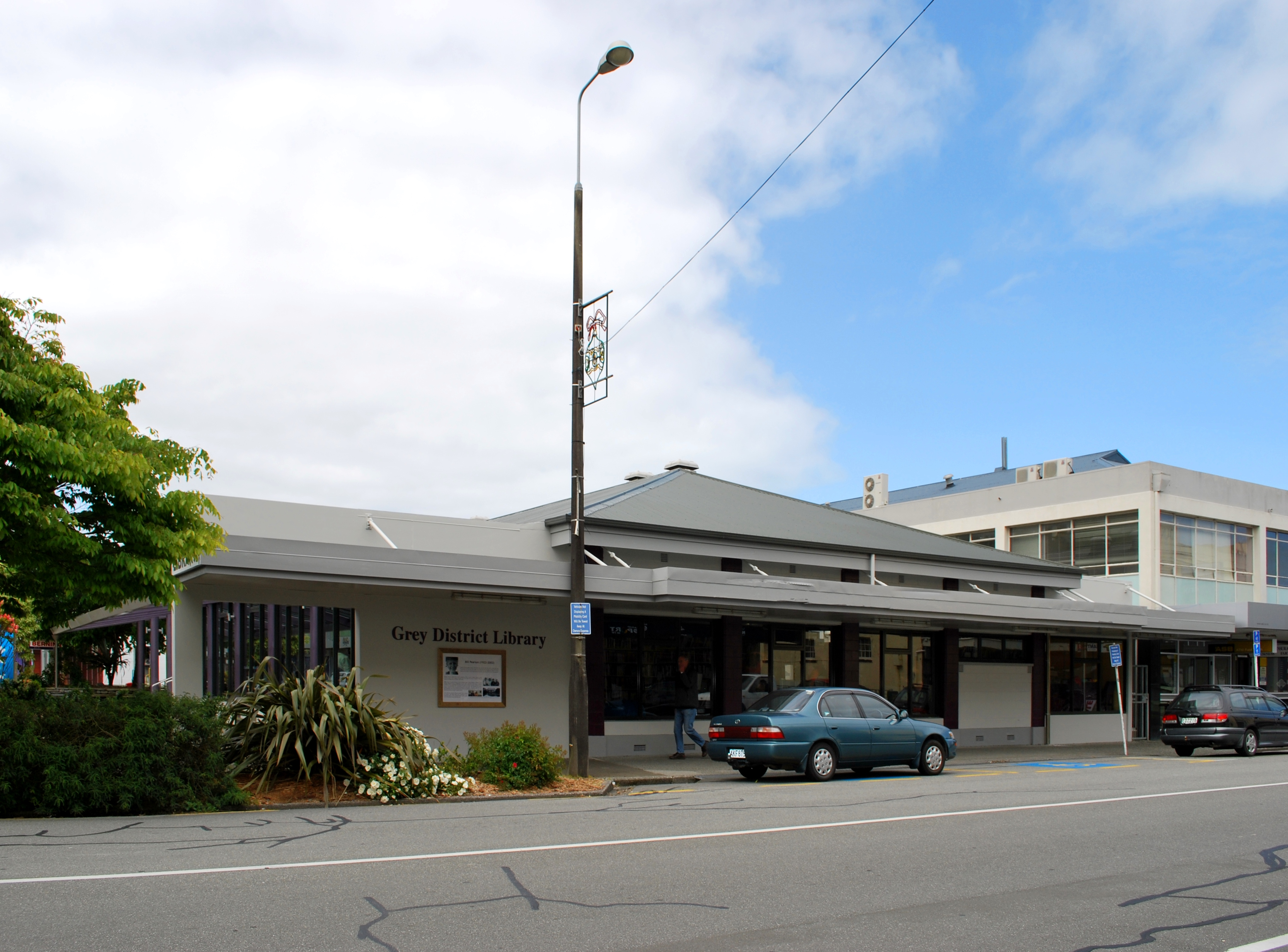
- Grey District Library in 2011
- 42°26′55″S 171°12′37″E
- Location: Greymouth

Other information
- Website: https://www.greydc.govt.nz/libraries

The Grey District Library, also known as the Greymouth Public Library, is a public library located in Greymouth in the West Coast region of the South Island of New Zealand.

== History ==
The Greymouth Library began as the Greymouth Literary Association in 1868. With an annual fee of £2 5s and membership by ballot, the club was not accessible to most citizens. Three years later the association was changed to the Greymouth Literary Society, with a public membership and a public library.

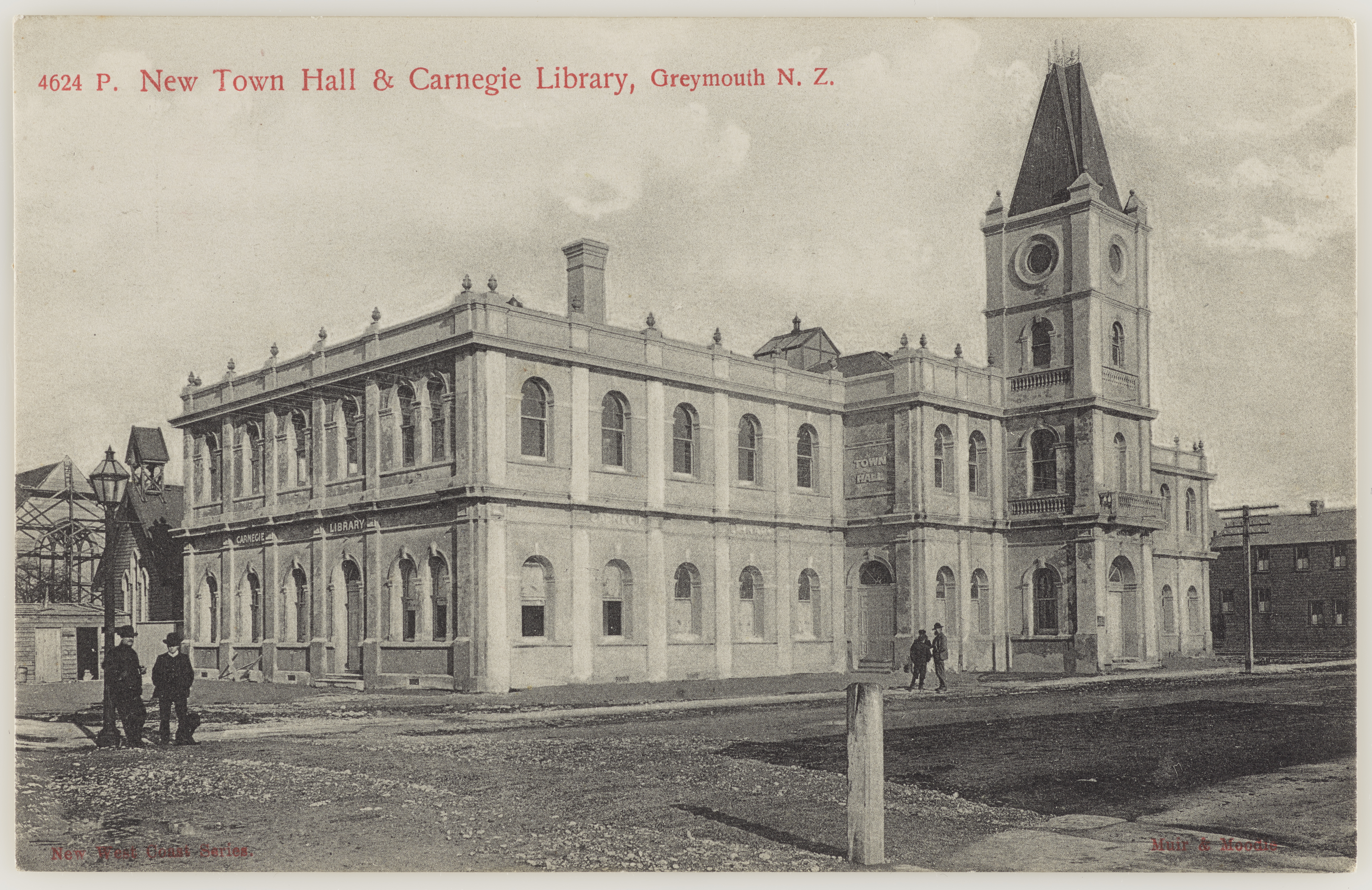
Greymouth Town Hall. The entrance to the Carnegie Library wing can be seen on the left.

By 1887 the society had a public library and reading-rooms in the Masonic Hall on Mackay Street. However, in September 1887 fire destroyed the Hall. The reading-rooms, books and furniture had been insured for £200.

In the early 1900s the council had approved the building of a new town hall and council offices, however the cost was prohibitive. After applying to Andrew Carnegie for funds to add a library wing to the building, a grant of £2250 was received in 1906. The building, designed by architect Edward Iveagh Lord, was the largest brick building on the West Coast, and had a 21.5 metres (71 ft) clock tower.

By 1936 the library included a children's library on the ground floor.

The entire town hall and library were destroyed by arson on 19 July 1947. Most of the books and some of the furniture were able to be saved.

== Collection ==
The current library building on Albert Street contains a collection of books, magazines, DVDs, computers, a scanner, and also WiFi. The library provides classes on digital literacy and related topics through its Book-A-Librarian program, a storytime session for pre-school children, a summer reading challenge and other events. Its website has eBooks, Audiobooks, and eMagazines, as well as links to resources such as Te Ara, the National Library of New Zealand, and Stats NZ.
