= McGuinness Institute =

New Zealand sustainability think tank

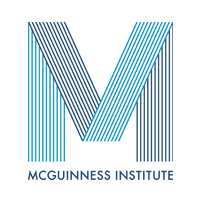
- Formation: 2004
- Type: Policy think tank
- Location: Wellington, New Zealand
- Chief Executive: Wendy McGuinness
- Website: mcguinnessinstitute.org
- Formerly called: Sustainable Future Institute

The McGuinness Institute Te Hononga Waka is a non-partisanal think tank based in Wellington, New Zealand, working towards a sustainable future, contributing strategic foresight through evidence-based research and policy analysis. Established in 2004 by Wendy McGuinness, the Institute endeavours to undertake research that is independent, innovative and relevant, in a professional manner. Previously the Sustainable Future Institute, it changed its name in February 2012.

The McGuinness Institute produces publications in the form of research reports, think pieces, newsletters, submissions, working papers, and filmed interviews. As a registered charitable trust, the McGuinness Institute is required to produce annual reports detailing its financial statements.

== Project 2058 ==
Started in 2008, Project 2058 has the strategic aim of promoting integrated long-term thinking, leadership and capacity building so that New Zealand can effectively explore and manage risks and opportunities into the year 2058. The project is divided into a series of reports, each covering an important aspect of New Zealand's future. Within Project 2058, the Institute maintains a number of other ongoing projects. These are divided into policy projects and research projects.

== Policy projects ==
=== Project ForesightNZ ===
Project ForesightNZ aims to build public policy capability in New Zealand by encouraging long-term, agile thinking around our uncertain future. Initiated in 2008, ForesightNZ is about conceptualising the broad range of possible futures for New Zealand through up-to-date tools and conceptual approaches used in the field of futures studies. The project is carried out through a number of publications and events. The 2016 ForesightNZ: Untangling New Zealand’s long-term future workshop was a collaboration between the New Zealand Treasury and the McGuinness Institute. The ForesightNZ playing cards were this workshop's primary output. The 2017 WakaNZ: Navigating with foresight workshop was also a collaboration between the McGuinness Institute and the New Zealand Treasury and explored what a preferred future might look like in a post-Treaty of Waitangi settlement New Zealand.

=== Project ReportingNZ ===
Project ReportingNZ aims to contribute to a discussion on how to build an informed society. ReportingNZ began in 2016 and formed a major project of the Institute's work programme in 2017 and 2018. The significant pieces of work in this project are the Government Department Strategy (GDS) Index and two surveys and accompanying publications on Extended External Reporting (EER) in collaboration with the External Reporting Board.

=== Project StrategyNZ ===
Project StrategyNZ aims to contribute to a discussion on how to improve strategic decision-making, strategy stewardship and implementation in both the private and the public sector. This project has two parts that look at how New Zealand can improve long-term strategic thinking and strategy stewardship. The first is exploring a national sustainable development strategy for New Zealand, which began in 2006 and led to a workshop in March 2011 called StrategyNZ: Mapping our Future. This workshop in turn lead to the formation of the research project TalentNZ based on a quote from speaker Sir Paul Callaghan about creating ‘a place where talent wants to live’. The second aspect of Project StrategyNZ explores strategy stewardship in the New Zealand public sector and involves the GDS Index and the upcoming Project 2058 Report 15: Strengthening Strategy Stewardship in the Public Service.

== Research projects ==
=== Project CivicsNZ ===
Project CivicsNZ aims to build the social capital and empowerment of New Zealand citizens. Work in this project has involved building a constitution for the twenty-first century in the EmpowerNZ initiative, with workshops in 2012 and 2013, and more recently involves discussion around civic education. The CivicsNZ project is also linked to the TacklingPovertyNZ project and included a workshop evening in 2017 and publication of a think piece and working paper in 2018. CivicsNZ works to promote good civics education that showcases the machinery of government and empowers citizens through a shared understanding of our common rights and responsibilities.

=== Project ClimateChangeNZ ===
Project ClimateChangeNZ aims to explore a climate strategy for New Zealand. This project works to provide young people with a platform to enable them to amplify their thinking and have their voices heard. See, for example, the 2019 KiMuaNZ: Exploring Climate Futures workshop. In 2019, the Institute published a discussion paper on a Climate Reporting Emergency. In 2020, the Institute hosted a webinar with Mark Carney in conversation with Adrian Orr (Reserve Bank) and Hon James Shaw. They discussed rapid pathways to achieve New Zealand’s transition to a low-carbon future, with a particular focus on the Recommendations of the Task Force on Climate-related Financial Disclosures (TCFD). The current work programme also includes a number of climate-related papers, including a Project 2058 report on climate change reporting.

=== Project EcologicalCorridorsNZ ===
EcologicalCorridorsNZ aims to contribute to the discussion on how Aotearoa New Zealand might implement ecological corridors. Ecological corridors (also known as biological or wildlife corridors) are protected areas that connect species’ habitats (or link protected areas, such as reserves or national parks). The Institute is working on a project to develop ecological corridors which would connect national parks along the length of Aotearoa.

=== Project GlobalConflictNZ ===
GlobalConflictNZ aims to contribute to the discussion on how to improve New Zealand's resilience to international conflict and war (including nuclear war).

=== Project OneOceanNZ ===
Project One Ocean NZ aims to contribute to a wider discussion on how we might best manage our oceans, and exercise stewardship in order to maintain a healthy and productive ocean. It looks at public policy solutions around ocean governance as an important long-term issue for New Zealand. The Institute has a particular focus on conservation efforts in the Cook Strait and Marlborough Sounds regions, due to an ongoing case study of New Zealand King Salmon’s (NZKS) Blue Endeavour application. As a part of this case study, the Institute has developed a series of infographics designed to be read in conjunction with one another, highlighting key information about NZKS’s salmon farming, the biodiversity and existing conservation efforts in the area, as well as around Aotearoa New Zealand generally. The Institute has made a number of submissions as part of this project and also facilitated the formation of the New Zealand Antarctic Youth Council.

=== Project PandemicNZ ===
Pandemic NZ is a McGuinness Institute project that aims to help New Zealand prepare for future pandemics, as well as manage and learn from the COVID-19 pandemic. It draws together early Institute publications as well as an increasingly comprehensive suite of research and publications into the COVID-19 pandemic. As part of this project the Institute has also published two editions of COVID-19 Nation Dates: A New Zealand timeline of significant events during the COVID-19 pandemic.

=== Project PublicScienceNZ ===
PublicScienceNZ is a project that aims to contribute to the limited dialogue concerning the government-funded science system, in the hope that New Zealand invests its research dollar well and delivers sustainable outcomes for current and future generations. The project was established in 2012 and is ongoing. PublicScienceNZ also brings together the Institute's previous work on genetic modification policy and regulations, and pandemic management. In 2020, The Institute made headlines as it publicly called for the country's hospitals to release their full stocktake lists of all protective equipment supplies, due to concerns that the country was not sufficiently prepared for a pandemic.

=== Project ScenariosNZ ===
Scenarios NZ aims to contribute to the discussions that help inform decision-makers using scenarios to explore the long-term future. One publication on this project is Working Paper 2023/01 – List of publicly available national and local scenarios as at 31 December 2022.

=== Project TacklingPovertyNZ ===
The Tackling Poverty NZ research project aims to contribute to a national conversation on how to reduce poverty in New Zealand. This project began in 2015 with a workshop in December at the New Zealand Treasury. Since then, the Institute has held six more workshops throughout New Zealand, with the goal of gathering local perspectives on poverty. From this tour, the Institute sent a proposal to Prime Minister Bill English at the end of 2016 concerning the creation of demarcated zones for public policy innovation in three of the areas visited on the workshop tour. The proposal garnered some coverage in the New Zealand media.

=== Project TalentNZ ===
Project TalentNZ aims to contribute to Sir Paul Callaghan’s vision of making New Zealand ‘a place where talent wants to live’. Project TalentNZ began in 2011 at a StrategyNZ workshop with Sir Paul Callaghan’s keynote speech. Since then, the Institute has published the TalentNZ Journal and developed a Menu of Initiatives, which illustrates New Zealand’s talent ecosystem and lays out action points for growing, attracting, retaining and connecting talented individuals.

=== Project WaterFuturesNZ ===
WaterFuturesNZ is a research project that aims to contribute to the wider discussion on how we might design safe, accessible and reliable water services for Aotearoa New Zealand. One of the publications in this project was Think Piece 39 – Three Waters: New body corporate model reduces government accountability.

== Project Nation Dates ==
In 2011 the Institute published Nation Dates, a book that presents a timeline of significant events that have shaped New Zealand as a nation. The second edition was published in 2012, the third edition was published in 2017, the fourth edition was published in 2020 and the fifth edition was published in 2023.

A special edition called COVID-19 Nation Dates: A New Zealand timeline of significant events during the COVID-19 pandemic was first published in 2023 with a second edition in 2024. This series aims to provide insights by recording the impact of COVID-19 in Aotearoa New Zealand between January 2020 to mid- to late 2024.

== Workshops ==
One of the McGuinness Institute's core values is to provide platforms and opportunities for New Zealanders, with a particular focus on amplifying the voices of young people aged between 18 and 25. McGuinness Institute workshops are the primary tool for achieving this. The workshops focus on public policy issues that are strategic, complex, and long-term in nature.

== James Duncan Reference Library ==
The James Duncan Reference Library is located at the office of McGuinness Institute in Wellington. Named after the former Chair of the Commission for the Future, Professor James Duncan (1921–2001), the library was established to provide a record of long-term thinking in New Zealand. The library and archive house over 5000 books and publications on New Zealand’s future-thinking initiatives and historical development, the theory and practice of future-thinking, strategy development, and national and international perspectives. The Institute believes that New Zealand’s future must build on its past and this is why recording history is important. The library is open to the public, however bookings must be made in advance.
