= Karamea War Memorial Library =

Library in Karamea, New Zealand

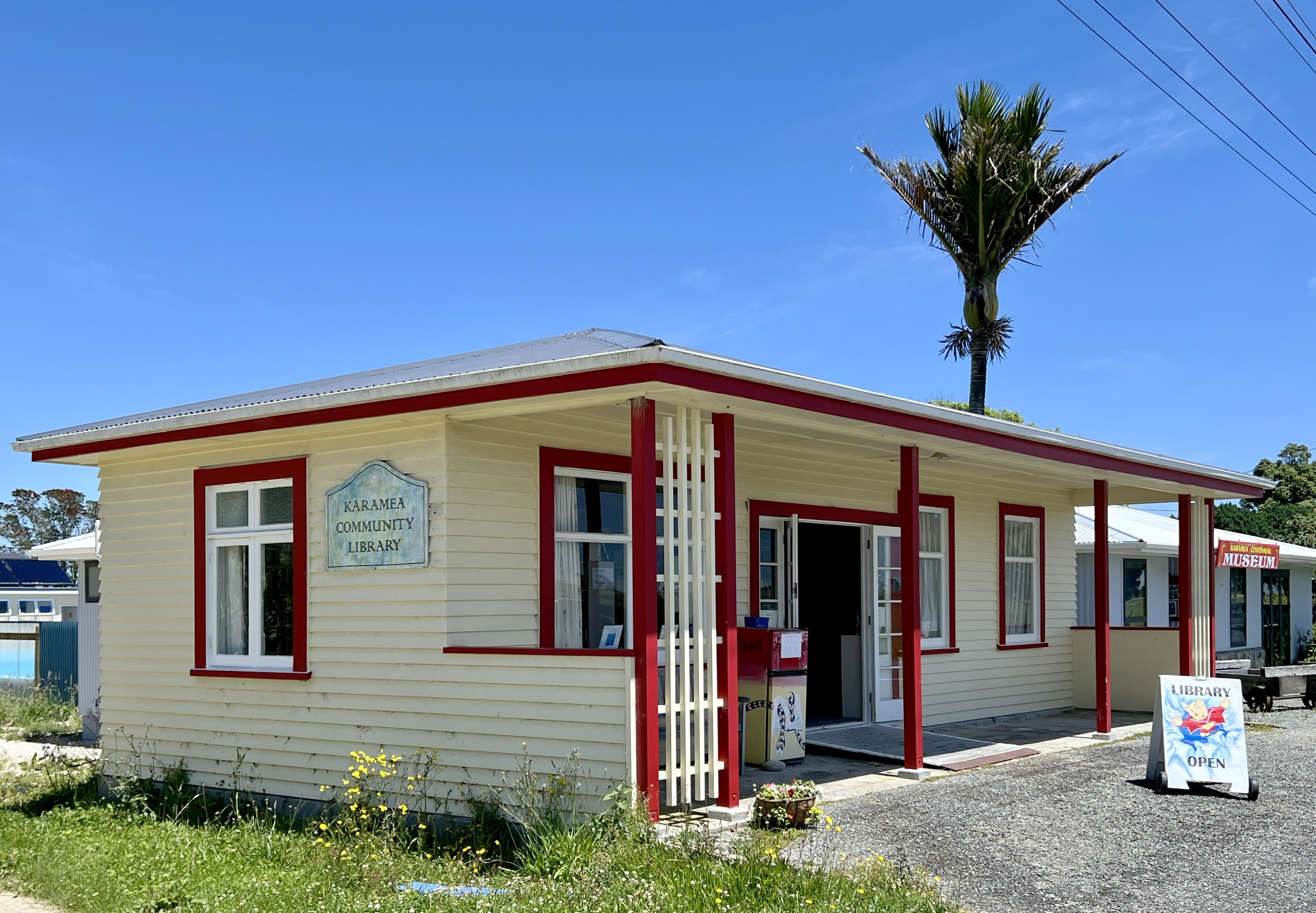
- Interactive map of the Karamea War Memorial Library area
- Alternative names: Karamea War Memorial Library and Plunket Rooms, Karamea Community Library

General information
- Type: Library
- Location: Karamea, Waverly Street, Karamea
- Coordinates: 41°14′56″S 172°07′06″E
- Opened: 1954

Technical details
- Floor count: Single storey

Karamea War Memorial Library, also known as Karamea Community Library, is a community public library located in the settlement of Karamea in the West Coast region of the South Island of New Zealand.

The library was built in 1954 using a government grant which funded World War II memorial projects, matching donations pound for pound. It was built by volunteer labour on land donated by the Nelson Education Board. There was some competition for the grant, with the Returned and Services' Association wanting funding for a building newly-moved to Market Cross for their use. At the time, Karamea had no library, and the Plunket Society since the 1940s was using a small building on the current library site.

At first the building was divided between Plunket and the library, and administered by a committee of five (two from Plunket, two representing the library and an independent chairman); there was some concern over "scholars misusing the Plunket Rooms for smok-ing." Funding was always an issue: a "Talent Quest and Novelty Dance" in 1966 raised £34, and the following year a concert raised £31. In later years the committee separated into War Memorial and Library committees, but these were merged in 2008 and the library once again known as the War Memorial Library.

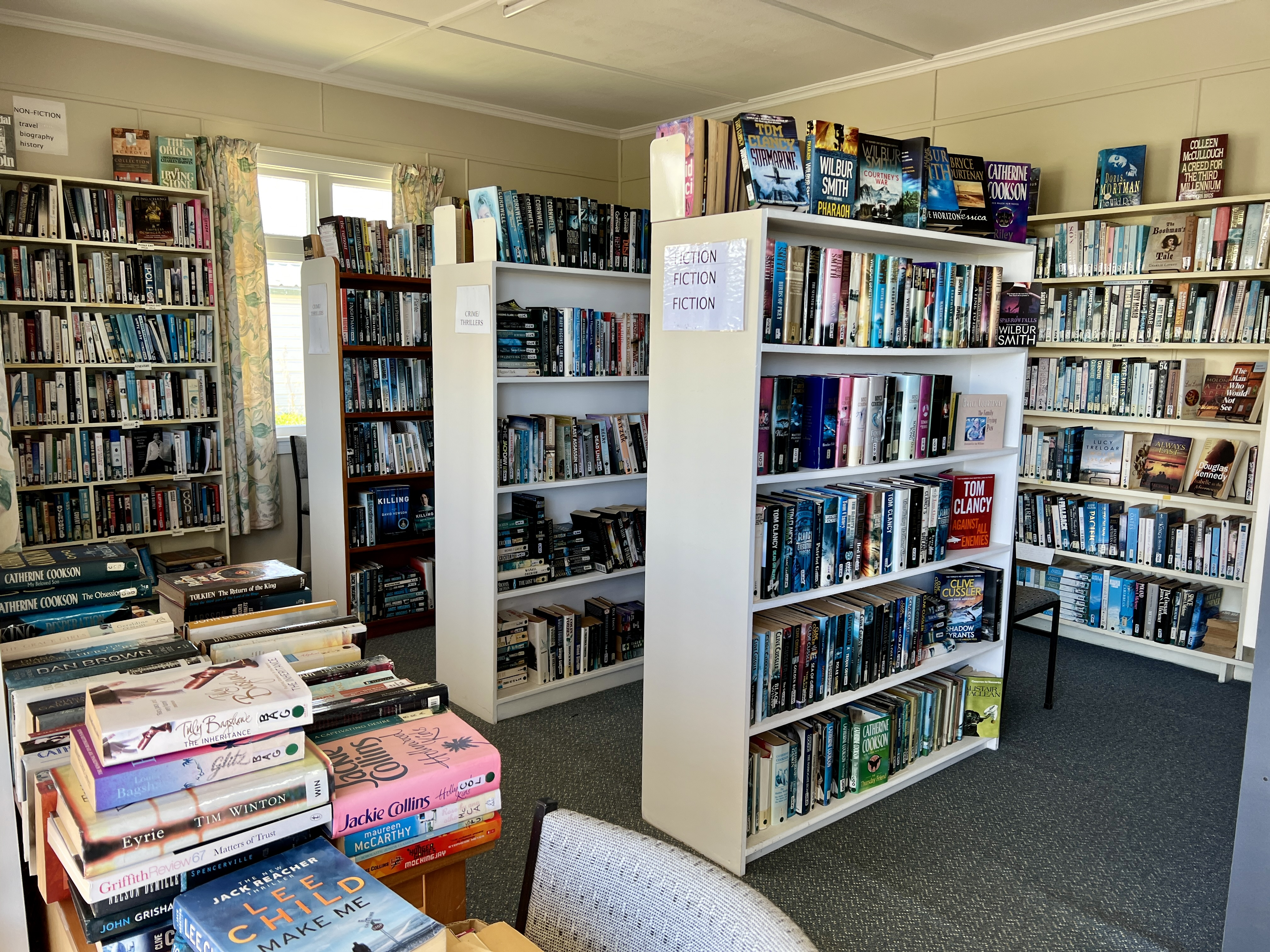
Library interior

After Plunket ceased operations in Karamea in the 1970s, a District Nurse operated out of the old Plunket rooms, as well as St John's. After they moved out, the library took over the whole building, and in the 1990s the partition was removed, French doors installed in the front, and the building renovated by Taskforce Green.

The library is currently open three days a week, and is run entirely by volunteers, supported by a subscription service for members, with no lending fees or overdue fines. There were 35 members in 2005, over 40 in 2008, and 40–50 by 2000. The collection is maintained through donations from local residents, and a rotating supply of items from the large Buller District Library in Westport.
