= Buddle Findlay =

Commercial law firm in New Zealand

- Headquarters: Auckland, Wellington, Christchurch
- No. of offices: 3
- Major practice areas: General Practice
- Date founded: 1895 (Wellington)
- Website: www.buddlefindlay.com

Buddle Findlay is a commercial law firm that operates throughout New Zealand, with offices in Auckland, Wellington, and Christchurch.

== History ==
The Wellington firm of Buller & Anderson (Arthur Percival Buller and John Anderson) was founded in 1895, and Findlay Dalziell & Co (John Findlay and Frederick George Dalziell) opened soon after in 1899. Buller & Anderson became Buddle Anderson Kent & Co (Thomas Buddle, John Anderson) following a series of mergers, while Findlay Dalziell & Co would eventually become Findlay Hoggard Richmond & Co. In 1982 the two firms merged to form Buddle Findlay. Four years later, the firm established an Auckland office through a merger with Malloy Moody & Greville, and a partial merger with Holmden Horrocks & Co. Through a merger with Christchurch firm Brookman Stock in 1989, the firm's Christchurch office was opened.

== Practice areas ==
Buddle Findlay is a full service firm, with teams operating in:

- Aviation
- Banking and financial services
- Competition and antitrust
- Construction and projects
- Corporate and commercial
- Employment
- Environment and resource management
- Health
- Health and safety
- Insurance
- Intellectual property
- Litigation and dispute resolution
- Local government
- Māori law
- Payments
- Privacy and data protection
- Property
- Public and administrative law
- Restructuring and insolvency
- Tax
- Technology, media and telecommunications
