= Sue Thomson Casey Memorial Library =

Public library in Westport, New Zealand

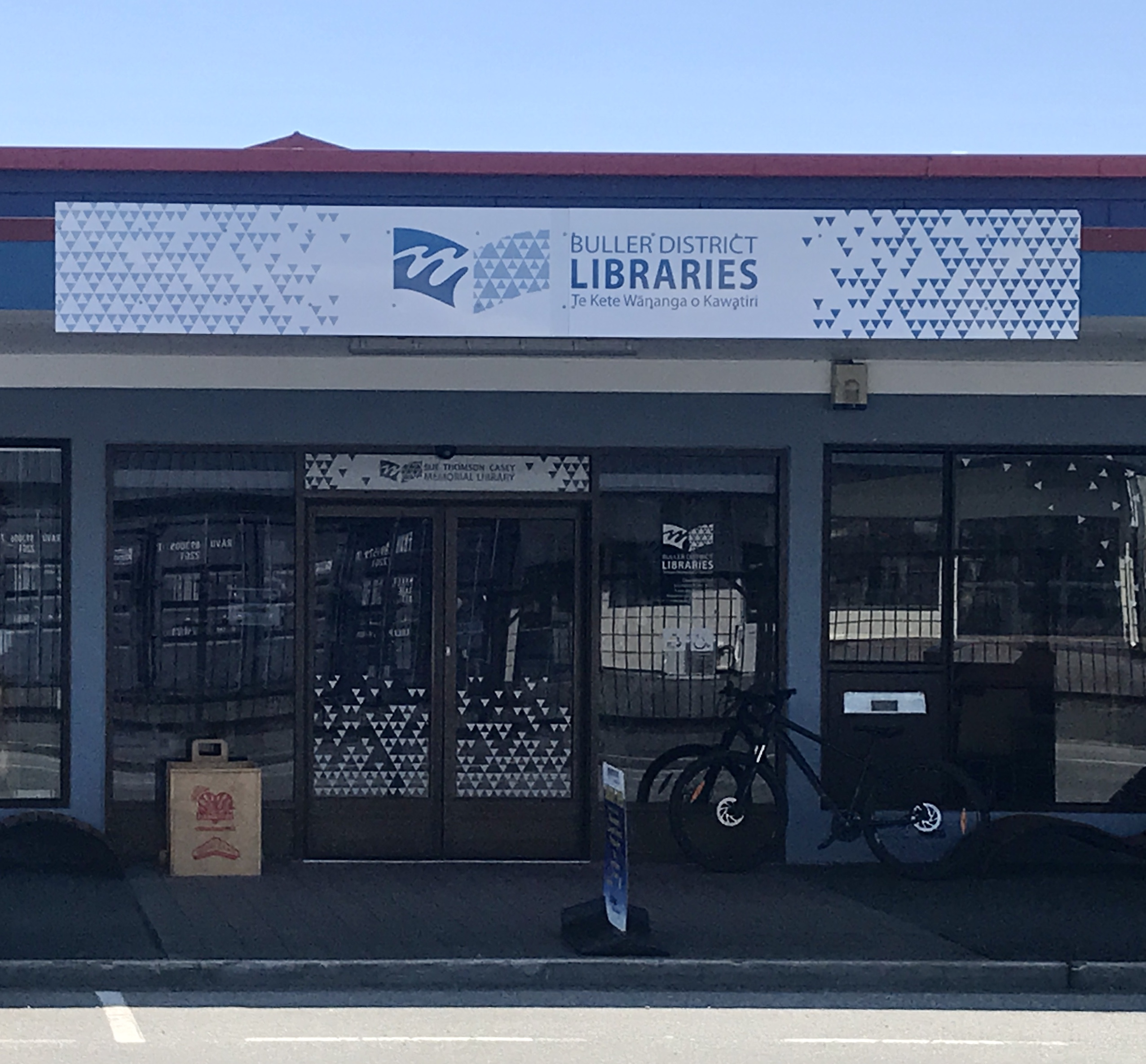
- Sue Thomson Casey Memorial Library in 2019
- Interactive map of the Sue Thomson Casey Memorial Library area

General information
- Type: Library
- Location: Westport, 87–89 Palmerston Street, Westport
- Coordinates: 41°45′06″S 171°35′53″E
- Opened: 1904 (Carnegie building); 2003 present building

Technical details
- Floor count: Single storey

The Sue Thomson Casey Memorial Library, also known as the Westport Library and the Buller District Library, is a district library located in Westport in the West Coast region of the South Island of New Zealand.

== History ==
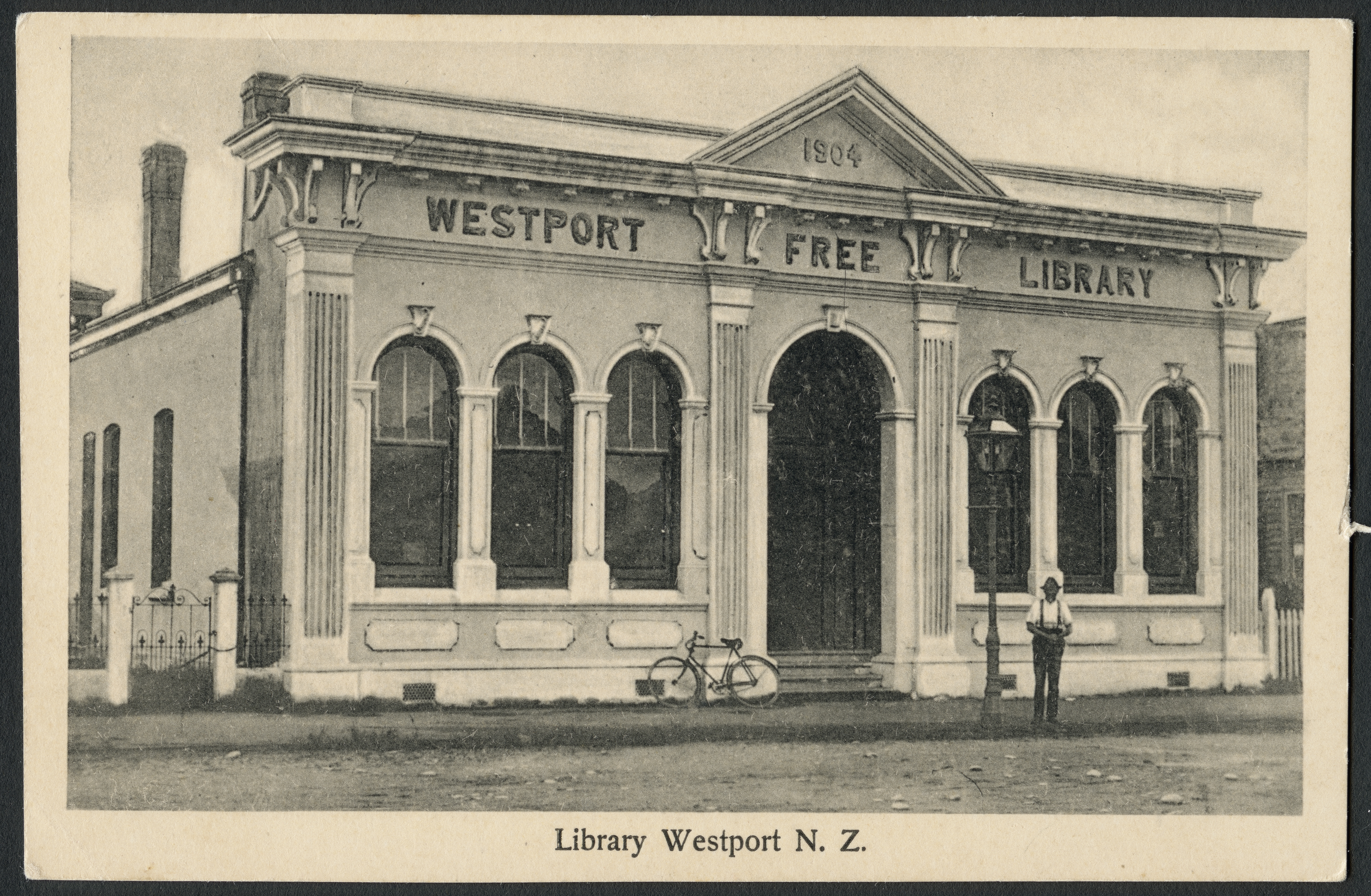
Westport Free Library circa 1910

The original Westport Library (whereabouts unknown) was destroyed by fire on New Year's Day of 1903, and in January an appeal was made by the Westport Borough Council to Andrew Carnegie for funds to rebuild the reading rooms and library.

The Auckland Library present the Westport Athenaeum with a gift of 150 volumes in February 1903, presumably to help replace the collection lost to the fire.

By August 1903 a request for further information was received, after which a group of estate agents wrote to Mr Carnegie proposing that the Canterbury Hall would make a suitable location and requesting to act as his agents in the purchase. By October the council received word that Mr Carnegie granted £2000 on condition that the council provided a free site for the building and raised a further £100 per year through a 1d rate. The gift was not universally welcomed but building went ahead and the new brick library on Lyndhurst Street was officially opened on 23 December 1904.

The collection eventually grew too large for the Carnegie building and moved to new premises on Palmerston Street in 2003. The Carnegie building is now a Category 2 registered building.

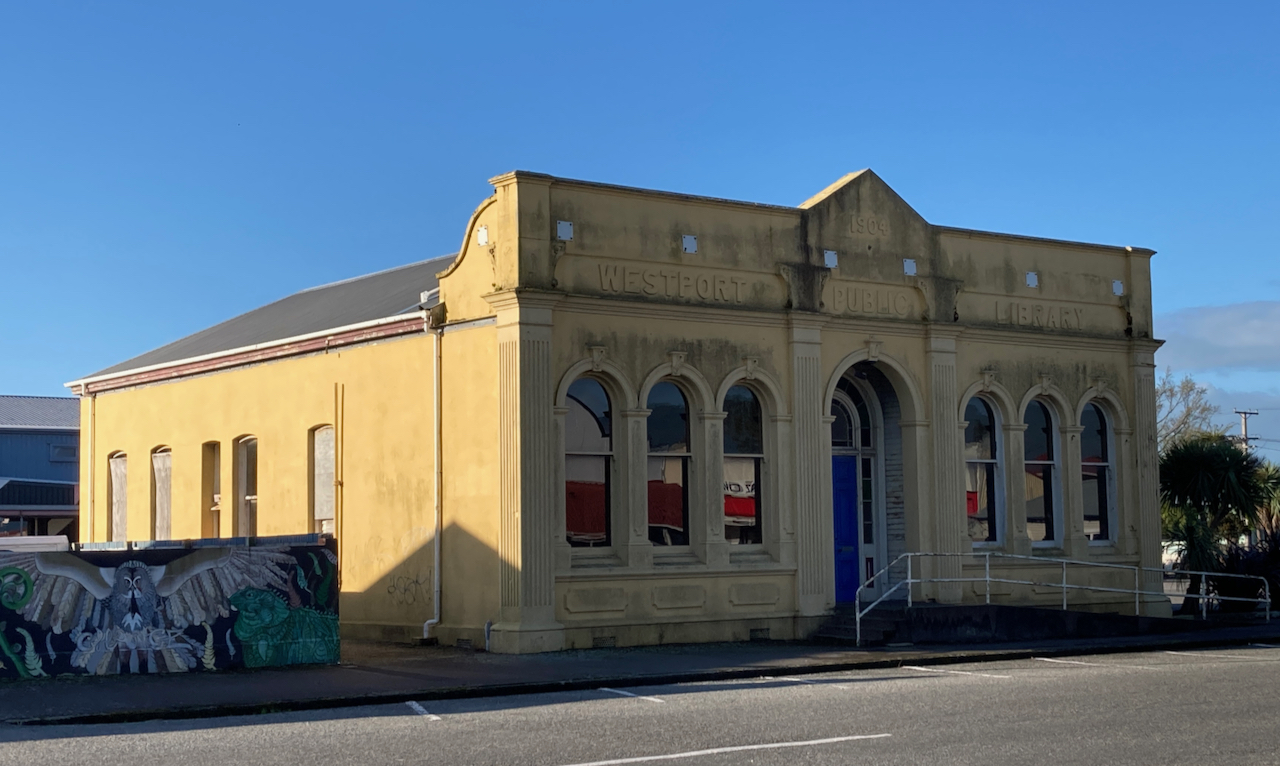
Carnegie library building in 2020

== Collection ==
In addition to the usual library collection of books, newspapers, DVDs, a local history collection and talking books, the library also loans jigsaws. The library has free Wifi, and conducts computer classes, book groups and a children's programme.

Membership of the library also allows access to the Inangahua county library in Reefton. The library supplies a rotating collection of items to the smaller Karamea War Memorial Library in Karamea.

In September 2019 the Buller District Council funded a community makeover of the library from their Revitalisation Fund.
