= Hamilton City Libraries =

Public libraries in Hamilton, New Zealand

Coordinates: 37.7879°S 175.2824°E

- Location: Hamilton, New Zealand
- Branches: Seven

Collection
- Size: over 400,000

Other information
- Director: Rebecca Whitehead
- Website: hamiltonlibraries.co.nz

Hamilton City Libraries is the city-council-owned public library system of the city of Hamilton, Waikato, New Zealand. The library lends fiction and non-fiction (for all ages), magazines, audiobooks, and DVDs.

From November 2016 to 9 July 2018, a substitute library compensated for the temporarily closed Central branch, and the libraries closed for over 2 months for COVID-19 in 2020. Waikato District residents living close to Hamilton City can freely use the Hamilton libraries.

== Public library history ==
In 1871 Hamilton Institute appointed a librarian, with support from Auckland Provincial Council. By 1874 its reading room had 209 books and 72 subscribers, but, although its books were largely saved from a fire, the secretary then decamped with the funds.

A poll under the Public Libraries Act 1869 rejected a rate to set up a library by 17:7 in 1883; without a council decision, the Act required at least 10 ratepayers to request a poll. Next year a new library was established by subscriptions in the Union Bridge toll house, tolls having ended in January 1883, and it was officially opened on 10 October 1884. A new building at the south end of Victoria Street opened on 22 April 1899. Andrew Carnegie library, designed by Rigby and Warren, opposite Garden Place, was opened by Sir Joseph Ward on 17 February 1908. By 1928 it had 892 subscribers and 10,000 books and, by 1948, 2,344 subscribers and 130,674 books. In June 1960 a new council building opened on Worley St and the library moved from the Carnegie site, which was sold. The Carnegie Library briefly became a Lions opp shop, before being demolished about 1961. In 1968 it moved to William Paul Hall, formerly the Waikato Winter Show building and has been in Garden Place since 20 March 1993.

Frankton Library officially opened on 22 September 1923 and in 1950 became a branch of Hamilton Public Library.

As of 1980, Hamilton had one of the country's largest public libraries.

== Branches ==
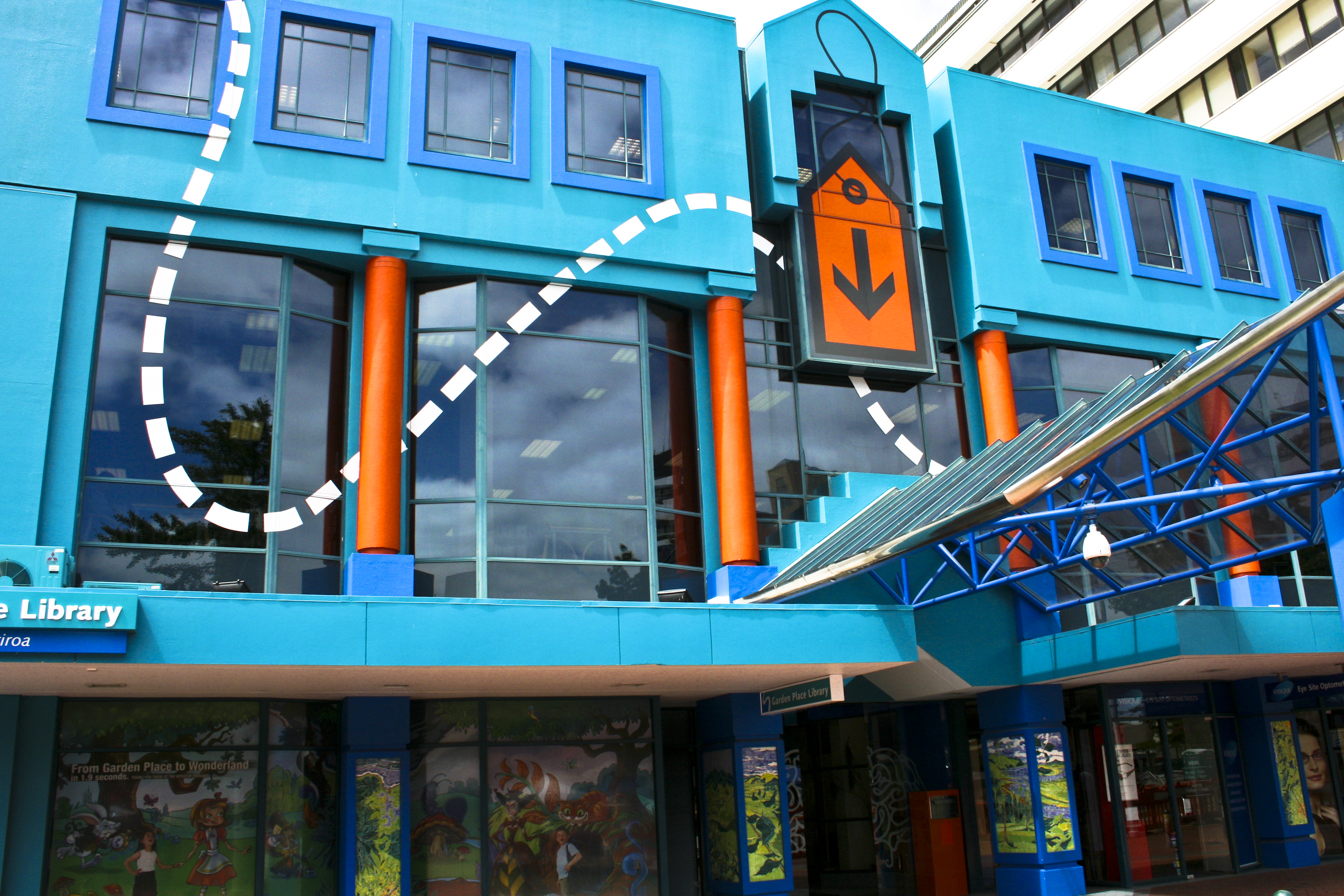
Hamilton Central Library, located in Garden Place, converted from the Arthur Barnett department store (former Drapery and General Importing Company - DIC) and opened on 20 March 1993. The facade is being replaced between August 2025 and February 2026

There are seven current branches:

Branch	Notes
Central Library - Te Koopuu Maania o Kirikiriroa	In November 2016, the Central branch was closed until 9 July 2018 for earthquake strengthening. A pop-up library operated temporarily out of the reception lounge in the nearby municipal building while the Central branch was closed.
Chartwell Library - Kukutaaruhe	Opened 10 September 1984.
Dinsdale Library - Te Tiwha O Pareiiriwhare	Opened 17 August 1985.
Glenview Library - Mangakootukutuku	Opened 8 November 1989.
Hillcrest Library - Manga-o-nua	Opened in August 1982 and moved to Masters Ave in 1997.
St Andrews Library - Waiwherowhero	Opened 23 February 1990, as a replacement for Frankton Library, on Hall Street, which was demolished about 1983 to make way for the new bridge over the railway.
Te Kete Aronui - Rototuna Library	Opened 21 July 2023.
