= List of rivers of New Zealand =

This is a list of all waterways named as rivers in New Zealand.

== A ==
- Aan River
- Acheron River (Canterbury)
- Acheron River (Marlborough)
- Ada River
- Adams River
- Ahaura River
- Ahuriri River
- Ahuroa River
- Akatarawa River
- Ākitio River
- Alexander River
- Alfred River
- Allen River
- Alma River
- Alph River (Ross Dependency)
- Anatoki River
- Anatori River
- Anaweka River
- Anne River
- Anti Crow River
- Aohanga River
- Aongatete River
- Aorangiwai River
- Aorere River
- Aparima River
- Arahura River
- Arapaoa River
- Arapārera River
- Arawhata River
- Arnold River
- Arnst River
- Aropaoanui River
- Arrow River
- Arthur River
- Ashburton River / Hakatere
- Ashley River / Rakahuri
- Avoca River (Canterbury)
- Avoca River (Hawke's Bay)
- Avon River / Ōtākaro
- Avon River (Marlborough)
- Awakari River
- Awakino River (Canterbury) and its East and West branches
- Awakino River (Northland)
- Awakino River (Waikato)
- Awanui River
- Awapoko River
- Awapoto River
- Awarau River
- Awaroa River (Far North)
- Awaroa River (Kaipara)
- Awaroa River (Waikato River tributary)
- Awaroa River (Kawhia Harbour tributary)
- Awaroa River (Tasman)
- Awarua River (Northland)
- Awarua River (Southland)
- Awatere River
- Awatere River (Gisborne)
- Awhea River

== B ==
- Balfour River
- Barlow River
- Barn River
- Barrier River
- Baton River
- Bealey River
- Beaumont River
- Beautiful River
- Bettne River
- Big River (Buller)
- Big River (Grey)
- Big River (Southland)
- Big River (Tasman)
- Big Wainihinihi River
- Blackwater River (Tasman)
- Blackwater River (Buller River tributary)
- Blackwater River (Little Grey River tributary)
- Blairich River
- Blind (Otūwhero) River
- Blue Duck River
- Blue Grey River
- Blue River
- Bluff River
- Blythe River
- Bonar River
- Boulder River
- Bowen River
- Boyle River
- Branch River (Taylor River tributary)
- Branch River (Wairau River tributary)
- Broken River
- Brown Grey River
- Brown River (Marlborough)
- Brown River (Tasman)
- Brown River (West Coast)
- Buller River
- Burke River
- Butler River

== C ==
- Callery River
- Cam River (Marlborough)
- Cam River
- Camelot River
- Cameron River
- Cape River
- Caples River
- Cardrona River
- Careys Creek
- Carrick River
- Cascade River
- Cass River (Mackenzie District)
- Cass River (Selwyn District)
- Castaly River
- Castle River (Marlborough)
- Castle River (Southland)
- Castle River (Wellington)
- Catlins River
- Cavendish River
- Charwell River
- Chatterton River
- Christopher River
- Clark River
- Clarke River (Grey District)
- Clarke River (Tasman)
- Clarke River (Westland District)
- Clearwater River
- Cleddau River
- Clinton River
- Clive River
- Clutha River
- Clyde River
- Coal River (Canterbury)
- Coal River (Fiordland)
- Cobb River
- Collins River
- Conway River
- Cook River / Weheka
- Copland River
- Cox River
- Crooked River
- Cropp River
- Crow River (Canterbury)
- Crow River (West Coast)
- Cust River

== D ==
- D'Urville River
- Dane River
- Dark River
- Dart River / Te Awa Whakatipu
- Dart River (Tasman)
- Deception River
- Deepdale River
- Devil River
- Dickson River
- Dillon River
- Dobson River
- Donald River (Hawke's Bay)
- Donald River (West Coast)
- Donne River
- Doon River
- Doubtful River
- Doubtless River
- Douglas River
- Dove River (Canterbury)
- Dove River (Tasman)
- Drake River
- Dry Awarua River
- Dry River (Tasman)
- Dry River (Wellington)
- Duncan River

== E ==
- Earnscleugh River
- Eastern Hohonu River
- Eastern Hutt River
- Eastern Waiotauru River
- Edison River
- Edith River
- Edwards River (Mid Canterbury)
- Edwards River (North Canterbury)
- Eglinton River
- Electric River
- Elizabeth River
- Ellis River
- Empson River
- Esk River (Canterbury)
- Esk River (Hawke's Bay)
- Esperance River
- Evans River
- Eyre River

== F ==
- Fairhall River
- Falls River
- Fish River
- Flaxbourne River
- Fleming River
- Forbes River
- Forgotten River
- Fork Stream
- Four Mile River
- Fox River (Buller)
- Fox River (Westland)
- Frances River
- Freshwater River
- Fyfe River

== G ==
- Garry River
- Gelt River
- George River
- Glaisnock River
- Glencoe River
- Glenrae River
- Glenroy River
- Glentui River
- Gloster River
- Godley River
- Goldney River
- Gorge River
- Goulter River
- Graham River
- Grantham River
- Gray River
- Grays River
- Grebe River
- Greenstone River
- Greenstone River / Hokonui
- Greta River
- Grey River / Māwheranui
- Guide River
- Gulliver River
- Gunn River
- Gunner River

== H ==
- Haast River
- Hacket River
- Hae Hae Te Moana River
- Hakaru River
- Hakataramea River
- Hall River
- Halswell River
- Hamilton River
- Hangaroa River
- Hangatahua (Stony) River, Taranaki
- Hanmer River
- Haparapara River
- Hapuawai River
- Hapuka River
- Hāpuku River
- Harman River
- Harper River
- Harrison River
- Hātea River
- Haumi River
- Haupiri River
- Hautapu River (Manawatū-Whanganui)
- Hautapu River (Wairoa District)
- Havelock River
- Hawai River
- Hawdon River
- Hāwea River
- Hawkins River
- Hay River
- Heaphy River
- Hector River
- Hemphill River
- Henry River
- Herekino River
- Heron River
- Hewson River
- Hikurangi River
- Hikurua River
- Hikutaia River
- Hikuwai River
- Hinatua River
- Hinds River
- Hinemaiaia River
- Hinemoatū / Howard River
- Hodder River
- Hokitika River
- Hollyford River / Whakatipu Kā Tuka
- Hook River
- Hooker River
- Hookhamsnyvy Creek
- Hope River (Canterbury)
- Hope River (Tasman)
- Hope River (West Coast)
- Hopkins River
- Horahora River
- Horomanga River
- Hororata River
- Hossack River
- Hōteo River
- Huangarua River
- Huia River
- Hunter River
- Huriwai River
- Hurunui River
- Hurunui River South Branch
- Huxley River

== I ==
- Ihungia River
- Ihuraua River
- Inangahua River
- Irene River
- Irwell River

== J ==
- Jackson River
- Jed River
- Jerry River
- Joe River
- Joes River
- John o'Groats River
- Johnson River
- Jollie River
- Jordan River
- Juno River

== K ==
- Kaeo River
- Kahurangi River
- Kahutara River
- Kaiapoi River
- Kaihu River
- Kaiikanui River
- Kaikou River
- Kaimarama River
- Kaipara River
- Kaipo River (Hawke's Bay)
- Kaipo River (Fiordland)
- Kaituna River (Bay of Plenty)
- Kaituna River (Canterbury)
- Kaituna River (Marlborough)
- Kaituna River (Tasman)
- Kaiwaka River
- Kaiwakawaka River
- Kaiwara River
- Kaiwharawhara Stream
- Kaiwhata River
- Kaka River
- Kakanui River
- Kakapo River
- Kākāpōtahi River / Little Waitaha River
- Kaniere River
- Kapowai River
- Karakatuwhero River
- Karamea River
- Karangarua River
- Karetu River (Canterbury)
- Karetu River (Northland)
- Karukaru River
- Katikara River
- Kauaeranga River
- Kaukapakapa River
- Kauru River
- Kawakawa River
- Kawarau River
- Kawhatau River
- Kedron River
- Kekerengu River
- Kenana River
- Kennet River
- Kereu River
- Kerikeri River (Northland)
- Kerikeri River (Waikato)
- Kitchener River
- Kiwi River
- Kohaihai River
- Kokatahi River
- Komata River
- Kopeka River
- Kopuapounamu River
- Kōpuaranga River
- Koranga River
- Korimako Stream
- Kowai River
- Kowhai River
- Kuaotunu River
- Kumengamatea River
- Kumeu River
- Kuratau River
- Kurow River

== L ==
- L II River
- Lambert River
- Landsborough River
- Lawrence River
- Leader River
- Leatham River
- Lee River (Canterbury)
- Lee River (Tasman)
- Leslie River
- Lewis River (Canterbury)
- Lewis River (West Coast)
- Light River
- Lilburne River
- Lindis River
- Little Akatarawa River
- Little Awakino River
- Little Boulder River
- Little Crow River
- Little Devil River
- Little Hohonu River
- Little Hope River
- Little Kowai River
- Little Lottery River
- Little Ōnahau River
- Little Opawa River
- Little Pokororo River
- Little Pomahaka River
- Little River
- Little Slate River
- Little Totara River
- Little Waingaro River
- Little Wanganui River
- Lochy River
- Lord River
- Lords River
- Lottery River
- Lud River
- Lyvia River

== M ==
- Macaulay River
- Macfarlane River
- Mackenzie River
- Maclennan River
- Maerewhenua River
- Mahakirau River
- Mahitahi River
- Mahurangi River
- Maitai River
- Makahu River
- Mākākahi River
- Makara River (Chatham Islands)
- Mākara River (Wellington)
- Makarau River
- Makaretu River
- Makarewa River
- Makarora River
- Makaroro River
- Makatote River
- Jacobs River
- Makerikeri River
- Makikihi River
- Makino River
- Makotuku River
- Makuri River
- Manaia River
- Manakaiaua River
- Manawapou River
- Manawatū River
- Mandamus River
- Mangaaruhe River
- Mangahao River
- Mangahauini River
- Mangaheia River
- Mangakahia River
- Mangakarengorengo River
- Mangakuri River
- Mangamaire River
- Mangamuka River
- Manganui River (Northland)
- Manganui River (Taranaki)
- Manganui River (Waikato)
- Manganuiohou River
- Manganuioteao River
- Mangaone River (Hawke's Bay)
- Mangaone River (Manawatū-Whanganui)
- Mangaoparo River
- Mangaorino River
- Mangaotaki River
- Mangapā River
- Mangapai River
- Mangapapa River (Bay of Plenty)
- Mangapapa River (Manawatū-Whanganui)
- Mangapehi River
- Mangapoike River
- Mangapu River
- Mangaroa River
- Mangatainoka River (Hawke's Bay)
- Mangatainoka River (Tararua District)
- Mangatāwhiri River
- Mangatera River
- Mangatete River
- Mangatewai River
- Mangatewainui River
- Mangatokerau River
- Mangatoro River
- Mangatū River
- Mangaturuturu River
- Mangawai River
- Mangawharariki River
- Mangawhero River
- Māngere River
- Mangles River
- Mangonuiowae River
- Mangorewa River
- Manuherikia River
- Maori River
- Maraehara River
- Maraekakaho River
- Maraetaha River
- Maraetotara River
- Mārahau River
- Maramarua River
- Maramataha River
- Mararoa River
- Marchburn River
- Marokopa River
- Maropea River
- Martyr River
- Maruia River
- Mason River
- Mata River
- Matahaka River
- Mataikona River
- Matakana River
- Matakitaki River
- Matakohe River
- Mataroa River
- Mataura River
- Mathias River
- Matiri River
- Matukituki River
- Maungakōtukutuku Stream
- Little Grey River
- McRae River
- Meola Creek
- Medina River
- Medway River
- Mike River
- Mikonui River
- Mimi River
- Miner River
- Mingha River
- Mistake River
- Misty River
- Moawhango River
- Moawhango West River
- Moeangiangi River
- Moeraki River
- Moerangi River
- Mohaka River
- Mōhakatino River
- Mokau River
- Mōkihinui River
- Mokomokonui River
- Mokoreta River
- Monowai River
- Montgomerie River
- Morgan River
- Morse River
- Motatapu River
- Mōtū River
- Motueka River
- Motukaika River
- Motunau River
- Motupiko River
- Motupipi River
- Motuti River
- Moutere River
- Mowbray River
- Mueller River
- Mungo River
- Murchison River
- Murray River

== N ==
- Namu River
- Nancy River
- Nevis River
- Newton River (Buller River tributary)
- Newton River (Fiordland)
- Newtown River
- New River / Kaimata
- Ngākawau River
- Ngaruroro River
- Ngatau River
- Ngatiawa River
- Ngāumuwahine River
- Ngunguru River
- Nina River
- Nokomai River
- North Barlow River
- North Mathias River
- North Ōhau River, Canterbury
- North Ōhau River, Wellington
- North Opuha River
- North River
- Nūhaka River
- Nukuhou River

== O ==
- Oakura River
- Ōamaru River
- Oaro River
- Ōhau River (Canterbury)
- Ōhau River (Manawatū-Whanganui)
- Ohikaiti River
- Ohikanui River
- Ōhinemahuta River
- Ohinemaka River
- Ohinemuri River
- Ohinetamatea River
- Ōhura River
- Ohuri River
- Okana River
- Okaramio River
- Okari River
- Ōkārito River
- Okuku River
- Okura River
- Okuru River
- Okuti River
- Old Bed Eyre River
- Old Bed of Waipawa River
- Olivine River
- Omaha River
- Omaka River
- Omanaia River
- Omanawa River
- Omaru River
- Omaumau River
- Ōmoeroa River
- Onaero River
- Ōnahau River
- Onekaka River
- Oneone River
- Ongarue River
- Onyx River (Ross Dependency)
- Ōpaoa River
- Ōpārara River
- Oparau River
- Opatu River
- Ōpāwaho / Heathcote River
- Ōpihi River
- Opitonui River
- Opotoru River
- Ōpouawe River
- Opouri River
- Opouteke River
- Opuha River
- Opuiaki River
- Ōpūrehu River
- Orangipuku River
- Orari River
- Orauea River
- Ōrere River
- Ōreti River
- Ōrewa River
- Orikaka River
- Orira River
- Ōrongorongo River
- Oroua River
- Orowaiti River
- Oruaiti River
- Oruawharo River
- Oruru River
- Orutua River
- Otahu River
- Otaio River
- Ōtaki River
- Otama River
- Otamatapaio River
- Otamatea River (Bay of Plenty)
- Otamatea River (Northland)
- Ōtara River
- Otaua River
- Otehake River
- Otekaieke River
- Otematata River
- Ōtere River
- Ōterei River
- Otiake River
- Ōtira River
- Ōtoko River
- Otorehinaiti River
- Otto River
- Otututu / Rough River
- Otūwhero River
- Ounuora River
- Ourauwhare River
- Ōwaka River
- Owen River

== P ==
- Pāhaoa River
- Pahau River
- Pahi River
- Pairatahi River
- Pakarae River
- Pakiri River
- Pakoka River
- Pakowhai River
- Pākuratahi River
- Pandora River
- Papakanui River
- Paranui River
- Parapara River
- Pareora River
- Paringa River
- Pariwhakaoho River
- Park River
- Pataua River
- Pātea River
- Paturau River
- Patutahi River
- Pearse River
- Pearson River
- Penk River
- Percival River
- Pēria River
- Perth River
- Perunui River
- Phantom River
- Piako River
- Pitt River
- Pleasant River
- Poerua River (Grey District)
- Poerua River (Westland District)
- Pohangina River
- Pohuenui River
- Pokororo River
- Pomahaka River
- Pongaroa River
- Pōrangahau River
- Poroporo River
- Pororari River
- Porter River
- Postal River
- Potts River
- Pouawa River
- Poulter River
- Pourakino River
- Pourangaki River
- Price River (New Zealand)
- Pūerua River
- Puhi Puhi River
- Puhoi River
- Pukaki River
- Pūkio Stream
- Punakaiki River
- Punakitere River
- Pungapunga River
- Puniu River
- Pupuke River
- Purakaunui River
- Purangi River
- Puremāhaia River
- Puriri River
- Pyke River

== R ==
- Racehorse River
- Rahu River
- Rai River
- Rainbow River
- Rainy River (Marlborough)
- Rainy River (Tasman)
- Rakaia River
- Rakeahua River
- Rangiora River
- Rangitaiki River
- Rangitane River
- Rangitata River
- Rangitīkei River
- Rappahannock River
- Raukokore River
- Rea River
- Red Pyke River
- Red River
- Rees River
- Reikorangi Stream
- Rerewhakaaitu River
- Retaruke River
- Ripia River
- Riuwaka River
- Roaring Lion River
- Robertson River
- Robinson River
- Rocky River
- Roding River
- Rogerson River
- Rolleston River
- Rolling River
- Ronga River
- Rooney River
- Rotokakahi River
- Rotokino River
- Rotowhenua River
- Ruakākā River
- Ruakituri River
- Ruakōkoputuna River
- Ruamāhanga River
- Rubicon River
- Ruera River
- Rum River
- Ryton River

== S ==
- Sabine River
- Saxon River
- Saxton River
- Seaforth River
- Seaward River
- Selwyn River / Waikirikiri
- Serpentine River
- Severn River
- Shag River (Fiordland)
- Shenandoah River
- Sheriff River/Station Creek
- Sherry River
- Shin River
- Shotover River
- Sinclair River
- Skeet River
- Slate River
- Smite River
- Smoothwater River
- Smyth River
- Snow River
- Snowy River
- South Mathias River
- South Ohau River, Canterbury
- South Ohau River, Wellington
- South Opuha River
- Southern Waiotauru River
- Spey River (Southland)
- Spey River (Tasman)
- Spoon River
- Spray River
- Stafford River
- Stanley River (Canterbury)
- Stanley River (Tasman)
- Stanton River
- Stillwater River
- Stony River
- Stour River
- Strauchon River
- Styx Creek
- Styx River (Canterbury)
- Styx River (North Canterbury)
- Styx River (West Coast)
- Swift River
- Swin Burn
- Swin River

== T ==
- Tadmor River
- Tahaenui River
- Tahakopa River
- Taharua River
- Taheke River
- Tahekeroa River
- Tahoranui River
- Taieri River
- Taiharuru River
- Taihiki River
- Taipā River
- Taipō River (Buller District)
- Taipo River (Westland District)
- Taipoiti River
- Tairua River
- Takahue River
- Tākaka River
- Takaputahi River
- Takiritawai River
- Takou River
- Talbot River
- Tāmaki River
- Tamaki River (Manawatū-Whanganui)
- Tangahoe River
- Tāngarākau River
- Tapu River
- Tapuaeroa River
- Tapuwae River
- Taramakau River
- Tarawera River
- Taringamotu River
- Taruarau River
- Taruheru River
- Tasman River
- Tass River
- Tauanui River
- Tauherenikau River
- Tauhoa River
- Taumona River
- Tauranga River
- Tauranga Taupō River
- Taurangakautuku River
- Tauraroa River
- Tautuku River
- Tauweru River
- Tawapuku River
- Tawarau River
- Tawatahi River
- Taylor River
- Te Arai River
- Te Awa Kairangi / Hutt River
- Te Hoe River
- Te Hoiere / Pelorus River
- Te Kapa River
- Te Kauparenui / Gowan River
- Te Mata River
- Te Naihi River
- Te Putaaraukai River
- Te Rahotaiepa River
- Te Wai-o-Pareira / Henderson Creek
- Te Wharau River
- Teal River
- Tekapo River
- Teme River
- Temuka River
- Tengawai River
- Teviot River
- Thomas River (Canterbury)
- Thomas River (West Coast)
- Thurso River
- Tīmaru River
- Tinline River
- Tīnui River
- Tiraumea River (Manawatū-Whanganui)
- Tiraumea River (Tasman)
- Toaroha River
- Tohoratea River
- Toitoi River
- Tokanui River
- Tokomairaro River
- Tokomaru River
- Tolson River
- Tone River
- Tongapōrutu River
- Tongariro River
- Topuni River
- Tōrere River
- Torrent River
- Tōtara River (Buller District)
- Tōtara River (Westland District)
- Totarakaitorea River
- Townshend River
- Towy River
- Transit River
- Travers River
- Trent River
- Troyte River
- Tuamarina River
- Tuapeka River
- Tuke River
- Tukipo River
- Tukituki River
- Tummil River
- Tunakino River
- Turakina River
- Tūranganui River (Gisborne)
- Tūranganui River (Wellington)
- Turimawiwi River
- Turnbull River
- Tūtaekurī River (Hastings District)
- Tūtaekurī River (Wairoa District)
- Tūtaekurī River (West Coast)
- Tutaki River
- Tūtoko River
- Tweed River
- Twizel River

== U ==
- Uawa River
- Ugly River
- Upper Grey River
- Upukerora River
- Urenui River
- Utakura River

== V ==
- Victoria River
- Von River

== W ==
- Wahianoa River
- Wai-iti River
- Waianakarua River
- Waianiwaniwa River
- Waiapu River
- Waiariki River
- Waiaruhe River
- Waiatoto River
- Waiau River (Gisborne)
- Waiau River (Hawke's Bay)
- Waiau River (Southland)
- Waiau Toa / Clarence River
- Waiaua River (Bay of Plenty)
- Waiaua River (Taranaki)
- Waiau Uwha River
- Waihāhā River
- Waihao River
- Waiheke River
- Waihemo / Shag River
- Waihi River
- Waiho River
- Waihoihoi River
- Waihopai River (Marlborough)
- Waihopai River (Southland)
- Waihora River
- Waihou River
- Waihua River
- Waihuka River
- Waikaia River
- Waikākaho River
- Waikakariki River
- Waikamaka River
- Waikanae River
- Waikare River (Bay of Plenty)
- Waikare River (Northland)
- Waikaretāheke River
- Waikari River (Canterbury)
- Waikari River (Hawke's Bay)
- Waikato River
- Waikawa River
- Waikawau River (Thames-Coromandel District)
- Waikawau River (Waitomo District)
- Waikiti River
- Waikoau River
- Waikohu River
- Waikoropupu River
- Waikorure River
- Waikouaiti River
- Waikukupa River
- Waikura River (Raukokore River tributary)
- Waikura River (Hangaroa River tributary)
- Waima River
- Waimakariri River
- Waimamakau River
- Waimamaku River
- Waimana River
- Waimangarara River
- Waimangaroa River
- Waimarino River
- Waimata River
- Waimea River (Southland)
- Waimea River (Tasman)
- Waimeamea River
- Waingaro River (Tasman)
- Waingaro River (Waikato)
- Waingaromia River
- Waingawa River
- Waingongoro River
- Wainui River (Bay of Plenty)
- Wainui River (Manawatū-Whanganui)
- Wainui River (Northland)
- Wainui River (Tasman)
- Wainuiomata River
- Wainuiora River
- Wainuioru River
- Waioeka River
- Waiohine River
- Waiomoko River
- Waionepu River
- Waiorongomai River (Gisborne)
- Waiorongomai River (Wellington)
- Waiotahe River
- Waiotaka River
- Waiotama River
- Waiotauru River
- Waiotu River
- Waipā River
- Waipahi River
- Waipakihi River
- Waipaoa River
- Waipapa River (Bay of Plenty)
- Waipapa River (Northland)
- Waipapa River (Waikato)
- Waipati (Chaslands) River
- Waipara River (Canterbury)
- Waipara River (West Coast)
- Waipekakoura River
- Waipori River
- Waipoua River (Northland)
- Waipoua River (Wellington)
- Waipu River
- Waipunga River
- Wairahi River
- Wairakei River
- Wairaki River
- Wairau River
- Wairaurāhiri River
- Waireia River
- Wairere River
- Wairoa River (Auckland)
- Wairoa River (Bay of Plenty)
- Wairoa River (Hawke's Bay)
- Wairoa River (Northland)
- Wairoa River (Tasman)
- Wairongomai River
- Wairua River
- Waita River
- Waitaha River
- Waitahaia River
- Waitahanui River
- Waitahu River
- Waitāhuna River
- Waitakaruru River
- Waitakere (Nile) River
- Waitākere River
- Waitaki River
- Waitangi River (Far North District)
- Waitangi River (Whangarei District)
- Waitangiroto River
- Waitangitāhuna River
- Waitara River
- Waitatapia Stream
- Waitati River
- Waitawheta River
- Waitekauri River
- Waitekuri River
- Waitepeka River
- Waitetuna River
- Waitewaewae River
- Waitoa River
- Waitoetoe River
- Waitohi River
- Waitōtara River
- Waitutu River
- Waiuku River
- Waiwawa River
- Waiwera River (Auckland)
- Waiwera River (Otago)
- Waiwhakaiho River
- Waiwhango River
- Waiwhetū Stream
- Wakamarina River
- Wakapuaka River
- Walker River
- Wandle River
- Wanganui River
- Wangapeka River
- Wapiti River
- Warwick River
- Water of Leith
- Weiti River
- Wentworth River
- West Mathias River
- Western Hutt River
- Whakaikai River
- Whakaki River
- Whakanekeneke River
- Whakapapa River
- Whakapara River
- Whakapohai River
- Whakarapa River
- Whakatahine River
- Whakataki River
- Whakatāne River
- Whakatīkei River
- Whakaurekou River
- Whanaki River
- Whāngae River
- Whangaehu River
- Whangamarino River
- Whangamaroro River
- Whangamoa River
- Whangamōmona River
- Whanganui River
- Whangaparāoa River
- Whareama River
- Whareatea River
- Wharehine River
- Wharekahika River
- Wharekawa River
- Wharekōpae River
- Wharemauku Stream
- Wharepapa River
- Whataroa River
- Whau River
- Whawanui River
- Wheao River
- Whenuakite River
- Whenuakura River
- Whirinaki River (Hawke's Bay)
- Whirinaki River (Northland)
- Whistler River
- Whitbourn River
- Whitcombe River
- White River
- White Rock River
- Whitestone River
- Whitewater River
- Wilberforce River
- Wild Natives River
- Wilkin River
- Wilkinson River
- Willberg River
- Williamson River
- Wills River
- Wilmot River
- Wilson River
- Windley River
- Windward River
- Winterton River
- Wolff River
- Woolley River
- Worsley Stream
- Wye River

== Y ==
- Yankee River
- Yarra River
- Young River

== See also ==
- List of rivers of New Zealand by length
- List of rivers
- List of rivers of Oceania
- List of islands of New Zealand#In rivers and lakes
- List of lakes in New Zealand
- List of rivers of Wellington Region
