= Tokanui =

Tokanui may refer to the following in New Zealand:

== In Southland ==
- Tokanui, Southland, a locality
- Tokanui Branch, a former branch line railway
- Tokanui River, a river flowing into Toetoes Bay

== In Waikato ==
- Tokanui, Waikato, a locality
- Tokanui Psychiatric Hospital, a former psychiatric hospital
