= Kaimarama River =

Coordinates: 36.861308°S 175.646773°E

Location
- Country: New Zealand

Physical characteristics
- Length: 15 km (9.3 mi)

The Kaimarama River is a river of New Zealand's Coromandel Peninsula. It flows from its source within Coromandel Forest Park, joining with the Mahakirau River to flow into Whitianga Harbour on the peninsula's east coast.

== See also ==
- List of rivers of New Zealand
