= Racehorse (disambiguation) =

A racehorse is a horse involved in horse racing.

Racehorse or variations may also refer to:

- Racehorse River, a river in New Zealand
- Race Horse, an 1850 ship
- Race Horses, a Welsh band

== See also ==
- Racecourse Ground, football stadium in Wrexham, Wales, sometimes misnamed as "Racehorse Ground"
