= Kumengamatea River =

Coordinates: 36°08′S 174°06′E

Location
- Country: New Zealand

Physical characteristics
- Mouth
  - location: Awaroa River

The Kumengamatea River is a river of the Northland Region of New Zealand's North Island. It flows southwest into the Awaroa River close to the latter's outflow into the Wairoa River.

== See also ==
- List of rivers of New Zealand
