= Waipati River =

Coordinates: 46°37′S 169°20′E

Waipati (Chaslands) River

Location
- Country: New Zealand

Physical characteristics
- Source
  - elevation: 490 metres (1,610 ft)
- Mouth
  - location: South Pacific Ocean
  - elevation: 0 metres (0 ft)

The Waipati River, alternatively known as the Chaslands River is a river in the eastern Catlins, New Zealand. It rises in the Maclennan Range and flows south-eastward into the Waipati Beach north of Chaslands Mistake.

== See also ==
- List of rivers of New Zealand
