= Waimangarara River =

Coordinates: 42°21′S 173°40′E

Location
- Country: New Zealand

Physical characteristics
- Source
  - location: Seaward Kaikōura Range
- Mouth
  - location: Pacific Ocean
- Length: 10 km (6 mi)

The Waimangarara River is a river of the Canterbury Region of New Zealand's South Island. It flows generally south from its origins in the Seaward Kaikōura Range to reach the Pacific Ocean 5 kilometres (3 mi) north of Kaikōura.

== See also ==
- List of rivers of New Zealand
