= Te Rahotaiepa River =

River in New Zealand

Coordinates: 43°01′S 170°34′E

Location
- Country: New Zealand

Physical characteristics
- Mouth
  - location: Waitaha River
- Length: 15 km (9.3 mi)

The Te Rahotaiepa River is a river of the West Coast Region of New Zealand's South Island. It rises to the north of Lake Ianthe and flows parallel with the Tasman Sea coast along the edge of marshy ground for several kilometres to flow into the mouth of the Waitaha River.

== See also ==
- List of rivers of New Zealand
