= Transit River =

River in New Zealand

- Route of the Transit River
- Mouth of the Transit River Transit River (South Island)

Location
- Country: New Zealand

Physical characteristics
- Source
  - coordinates: 44°40′53″S 167°46′18″E
- Mouth
  - location: Tasman Sea
  - coordinates: 44°35′32″S 167°44′49″E
  - elevation: 0 m (0 ft)

Basin features
- Progression: Transit River → Tasman Sea

The Transit River is a river in New Zealand southwest of Milford Sound, which flows into the Tasman Sea near Transit Beach.

== See also ==
- List of rivers of New Zealand
