= Waiotaka River =

Coordinates: 38°57′S 175°50′E

Location
- Country: New Zealand

Physical characteristics
- Source
  - location: Kaimanawa Range
- Mouth
  - location: Lake Taupō
- Length: 24 km (15 mi)

The Waiotaka River is a river of the Waikato Region of New Zealand's North Island. It flows northwest from its origins in the Kaimanawa Range to reach the southern shore of Lake Taupō 5 kilometres (3 mi) northeast of Tūrangi.

== See also ==
- List of rivers of New Zealand
