= Wairahi River =

River in the Auckland Region, New Zealand

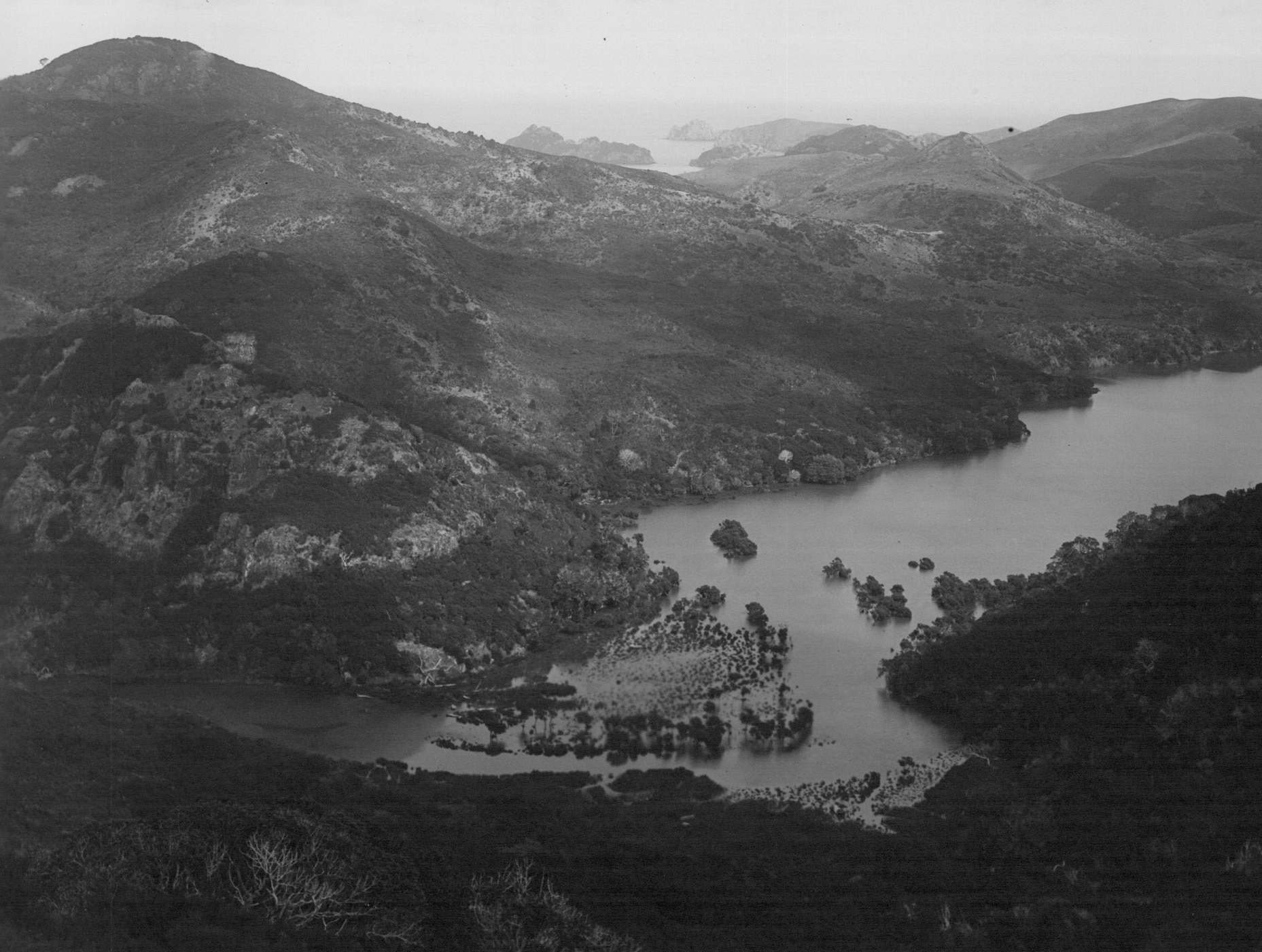
- Head of the Wairahi River in 1908

- Mouth of the Wairahi River Wairahi River (New Zealand)
- Route of the Wairahi River

Location
- Country: New Zealand
- Region: Auckland Region

Physical characteristics
- Source
  - coordinates: 36.2047°S 175.3939°E
- Mouth: Wairahi Bay
  - coordinates: 36.21584°S 175.34823°E
- Length: 7 km (4 mi)

Basin features
- Progression: Wairahi River → Wairahi Bay → Port Fitzroy → Hauraki Gulf → Pacific Ocean

The Wairahi River is a river of New Zealand's Great Barrier Island. It is the only river (so named) on the island — the island's other watercourses all having names ending is "stream". The Wairahi flows generally west, roughly paralleling the island's long southwestern shore, from its origins north of Whangaparapara Harbour. A walking track from Whangaparapara to Port Fitzroy follows the river for part of its length.

== See also ==
- List of rivers of New Zealand
