= Mangahauini River =

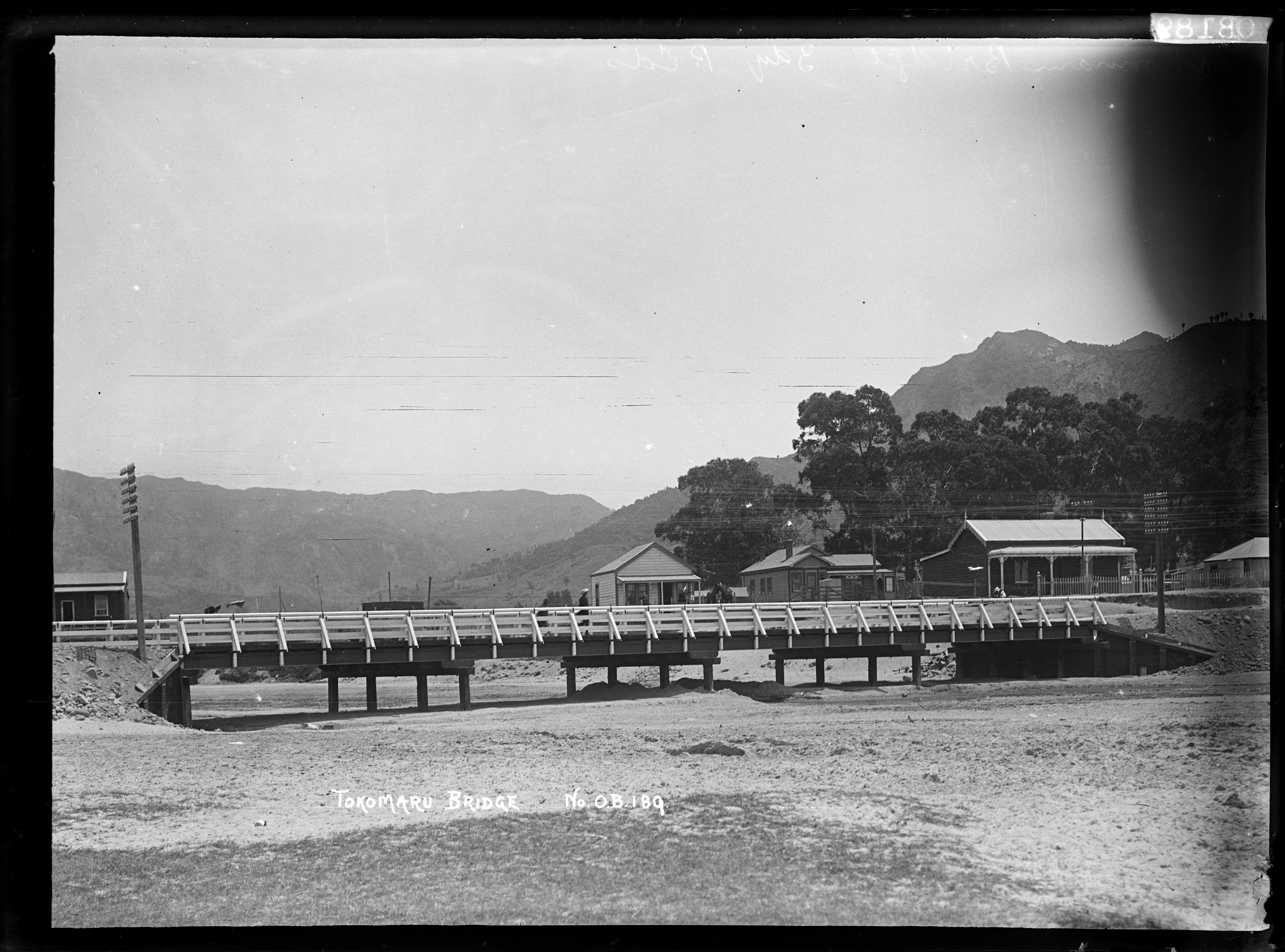
- Bridge at Tokomaru Bay in early 1900s
- Route of the Mangahauini River
- Mouth of the Mangahauini River Mangahauini River (North Island)

Location
- Country: New Zealand
- Island: North Island
- Region: Gisborne

Physical characteristics
- Source: Confluence of Ōtoto Stream and Te Matai Stream
  - coordinates: 38.0832°S 178.2965°E
- Mouth: Tokomaru Bay
  - coordinates: 38°07′40″S 178°19′04″E

Basin features
- Progression: Mangahauini River → Tokomaru Bay → Pacific Ocean
- Tributaries
  - left: Mākahikātoa Stream, Korokoro Stream, Mangatītī Stream, Mākarangū Stream
  - right: Pīpiko Stream, Kōpae Stream, Mangamauku Stream, Kākahu Stream, Wairua Stream, Umukurī Stream
- Bridges: Mangahauini River Bridge No. 1, Mangahauini River Bridge No. 2, Mangahauini River Bridge No. 3

The Mangahauini River is a river of the Gisborne Region of New Zealand's North Island. It flows generally south from its origins southwest of Te Puia Springs, reaching the Pacific Ocean close to the settlement of Tokomaru Bay.

== History ==
Major floods occurred in 1916, 1924, 1950, 1963 and the 2022 flood washed away part of the State Highway 35 bridge at Tokomaru Bay, which was last rebuilt in 1966. The new bridge is downstream from its predecessor. The main road runs through the valley for several kilometres, crossing the river three times.

== See also ==
- List of rivers of New Zealand
