= Makuri River =

Coordinates: 40°29′S 175°55′E

Location
- Country: New Zealand

Physical characteristics
- Mouth
  - location: Tiraumea River
- Length: 28 km (17 mi)

The Makuri River is a river in the south of New Zealand's North Island. It flows from the Puketoi Range in the northern Wairarapa, initially flowing southwest (this stretch is usually known as Makuri Stream). After some 15 kilometres (9 mi), it turns northwest, reaching the waters of the Tiraumea River 5 kilometres (3 mi) southeast of Pahiatua.

== See also ==
- List of rivers of New Zealand
