= Smoothwater River =

River of New Zealand's South Island

Coordinates: 43.975430°S 168.594131°E

Location
- Country: New Zealand

Physical characteristics
- Source
  - location: Stafford Range
- Mouth
  - location: Tasman Sea
- Length: 8 km (5.0 mi)

The Smoothwater River is a river of the West Coast Region of New Zealand's South Island. It flows north to reach the Tasman Sea three kilometres west of the western end of Jackson Bay.

== See also ==
- List of rivers of New Zealand
