= Waikiti River =

Coordinates: 42°34′S 171°53′E

Location
- Country: New Zealand

Physical characteristics
- Mouth
  - location: Ahaura River
- Length: 17 km (11 mi)

The Waikiti River is a river of the West Coast Region of New Zealand's South Island. It flows generally north from it sources in the eastern Kaimata Range, roughly paralleling the course of its larger eastern neighbour, the Trent River. It reaches the Ahaura River 20 kilometres southeast of Lake Hochstetter.

== See also ==
- List of rivers of New Zealand
