= Ohuri River =

Coordinates: 35°27′S 173°33′E

Location
- Country: New Zealand

Physical characteristics
- Mouth
  - location: Waima River

The Ohuri River is a river of the Northland Region of New Zealand. It flows north to reach the Waima River five kilometres southeast of Rawene.

== See also ==
- List of rivers of New Zealand
