= Totarakaitorea River =

River in New Zealand

- Route of the Totarakaitorea River
- Mouth of the Totarakaitorea River Totarakaitorea River (New Zealand)

Location
- Country: New Zealand
- Region: West Coast
- District: Westland

Physical characteristics
- Source: Strauchon Glacier
  - coordinates: 43.2523°S 170.1695°E
- Mouth: Three Mile Lagoon
  - coordinates: 43°14′26″S 170°08′11″E
- Length: 4 km (2.5 mi)

Basin features
- Progression: Totarakaitorea River → Three Mile Lagoon → Tasman Sea

The Totarakaitorea River is a short river of the West Coast Region of New Zealand's South Island. It flows west to reach the Three Mile Lagoon three kilometres (1.9 mi) to the south of Ōkārito.

== See also ==
- List of rivers of New Zealand
