= Heron River =

Coordinates: 47°03′S 168°10′E

Location
- Country: New Zealand

The Heron River is a river of Stewart Island / Rakiura, New Zealand. It rises north of Adventure Hill and flows south-eastward into Port Adventure.

== See also ==
- List of rivers of New Zealand
