= Waitepeka River =

Coordinates: 46°20′S 169°46′E

Location
- Country: New Zealand

The Waitepeka River is a river in New Zealand. A tributary of the Clutha River, it flows into that river near Port Molyneux.

== See also ==
- List of rivers of New Zealand
