= Goulter River =

Coordinates: 41°39′S 173°13′E

Location
- Country: New Zealand

Physical characteristics
- Source
  - location: Richmond Range
- Mouth
  - location: Wairau River

The Goulter River is a river in the Marlborough region of New Zealand. It rises in the Richmond Range near Lake Chalice. The lake was formed by a landslip about 2,000 years ago, which dammed the river. The lake has no outlet, but water seeps through the landslip rubble into the Goulter. The river flows counter-clockwise around Mount Patriarch to join the Wairau River.

The river was visited by Cyrus Goulter, Joseph Ward and Harry Redwood in 1857. Goulter later became Speaker of the Marlborough District Council.

The river runs through native bush and contains trout suitable for fishing. A walkway runs the length of the river.

== See also ==
- List of rivers of New Zealand
