= Woolley River =

Location
- Country: New Zealand
- Region: West Coast
- District: Buller

Physical characteristics
- Source: Ivess Peak
  - location: Victoria Range
  - coordinates: 42°12′25″S 172°7′41″E
- Mouth: Maruia River
  - coordinates: 42°11′42″S 172°13′12″E
- Length: 15 kilometres (9 mi)

Basin features
- Progression: Woolley River → Maruia River → Buller River
- River system: Buller River

The Woolley River is a river of the West Coast Region of New Zealand's South Island. It initially flows east before turning north to reach the Maruia River close to the settlement of Maruia.

== See also ==
- List of rivers of New Zealand
