= Phantom River =

River in New Zealand

Coordinates: 43°51′S 171°03′E

Location
- Country: New Zealand

Physical characteristics
- Source
  - location: Ben McLeod Range
- Mouth
  - location: Orari River
- Length: 22 km (14 mi)

The Phantom River is a river of the Canterbury region of New Zealand's South Island. It flows predominantly east from the ben McLeod Range north of Fairlie to reach the Orari River 20 kilometres (12 mi) northwest of Peel Forest.

== See also ==
- List of rivers of New Zealand
