= Urenui River =

Coordinates: 38°59′S 174°23′E

Location
- Country: New Zealand

Physical characteristics
- Mouth
  - location: North Taranaki Bight
- Length: 27 km (17 mi)

The Urenui River is a river of the Taranaki Region of New Zealand's North Island. It flows northeast before turning northwest to reach the coast at Urenui.

== See also ==
- List of rivers of New Zealand
