= Waipahi River =

Location
- Country: New Zealand

Physical characteristics
- Mouth
  - coordinates: 46°04′51″S 169°14′37″E

The Waipahi River is a river in New Zealand, a tributary of the Pomahaka River.

== See also ==
- List of rivers of New Zealand
