= Motukaika River =

Coordinates: 44°23′S 171°00′E

Location
- Country: New Zealand

Physical characteristics
- Mouth
  - location: Pareora River
- Length: 9 km (5.6 mi)

The Motukaika River is a river in the south Canterbury region of New Zealand's South Island. It flows generally east, reaching the Pareora River at the small settlement of Motukaika, 18 kilometres (11 mi) west of Timaru.

== See also ==
- List of rivers of New Zealand
