= Pakarae River =

- Route of the Pakarae River
- Mouth of the Pakarae River Pakarae River (North Island)
- Native name: Pakarae (Māori)

Location
- Country: New Zealand
- Island: North Island
- Region: Gisborne

Physical characteristics
- Source: Confluence of Whakaauranga Stream and Kākānui Stream
  - coordinates: 38.36763°S 178.13050°E
- Mouth: Pacific Ocean
  - coordinates: 38°33′09″S 178°14′54″E
- Length: 48 km (30 mi)

Basin features
- Progression: Pakarae River → Pacific Ocean
- Tributaries
  - left: Mangataueru Stream, Maikuku Stream, Te Hue Stream, Mangarewa Stream, Mākaramea Stream, Kākānui Stream, Rorokuika Stream, Tariri Stream, Mangapapa Stream, Makatote Stream, Mākōkako Stream
  - right: Mākahakaha Stream, Mangamohoao Stream, Mangarara Stream, Uenuku Stream, Mangapapa Stream, Waitapaua Stream, Mangakurī Stream
- Bridges: Parakae River Bridge (2890)

The Pakarae River is a river of the Gisborne Region of New Zealand's North Island. It flows a convoluted generally southeastern course from its sources 20 kilometres (12 mi) inland from Tolaga Bay, reaching the Pacific Ocean 25 kilometres (16 mi) northeast of Gisborne.

== See also ==
- List of rivers of New Zealand
