= Towy River =

Coordinates: 42°27′S 173°16′E

Location
- Country: New Zealand

Physical characteristics
- Source
  - location: Amuri Range
- Mouth
  - location: Charwell River
- Length: 13 km (8.1 mi)

The Towy River is a river of the north Canterbury region of New Zealand's South Island. It flows generally east from its origins in the Amuri Range to reach the Conway River 29 kilometres (18 mi) northeast of Waiau.

== See also ==
- List of rivers of New Zealand
