= Māngere River =

Coordinates: 35°42′S 174°07′E

Location
- Country: New Zealand

Physical characteristics
- Mouth
  - location: Wairua River
- Length: 12 km (7.5 mi)

The Māngere River is a river of the Northland Region of New Zealand's North Island. It flows generally westwards from its sources in hills northwest of Whangārei, meeting the Wairua River 10 kilometres (6 mi) northwest of Maungatapere.

At the annual New Zealand River Awards in 2014, it was awarded "Most Improved."

== See also ==
- List of rivers of New Zealand
