= Waikōrure River =

River in the Hawke's Bay Region, New Zealand

- Route of Waikōrure River
- Mouth of Waikōrure River Waikōrure River (North Island)

Location
- Country: New Zealand
- Island: North Island
- Region: Hawke's Bay
- District: Hastings

Physical characteristics
- Source
  - coordinates: 39.7411°S 176.60928°E
- Mouth: Paritua Stream
  - coordinates: 39°39′55″S 176°41′10″E

Basin features
- Progression: Waikōrure River → Paritua Stream → Karewarewa Stream → Awanui Stream → Karamū Stream → Te Awa o Mokotūāraro → Waitangi Estuary → Hawke Bay → Pacific Ocean
- Tributaries
  - right: Mangarotai Stream
- Bridges: Raukawa Road Bridge, Rays Road Bridge, Valley Road Bridge

The Waikōrure River is a river of the Hawke's Bay region of New Zealand's North Island. It flows through undulating hill country to the Heretaunga Plains near Hastings.

== See also ==
- List of rivers of New Zealand
