= Glencoe River =

Coordinates: 42°45′9″S 172°33′9″E

- Location of the mouth within New Zealand

Location
- Country: New Zealand

Physical characteristics
- Source
  - location: Organ Range
- Mouth
  - location: Mandamus River

The Glencoe River is a river in the Canterbury region of New Zealand. It arises in the Organ Range near Shale Peak and flows south into the Mandamus River.

== See also ==
- List of rivers of New Zealand
