= Hacket River =

River in New Zealand

- Route of the Hacket River
- Mouth of the Hacket River Hacket River (South Island) Hacket River (New Zealand)

Location
- Country: New Zealand
- Region: West Coast Region
- District: Westland

Physical characteristics
- Source: McKenzie Range
  - coordinates: 44.2561°S 168.225°E
- Mouth
  - location: Tasman Sea
  - coordinates: 44°14′42″S 168°05′51″E

Basin features
- Progression: Hacket River → Tasman Sea

The Hacket River is a river on the West Coast of New Zealand. It starts in the McKenzie Range and flows north-west into the Tasman Sea.

== See also ==
- List of rivers of New Zealand
