= Wairongomai River =

Coordinates: 39°12′S 173°48′E

Location
- Country: New Zealand

Physical characteristics
- Source
  - location: Mount Taranaki
- Mouth
  - location: North Taranaki Bight

The Wairongomai River or Wairongomai Stream is a river of the Taranaki Region of New Zealand's North Island. It is one of many small rivers and streams that radiate from the cone of Mount Taranaki, and reaches the North Taranaki Bight to the west of Ōkato.

== See also ==
- List of rivers of New Zealand
