= Waimeamea River =

Coordinates: 46°16′S 167°44′E

Location
- Country: New Zealand

The Waimeamea River is a river in the Southland Region of New Zealand. It rises in the Longwood Range and flows south-eastward into Te Waewae Bay north of Orepuki.

== See also ==
- List of rivers of New Zealand
