= Morgan River =

Coordinates: 42°40′S 171°38′E

Location
- Country: New Zealand

Physical characteristics
- Source
  - location: Lake Morgan
- Mouth
  - location: Crooked River
- Length: 9 km (5.6 mi)

The Morgan River is a river of the West Coast Region of New Zealand's South Island. It flows generally west from the small Lake Morgan, high in the Kaimata Range of the Southern Alps, reaching the Crooked River 18 kilometres (11 mi) from the latter's outflow into Lake Brunner.

== See also ==
- List of rivers of New Zealand
