= Toitoi River =

Coordinates: 47°07′S 167°59′E

Location
- Country: New Zealand

The Toitoi River is a river in Stewart Island / Rakiura, New Zealand.

== See also ==
- List of rivers of New Zealand
