= John o'Groats River =

River in New Zealand

- Route of John o'Groats River
- Mouth of John o'Groats River John o'Groats River (South Island)

Location
- Country: New Zealand

Physical characteristics
- Source: Ongaruanuku
  - coordinates: 44°32′00″S 167°57′48″E
- Mouth
  - location: Tasman Sea
  - coordinates: 44°30′57″S 167°49′44″E
  - elevation: 0 m (0 ft)

Basin features
- Progression: John o'Groats River → Tasman Sea

The John o'Groats River is a river in northern Fiordland, New Zealand. It flows west to the Tasman Sea north of Milford Sound.

== See also ==
- List of rivers of New Zealand
