= Otekaieke River =

Coordinates: 44°49′S 170°35′E

Location
- Country: New Zealand

The Otekaieke River is a river in New Zealand, a tributary of the Waitaki River.

== See also ==
- List of rivers of New Zealand
