= Brown Grey River =

Coordinates: 42.376216°S 172.129249°E

Location
- Country: New Zealand

Physical characteristics
- Source
  - location: Mount Kemp
- Mouth
  - location: Grey River
- Length: 10 km (6.2 mi)

The Brown Grey River is a river of New Zealand. It is an upper tributary of the Grey River, flowing from the slopes of Mount Kemp, close to the township of Springs Junction, and flowing southeast for 10 kilometres (6 mi) before reaching the upper Grey River.

== See also ==
- List of rivers of New Zealand
