= Huriwai River =

Coordinates: 37°27′S 174°42′E

Location
- Country: New Zealand

Physical characteristics
- Source
  - elevation: 354 m (1,161 ft)
- Mouth
  - elevation: 0m
- Length: 9 km (5.6 mi)

The Huriwai River is a river of about 9 km (5.6 mi) in New Zealand's North Island. It rises in rough hill country to the southeast of Port Waikato, flowing west to reach the Tasman Sea 5 kilometres (3 mi) south of the mouth of the Waikato River. The main tributary is the Mangapai Stream.

The river has a waterfall in its upper reach, at the boundary of sandstone and conglomerate rocks. Just north of the river's estuary, the Jurassic rocks have been described by the Geological Society as containing, "amazing fossil leaves and ferns".

At the point where the river is crossed by Waikaretu Road, its water quality is in the lower 50% for macroinvertebrates.

== See also ==
- List of rivers of New Zealand
