= Mangapā River =

Coordinates: 35°14′08″S 173°41′17″E

Location
- Country: New Zealand

Physical characteristics
- Mouth
  - location: Waipapa River
- Length: 10 km (6.2 mi)

The Mangapā River is a river of the far north of New Zealand's North Island. It flows south from its sources in the Omahuta Forest to reach the Waipapa River 25 kilometres (16 mi) west of Kerikeri.

In 2026, the spelling of the river's name was officially altered from Mangapa to Mangapā.

== See also ==
- List of rivers of New Zealand
