= Old Bed Eyre River =

Coordinates: 43°24′S 172°32′E

Location
- Country: New Zealand

Physical characteristics
- Mouth
  - location: Eyre River

The Old Bed Eyre River is a river of the Canterbury region of New Zealand's South Island. It lies to the south of the Eyre River, into which it flows near Kaiapoi.

== See also ==
- List of rivers of New Zealand
