= Tīmaru River =

Coordinates: 44°33′S 169°18′E

Location
- Country: New Zealand

Physical characteristics
- Mouth
  - location: Lake Hāwea

The Tīmaru River is a river of the Otago region of New Zealand's South Island. It initially flows southwest before turning west to flow into the eastern shore of Lake Hāwea, 10 kilometres (6 mi) northeast of Lake Hāwea township.

== See also ==
- List of rivers of New Zealand
