= Ryton River =

Coordinates: 43°18′S 171°31′E

Location
- Country: New Zealand

Physical characteristics
- Source
  - location: Craigieburn Range
- Mouth
  - location: Lake Coleridge
- Length: 16 km (9.9 mi)

The Ryton River is a river of the Canterbury region of New Zealand's South Island. It flows southwest down a long valley within the Craigieburn Range to reach the northeastern shore of Lake Coleridge.

== See also ==
- List of rivers of New Zealand
