= Whangamaroro River =

Coordinates: 36°51′S 175°40′E

Location
- Country: New Zealand

Physical characteristics
- Mouth
  - location: Whitianga Harbour

The Whangamaroro River is a short river of the Coromandel Peninsula, in the Waikato Region of New Zealand's North Island. It flows east to reach a northwestern arm of Whitianga Harbour

== See also ==
- List of rivers of New Zealand
