= Tohoratea River =

River in New Zealand

- Route of the Tohoratea River
- Mouth of the Tohoratea River Tohoratea River (North Island)

Location
- Country: New Zealand
- Island: North Island
- District: Gisborne
- Ward: Waiapu Ward

Physical characteristics
- Source
  - coordinates: 37.94159°S 178.34634°E
- Mouth: Pacific Ocean
  - location: Tūpāroa
  - coordinates: 37°55′08″S 178°23′13″E

Basin features
- Progression: Tohoratea River → Pacific Ocean
- Tributaries
  - left: Mangatarau Stream

The Tohoratea River is a short river of the Gisborne District of New Zealand's North Island. It flows southeast from its origins south of Ruatoria to reach the Pacific Ocean to the north of Waipiro Bay.

== See also ==
- List of rivers of New Zealand
