= Seaward River =

Coordinates: 42°51′S 172°22′E

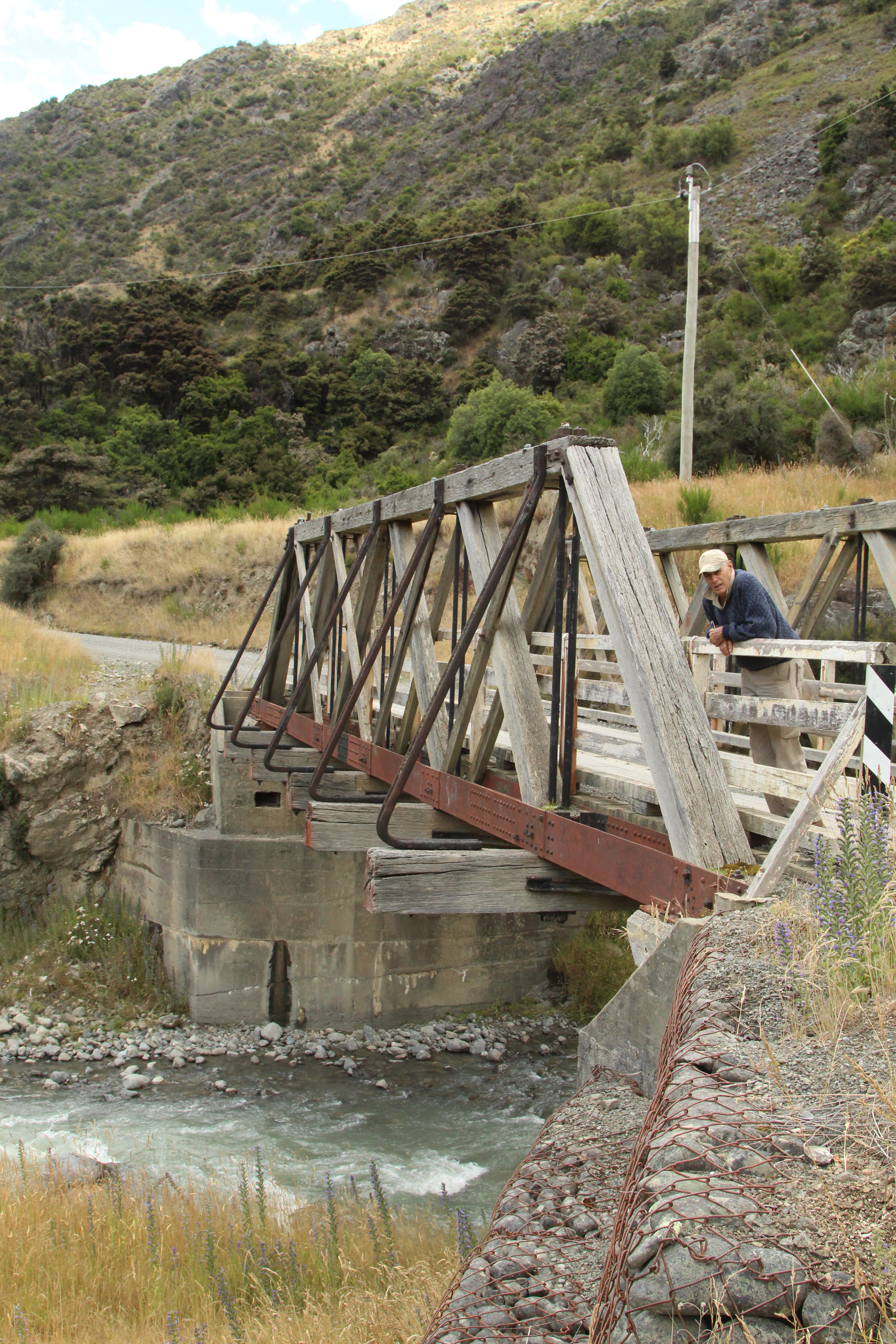
- heritage-registered truss bridge over the Seaward River on Lake Sumner Road

Location
- Country: New Zealand

Physical characteristics
- Source
  - location: Puketeraki Range
- Mouth
  - location: Hurunui River
- Length: 15 km (9.3 mi)

The Seaward River is a river in New Zealand's South Island. It flows northeast from its origins in north Canterbury's Puketeraki Range, reaching the Hurunui River 35 kilometres (22 mi) southwest of Culverden.

== See also ==
- List of rivers of New Zealand
