= Electric River =

- Route of the Electric River
- Mouth of the Electric River Electric River (South Island)

Location
- Country: New Zealand

Physical characteristics
- Source
  - location: Kaherekoau Mountains
  - coordinates: 45°49′25″S 167°12′29″E
- Mouth
  - location: Lake Monowai
  - coordinates: 45°52′10″S 167°20′57″E

Basin features
- Progression: Electric River → Lake Monowai → Monowai River → Waiau River → Foveaux Strait

The Electric River is a river of Fiordland, New Zealand. It arises around Lake Jaquiery in the Kaherekoau Mountains and flows eastward into Lake Monowai at June Bay.

== See also ==
- List of rivers of New Zealand
