= Whakataki River =

- Route of the Whakataki River
- Mouth of the Whakataki River Whakataki River (North Island)
- Native name: Whakataki (Māori)

Location
- Country: New Zealand
- Island: North Island
- Region: Wellington
- District: Masterton

Physical characteristics
- Source: Mangahoeka
  - coordinates: 40.78795°S 176.18998°E
- Mouth: Pacific Ocean
  - coordinates: 40°52′10″S 176°13′38″E
  - elevation: Sea level
- Length: 15 km (9.3 mi)

Basin features
- Progression: Whakataki River → Pacific Ocean
- Cities: Whakataki
- Tributaries
  - left: Kaingaake Stream
  - right: Pukeatua Stream
- Bridges: Bridge near 5689 Masterton-Castlepoint Road, Bridge near 5796 Masterton-Castlepoint Road

The Whakataki River is a river of Wellington region of New Zealand's North Island. It flows generally south before turning east to reach the Pacific Ocean five kilometres north of Castlepoint.

== See also ==
- List of rivers of New Zealand
- List of rivers of Wellington Region
