= Whenuakite River =

Coordinates: 36°54′S 175°43′E

Location
- Country: New Zealand

Physical characteristics
- Mouth
  - location: Whitianga Harbour
- Length: 16 km (9.9 mi)

The Whenuakite River is one of the longer rivers on the Coromandel Peninsula, in the Waikato Region of New Zealand's North Island. It flows initially north from its sources close to the peninsula's southeast coast north of Tairua, before turning west to reach the southernmost point of the Whitianga Harbour.

== See also ==
- List of rivers of New Zealand
