= Matakohe River =

Coordinates: 36.113020°S 174.203385°E

Location
- Country: New Zealand

Physical characteristics
- Mouth
  - location: Arapaoa River
- Length: 7 km (4.3 mi)

The Matakohe River is a river of the Northland Region of New Zealand's North Island. The river is a short tributary of the Arapaoa River, which it joins 15 kilometres (9 mi) east of Ruawai.

== See also ==
- List of rivers of New Zealand
