= Otiake River =

Coordinates: 44°48′S 170°32′E

Location
- Country: New Zealand

The Otiake River is a river in New Zealand, a tributary of the Waitaki River.

== See also ==
- List of rivers of New Zealand
