= Okari River =

Coordinates: 41°50′S 171°28′E

Location
- Country: New Zealand

Physical characteristics
- Source
  - location: Paparoa Range
- Mouth
  - location: Tasman Sea
- Length: 14 km (8.7 mi)

The Okari River is a river of the West Coast Region of New Zealand's South Island. The river flows northwest from its sources at the northern end of the Paparoa Range crossing the swampy terrain of Addisons Flat to reach the Tasman Sea eight kilometres south of Cape Foulwind.

== See also ==
- List of rivers of New Zealand
