= Tawarau River =

Coordinates: 38°16′S 174°51′E

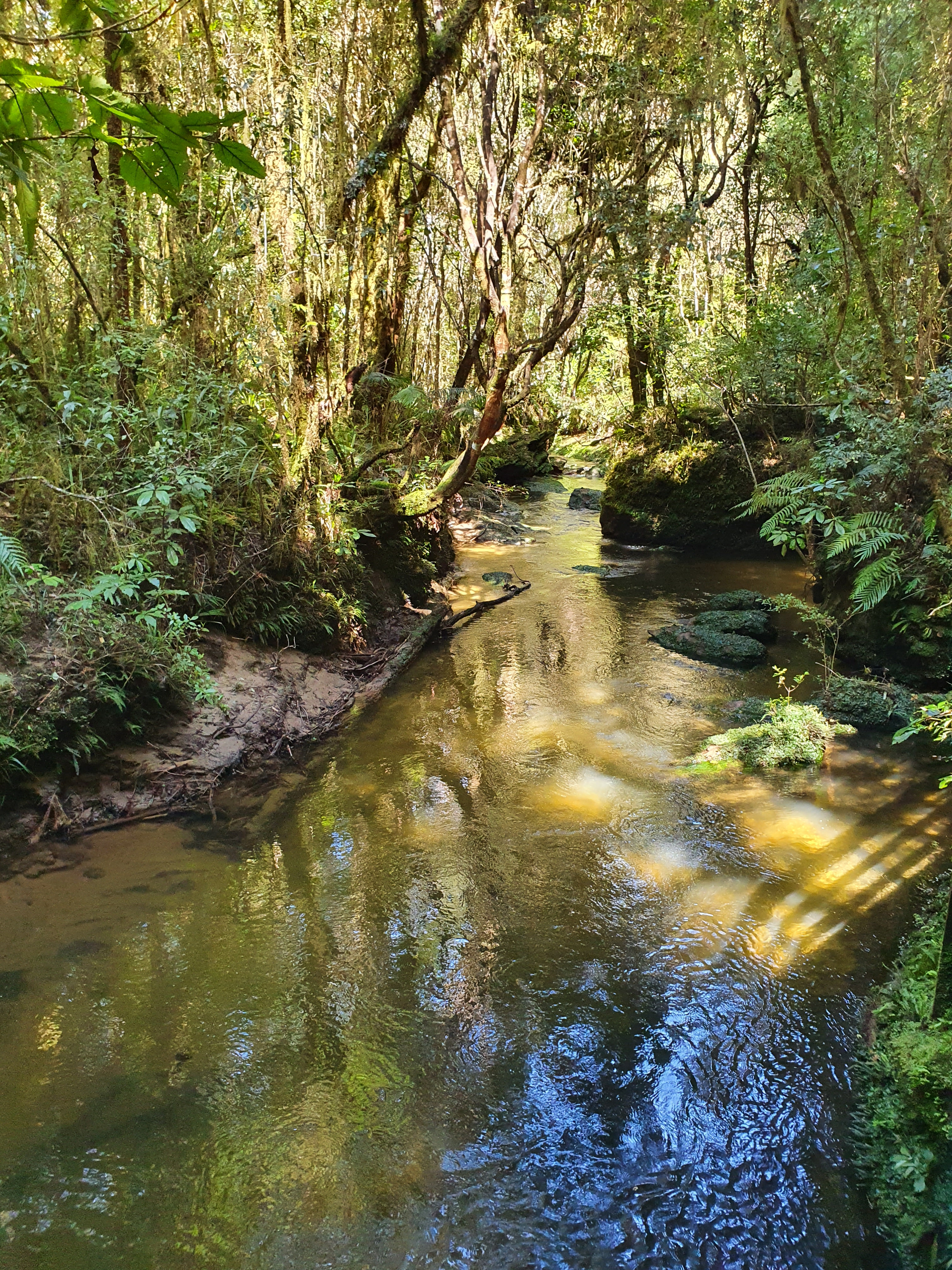

Location
- Country: New Zealand

Physical characteristics
- Mouth
  - location: Marokopa River
- Length: 15 km (9.3 mi)

The Tawarau River is a river of the southern Waikato Region of New Zealand's North Island. It flows northwest to reach the Marokopa River 12 kilometres (7 mi) from the latter's outflow into the North Taranaki Bight.

== See also ==
- List of rivers of New Zealand
