= Marchburn River =

Coordinates: 41°32′S 173°39′E

Location
- Country: New Zealand

Physical characteristics
- Source
  - location: Marlborough Region

The Marchburn River is a river of Marlborough Region, New Zealand.

== See also ==
- List of rivers of New Zealand
