= Hapuka River =

River in New Zealand

Coordinates: 43°54′37″S 168°53′49″E

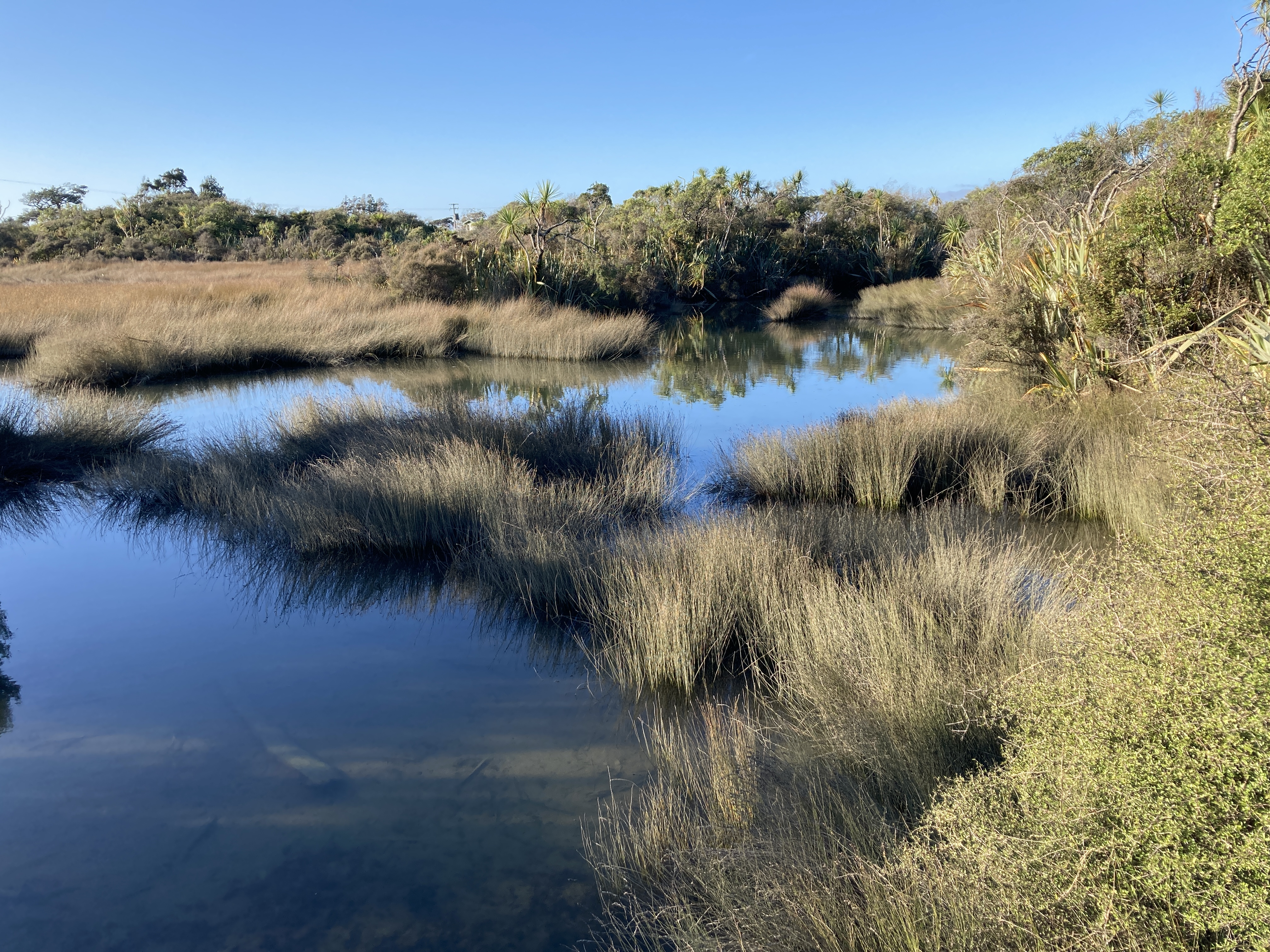
- Hapuka Estuary

Location
- Country: New Zealand

Physical characteristics
- Source
  - location: Westland District
- Mouth
  - location: Tasman Sea

The Hapuka River is a river of Westland District, New Zealand. It flows from near The Woolsack north-west to join the Okuru and Turnbull Rivers just before they enter the Tasman Sea. The river is slow-moving and drains swampy land. There are brown trout in the lagoon area.

== See also ==
- List of rivers of New Zealand
