= Otama River =

Coordinates: 36°43′S 175°46′E

Location
- Country: New Zealand

Physical characteristics
- Length: 4 km (2.5 mi)

The Otama River is a river of the Coromandel Peninsula in New Zealand's North Island. A short river, it flows north from a peninsula on the Coromandel's northeast coast to reach the sea 5 kilometres (3 mi) east of Kūaotunu.

== See also ==
- List of rivers of New Zealand
