= Wilson River (New Zealand) =

- Route of the Wilson River
- Mouth of the Wilson River Wilson River (New Zealand) (South Island)

Location
- Country: New Zealand

Physical characteristics
- Source
  - coordinates: 46°07′01″S 166°48′01″E
- Mouth
  - location: Tasman Sea
  - coordinates: 46°11′23″S 166°38′47″E
  - elevation: 0 m (0 ft)

Basin features
- Progression: Wilson River → Tasman Sea

The Wilson River, New Zealand is a river in southern Fiordland, New Zealand. It flows into the Tasman Sea 5 kilometres (3 mi) south-east of Puysegur Point.

== See also ==
- List of rivers of New Zealand
