= Little Pomahaka River =

Coordinates: 45.511247°S 169.184035°E

Location
- Country: New Zealand

The Little Pomahaka River is a river of New Zealand, a tributary of the Pomahaka River which it joins east of the Whitecoomb Range.

== See also ==
- List of rivers of New Zealand
