= Motatapu River =

Coordinates: 44°36′S 168°57′E

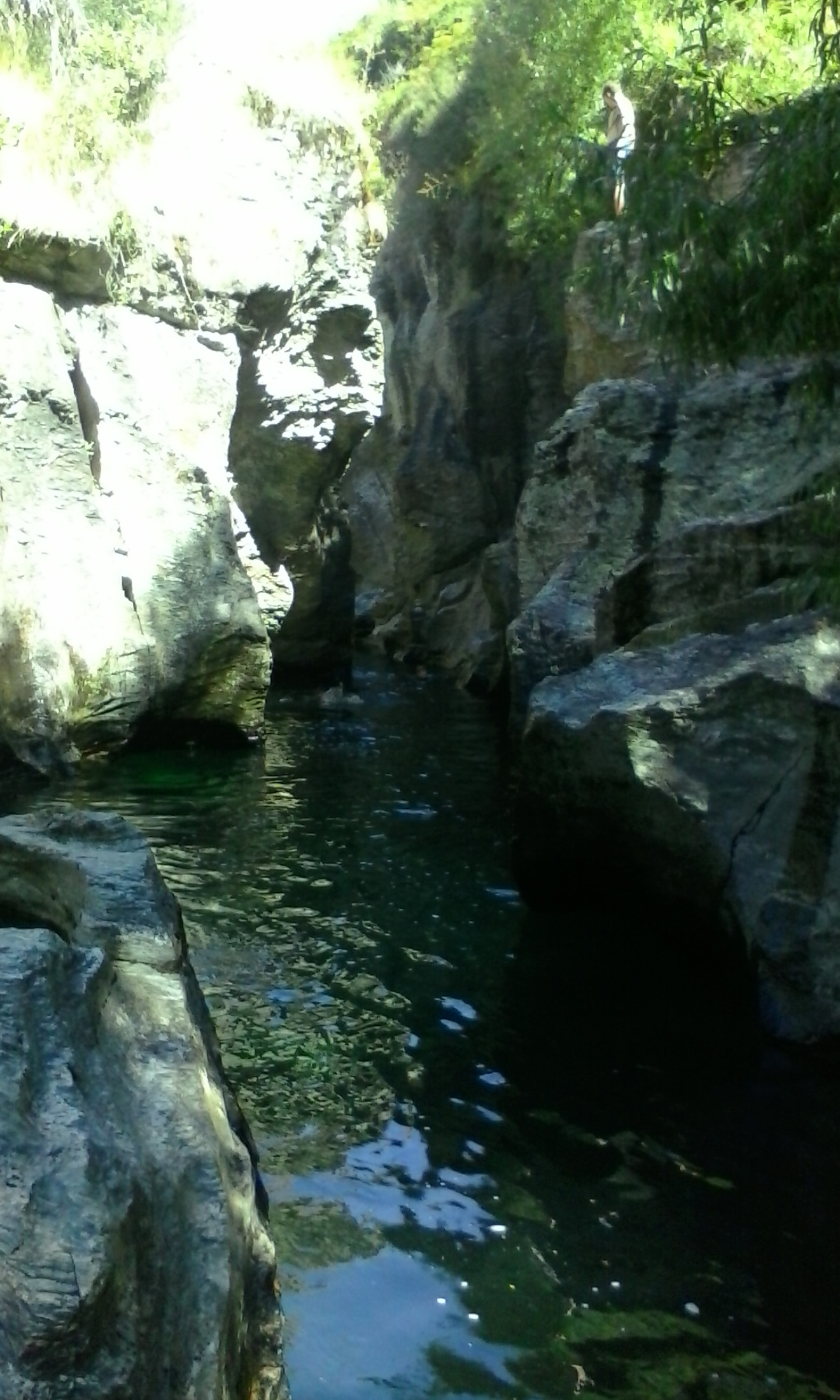
- Upper Motatapu River gorge, a popular swimming spot near Wanaka

Location
- Country: New Zealand

The Motatapu River is a river near Wānaka in New Zealand, a tributary of the Matukituki River.

== See also ==
- List of rivers of New Zealand
