= Mangaorino River =

Coordinates: 38°18′S 175°12′E

Location
- Country: New Zealand

Physical characteristics
- Mouth
  - location: Mangapu River

The Mangaorino River is a river of the Waikato region of New Zealand's North Island. It is a tributary of the Mangapu River, which it meets 10 kilometres (6 mi) north of Te Kūiti.

== See also ==
- List of rivers of New Zealand
