= Anatori River =

Location
- Country: New Zealand

Physical characteristics
- Mouth
  - location: Tasman Sea
  - coordinates: 40.70013°S 172.36533°E

The Anatori River is a small river in a remote part of Tasman District in the far northwest of New Zealand's South Island. The river rises as two streams (north and south branch) in the Wakamarama Range, running northwest then north for approximately 12 kilometres (7.5 mi). The river mouth is accessible via a rough road down the west coast from Farewell Spit and Collingwood, the nearest town. There is a tiny settlement, Anatori, at the river mouth.

== See also ==
- List of rivers of New Zealand
