= Tauraroa River =

Coordinates: 35°56′S 174°06′E

Location
- Country: New Zealand

Physical characteristics
- Mouth
  - location: Manganui River
- Length: 21 km (13 mi)

The Tauraroa River is a river of the Northland Region of New Zealand's North Island. It flows west from near the North Auckland Peninsula's east coast 15 kilometres southwest of Whangārei, reaching the Manganui River 15 kilometres east of Dargaville.

== See also ==
- List of rivers of New Zealand
