= Ohinemaka River =

River in New Zealand

Coordinates: 43.628702°S 169.498882°E

Location
- Country: New Zealand

Physical characteristics
- Source
  - location: Strachan Range
- Mouth
  - location: Tasman Sea
- Length: 13 km (8.1 mi)

The Ohinemaka River is a river of the West Coast Region of New Zealand's South Island. It flows northwest from the slopes of Mount Reynolds, at the western end of the Strachan Range, reaching the Tasman Sea to the southwest of Bruce Bay.

== See also ==
- List of rivers of New Zealand
