= Patutahi River =

Coordinates: 35°36′S 174°00′E

Location
- Country: New Zealand

Physical characteristics
- Mouth
  - location: Kaikou River
- Length: 15 km (9.3 mi)

The Patutahi River is a river of the Northland Region of New Zealand's North Island. A tributary of the Kaikou River, it flows northwest before turning southwest to enter the Kaikou 25 miles (40 km) south of Moerewa.

== See also ==
- List of rivers of New Zealand
