= Wairakei River =

Coordinates: 38°37′S 176°05′E

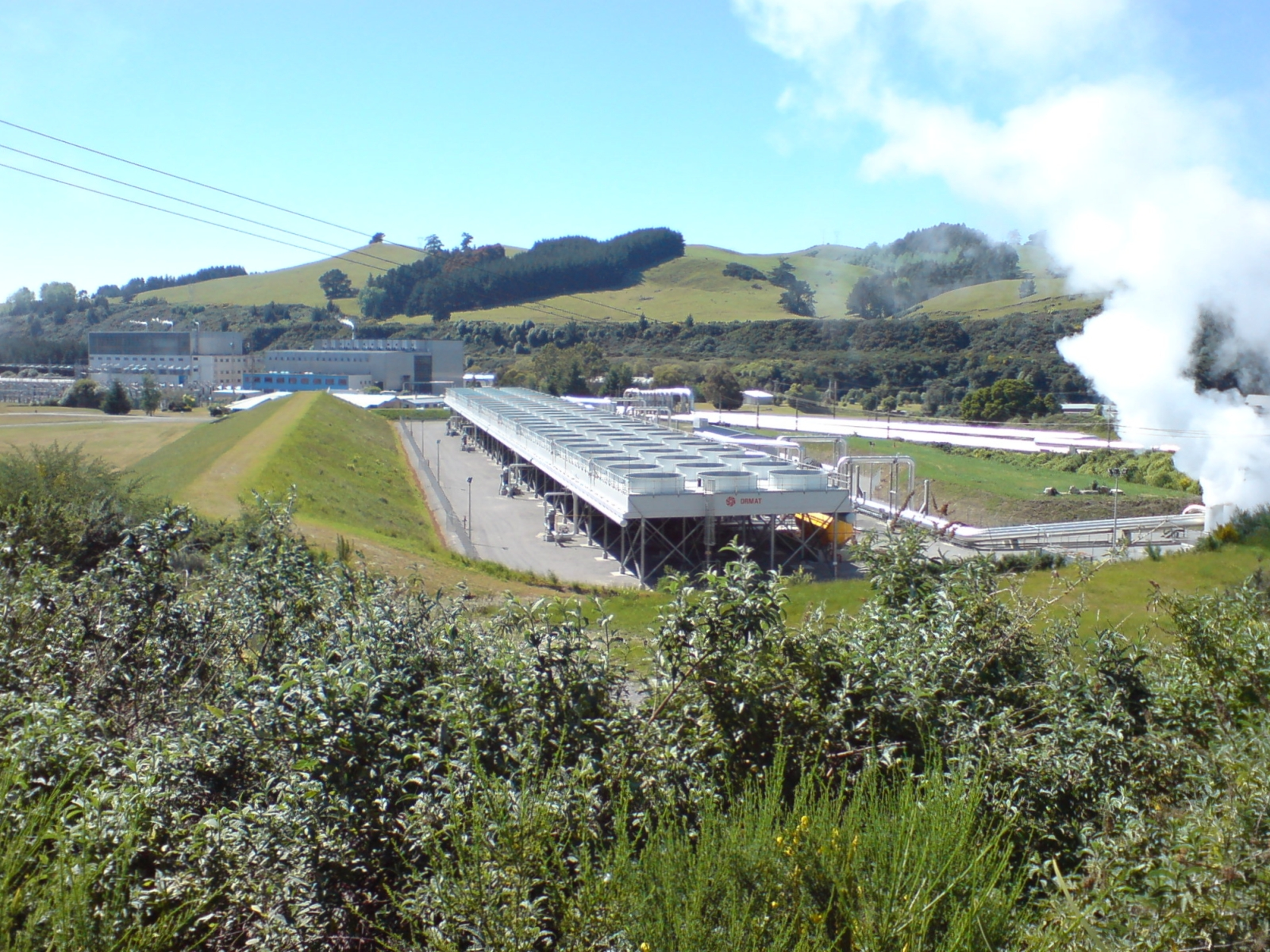

Location
- Country: New Zealand

Physical characteristics
- Mouth
  - location: Waikato River
- Length: 10 km (6.2 mi)

The Wairakei River or Wairakei Stream is a river of the Waikato Region of New Zealand's North Island. It flows southeast to meet the Waikato River, which it does at the town of Wairakei, 10 kilometres north of Taupō.

== See also ==
- List of rivers of New Zealand
