= Waihoihoi River =

Coordinates: 36°01′S 174°25′E

Location
- Country: New Zealand

Physical characteristics
- Mouth
  - location: Waipu River

The Waihoihoi River is a river of the Northland Region of New Zealand's North Island. it is a tributary of the Waipu River, which it reaches close to the town of Waipu.

== See also ==
- List of rivers of New Zealand
