= Karakatūwhero River =

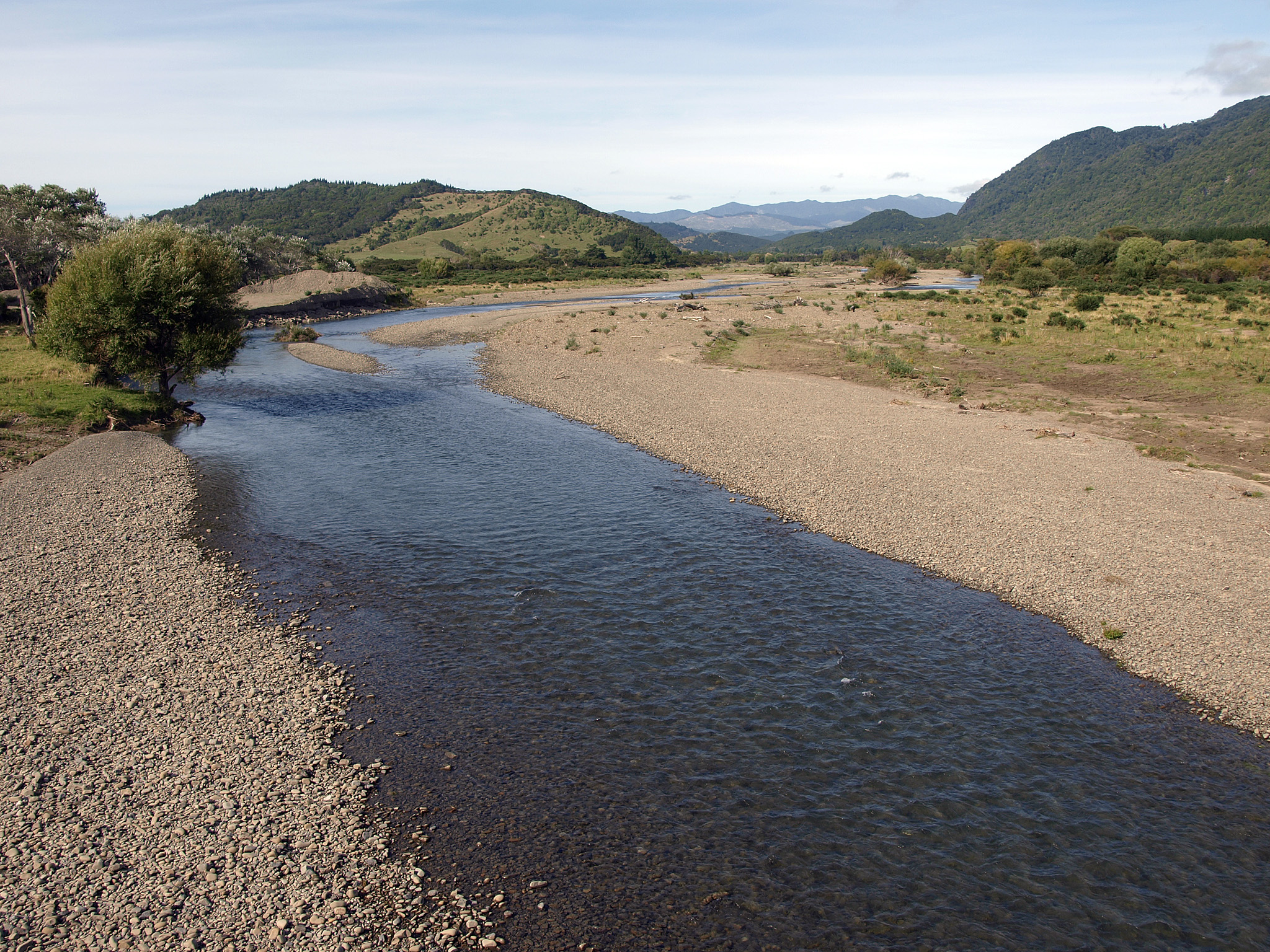
- Karakatūwhero River seen from the Karakatūwhero River Bridge
- Route of the Karakatūwhero River
- Mouth of the Karakatūwhero River Karakatūwhero River (North Island)

Location
- Country: New Zealand

Physical characteristics
- Source: Confluence of Onematariki Stream and Tapatu Stream
  - coordinates: 37°40′33″S 178°12′56″E
- Mouth
  - location: Kawakawa Bay
  - coordinates: 37°37′12″S 178°20′26″E
- Length: 24 km (15 mi)

Basin features
- Progression: Karakatūwhero River → Kawakawa Bay → Pacific Ocean
- Tributaries
  - left: Tawaroa Stream, Mokotā Stream, Parinui Stream, Matapū Stream, Waipirita Stream, Wairenga Stream
  - right: Waihīrere Stream, Mangaiti Stream
- Bridges: Karakatūwhero River Bridge

The Karakatūwhero River is a river of New Zealand. It is located in the Gisborne District in the northeast the North Island. The river flows east then northeast, reaching the Pacific coast 3 kilometres (2 mi) northwest of the town of Te Araroa.

== See also ==
- List of rivers of New Zealand
