= Waiomoko River =

- Route of the Waiomoko River
- Mouth of the Waiomoko River Waiomoko River (North Island)
- Native name: Waiomoko (Māori)

Location
- Country: New Zealand
- Island: North Island
- Region: Gisborne

Physical characteristics
- Source: Confluence of Ōtāwaiwai Stream and Wharekiri Stream
  - coordinates: 38.48524°S 178.15019°E
- Mouth: Pacific Ocean
  - coordinates: 38°34′30″S 178°13′21″E
- Length: 17 km (11 mi)

Basin features
- Progression: Waiomoko River → Pacific Ocean
- Tributaries
  - right: Wairoa Stream
- Bridges: Waiomoko River Bridge (3000)

The Waiomoko River is a river of the Gisborne Region of New Zealand's North Island. It flows southeast to reach the Pacific Ocean 22 kilometres (14 mi) northeast of the city of Gisborne.

== See also ==
- List of rivers of New Zealand
