= Kaiikanui River =

Coordinates: 35°32′S 174°17′E

Location
- Country: New Zealand

Physical characteristics
- Length: 18 km (11 mi)

The Kaiikanui River is a river of Northland, New Zealand.

== See also ==
- List of rivers of New Zealand
