= Puremāhaia River =

River in Tasman District, New Zealand

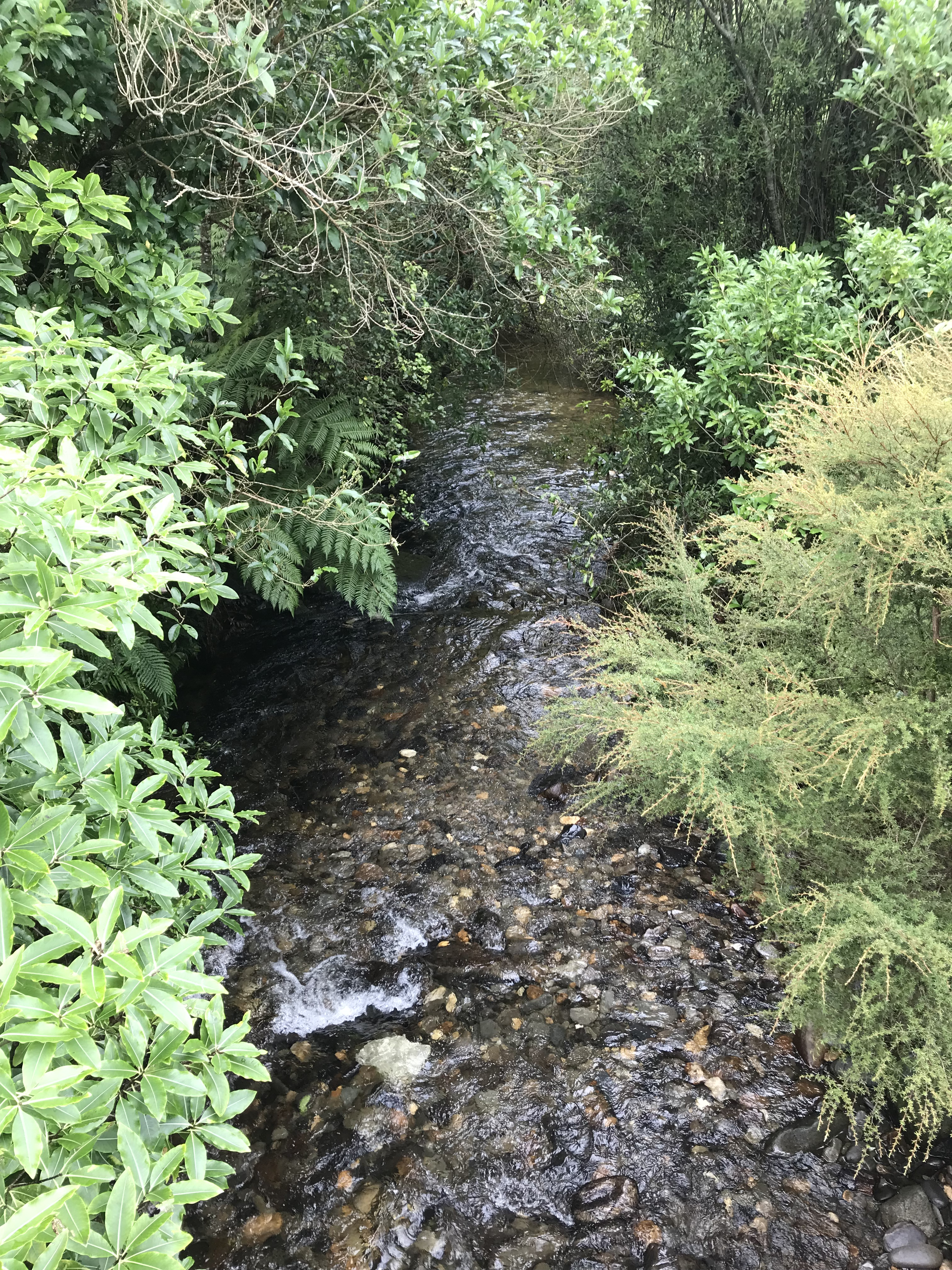
- Puremāhaia River at the SH60 bridge
- Route of the Puremāhaia River
- Mouth of the Puremāhaia River Puremāhaia River (South Island)

Location
- Country: New Zealand

Physical characteristics
- Source
  - coordinates: 40°49′49″S 172°43′03″E
- Mouth
  - location: Golden Bay / Mohua
  - coordinates: 40°47′33″S 172°46′00″E

Basin features
- Progression: Puremāhaia River → Golden Bay / Mohua → Tasman Sea

The Puremāhaia River is a river of the Tasman Region of New Zealand's South Island. It flows northeast through Puramāhoi, where it crosses under State Highway 60, before reaching Golden Bay five kilometres northwest of Tākaka.

== See also ==
- List of rivers of New Zealand
