= Waipekakoura River =

Coordinates: 35°14′S 173°50′E

Location
- Country: New Zealand

Physical characteristics
- Mouth
  - location: Kerikeri River
- Length: 13 km (8.1 mi)

The Waipekakoura River is a river of the Northland Region of New Zealand's North Island. It flows east to reach the Kerikeri River five kilometres west of Kerikeri.

== See also ==
- List of rivers of New Zealand
