= Fleming River =

Coordinates: 46°35′S 169°25′E

Location
- Country: New Zealand

Physical characteristics
- Source
  - location: Maclennan Range
- Mouth
  - location: Tautuku River

The Fleming River is a river of the eastern Catlins, New Zealand. A tributary of the Tautuku River, it rises west of Soaker Hill in the Maclennan Range and flows south-eastward through the Catlins Forest Park to join that river at Tautuku.

== See also ==
- List of rivers of New Zealand
