= Hemphill River =

River in New Zealand

- Route of the Hemphill River
- Mouth of the Hemphill River Hemphill River (South Island)

Location
- Country: New Zealand

Physical characteristics
- Source
  - coordinates: 41.4411°S 172.2210°E
- Mouth
  - location: Maori Gully
  - coordinates: 41°32′17″S 172°11′09″E
- Length: 12 kilometres (7.5 mi)

Basin features
- Progression: Hemphill River → Maori Gully → Mōkihinui River North Branch → Mōkihinui River → Karamea Bight → Tasman Sea

The Hemphill River is a river of the northwestern South Island of New Zealand. It flows through rugged country to the south of Kahurangi National Park, forming two small lakes (Lake Phyllis and Lake Marina) on its route south to join with Maori Gully, flowing into the Mōkihinui River shortly after.

== See also ==
- List of rivers of New Zealand
