= Christopher River =

Coordinates: 42°17′S 172°33′E

Location
- Country: New Zealand

Physical characteristics
- Source
  - location: Spenser Mountains
- Mouth
  - location: Ada River
- Length: 5 km (3.1 mi)

The Christopher River is a river of New Zealand, and lies just outside and immediately to the south of Nelson Lakes National Park. It flows south for 5 kilometres (3 mi) before joining the Ada River, an upper tributary of the Waiau River.

== See also ==
- List of rivers of New Zealand
