= Waiaruhe River =

Location
- Country: New Zealand

Physical characteristics
- Mouth: Waitangi River
  - location: Puketona, New Zealand
  - coordinates: 35°17′58″S 173°57′42″E
- Length: 18 km (11 mi)

The Waiaruhe River is a river of the Northland Region of New Zealand's North Island. It flows northeast from its origins close to Ngawha Springs to reach the northern Waitangi River ten kilometres south of Kerikeri.

== See also ==
- List of rivers of New Zealand
