= Sinclair River =

Coordinates: 43°25′S 170°49′E

Location
- Country: New Zealand

Physical characteristics
- Mouth
  - location: Clyde River
- Length: 10 km (6.2 mi)

The Sinclair River is a river of the Canterbury region of New Zealand's South Island. It flows south from the Jollie Range and is one of the headwaters of the Clyde River, part of the upper Rangitata River system.

== See also ==
- List of rivers of New Zealand
