= Maraetaha River =

- Route of the Maraetaha River
- Mouth of the Maraetaha River Maraetaha River (North Island)
- Native name: Maraetaha (Māori)

Location
- Country: New Zealand
- Island: North Island
- Region: Gisborne

Physical characteristics
- Source: Confluence of Manganuiawea Stream and Tarakihinui Stream
  - coordinates: 38.83986°S 177.89869°E
- Mouth: Pacific Ocean
  - coordinates: 38°47′16″S 177°55′48″E
- Basin size: 65 km^{2} (25 sq mi)

Basin features
- Progression: Maraetaha River → Pacific Ocean
- Tributaries
  - left: Purupuruwhaka Stream, Waihinehine Stream, Wairakaia Stream
- Bridges: Maraetaha River No. 4 Bridge, Maraetaha River No. 3 Bridge, Maraetaha River No. 2 Bridge, Maraetaha River No. 1 Bridge

The Maraetaha River is a river of the Gisborne District, New Zealand, which flows into the Pacific Ocean south of Muriwai and Young Nick's Head.

== Geography ==
The river begins at the confluence of the Manganuiawea Stream and Tarakihinui Stream, in Bartletts near Wharerata Road. It travels in a northerly direction, being met by the Purupuruwhaka Stream and Waihinehine Stream on its left bank. The river curves to the east where it meets the Wairakaia Stream, then travels southeast towards the Pacific Ocean south of Muriwai and Young Nick's Head.

The river past the Maraetaha River No. 1 Bridge is saline.

== History ==
At least four fortified pā sites are located along bends of the river, with a shell fragment in a pit dating to between the 16th and early 18th centuries.

In 1938, significant flooding changed the course of the river.

== See also ==
- List of rivers of New Zealand
