= Miner River =

Coordinates: 41°23′S 173°13′E

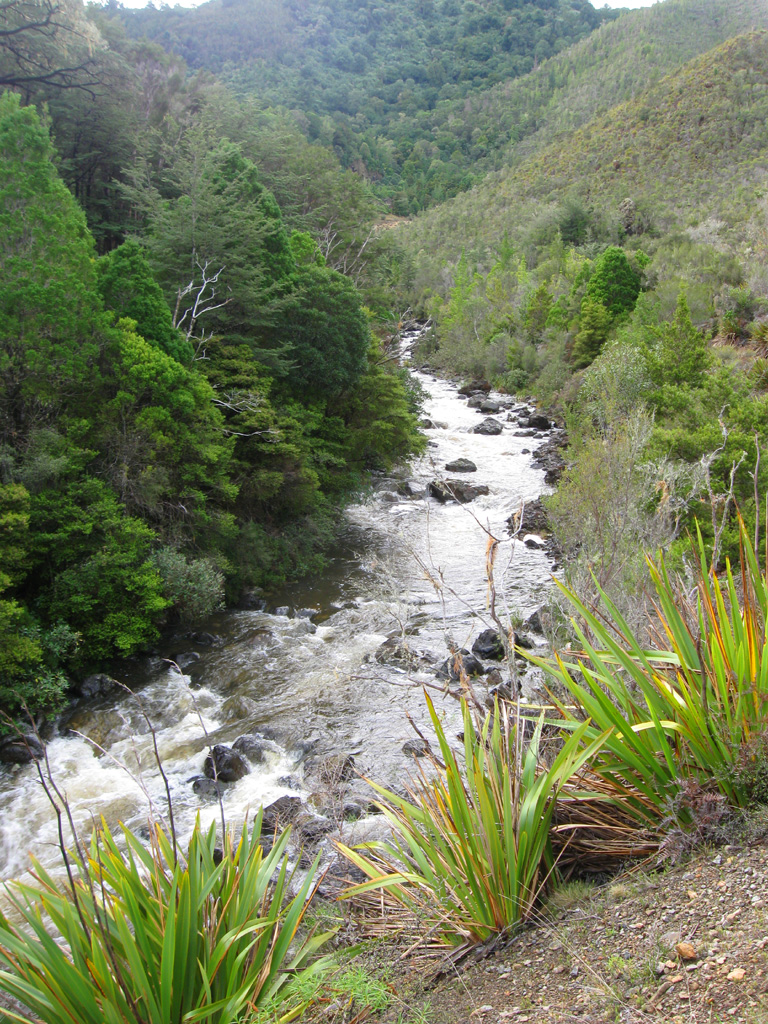

Location
- Country: New Zealand

Physical characteristics
- Source
  - location: Bryant Range
- Mouth
  - location: Roding River
- Length: 9 km (5.6 mi)

The Miner River is a river of the Tasman Region of New Zealand's South Island. It rises in hills 10 kilometres (6 mi) south of Nelson city centre close to the southern end of the Bryant Range, flowing west to joining with the Roding River 4 kilometres (2.5 mi) south of Richmond.

== See also ==
- List of rivers of New Zealand
