= Karukaru Stream =

Coordinates: 35.762792°S 174.066666°E

Karukaru River

Location
- Country: New Zealand

The Karukaru River is a river in New Zealand. A tributary of the Wairua River, it rises west of Maungatapere and flows westward into that river south of Titoki.

== See also ==
- List of rivers of New Zealand
