= Kopeka River =

Coordinates: 47°08′S 167°56′E

Location
- Country: New Zealand

The Kopeka River is a river of Stewart Island / Rakiura, New Zealand. Rising east of Mount Allen, it flows south-eastward into the sea west of Toitoi Bay.

== See also ==
- List of rivers of New Zealand
