= Kaiwara River =

Coordinates: 42°53′S 173°04′E

Location
- Country: New Zealand

Physical characteristics
- Length: 20 km (12 mi)

The Kaiwara River is a river of the northern South Island of New Zealand. The river is a tributary of the Hurunui River, its outflow being 17 kilometres (11 mi) southwest of Cheviot. The river flows initially east before turning southwest, twisting through a valley in the Lowry Peaks Range which lies between Cheviot and Culverden.

== See also ==
- List of rivers of New Zealand
