= Cavendish River =

- Route of the Cavendish River
- Mouth of the Cavendish River Cavendish River (South Island)

Location
- Country: New Zealand

Physical characteristics
- Source: Caton Peak
  - coordinates: 46°03′19″S 166°52′56″E
- Mouth
  - location: Foveaux Strait
  - coordinates: 46°12′36″S 166°52′20″E
  - elevation: 0 m (0 ft)
- Length: 15 km (9 mi)

Basin features
- Progression: Cavendish River → Foveaux Strait

The Cavendish River is a river of New Zealand. It is one of the southernmost rivers of the country's South Island, flowing south for 15 kilometres (9 mi) to reach Foveaux Strait on the southern coast of Fiordland. The river was named in 1882 by John Hay in commemoration of Lord Frederick Cavendish, who was murdered in Dublin's Phoenix Park earlier that year.

== See also ==
- List of rivers of New Zealand
