= Paturau River =

River in Tasman District, New Zealand

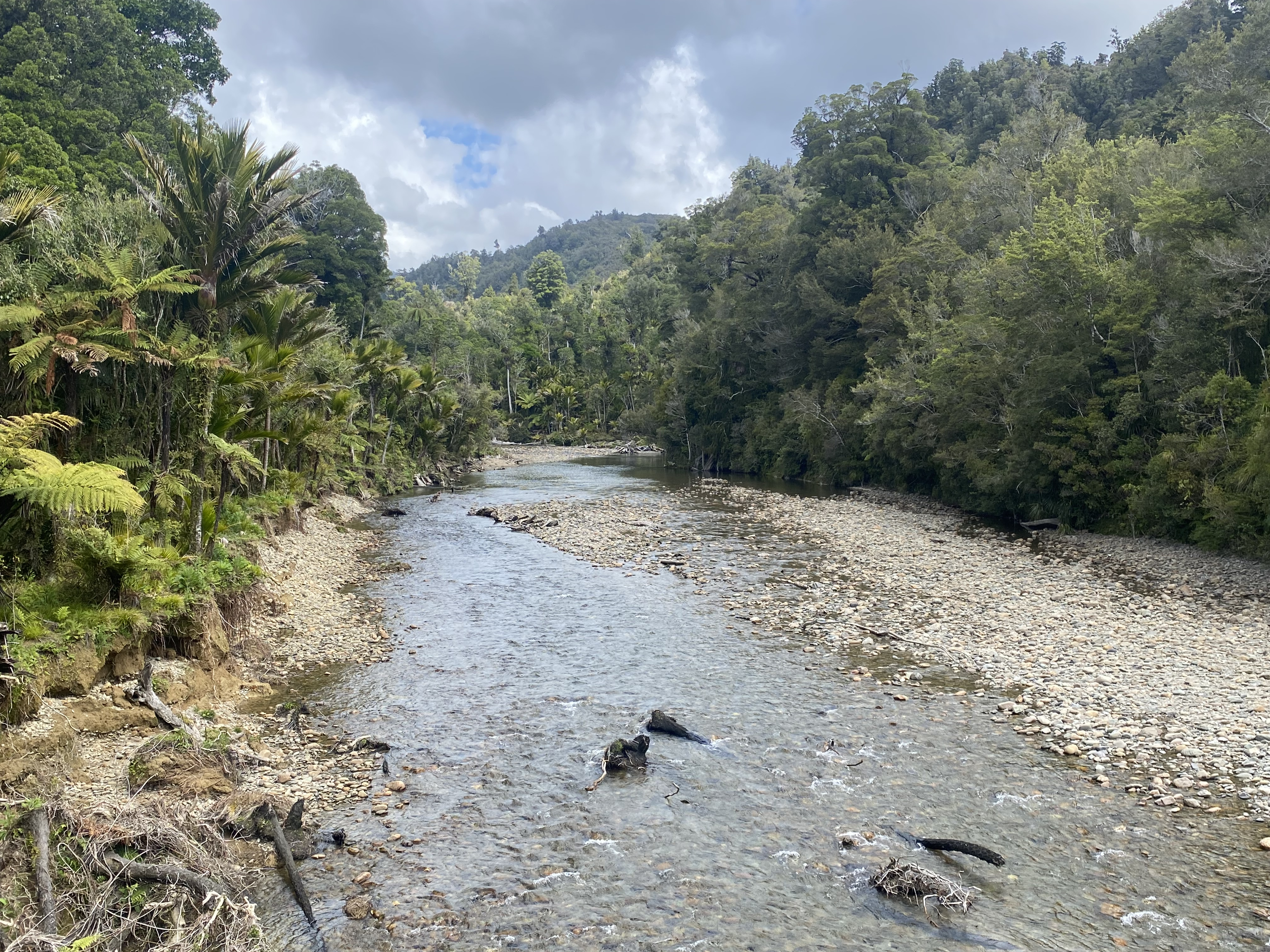
- Paturau River as seen from the abandoned bridge
- Route of the Paturau River
- Mouth of the Paturau River Paturau River (South Island)

Location
- Country: New Zealand

Physical characteristics
- Source
  - location: Wakamarama Range
  - coordinates: 40°40′19″S 172°33′13″E
- Mouth
  - location: Tasman Sea
  - coordinates: 40°42′06″S 172°37′00″E
  - elevation: 0 metres (0 ft)
- Length: 29 kilometres (18 mi)

Basin features
- Progression: Paturau River → Tasman Sea
- Tributaries
  - left: Long Creek
  - right: Simmiss Creek, Higgins Branch, Toe Rag Creek, Rocky Creek, Thompson Creek, Camp Creek

The Paturau River (sometimes spelt Patarau) is a river of the Tasman Region of New Zealand's South Island. One of the northernmost rivers in the South Island, it flows predominantly north from its sources in the Wakamarama Range to reach the Tasman Sea 20 kilometres west of Collingwood.

== See also ==
- List of rivers of New Zealand
