= Mangonuiowae River =

Coordinates: 35°17′S 173°20′E

Location
- Country: New Zealand

Physical characteristics
- Mouth
  - location: Rotokakahi River

The Mangonuiowae River is a river of New Zealand's Northland Region. It is a tributary of the Rotokakahi River, which it reaches 10 kilometres (6 mi) northeast of Whangape Harbour

== See also ==
- List of rivers of New Zealand
