= Whakaikai River =

River in New Zealand

Coordinates: 43°01′S 170°30′E

Location
- Country: New Zealand

Physical characteristics
- Mouth
  - location: Tasman Sea
- Length: 5 km (3.1 mi)

The Whakaikai River is a short river of the West Coast Region of New Zealand's South Island. It flows generally northwest to reach the Tasman Sea five kilometres to the northwest of the mouth of the Wanganui River.

== See also ==
- List of rivers of New Zealand
