= Waionepu River =

Coordinates: 35°49′S 174°10′E

Location
- Country: New Zealand

Physical characteristics
- Mouth
  - location: Waiotama River
- Length: 12 km (7.5 mi)

The Waionepu River is a river of the Northland Region of New Zealand's North Island. It flows generally west from its sources south of Maungatapere to reach the Waiotama River 20 kilometres (12 miles) southwest of Whangārei.

== See also ==
- List of rivers of New Zealand
