= Taiharuru River =

Coordinates: 35°43′S 174°33′E

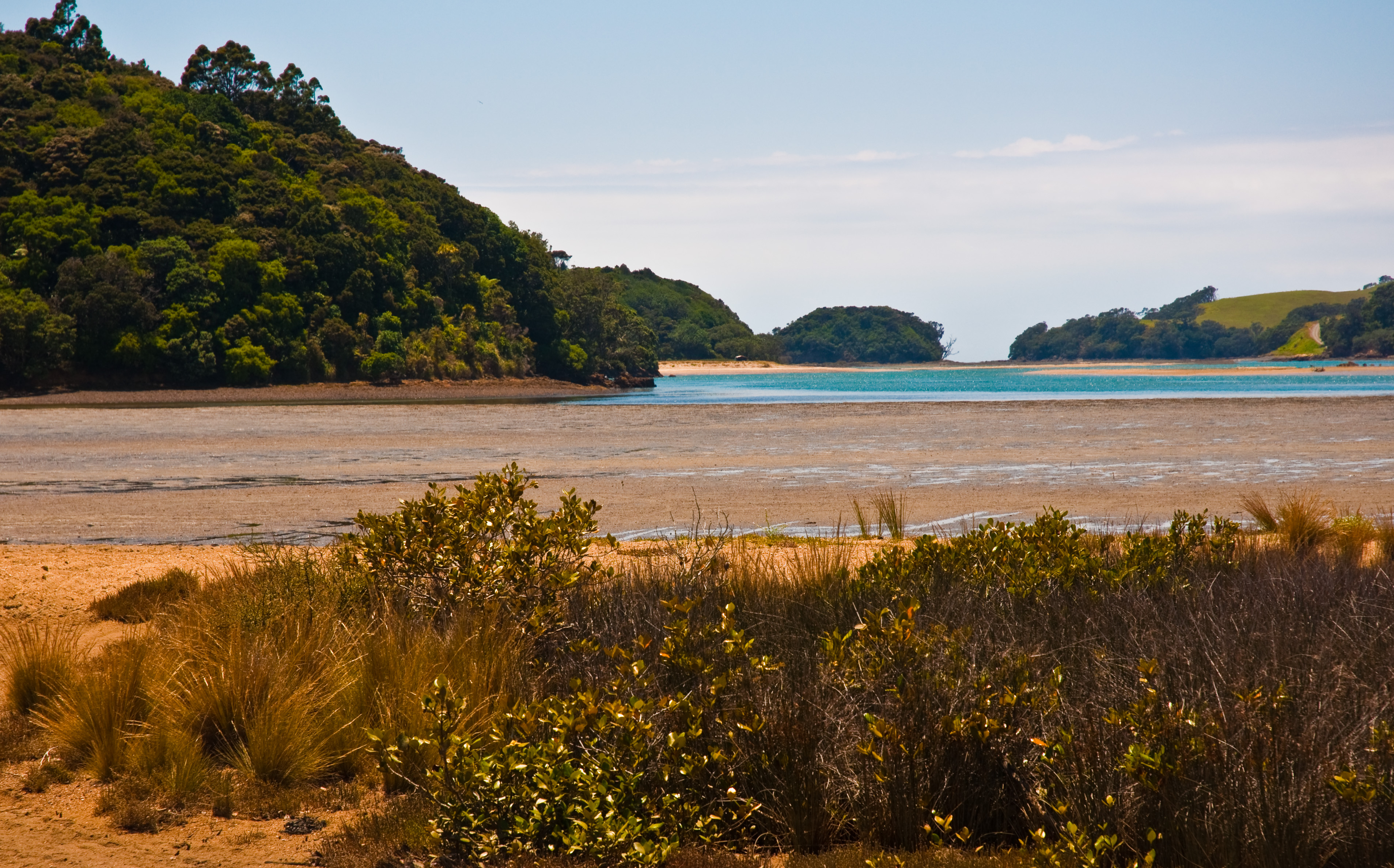
- Taiharuru River estuary near Pataua

Location
- Country: New Zealand

Physical characteristics
- Mouth
  - location: Ngunguru Bay
- Length: 10 km (6.2 mi)

The Taiharuru River is a river of the Northland Region of New Zealand's North Island. It flows predominantly northeast from its sources east of Whangārei, emptying into the southern end of Ngunguru Bay. About half of the river's length is a silty drowned valley.

The New Zealand Ministry for Culture and Heritage gives a translation of "resounding sea" for Taiharuru.

== See also ==
- List of rivers of New Zealand
