= Pahau River =

River in New Zealand

Coordinates: 42°50′S 172°54′E

Location
- Country: New Zealand

Physical characteristics
- Source
  - location: Tekoa Range
- Mouth
  - location: Hurunui River
- Length: 40 km (25 mi)

The Pahau River or Pahu River is a river of the north Canterbury region of New Zealand's South Island. It has its origins in the Tekoa Range, 25 kilometres (16 mi) northwest of Culverden, and flows initially north before turning south to flow down a long valley between two ridges. At the northern edge of the Canterbury Plains it turns southeast, flowing past the southern outskirts of Culverden to reach the Hurunui River 8 kilometres (5 mi) southeast of the town.

== See also ==
- List of rivers of New Zealand
