= Lochy River =

Coordinates: 45°11′S 168°42′E

Location
- Country: New Zealand

The Lochy River is a river of New Zealand, flowing into lower Lake Wakatipu.

Lochy River was named by Donald Angus Cameron.

== See also ==
- List of rivers of New Zealand
