= Manakaiaua River =

River in New Zealand

Coordinates: 43°33′S 169°42′E

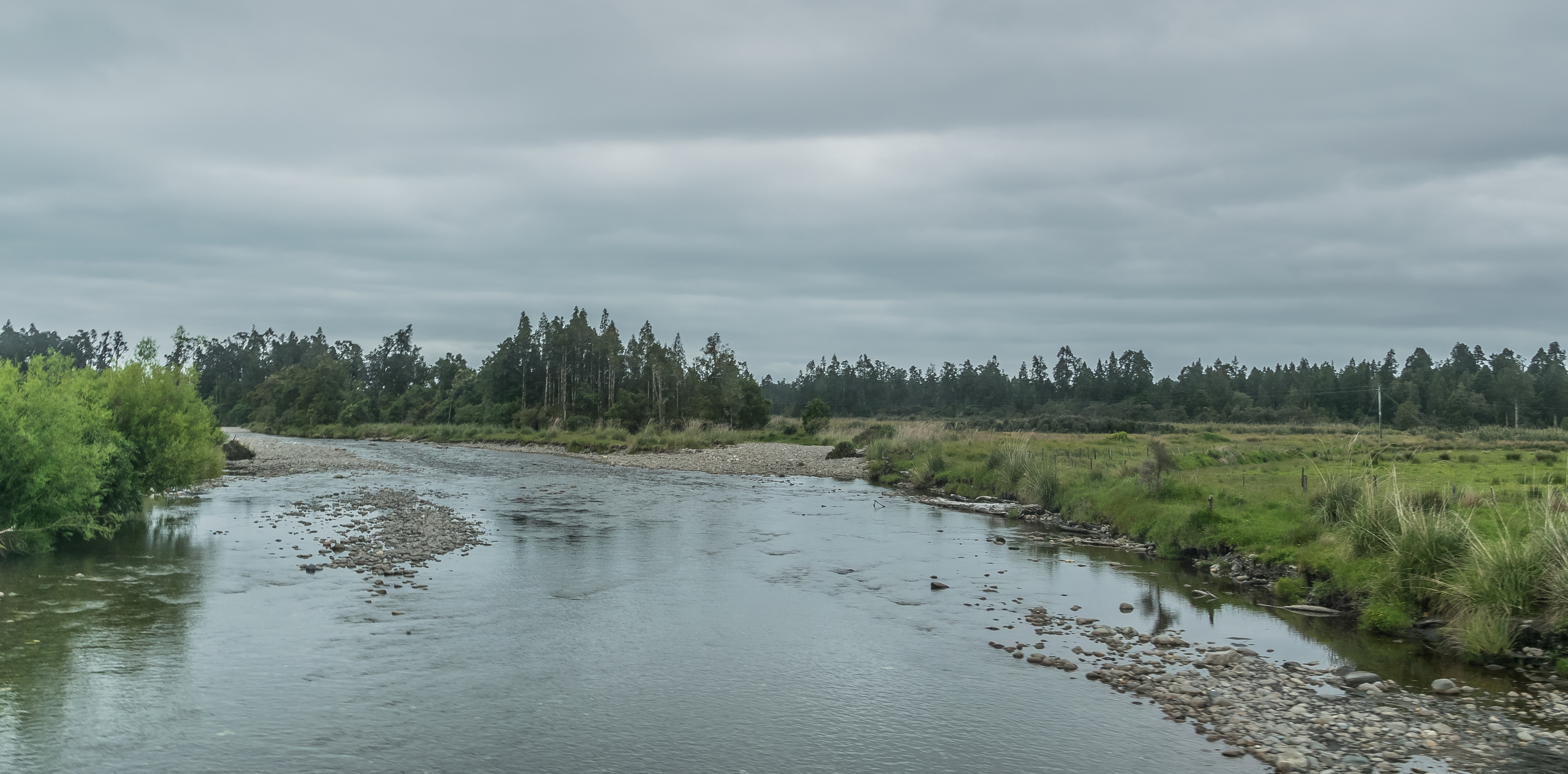
- The Manakaiaua River from the Stage Highway 6 bridge

Location
- Country: New Zealand

Physical characteristics
- Source
  - location: Southern Alps
- Mouth
  - location: Tasman Sea
- Length: 20 km (12 mi)

The Manakaiaua River is a river of the West Coast Region of New Zealand's South Island. It flows generally northwest from its source on the slopes of Mount Ritchie in the Bare Rocky Range, part of the Southern Alps, reaching the Tasman Sea to the north of Bruce Bay.

== See also ==
- List of rivers of New Zealand
