= Pēria River =

River in New Zealand

Coordinates: 35°05′47″S 173°29′25″E

Location
- Country: New Zealand

Physical characteristics
- Source
  - location: Maungataniwha Range
- Mouth
  - location: Oruru River
- Length: 14 km (8.7 mi)

The Pēria River is a river of the Northland Region of New Zealand's North Island. It flows generally north from its origins in the Maungataniwha Range to reach the Oruru River 10 kilometres (6 mi) south of Mangonui.

In 2026, the spelling of the river's name was officially altered from Peria to Pēria.

== See also ==
- List of rivers of New Zealand
