= Waitoetoe River =

Coordinates: 38°58′S 174°25′E

Location
- Country: New Zealand

The Waitoetoe River is a small river of the Taranaki Region of New Zealand's North Island. It flows close to the town of Urenui.

== See also ==
- List of rivers of New Zealand
