= Shenandoah River (New Zealand) =

Coordinates: 41°59′S 172°12′E

Location
- Country: New Zealand

Physical characteristics
- Mouth
  - location: Maruia River
- Length: 10 km (6.2 mi)

The Shenandoah River is a river in New Zealand's West Coast Region. It flows northwest to reach the Maruia River 25 kilometres southeast of Inangahua.

== See also ==
- List of rivers of New Zealand
