= Ounuora River =

Coordinates: 36°53′S 175°40′E

Location
- Country: New Zealand

Physical characteristics
- Source
  - location: Coromandel Range
- Mouth
  - location: Whitianga Harbour
- Length: 11 km (6.8 mi)

The Ounuora River is a river of the Coromandel Peninsula in the Waikato Region of New Zealand's North Island. It flows generally east from the Coromandel Range, reaching the Whitianga Harbour close to the small settlement of Mill Creek, 5 kilometres (3 mi) southwest of Whitianga.

== See also ==
- List of rivers of New Zealand
