= North Opuha River =

Coordinates: 44°00′S 170°53′E

Location
- Country: New Zealand

Physical characteristics
- Source
  - location: Sherwood Range
- Mouth
  - location: Opuha Lake
- Length: 22 km (14 mi)

The North Opuha River is a river of the south Canterbury region of New Zealand's South Island. It flows south from its sources in the Sherwood Range, and drains into the northern end of Opuha Lake, 15 kilometres (9 mi) north of Fairlie.

== See also ==
- List of rivers of New Zealand
