= Mataroa River =

Coordinates: 35°31′S 174°21′E

Location
- Country: New Zealand

Physical characteristics
- Mouth
  - location: whakapara River

The Mataroa River is a river of New Zealand. It is a tributary of the Northland Region's Whakapara River, which it meets close to the settlement of Opuawhanga.

== See also ==
- List of rivers of New Zealand
