= Otto River =

Coordinates: 42°18′S 172°03′E

Location
- Country: New Zealand

The Otto River is a short river of the West Coast Region of New Zealand's South Island. It is one of the headwaters of the Grey River.

== See also ==
- List of rivers of New Zealand
