= Ōmaumau River =

River in the Auckland Region, New Zealand

- Mouth of the Ōmaumau River Ōmaumau River (New Zealand)
- Route of the Ōmaumau River

Location
- Country: New Zealand
- Region: Auckland Region

Physical characteristics
- Source
  - coordinates: 36.4752°S 174.4809°E
- Mouth: Kaipara Harbour
  - coordinates: 36.4491°S 174.4309°E
- Length: 6 km (4 mi)

Basin features
- Progression: Ōmaumau River → Kaipara Harbour → Tasman Sea

The Ōmaumau River is a middle order stream in the Auckland Region of New Zealand's North Island. It flows northwest to reach the Kaipara Harbour 20 kilometres (12 mi) northeast of Helensville. The catchment consists of rural pasture and fragmented native forest.

== See also ==
- List of rivers of New Zealand
