= Hapuawai River =

Coordinates: 35°06′30″S 173°55′52″E

Location
- Country: New Zealand

Physical characteristics
- Source
  - location: Far North District
- Mouth
  - location: Takou River

The Hapuawai River is a short river in the Far North District of New Zealand. It joins the Takou River shortly before its mouth in Takou Bay in the South Pacific Ocean.

== See also ==
- List of rivers of New Zealand
