= Rotowhenua River =

Coordinates: 35°19′S 173°14′E

Location
- Country: New Zealand

Physical characteristics
- Mouth
  - location: Awaroa River, Whangape Harbour

The Rotowhenua River is a river of the Northland Region of New Zealand's North Island. A short, broad river, it flows into the Awaroa River to form a northern arm of the Whangape Harbour.

== See also ==
- List of rivers of New Zealand
