= Kurow River =

Coordinates: 44°45′S 170°30′E

Location
- Country: New Zealand

The Kurow River is a river of North Otago, New Zealand. A tributary of the Waitaki River, it rises in Saint Marys Range and flows into that river downstream of Kurow.

== See also ==
- List of rivers of New Zealand
