= Otamatapaio River =

Coordinates: 44°32′S 170°07′E

Location
- Country: New Zealand

The Otamatapaio River is a river in North Otago, New Zealand. It rises in the Hawkdun Range and flows north-eastward into Lake Benmore.

== See also ==
- List of rivers of New Zealand
