= Edison River =

River in New Zealand

Coordinates: 43°45′S 169°44′E

Location
- Country: New Zealand

Physical characteristics
- Source
  - location: Solution Range
- Mouth
  - location: Mahitahi River

The Edison River is a river of the Westland District of New Zealand. It arises in the Solution Range near Mount Elliot and flows north-west and north into the Mahitahi River.

== See also ==
- List of rivers of New Zealand
