= Castaly River =

Coordinates: 42°39′S 173°16′E

Location
- Country: New Zealand

Physical characteristics
- Source
  - location: Mount Parnassus
- Mouth
  - location: Leader River
- Length: 8 km (5.0 mi)

The Castaly River is a river of New Zealand. It is in north Canterbury, northwest of the township of Parnassus, and flows generally east for 8 kilometres (5 mi) before joining the Leader River, itself a tributary of the Waiau River.

== See also ==
- List of rivers of New Zealand
