= Pupuke River =

Coordinates: 35°05′S 173°43′E

Location
- Country: New Zealand

Physical characteristics
- Mouth
  - location: Whangaroa Harbour
- Length: 11 km (6.8 mi)

The Pupuke River is a river of the Northland Region of New Zealand's North Island. It flows northeast to reach the southern end of Whangaroa Harbour 5 miles (8 km) northwest of Kaeo.

== See also ==
- List of rivers of New Zealand
