= Toaroha River =

River in New Zealand

Coordinates: 42.892532°S 171.123752°E

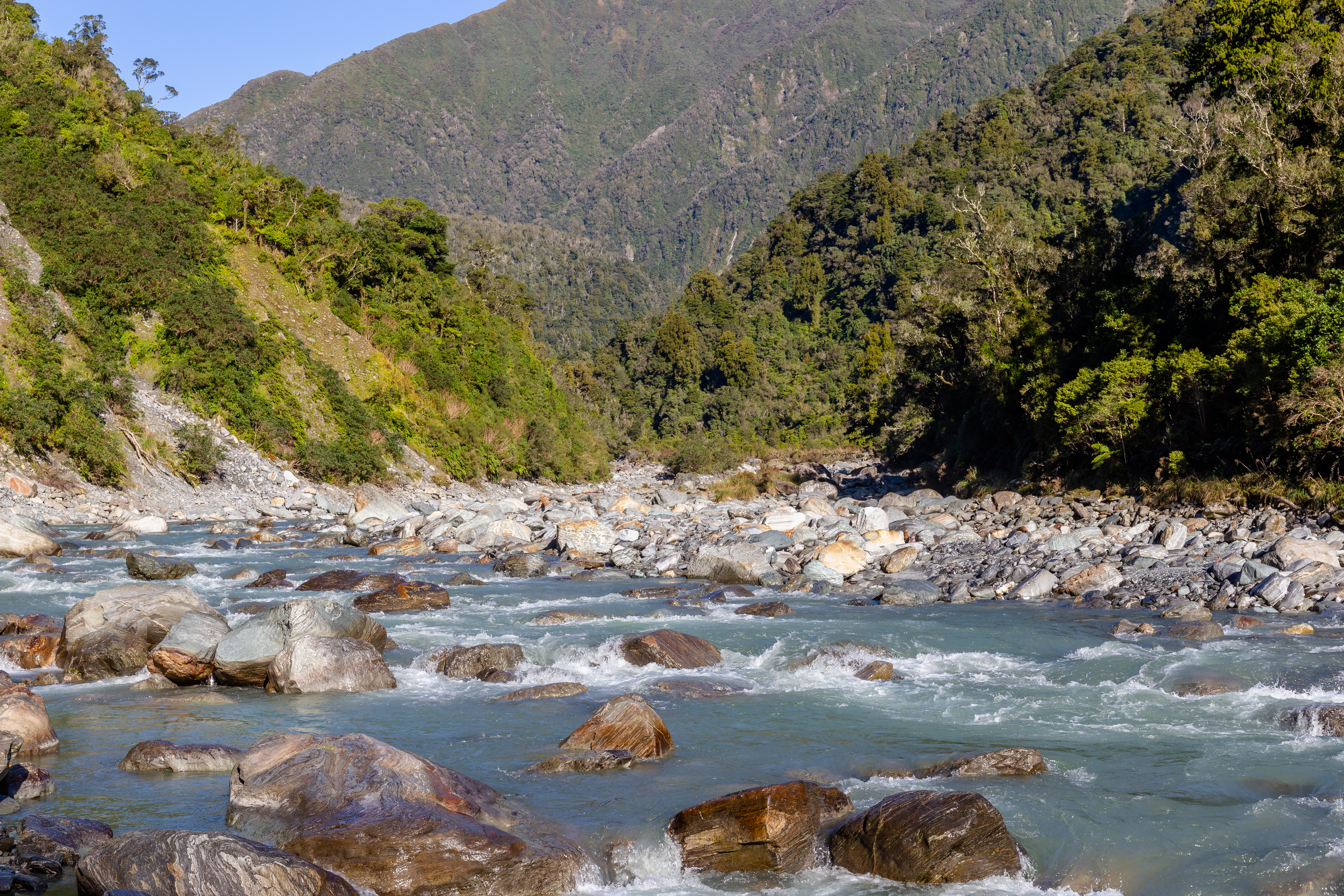

Location
- Country: New Zealand

Physical characteristics
- Mouth
  - location: Kokatahi River
- Length: 13 km (8.1 mi)

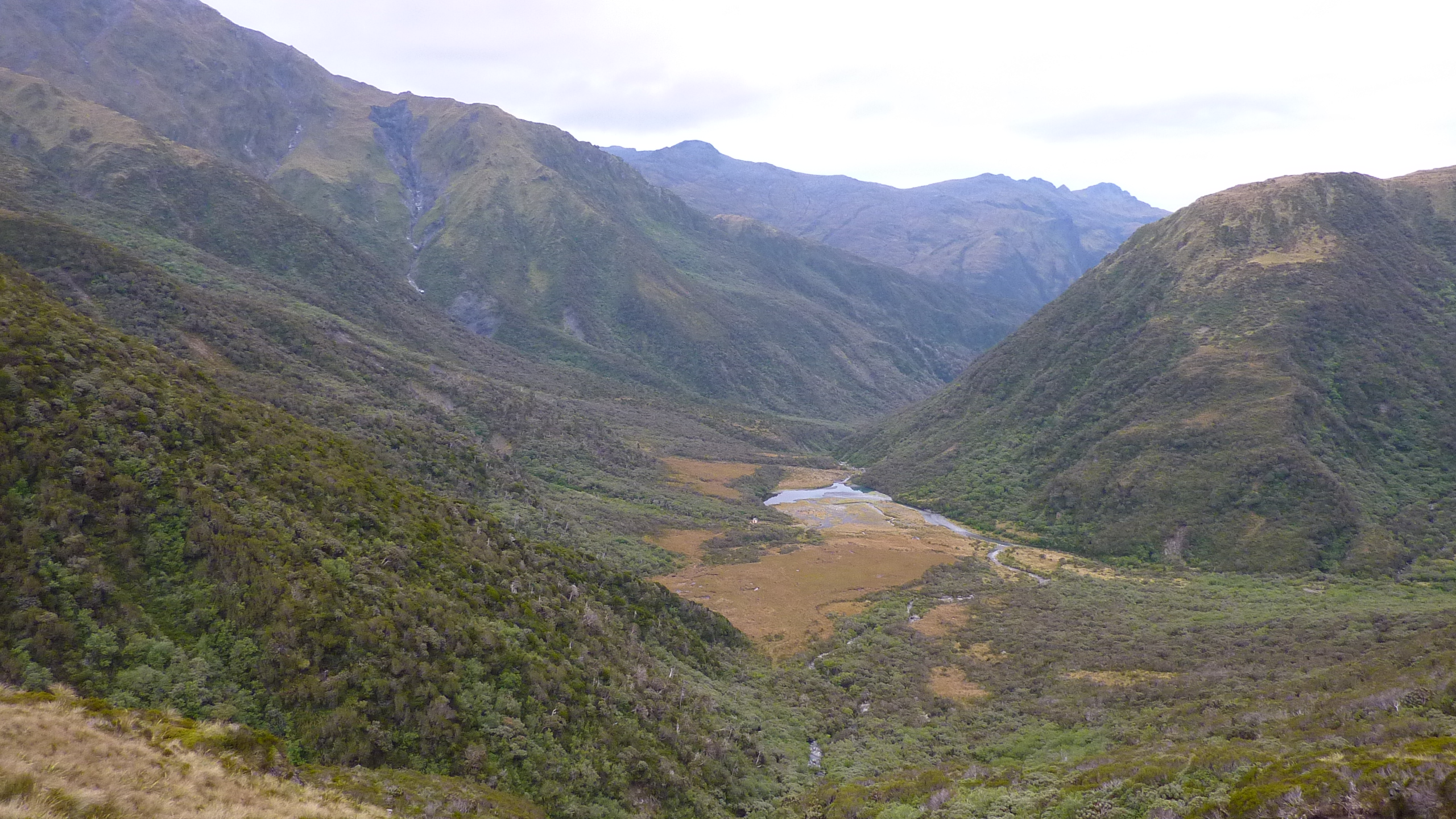
Toaroha River Valley - from near the Toaroha Saddle

The Toaroha River is a river of the West Coast Region of New Zealand's South Island. It flows generally north through a valley between the Toaroha and Diedrichs Ranges to reach the Kokatahi River 25 kilometres southeast of Hokitika.

== See also ==
- List of rivers of New Zealand
