= Whareatea River =

Coordinates: 41°44′S 171°42′E

Location
- Country: New Zealand

Physical characteristics
- Mouth
  - location: Karamea Bight
- Length: 10 km (6.2 mi)

The Whareatea River is a river of the West Coast Region of New Zealand's South Island. It flows generally northwest to reach the Tasman Sea five kilometres to the east of Westport.

== See also ==
- List of rivers of New Zealand
