= Moutere River =

Coordinates: 41.14454°S 173.00489°E

Location
- Country: New Zealand

Physical characteristics
- Mouth
  - location: Tasman Bay / Te Tai-o-Aorere
- Length: 24 km (15 mi)

The Moutere River is a river of the Tasman Region of New Zealand's South Island. It flows north from its origins southwest of Māpua, reaching Tasman Bay / Te Tai-o-Aorere at the Moutere Inlet, a tidal lagoon three kilometres south of Motueka.

== See also ==
- List of rivers of New Zealand
