= Waimamakau River =

Coordinates: 35°34′S 173°31′E

Location
- Country: New Zealand

Physical characteristics
- Mouth
  - location: Waimamaku River

The Waimamakau River is a short river of the Northland Region of New Zealand's North Island. Confusingly, it is a tributary of the Waimamaku River, reaching the latter 10 kilometres southeast of Ōmāpere.

== See also ==
- List of rivers of New Zealand
