= Whakapohai River =

River in New Zealand

Coordinates: 43°42′S 169°15′E

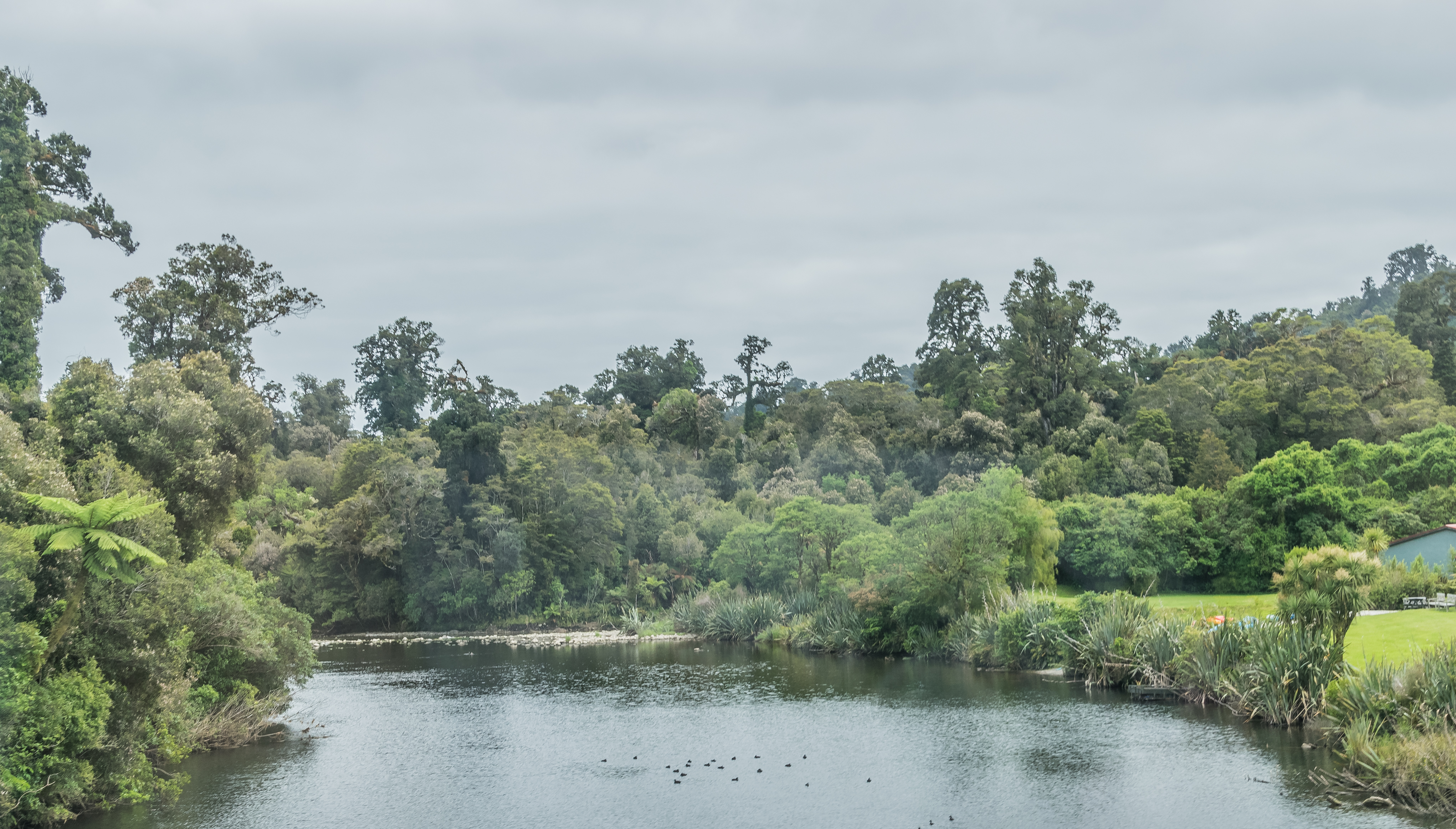

Location
- Country: New Zealand

Physical characteristics
- Source
  - location: Mataketake Range
- Mouth
  - location: Tasman Sea
- Length: 14 km (8.7 mi)

The Whakapohai River is a river of the West Coast Region of New Zealand's South Island. It flows generally northwest to reach the Tasman Sea to the west of Lake Moeraki.

== See also ==
- List of rivers of New Zealand
