= Waiwawa River =

Coordinates: 36°54′S 175°42′E

Location
- Country: New Zealand

Physical characteristics
- Source
  - location: Coromandel Range
- Mouth
  - location: Whitianga Harbour
- Length: 21 km (13 mi)

The Waiwawa River is the longest river on the Coromandel Peninsula, in the Waikato Region of New Zealand's North Island. It flows initially northwest from its sources on the slopes of Mount Rowe before turning northeast to reach the southern end of the Whitianga Harbour.

== See also ==
- List of rivers of New Zealand
