= Orutua River =

- Route of the Orutua River
- Mouth of the Orutua River Orutua River (North Island)

Location
- Country: New Zealand
- Island: North Island
- Region: Gisborne

Physical characteristics
- Source: Confluence of the Waiiti Stream and Te Awakari Stream
  - coordinates: 37°39′31″S 178°26′45″E
- Mouth: Pacific Ocean
  - coordinates: 37°38′26″S 178°26′58″E
- Length: 10 km (6.2 mi)

Basin features
- Progression: Orutua River → Pacific Ocean
- Tributaries
  - left: Mangamakawe Stream
- Bridges: Oru Tua Bridge

The Orutua River is a river of the Gisborne Region of New Zealand's North Island. One of the country's easternmost rivers, it rises in rough hill country to the southwest of East Cape, flowing north to reach the Pacific Ocean to the east of Te Araroa.

== See also ==
- List of rivers of New Zealand
