= Mangakurī River =

- Route of the Mangakurī River
- Mouth of the Mangakurī River Mangakurī River (North Island)
- Native name: Mangakurī (Māori)

Location
- Country: New Zealand
- Island: North Island
- Region: Hawke's Bay
- District: Central Hawke's Bay District

Physical characteristics
- Source: Rangitapu
  - coordinates: 40.05814°S 176.8213°E
- Mouth: Hawke Bay
  - location: Kairākau Beach
  - coordinates: 39°56′48″S 176°55′41″E
  - elevation: Sea level
- Length: 14 km (8.7 mi)

Basin features
- Progression: Mangakurī River → Hawke Bay → Pacific Ocean
- River system: Mangakurī River Catchment
- Tributaries
  - left: Waterfalls Creek, Pōnui Stream
- Bridges: Clareinch Road bridge, Mangakuri Road bridge

The Mangakuri River is a river of the Hawke's Bay region of New Zealand's North Island. It flows north, paralleling the Pacific Ocean coast before veering northeast to reach the sea at Kairākau Beach, 35 kilometres (22 mi) south of Cape Kidnappers.

== See also ==
- List of rivers of New Zealand
