= Onaero River =

Coordinates: 39°00′S 174°23′E

Location
- Country: New Zealand

Physical characteristics
- Mouth
  - location: North Taranaki Bight
- Length: 18 km (11 mi)

The Onaero River is a river of the Taranaki Region of New Zealand's North Island. It rises on the slopes of Taramoukou, 14 kilometres south of Urenui, reaching the sea two kilometres to the west of the same town.

== See also ==
- List of rivers of New Zealand
