= Tawapuku River =

River in New Zealand

Coordinates: 35°34′S 173°50′E

Location
- Country: New Zealand

Physical characteristics
- Mouth
  - location: Awarua River

The Tawapuku River is a river of the Northland Region of New Zealand's North Island. It flows generally southwest to join the Awarua River 40 kilometres north of Dargaville.

== See also ==
- List of rivers of New Zealand
