= Wilkinson River =

River in New Zealand

Coordinates: 43°08′S 171°00′E

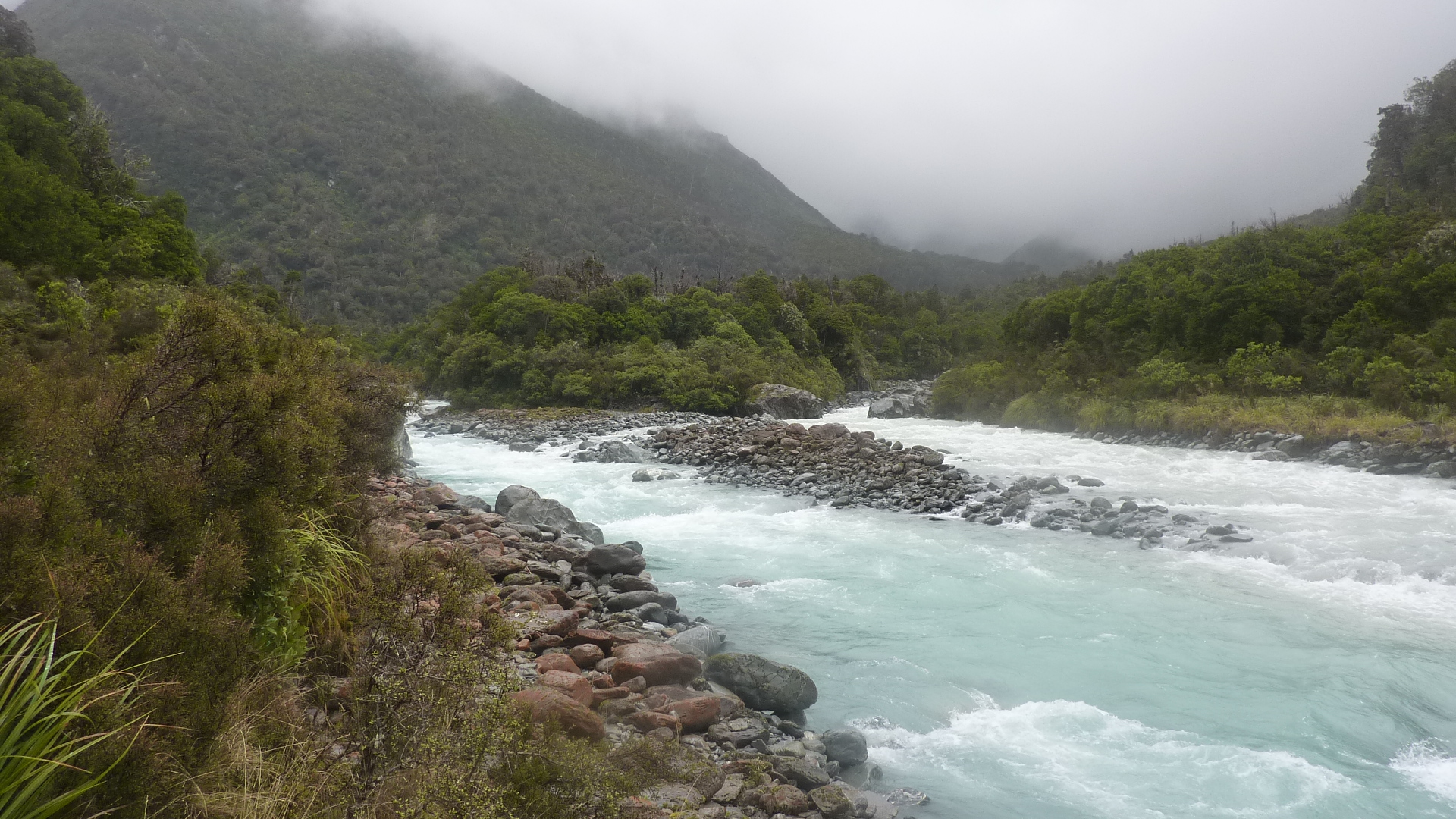
- Wilkinson River (on RHS) meets the Whitcombe River

Location
- Country: New Zealand

Physical characteristics
- Mouth
  - location: Whitcombe River

The Wilkinson River is a short river of the West Coast Region of New Zealand's South Island. It is a tributary of the Whitcombe River.

== See also ==
- List of rivers of New Zealand
