= Rotokino River =

River in New Zealand

Coordinates: 43°11′S 170°25′E

Location
- Country: New Zealand

Physical characteristics
- Source
  - location: Lake Rotokino
- Mouth
  - location: Whataroa River
- Length: 3 km (1.9 mi)

The Rotokino River is a short river of the West Coast Region of New Zealand's South Island. It flows south from Lake Rotokino, draining its waters to the Whataroa River.

== See also ==
- List of rivers of New Zealand
