= Perunui River =

Coordinates: 35°23′S 173°33′E

Location
- Country: New Zealand

Physical characteristics
- Mouth
  - location: Hokianga Harbour

The Perunui River is a short river of the Northland Region of New Zealand's North Island. It is one of the many feeder rivers of the Hokianga Harbour system.

== See also ==
- List of rivers of New Zealand
