= Tokanui River =

Coordinates: 46.610946°S 168.833181°E

Location
- Country: New Zealand

The Tokanui River is a river in New Zealand, flowing into Toetoes Bay.

== See also ==
- List of rivers of New Zealand
