= Mahakirau River =

Coordinates: 36°51′S 175°40′E

Location
- Country: New Zealand

Physical characteristics
- Source
  - location: Coromandel Range
- Mouth
  - location: Whitianga Harbour
- Length: 14 km (8.7 mi)

The Mahakirau River is a river of the Coromandel Peninsula in New Zealand's North Island. It flows east from its source in the Coromandel Range, reaching the sea at Whitianga Harbour southwest of Whitianga.

== See also ==
- List of rivers of New Zealand
