= Stony River (Canterbury) =

Coordinates: 44°21′54″S 170°15′8″E

- Location of the mouth within New Zealand

Location
- Country: New Zealand

Physical characteristics
- Source
  - location: Grampian Mountains
  - elevation: 1,530 m (5,020 ft)
- Mouth
  - location: Lake Benmore
  - elevation: 370 m (1,210 ft)
- Length: 30 km (19 mi)

The Stony River is a river in the South Island of New Zealand. Rising at southern end of the Grampian Mountains, it runs west for 30 kilometres (19 mi) through rough country to the Mackenzie Basin before emptying into Lake Benmore.
