= Ahuroa River =

Coordinates: 35.975339°S 174.421014°E

Location
- Country: New Zealand

Physical characteristics
- Mouth
  - location: Waipu River

The Ahuroa River is a river in the Northland Region of the North Island of New Zealand.

It is a tributary of the Waipu River which it joins close to the town of Waipu.
