= Fork Stream =

Coordinates: 44°00′16″S 170°24′54″E

- Location of the mouth within New Zealand

Location
- Country: New Zealand

Physical characteristics
- Source
  - location: Gamack Range
- Mouth
  - location: Tekapo River

The Fork Stream is a river in the Canterbury region of New Zealand. It arises in the Gamack Range and flows south-east into the Tekapo River, which exits at Lake Benmore and eventually via the Waitaki River into the Pacific Ocean. Fraser Stream is a tributary. A high proportion of the stream's flow comes from snow melt.

There are trout in the stream.
