= Racehorse River =

Coordinates: 35°20′S 174°19′E

Location
- Country: New Zealand

Physical characteristics
- Mouth
  - location: Whangaruru Harbour

The Racehorse River is a river of the Northland Region of New Zealand's North Island. It flows southeast into Whangaruru Harbour 22 kilometres (14 mi) east of Paihia.

== See also ==
- List of rivers of New Zealand
