= Swin Burn =

River in New Zealand

- Location within New Zealand
- Location: Otago, New Zealand
- Coordinates: 45.137°S 170.318°E

Swin Burn is a river in Otago, New Zealand. It is home to Central Otago roundhead galaxias.
