= Paranui River =

Coordinates: 35°01′S 173°27′E

Location
- Country: New Zealand

Physical characteristics
- Source
  - location: Paranui Stream
  - elevation: 35 m (115 ft)
- Mouth
  - location: Taipā River
  - elevation: 0 m (0 ft)
- Length: 5 km (3.1 mi)

The Paranui River is a river of the Northland Region of New Zealand's North Island. It flows north from its sources around Paranui to reach the Taipā River 5 kilometres (3 mi) from Taipā.

The dictionary defines a river as a large natural stream. The Paranui is called a stream by the New Zealand Geographic Board, though it hasn't given it an official name, but the 1:50,000 map shows it as a river.
