= Awaroa River (Kaipara) =

Coordinates: 36.149°S 174.070°E

Location
- Country: New Zealand

Physical characteristics
- Mouth: Kaipara Harbour

The Awaroa River is a river in the Kaipara District of New Zealand.
