= Lake Hanlon =

Lake on the West Coast of New Zealand

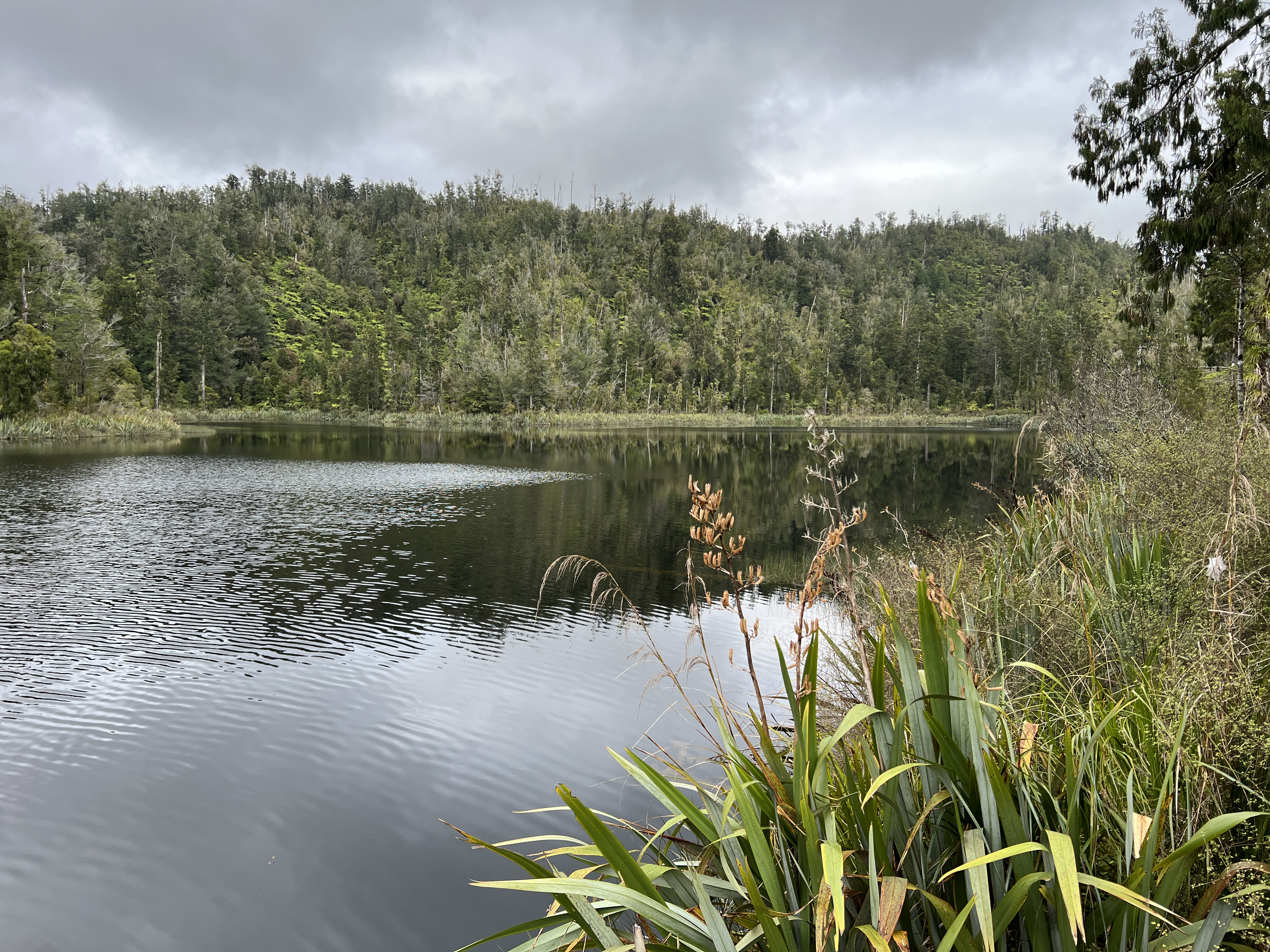
- Lake Hanlon in 2024

- Location within New Zealand
- Location: West Coast Region
- Coordinates: 41°25′30″S 172°06′09″E
- Primary inflows: Two unnamed streams
- Primary outflows: None known
- Basin countries: New Zealand
- Max. length: 1.096 km (0.681 mi)
- Max. width: 0.345 km (0.214 mi)
- Surface area: 12.4 ha (31 acres)
- Surface elevation: 70 m (230 ft)

Lake Hanlon is a 12.4-hectare (31-acre) lake on the West Coast of New Zealand's South Island, located 8 kilometres (5 mi) south of Little Wanganui.

== History ==
There is an oft-repeated story that Lake Hanlon was formed by the 1929 Murchison earthquake, but this is untrue. It was a well-recognised scenic attraction in the 1920s: as part of the development of the road north from Seddonville over the Karamea Bluffs, the Department of Tourism in 1924 was asked for £5 to develop a track to the lake and put up a roadside sign. In a 1928 report, "one may climb on foot by a special track 100 yards up to the top of a hill and discover beautiful Lake Hanlon, which has no superior on the Coast for reflections and echoes". Another pre-earthquake account calls it "a little jewel in a rich setting of birch and rimu bush, well worth the trouble of a visit."

In the 1929 earthquake the road was largely destroyed and access to the lake cut off. The existing outlet of the lake was cut off when both sides of the creek bed fell in, and a slip formed another lake in a depression nearby; there was concern that if this breached the settlement of Te Namu at the Little Wanganui River bridge could be flooded. However, in 1930 an aerial survey reported that "Lake Hanlon looks its old self from the air". By 1938 the lake was once again a tourist attraction, and a new track and signage was constructed.

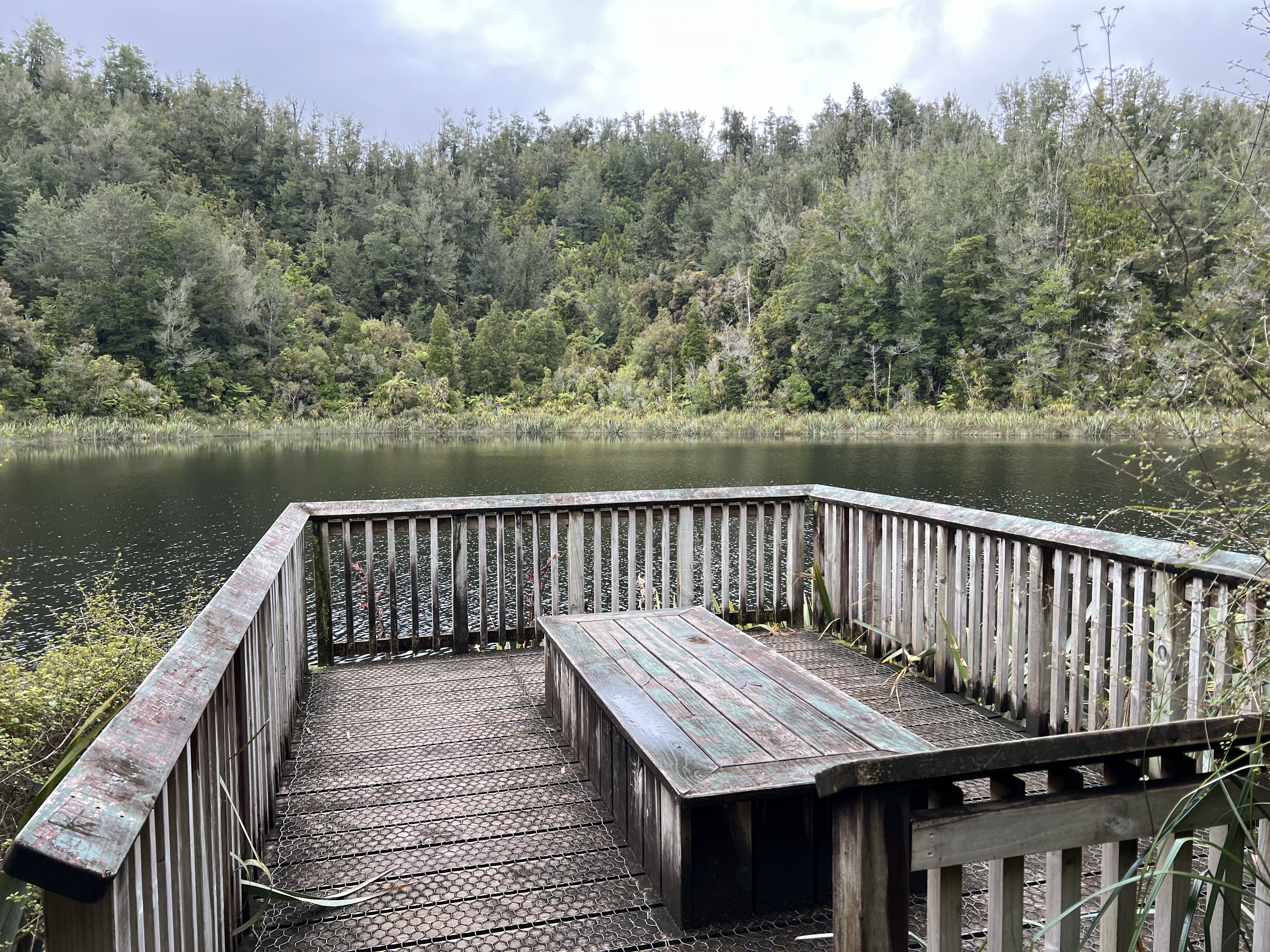
Viewing platform in Lake Hanlon

Currently a 750 m, 15-minute walk from a car park on State Highway 67, 8 km south of Little Wanganui, traverses a forested ridge to a viewing platform in the lake. A second track leads from the car park to the stream. The forest around the lake was gazetted as Lake Hanlon Amenity Area in 1998 by the Department of Conservation.

== Ecology ==
The slope from the road to the ridge comprises younger forest which has regrown after slips, and is composed mostly of kamahi (Pterophylla racemosa) and rimu. Lacebark (Hoheria), Coprosma rhamnoides, marble leaf (Carpodetus serratus), and mahoe (Melicytus ramiflorus) are also present.

The lake itself is surrounded by a ring of kahikatea (Dacrycarpus dacrydioides) forest, which backs onto southern beech (Nothofagus) interspersed with podocarps such as rimu (Dacrydium cupressinum) and Hall's tōtara (Podocarpus cunninghami) as well as southern rātā (Metrosideros umbellata). Both hard beech and red beech are present, as well as mountain toatoa (Phyllocladus alpinus), Quintinia serrata, and kiekie. The small-leaved shrub hukihuki (Coprosma tenuicaulis) grows beside the lake.

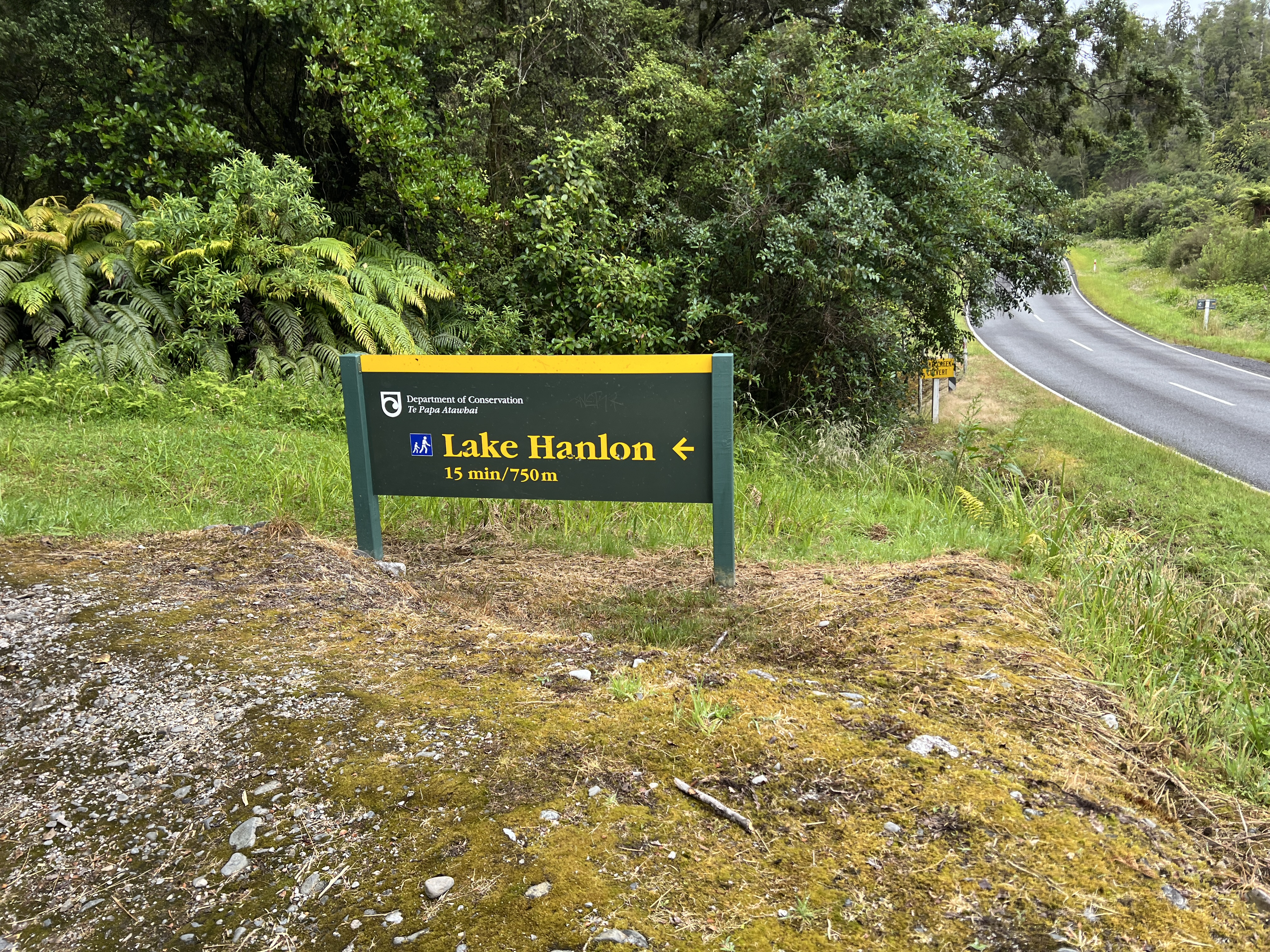
Track start

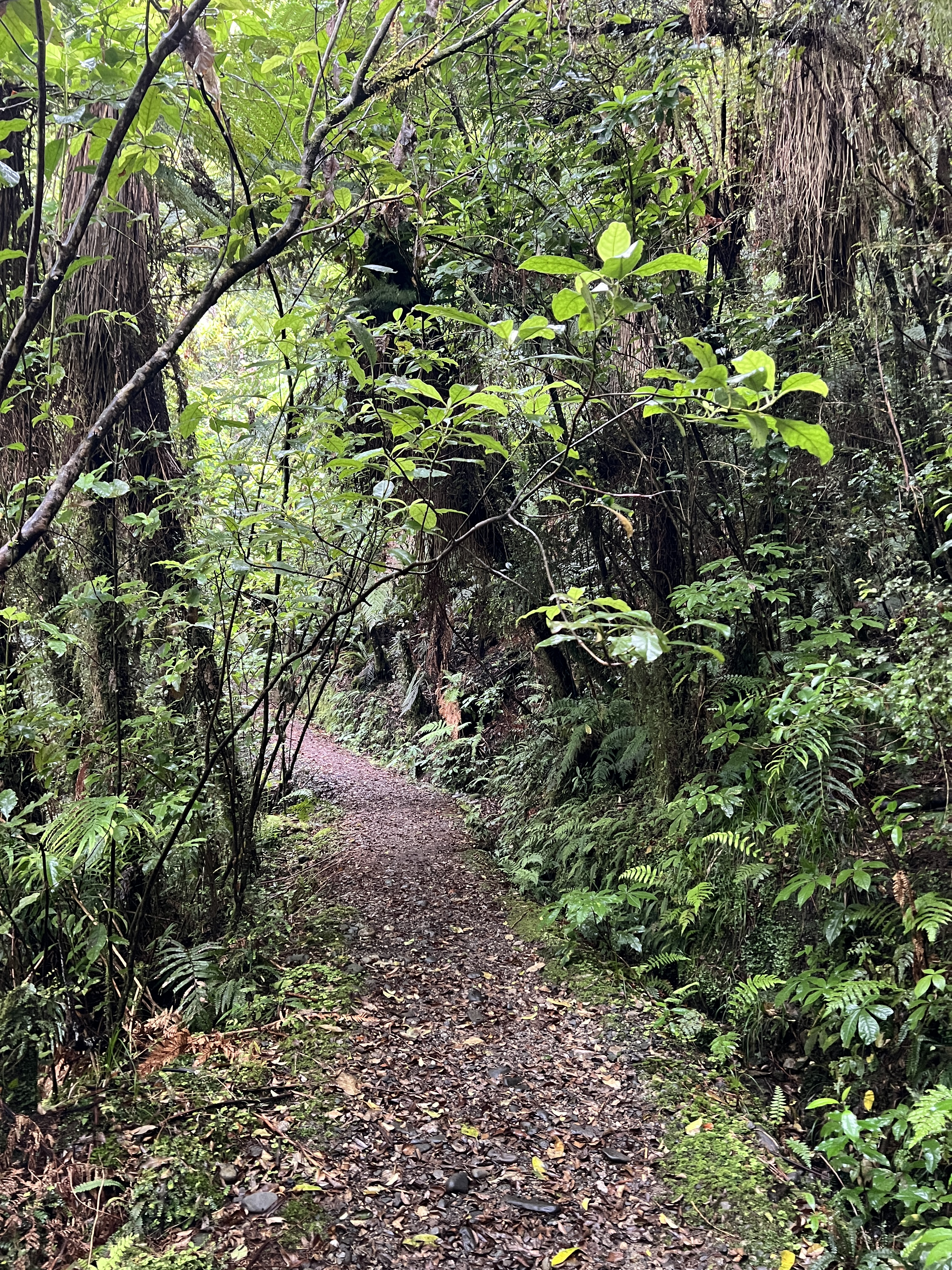
Path to the lake

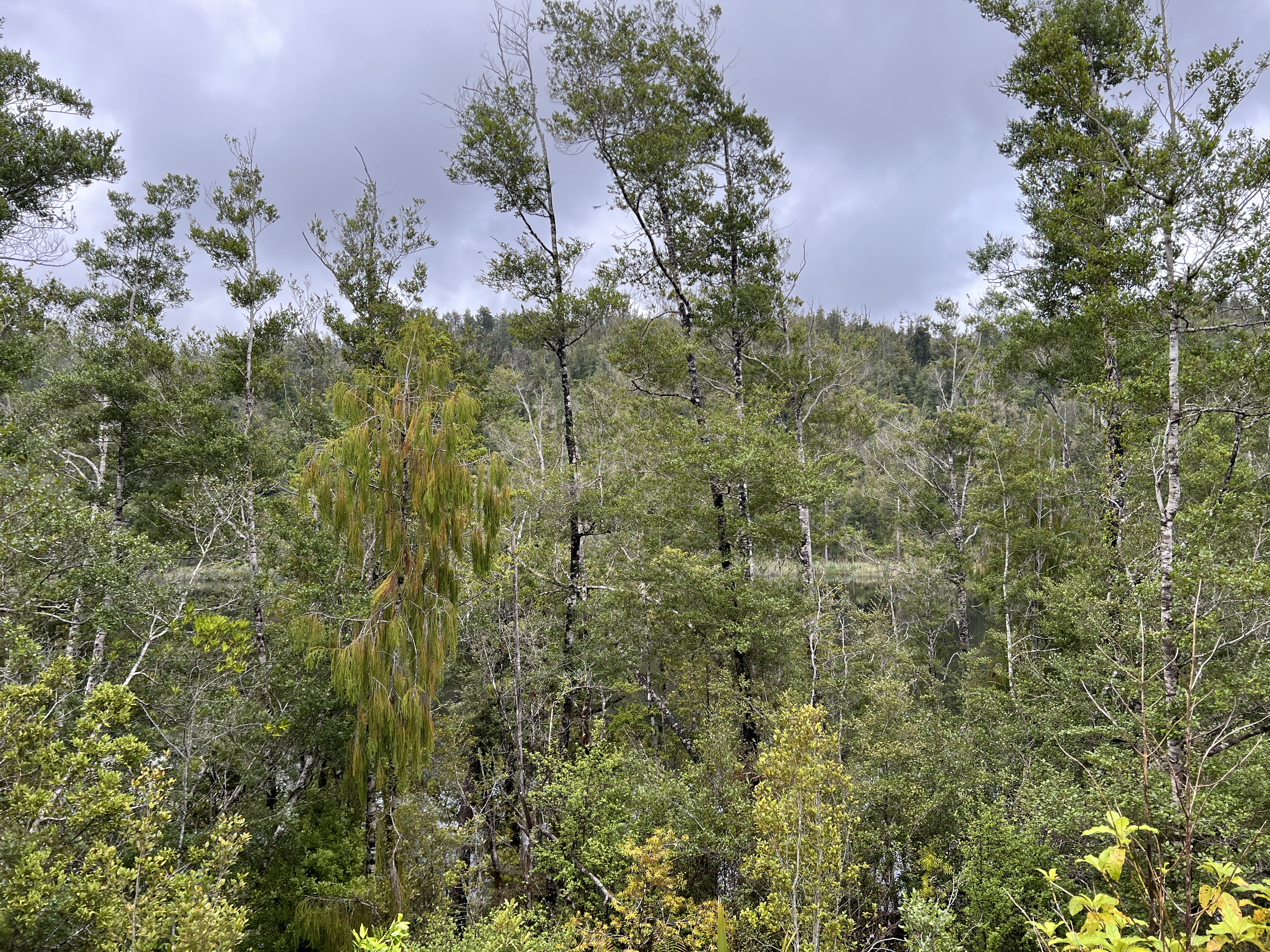
Forest by the lake

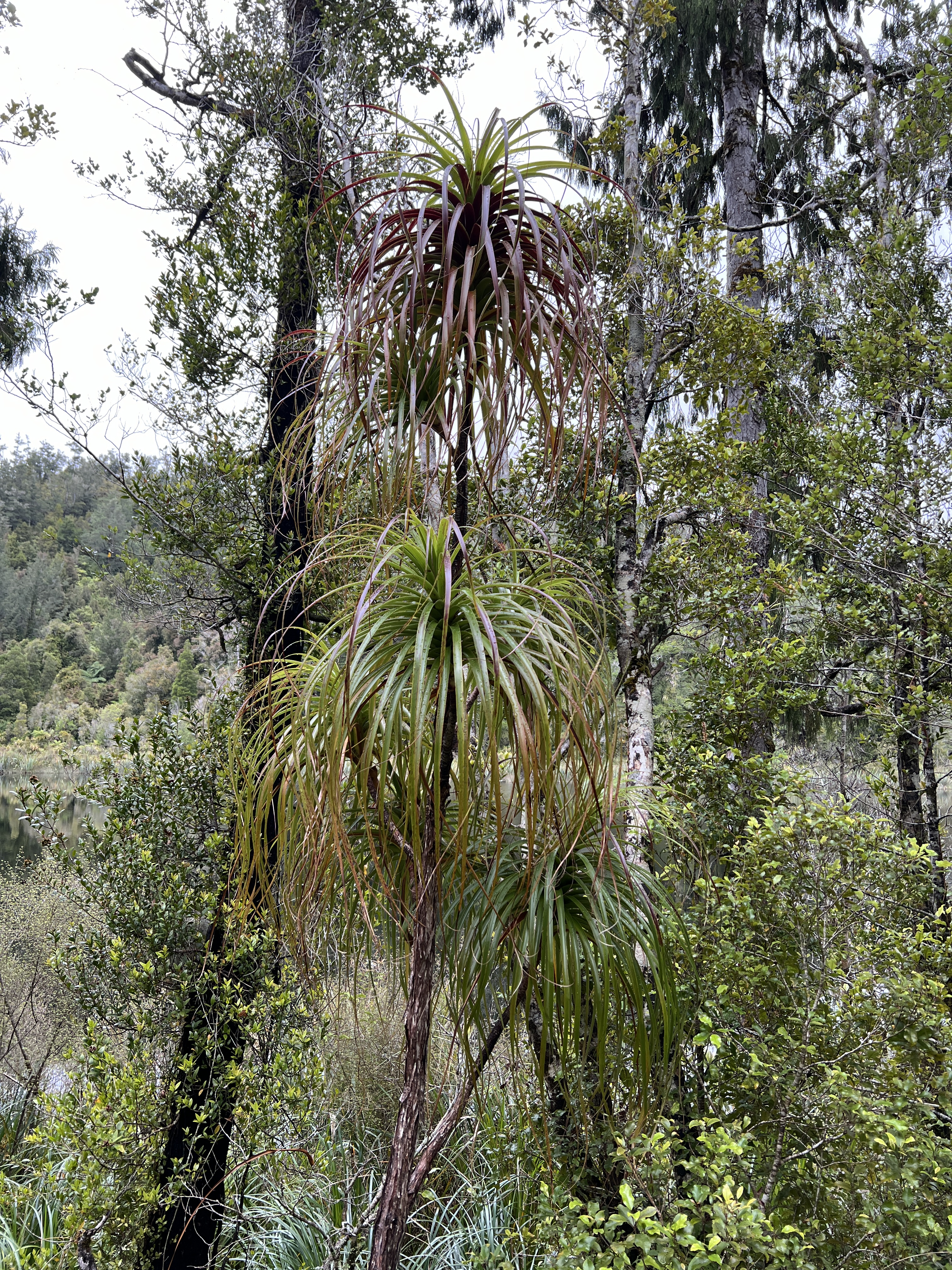
Mountain neinei

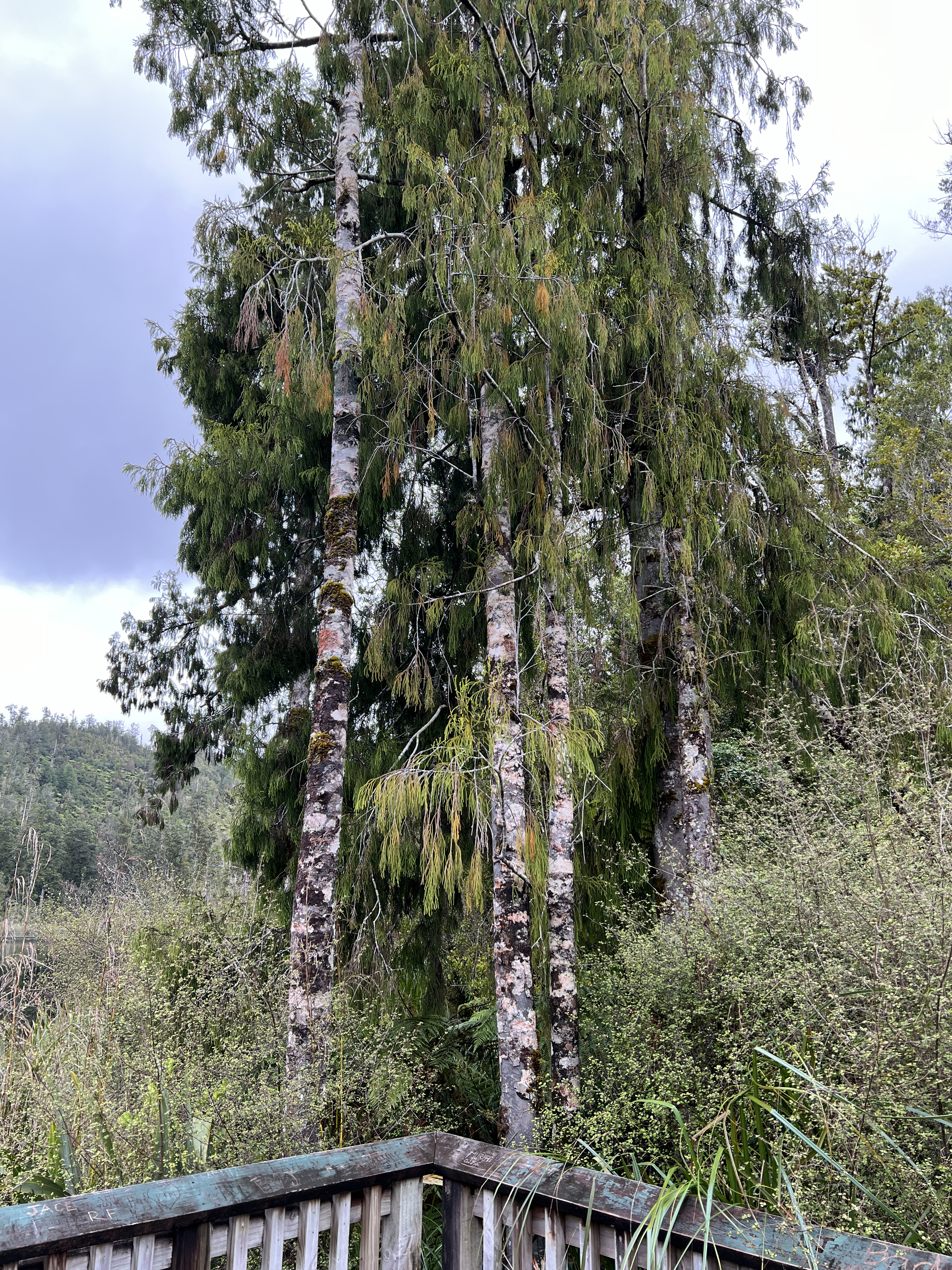
Kahikatea
