= Karamea Centennial Museum =

Museum in Karamea, New Zealand

Coordinates: 41°14′56.3″S 172°7′3.8″E

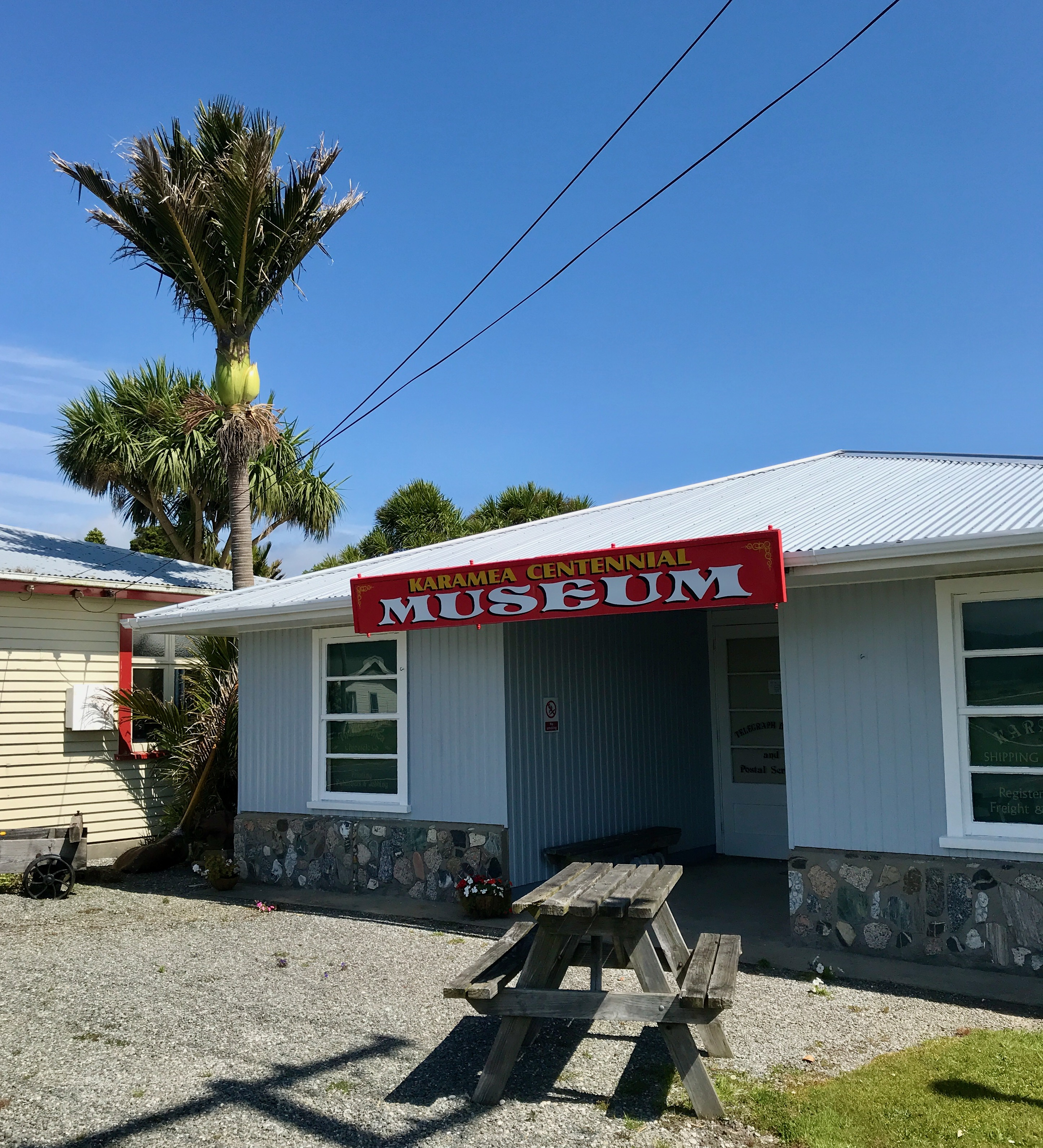
Karamea Centennial Museum in 2019

Karamea Centennial Museum is a museum in Karamea on the West Coast of the South Island of New Zealand.

== History ==
The museum was opened in 1974, for the centennial celebrations of the settlement.

== Collection ==
The museum collection includes photographs and exhibits on the local industries of sawmilling, dairying, gold mining, flax milling and shipping. It also contains district archives, material from local schools and family history material. The museum is run by the Karamea Historical Society Incorporated and staffed by local volunteers.
