= Umere =

Umere Land of Promise
- Locality
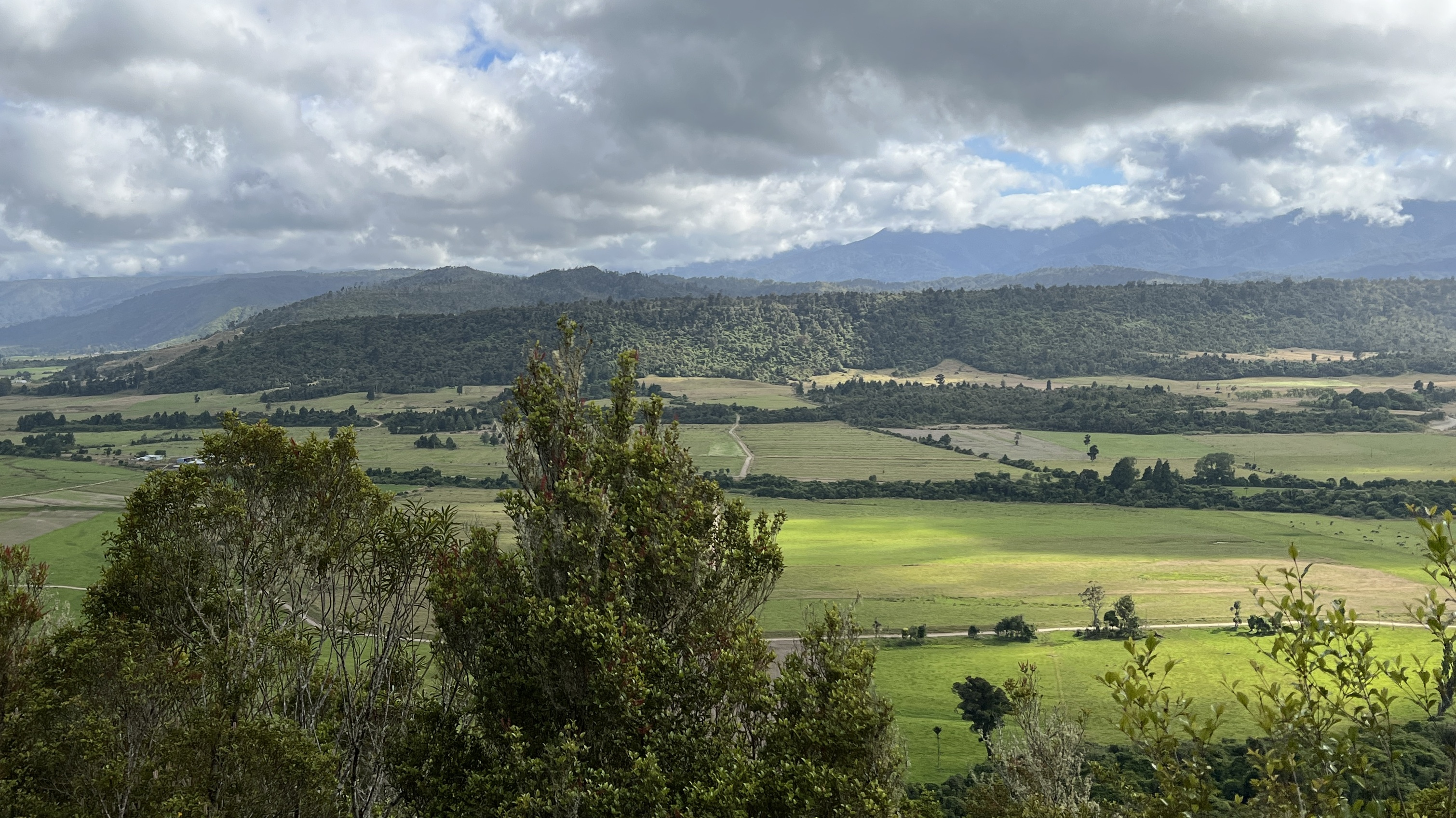
- Umere from the Zig Zag Track, South Terrace
- Etymology: chosen randomly
- Interactive map of Umere
- Coordinates: 41°15′40″S 172°10′23″E
- Country: New Zealand
- Region: West Coast
- District: Buller District
- Electorates: West Coast-Tasman; Te Tai Tonga

Population (2023)
  - Total: 144

Umere is a town in the Karamea area of New Zealand. Umere is a farming community on the north side of the Karamea River, upriver from the main Karamea township.

== Name ==
The settlement was originally named Land of Promise, in contrast with the slightly earlier settlement on the south bank of the Karamea River named Promised Land (later redubbed Arapito). The name was changed to Umere in 1912 when a post office and telephone bureau was established in the town. One account has it that the name was chosen at random from a dictionary of Māori words.

== History ==
The original "Special Settlement" of Karamea in 1875 was on the South Terrace, which although safe from floods had infertile soil and was worthless for agriculture. Local tradition holds that the King brothers were out searching for pigs that had strayed from the Terrace to the south side of the Karamea River, and discovered the fertile flats there. Edward King, who had worked on a Sutton's Seed Farm in England, cleared a patch and sowed seeds, which showed such progress that the settlers moved down from the Terrace to this "Promised Land"—aside from the Biblical reference, the settlers had been promised a further allotment of 5 acres from the Government. The name also refers to the "irritating delay" between applying for sections on this land and the final allotment. By the early 1880s the settlement had expanded and settlers had spread across the river to new farming country, which they dubbed the Land of Promise to distinguish it from the Promised Land.

Early attempts at agriculture in the Land of Promise included the planting of hops by Robert McNabb in the late 1880s. Others followed suit, hop kilns were built, and hop production continued until the Great War, slowly being displaced by dairying. A small cheese factory set up in 1917 persisted for a few years, but most farmers eventually supplied milk to the Dairy Company butter factory. In the 1890s a flour mill operated for a few years.

As early as 1892 the Land of Promise School was hosting religious services until the Holy Trinity Vurch was opened in Karamea in 1908. Teacher Bob Tunnicliff was a stalwart of the Umere rugby team, and a Buller representative 1922–28, playing for the All Blacks in 1923. Another Umere teacher, Mildred Cawley, introduced field hockey to the district in the 1920s.

== Demographics ==
Umere covers 22.72 km^{2} (8.77 sq mi). It is part of the Karamea rural settlement.

Historical population
Year	Pop.	±% p.a.
2006	135	—
2013	114	−2.39%
2018	111	−0.53%
2023	144	+5.34%

Umere had a population of 144 in the 2023 New Zealand census, an increase of 33 people (29.7%) since the 2018 census, and an increase of 30 people (26.3%) since the 2013 census. There were 78 males and 69 females in 81 dwellings. 4.2% of people identified as LGBTIQ+. The median age was 55.0 years (compared with 38.1 years nationally). There were 21 people (14.6%) aged under 15 years, 6 (4.2%) aged 15 to 29, 81 (56.2%) aged 30 to 64, and 36 (25.0%) aged 65 or older.

People could identify as more than one ethnicity. The results were 95.8% European (Pākehā); 4.2% Māori; 2.1% Pasifika; 2.1% Asian; and 2.1% Middle Eastern, Latin American and African New Zealanders (MELAA). English was spoken by 100.0%, Māori by 2.1%, and other languages by 6.2%. The percentage of people born overseas was 14.6, compared with 28.8% nationally.

Religious affiliations were 22.9% Christian, and 2.1% Hindu. People who answered that they had no religion were 62.5%, and 12.5% of people did not answer the census question.

Of those at least 15 years old, 18 (14.6%) people had a bachelor's or higher degree, 72 (58.5%) had a post-high school certificate or diploma, and 39 (31.7%) people exclusively held high school qualifications. The median income was $26,300, compared with $41,500 nationally. 6 people (4.9%) earned over $100,000 compared to 12.1% nationally. The employment status of those at least 15 was 36 (29.3%) full-time and 27 (22.0%) part-time.

== School ==
The first school building in the area was across the river in the Promised Land, but was destroyed by fire, and in 1884 a replacement was approved and built for £150. The Karamea School Committee complained that pupils were being drawn away from their school district, and the Land of Promise residents argued that the school should have been sited further upriver at a more convenient crossing. Pupils from Land of Promise crossed the river in canoes, and often missed a day of school when the river was impassable. In 1887 a school inspector was petitioned and £110 was allocated to a school building. The school was finished in 1889, and the first teacher, Susan Blane, appointed in 1890. The school roll varied between 19 and 22, later falling to 12–14. With declining rolls from dwindling population after WWI the school closed and from 1926 children attended Karamea School.

== Biology ==
A species of milk-cap mushroom, Lactarius umerensis, was collected in the area in January 1968 by Ross McNabb and named after Umere.
