= Karamea =

Town on the West Coast of the South Island of New Zealand

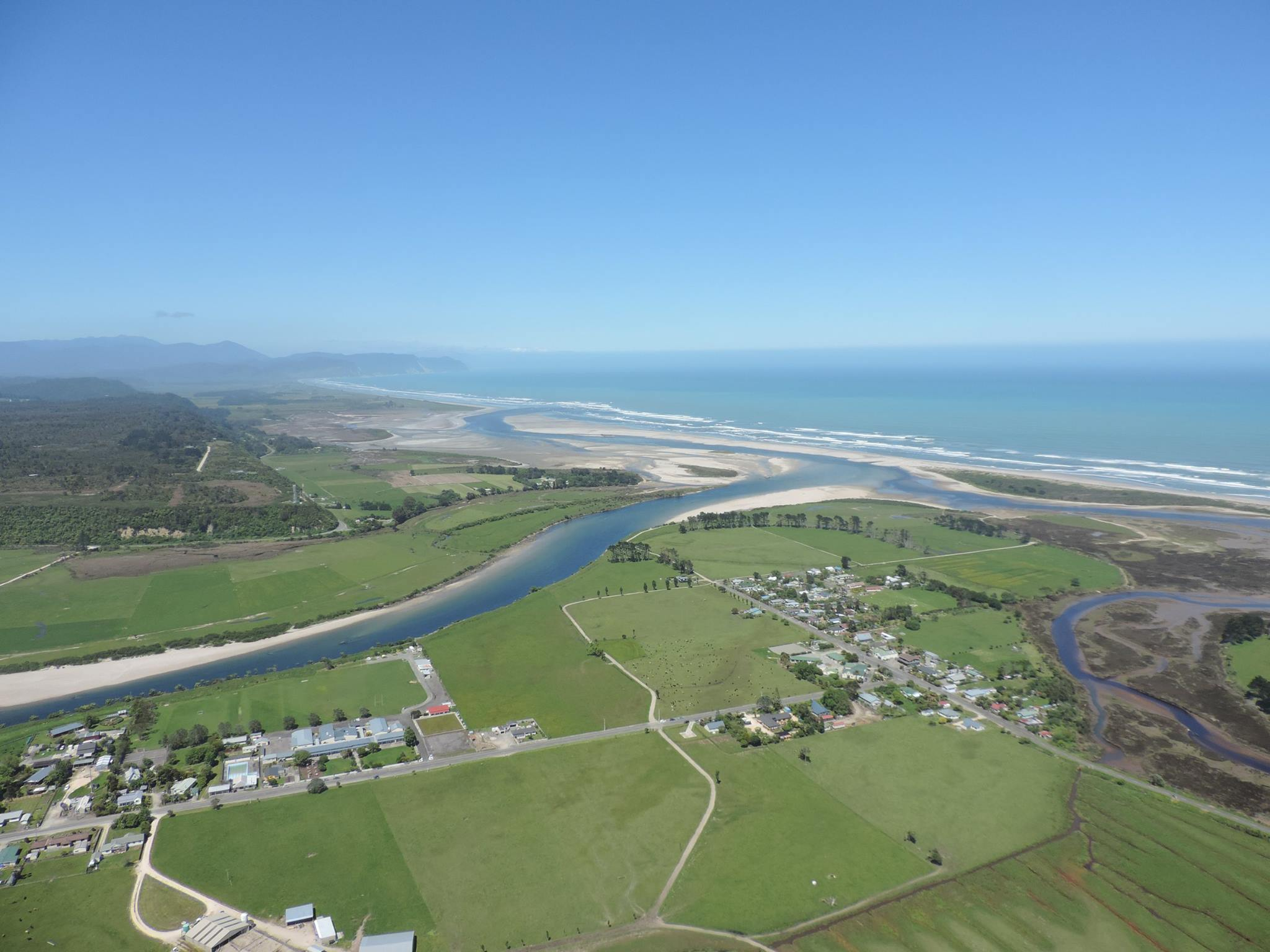
- Market Cross, Karamea, and the Ōtūmahana Estuary
- Interactive map of Karamea
- Country: New Zealand
- Region: West Coast Region
- District: Buller District
- Ward: Seddon
- Electorates: West Coast-Tasman; Te Tai Tonga

Government
  - Territorial Authority: Buller District Council
  - Regional council: West Coast Regional Council
  - Mayor of Buller: Chris Russell
  - West Coast-Tasman MP: Maureen Pugh
  - Te Tai Tonga MP: Tākuta Ferris

Area
  - Total: 66.08 km^{2} (25.51 sq mi)

Population (June 2025)
  - Total: 460
  - Density: 7.0/km^{2} (18/sq mi)

Karamea is a town on the West Coast of the South Island of New Zealand. It is the northernmost settlement of any real size on the West Coast, and is located 96 kilometres (60 mi) northeast by road from Westport. Apart from a narrow coastal strip, the town of Karamea and its local area are completely surrounded to the south, east and north by Kahurangi National Park.

The town is located on the coastal plain adjacent to the Karamea River and the Ōtūmahana Estuary. The town consists of two small settlements, Market Cross and Karamea proper, located about 1 kilometre (0.62 mi) apart. Up the Karamea River are the farming areas of Arapito (on the south bank) and Umere (on the north bank).

Karamea is a gateway to the Kahurangi National Park, and provides a base for visitors coming to walk or mountain bike the Heaphy Track, or see popular local attractions such as the Ōpārara Basin, Ōpārara Arches, the Fenian Track and caves, the Big Rimu Walk and the coastal scenery north of Kōhaihai on the Heaphy Track.

== Toponymy ==
The name Karamea is Māori – despite local jokes suggesting it was named by an Italian for his love – and is thought to either mean "red ochre" or be a corruption of Kakara taramea, "the smell of speargrass leaves." The name is used for the township and also for the surrounding area.

== History ==
Large shell middens have been found in the area. Radiocarbon dating indicates that these middens are associated with occupation in the period AD 1400 to AD 1600. The evidence suggests that the site was used by Māori as a temporary stopping place on the route down the coast to collect pounamu.

The mouth of the Heaphy River is the site of an early Māori encampment dating back to perhaps 1380 AD, and there is evidence it was one of the few sites in the northwest South Island occupied by people for extended periods of time. There is significant evidence of stoneworking, including local pounamu as well as argillite, obsidian, and chert imported from elsewhere in Aotearoa. The significance of the site to Ngāi Tahu led to it being excluded from Kahurangi National Park.

The first Europeans and Chinese would have been early gold-miners in the 1860s.

=== Special Settlement Area ===
In the early 1870s, the Nelson Provincial Government investigated the use of Special Settlement Areas as a way of developing remote parts of the province, and attracting immigrants. The conditions to be offered to immigrants included the offer of land on deferred payment terms, and the opportunity of partial employment by the Provincial Government for the first year after the immigrants arrived. The allotments of land would be between forty and two hundred acres to each head of family, and be open to those already in the Colony, as well as new immigrants. The Nelson Special Settlements Act was passed on 25 October 1872, to allow the scheme to proceed, but there were disputes with central government about allowing the scheme to extend to those already resident.

Prior to 1874, the Nelson Province had not been significantly involved in the immigration schemes organised by the Colonial Government, but in October of that year, around 250 adults arrived in Nelson seeking work, and another shipload of immigrants was on the way. There was insufficient work available to employ all these immigrants, and the province turned again to Special Settlement Areas as a solution. Karamea was chosen as a site for a Special Settlement Area partly because the area was already known from a gold rush 7 years earlier, but also that it had a harbour, and there were steamers passing regularly along the coast. By November 1874, a block of land of 4,000 acres (1,600 ha) had been reserved on the south side of the Karamea River, and in April 1875 a further 1,667 acres (675 ha) was reserved on the north side of the Karamea River . The planning of the settlement was placed under the control of Eugene O'Conor, Provincial Secretary, and member of the New Zealand House of Representatives.

The settlers at Karamea were mostly immigrants from four ships that arrived at Nelson between August 1874 and February 1875. The first settlers to arrive in Karamea were landed from the steamer Charles Edward, on 27 November 1874. Most of the 20 men who were landed had no experience of breaking in new land. They were initially allocated small sections of pakihi – flat boggy land with infertile, waterlogged soil high up on a terrace to the south of the Karamea River. Better land was found on the Karamea River flats below the terrace, but there were delays before this land was allocated. Women and children arrived in January 1875.

In October 1875, using labour from the settlers, work began on creating an inland track over the hills between Little Wanganui and Mohikinui to bypass the difficult and dangerous coastal track. The road to Karamea over the hilly section (known as the Karamea bluffs) north of Mokihinui, was not opened until 1916.

=== Murchison earthquake ===
The Murchison earthquake on 17 June 1929 caused severe damage in the Karamea area, with all roads in the district closed and nearly all bridges damaged. Houses were badly damaged, with no chimneys left standing, and some houses burnt down. The wharf and wharf sheds were also badly damaged. The road from Westport to Karamea was severely damaged by large landslides, and telephone lines were broken completely isolating the town. A party travelled on foot from Karamea to Westport to report the damage. The earthquake disrupted efforts underway at the time to control an outbreak of diphtheria in the settlement, and it was necessary for serum to be delivered by air. The earthquake caused the silting up of the harbour and cut the community's road link for about two years. The reconstruction of the road over the hilly section between Mokihinui and Little Wanganui required a workforce up to 400 men at times. Small coastal vessels were used to transport people and supplies between Westport and the Karamea harbour while the road was rebuilt.

=== Dairy farming ===
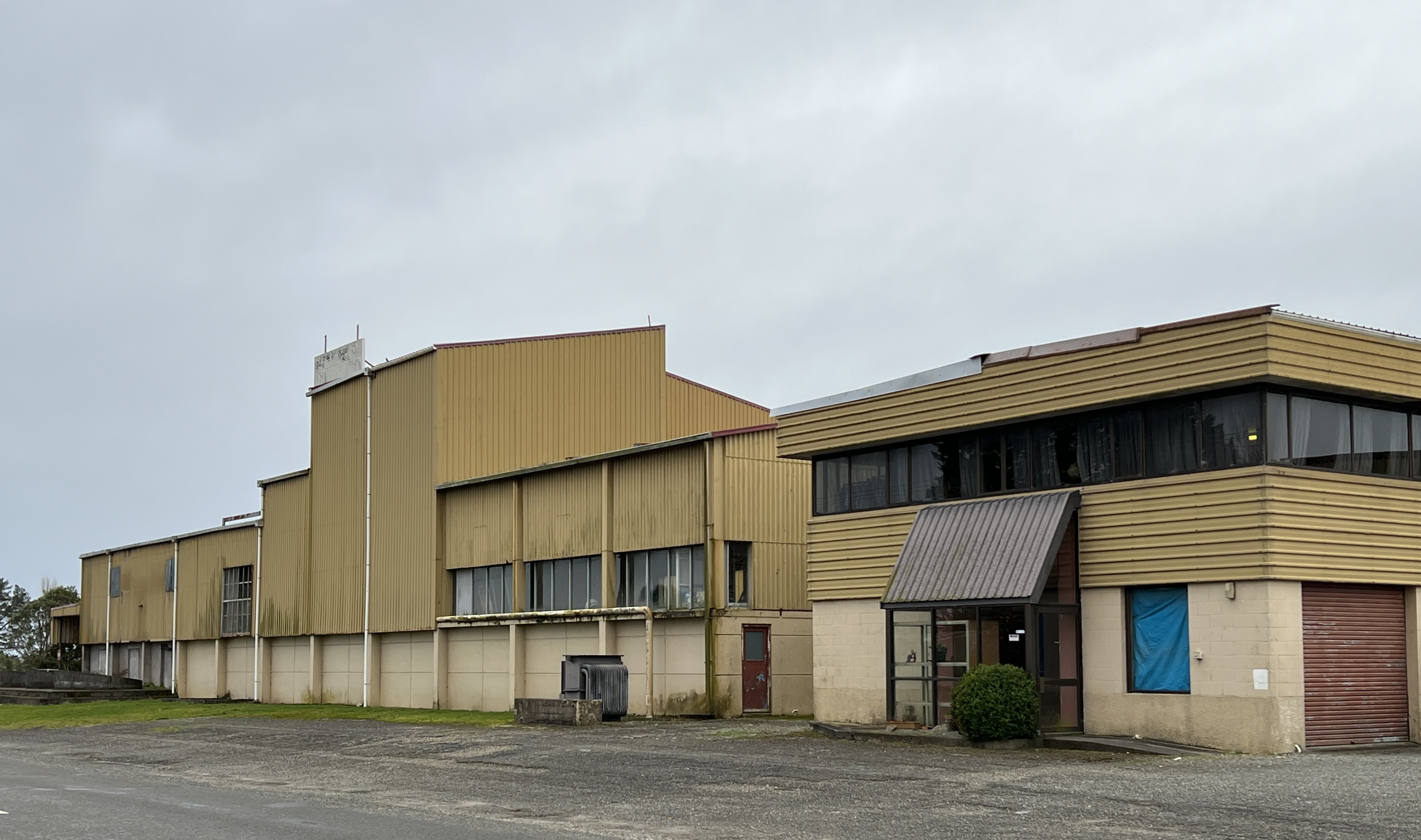
Former Karamea Co-operative Dairy factory

Dairy farming in the area began with the opening of the first Karamea Co-operative Dairy Company in 1893. This company struggled with payouts to farmers less than expectations and the venture was wound up in March 1897. There was no further progress until 1906, when J Curtin & Co opened a butter factory near the site of the 1893 plant. A newly formed Karamea Co-operative Dairy Company was established in 1911, to purchase the Curtin's factory. The new company received its first cream for processing on 20 September 1911. Approximately 40 tonnes was produced in the first year. There was no road out of Karamea at the time, so all the production had to be shipped on vessels that were capable of crossing the Karamea bar.

In 1935, the Karamea dairy factory was manufacturing 300 tonnes of butter annually. The industry slowly expanded, and milk powder was manufactured locally from the 1970s. Local processing eventually ceased, and milk is now transported by road tanker to Hokitika.

== Geography ==
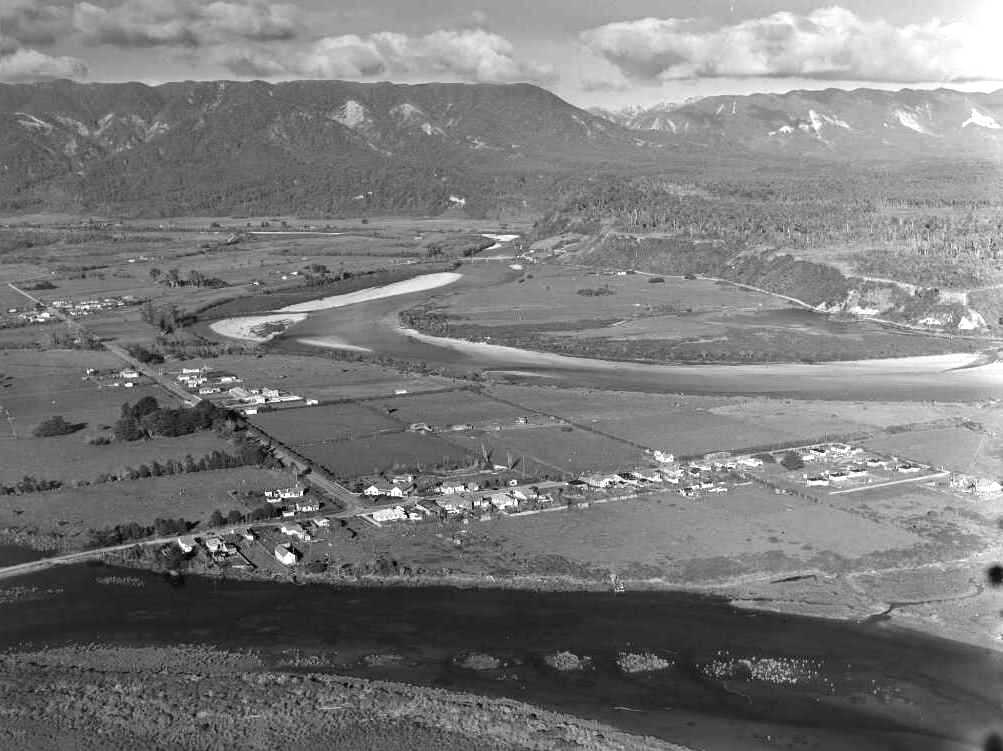
Aerial view of Karamea in 1951 (Karamea River in centre)

=== Setting ===
Karamea is 96 kilometres (60 mi) north of Westport on State Highway 67. The town is situated on a coastal plain adjacent to the mouth of the Karamea River and the Ōtūmahana Estuary in Karamea Bight, a large bay formed by the curve of coastline for 100 kilometres (62 mi) north from Cape Foulwind, to the Heaphy River. Apart from a narrow coastal strip, the town of Karamea and its local area are completely surrounded to the south, east and north by Kahurangi National Park.

There are two main areas of residential accommodation and businesses on the north side of the Karamea River. These are Market Cross and the settlement of Karamea itself. These two locations are around 1 kilometre (0.62 mi) apart. On the south side of the river, and 3 kilometres (1.9 mi) inland, is the small settlement of Arapito, and across the river from it is the settlement of Umere. These were originally called Promised Land and Land of Promise, respectively, when they were settled around 1880.

The mouth of the Ōpārara River is around 5 kilometres (3.1 mi) north of the centre of Karamea.

Little Wanganui is a small dairy farming village located 17 kilometres (11 mi) south of Karamea. It has a surfing beach and a river popular for whitebaiting and fishing.

=== Ōtūmahana estuary ===
There is a large estuary known as Ōtūmahana, at the mouth of the Karamea River. This estuary is also the mouth of Baker Creek and Granite Creek. The combined river mouths have formed a shallow mudflat and salt marsh estuary with an area of approximately 400 hectares (990 acres). This type of environment is vulnerable and is nationally uncommon. The estuary is an important feeding and breeding area for birds and fish.

The estuary is the third largest tidal estuary on the West Coast, after Ōkārito Lagoon and Saltwater Lagoon. It has been classified as a Significant Wetland by the West Coast Regional Council in its Regional Land and Water Plan. A small specially protected area of wetland known as Ōtūmahana Reserve was established at the south-east corner of the estuary in 1983.

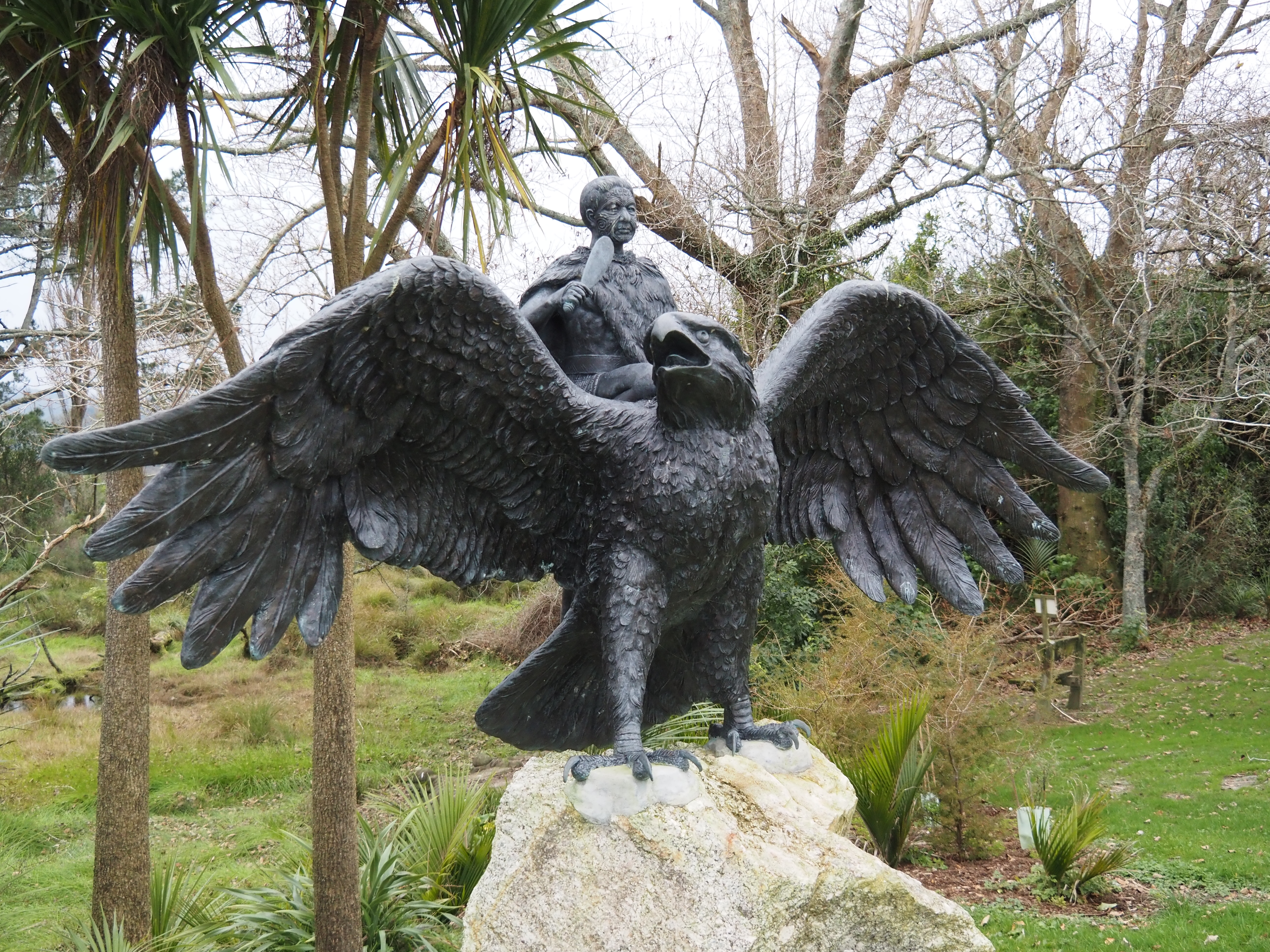
Te Maia Kahurangi, depicting Te Maia riding on the back of a hōkioi that he had raised

A life-size bronze statue of the extinct Haast's eagle or hōkioi was erected in Karamea in 2020. The initiative was a joint undertaking of the Karamea Estuary Enhancement Project and local iwi Ngāti Apa ki te Rā Tō and Ngāti Waewae. The hōkioi represents the spiritual guardian of the estuary. The statue is called Te Maia Kahurangi, and was unveiled on 22 February 2020. It depicts the ancestor Te Maia who rode an eagle he raised from a chick. It was cast in bronze by Gillie and Marc and is 300 cm high.

=== Karamea River ===
The Karamea River has a catchment area, including its tributaries, of 1,210 km^{2} (470 mi^{2}), representing around 23% of the entire area of Kahurangi National Park.

There is a history of the river causing flooding in the township. In 1899, a large flood swept away a new bridge across the river and caused damage to settlers homes, farms and crops. Another major flood caused serious damage in January 1915, inundating the main street and the majority of houses.

The Murchison earthquake on 17 June 1929 led to debris blocking the existing mouth of the Karamea River, and a new outlet to the sea formed from the Ōtūmahana lagoon around 1.6 kilometres (0.99 mi) to the south of the existing outlet. Deposits of silt raised the level of the river bed and led to a greatly increased risk of flooding in the townships of Karamea and Market Cross. On 30 December 1929 there was heavy damage in Karamea and Arapito from a sudden flood attributed to the breach of a dam created during the earthquake. In April 1931, floodwaters entered most of the homes around Market Cross, and some in the Karamea township. In August 1931, the settlers were given access to relief funding from the West Coast Earthquake Relief Fund for the damage caused by these floods.

Over the next few years, stop banks and training walls were constructed on the north side of the river to help mitigate the flood risk to the town. In May 1936 the Karamea School Committee notified the Education Board of their concerns about the damage caused by repeated flooding of the school. Relocation to a new site was proposed. In October 1936 there was a further major flood that entered 40 houses in Karamea and Market Cross. In September 1937, a large flood led to the river breaking through to the sea at the location of the old river mouth, cutting a new channel that greatly reduced the flood risk to the town and enabled the entry of vessels at high tide. Further river protection works were installed between 1938 and 1940, and these successfully defended the township during a heavy flood in the river in February 1940.

Survey records since 1912 indicate that there have been either single or double openings to the sea from the Ōtūmahana Estuary, and that these openings have migrated over 4.5 kilometres (2.8 mi) of shoreline since records began. Between 2008 and 2010, the two openings merged at a location giving a direct exit from the Karamea River to the sea. From December 2010, the combined opening migrated south. Between 2013 and 2015, the channel moved further south by over 2 kilometres (1.2 mi). In 2016, the channel was 3 kilometres (1.9 mi) south of the most direct route from the river to the sea. This southern location of the channel increases the risk of flooding in some areas of Karamea. A report to the West Coast Regional Council in 2016 recommended mechanical excavation of a breach channel to allow the next major flood to cut a new direct route to the sea, and mitigate the flood risk. Breach channels were constructed at the north end of the spit and a direct path was opened to the sea in 2017. The Regional Council cautioned that further interventions could be required in future to keep the outlet in a northern location.

=== Environmental restoration ===
In July 2020, the West Coast Regional council secured funding to support Clean Streams Karamea, a locally based not-for-profit environmental group. The funding will enable the raising and planting of 315,000 trees along 80 kilometres (50 mi) of riparian margins of waterways through farms. The project is expected to take 3–5 years.

=== Climate ===
Climate data for Arapito, 3 m (4km SE of Karamea, 1991–2020)
Month	Jan	Feb	Mar	Apr	May	Jun	Jul	Aug	Sep	Oct	Nov	Dec	Year
Record high °C (°F)	33.0 (91.4)	29.2 (84.6)	30.2 (86.4)	26.0 (78.8)	24.5 (76.1)	20.3 (68.5)	19.4 (66.9)	19.3 (66.7)	20.7 (69.3)	23.9 (75.0)	25.8 (78.4)	28.0 (82.4)	33.0 (91.4)
Mean daily maximum °C (°F)	21.0 (69.8)	21.6 (70.9)	20.4 (68.7)	18.1 (64.6)	15.9 (60.6)	13.4 (56.1)	12.9 (55.2)	13.6 (56.5)	14.8 (58.6)	16.0 (60.8)	17.4 (63.3)	19.5 (67.1)	17.1 (62.8)
Daily mean °C (°F)	16.3 (61.3)	16.7 (62.1)	15.3 (59.5)	13.2 (55.8)	11.2 (52.2)	8.9 (48.0)	8.2 (46.8)	9.0 (48.2)	10.3 (50.5)	11.7 (53.1)	13.0 (55.4)	15.2 (59.4)	12.4 (54.3)
Mean daily minimum °C (°F)	11.7 (53.1)	11.8 (53.2)	10.3 (50.5)	8.4 (47.1)	6.5 (43.7)	4.5 (40.1)	3.4 (38.1)	4.4 (39.9)	5.9 (42.6)	7.4 (45.3)	8.7 (47.7)	10.9 (51.6)	7.8 (46.0)
Record low °C (°F)	3.8 (38.8)	3.8 (38.8)	1.5 (34.7)	1.0 (33.8)	−2.4 (27.7)	−4.0 (24.8)	−3.1 (26.4)	−4.0 (24.8)	−2.1 (28.2)	−0.8 (30.6)	2.3 (36.1)	4.0 (39.2)	−4.0 (24.8)
Average rainfall mm (inches)	177.3 (6.98)	127.1 (5.00)	146.5 (5.77)	175.1 (6.89)	196.7 (7.74)	199.3 (7.85)	183.4 (7.22)	185.9 (7.32)	212.4 (8.36)	239.2 (9.42)	190.2 (7.49)	211.4 (8.32)	2,244.5 (88.37)
Mean monthly sunshine hours	210.3	183.4	187.5	155.7	126.7	104.1	119.6	141.7	141.7	157.5	172.4	180.1	1,880.7
Source: NIWA

== Demographics ==
Stats NZ describes Karamea town as a rural settlement which covers 66.08 km^{2} (25.51 sq mi). It includes Arapito and Umere. It had an estimated population of 460 as of June 2025, with a population density of 7.0 people per km^{2}. The town is part of the larger Karamea statistical area.

Historical population for Karamea town
Year	Pop.	±% p.a.
2006	423	—
2013	378	−1.59%
2018	357	−1.14%
2023	444	+4.46%

Karamea had a population of 444 in the 2023 New Zealand census, an increase of 87 people (24.4%) since the 2018 census, and an increase of 66 people (17.5%) since the 2013 census. There were 231 males and 213 females in 234 dwellings. 3.4% of people identified as LGBTIQ+. The median age was 54.3 years (compared with 38.1 years nationally). There were 60 people (13.5%) aged under 15 years, 33 (7.4%) aged 15 to 29, 225 (50.7%) aged 30 to 64, and 126 (28.4%) aged 65 or older.

People could identify as more than one ethnicity. The results were 94.6% European (Pākehā); 8.1% Māori; 2.7% Pasifika; 2.0% Asian; 0.7% Middle Eastern, Latin American and African New Zealanders (MELAA); and 3.4% other, which includes people giving their ethnicity as "New Zealander". English was spoken by 98.0%, Māori by 1.4%, and other languages by 8.1%. No language could be spoken by 0.7% (e.g. too young to talk). New Zealand Sign Language was known by 0.7%. The percentage of people born overseas was 19.6, compared with 28.8% nationally.

Religious affiliations were 23.6% Christian, 0.7% Hindu, 1.4% New Age, and 0.7% other religions. People who answered that they had no religion were 62.2%, and 10.8% of people did not answer the census question.

Of those at least 15 years old, 63 (16.4%) people had a bachelor's or higher degree, 213 (55.5%) had a post-high school certificate or diploma, and 117 (30.5%) people exclusively held high school qualifications. The median income was $25,800, compared with $41,500 nationally. 21 people (5.5%) earned over $100,000 compared to 12.1% nationally. The employment status of those at least 15 was 111 (28.9%) full-time, 96 (25.0%) part-time, and 9 (2.3%) unemployed.

=== Karamea statistical area ===
Karamea statistical area, which includes Little Wanganui, Mokihinui, Summerlea and Seddonville, covers 3,129.18 km^{2} (1,208.18 sq mi) and had an estimated population of 940 as of June 2025, with a population density of 0.30 people per km^{2}.

Historical population for Karamea statistical area
Year	Pop.	±% p.a.
2006	798	—
2013	768	−0.55%
2018	714	−1.45%
2023	909	+4.95%

The statistical area had a population of 909 in the 2023 New Zealand census, an increase of 195 people (27.3%) since the 2018 census, and an increase of 141 people (18.4%) since the 2013 census. There were 474 males, 429 females, and 6 people of other genders in 468 dwellings. 3.3% of people identified as LGBTIQ+. The median age was 55.8 years (compared with 38.1 years nationally). There were 123 people (13.5%) aged under 15 years, 63 (6.9%) aged 15 to 29, 468 (51.5%) aged 30 to 64, and 255 (28.1%) aged 65 or older.

People could identify as more than one ethnicity. The results were 93.7% European (Pākehā); 10.9% Māori; 3.0% Pasifika; 1.3% Asian; 0.7% Middle Eastern, Latin American and African New Zealanders (MELAA); and 5.0% other, which includes people giving their ethnicity as "New Zealander". English was spoken by 98.7%, Māori by 1.7%, and other languages by 5.9%. No language could be spoken by 1.3% (e.g. too young to talk). New Zealand Sign Language was known by 0.7%. The percentage of people born overseas was 18.2, compared with 28.8% nationally.

Religious affiliations were 21.8% Christian, 0.3% Hindu, 0.3% Māori religious beliefs, 0.3% Buddhist, 1.0% New Age, and 2.0% other religions. People who answered that they had no religion were 64.0%, and 10.2% of people did not answer the census question.

Of those at least 15 years old, 111 (14.1%) people had a bachelor's or higher degree, 432 (55.0%) had a post-high school certificate or diploma, and 246 (31.3%) people exclusively held high school qualifications. The median income was $25,900, compared with $41,500 nationally. 39 people (5.0%) earned over $100,000 compared to 12.1% nationally. The employment status of those at least 15 was 240 (30.5%) full-time, 162 (20.6%) part-time, and 18 (2.3%) unemployed.

== Economy ==
In 2020, it was reported that Karamea had a GDP of $26.8m, with 199 jobs in 111 businesses. Dairy farming and tourism are the main economic drivers, and the service industry employs approximately a quarter of the workforce. Other former industries in the area include sphagnum moss, possum control, fishing, and fine furniture production. Horticultural tomato growers and a plant nursery also provide income. Fruit grown in the area includes tamarillo, which can be grown here due to the area's mild and frost-free microclimate.

In 2020, it was reported that there had been a significant increase in the local population, with increasing demand for housing, and an increase in the roll at Karamea Area School.

== Attractions ==
Tourists visit Karamea all year round to enjoy the many scenic attractions in the region, including Kahurangi National Park. Tourism is a fast-growing segment of the local economy, and the region has been said to be "New Zealand's best-kept secret".

=== Walking tracks ===
The southern end of the Heaphy Track, one of New Zealand's nine "Great Walks", is at the Kōhaihai River, about 20 kilometres (12 mi) north of Karamea. The western end of the Wangapeka Track is near Little Wanganui, around 18 kilometres (11 mi) south of Karamea.

Popular attractions in the area include the Ōpārara Basin, (including the Ōpārara Basin Arches), Honeycomb Hill Cave, Fenian Track and caves, and the Big Rimu Walk.

=== Mountain biking ===
Karamea provides a base for transport and accommodation for visitors coming to the area for mountain biking. Prior to the establishment of Kahurangi National Park in 1996, mountain biking was a popular activity on the Heaphy Track. In the final 12 months before the North West Nelson Forest Park became a National Park, around 2,000 mountain bikers completed the route. At the time, the National Parks Act 1980 did not permit mountain biking in National Parks, other than on formed roads. Lobbying activities to allow the return of mountain biking on the Heaphy Track continued through until 2011, when a three-year trial began. The trial permitted mountain biking during the winter season from 1 May to 30 September. The mountain bike trial period ended in 2016 and mountain biking became a permanent option over the colder part of the year. Mountain biking the Heaphy Track is now allowed each year from 1 May to 30 November for groups not exceeding six riders.

== Transport ==
Karamea is 96 kilometres (60 mi) north of Westport on State Highway 67. There is no other connecting road to the town – the road north ends at the Kōhaihai River some 20 kilometres (12 mi) from Karamea, at the southwestern end of the Heaphy Track. As at 2018, the road to Karamea was funded by Waka Kotahi via a special purpose road funding category, but the agency signalled that this funding category could end by 2024.

Air transport is available from Karamea Aerodrome. Golden Bay Air flies from Karamea to from Wellington, Takaka and Nelson. There is also a helicopter charter service at the aerodrome.

== Amenities ==
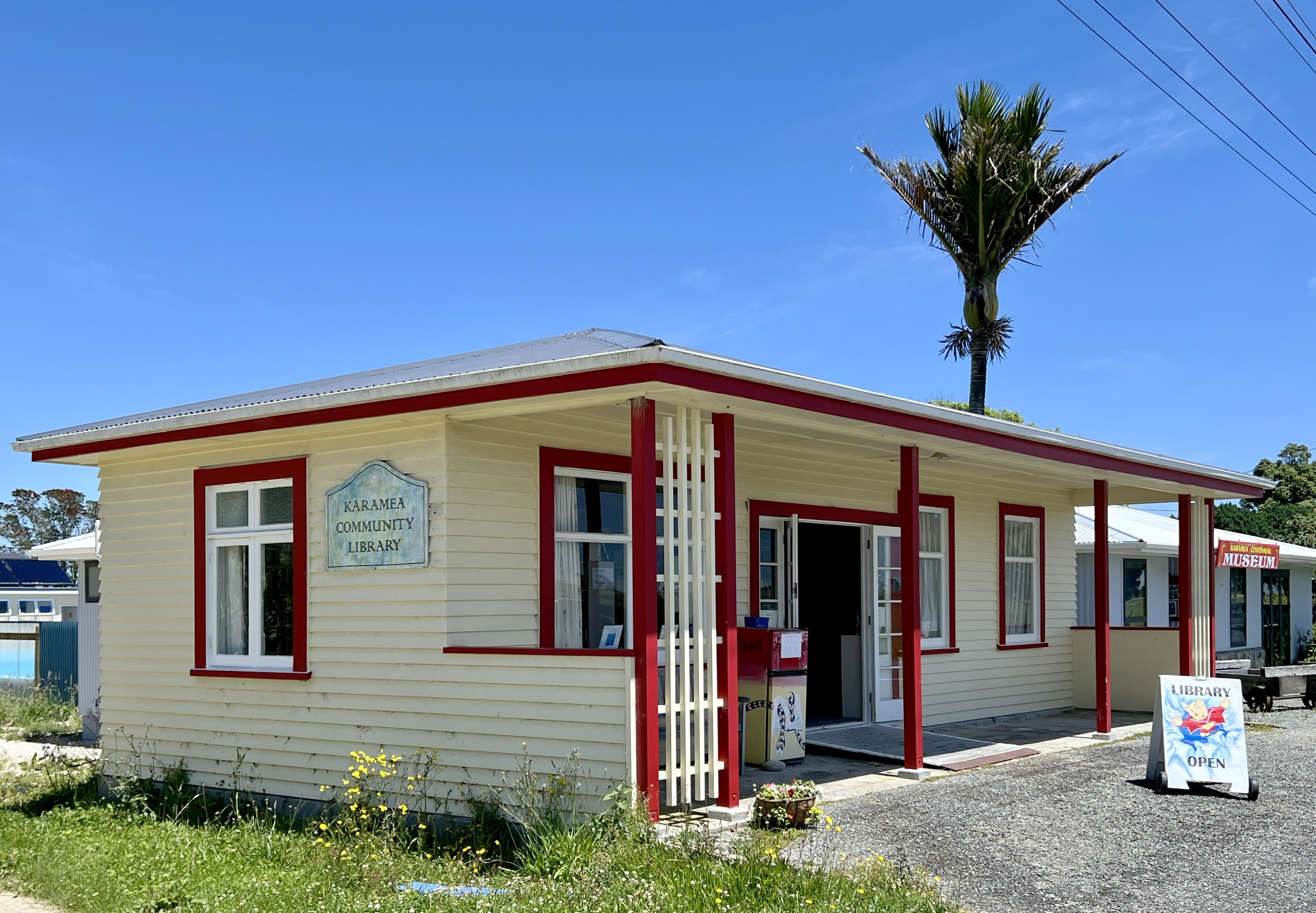
Karamea War Memorial Library

Karamea township offers local services including a general store, supermarket, petrol pumps, information centre, cafe, hotel, camping ground, motels, backpackers, art & craft shop, and a community library.

The Karamea War Memorial Library was opened in 1954 and for decades shared its building with the Plunket rooms. It expanded to occupy the whole building in the mid-1990s, and now operates as an entirely volunteer-run library with approximately 50 subscriptions.

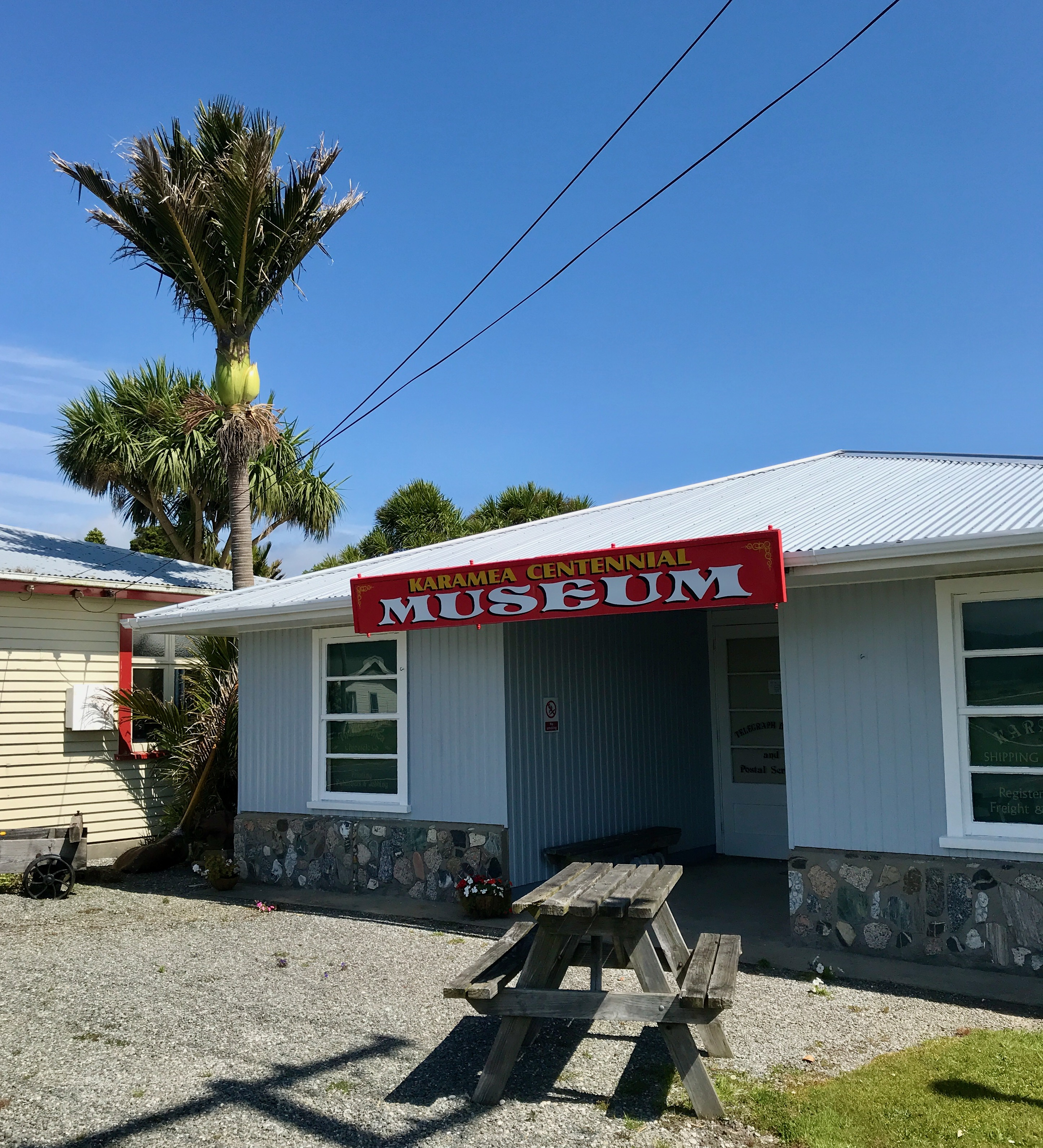
Karamea Centennial Museum

The Karamea Centennial Museum is a small museum opened in 1974. The museum collections include photographs and exhibits on the local industries of sawmilling, dairying, gold mining, flax milling and shipping.

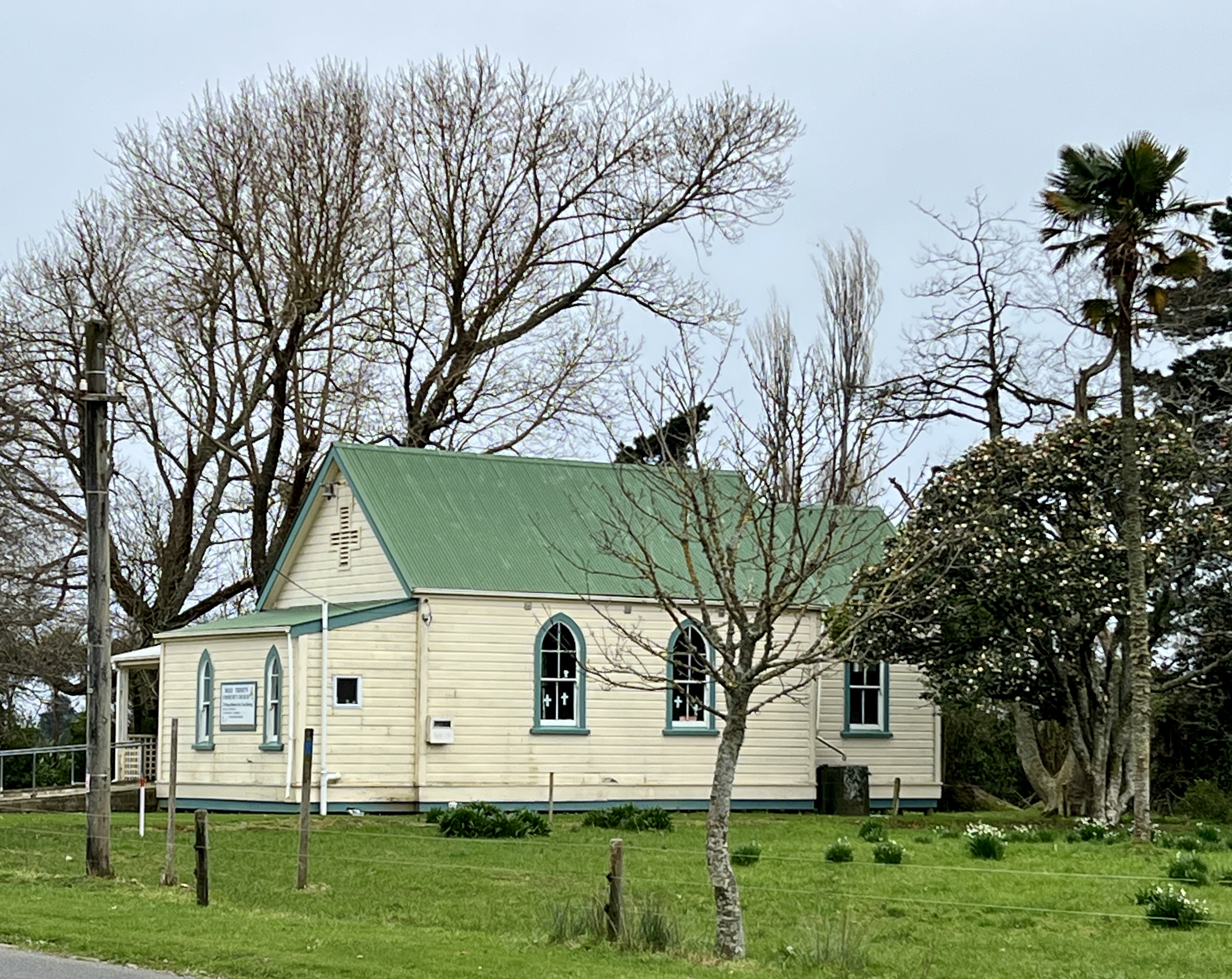
Holy Trinity Church

Until 1908 there was no church in Karamea; services were conducted in private homes, and a minister would visit from Westport or Mokihinui, often having to take an arduous coastal route along beaches and rocks. After the death by drowning in August 1906 of the crew of the Rangi while taking soundings on the Karamea Bar, the Westport vicar Rev Dart held services. He suggested locals might like to acquire a memorial, such as an organ, but the people of Karamea organised the construction of a church, taking three months and costing £69. The Holy Trinity Church was dedicated on 24 June 1908, and has stayed an interdenonominational community church ever since.

== Education ==
Karamea Area School is a coeducational composite school (years 1–13), with a roll of 96 as of July 2026. The Ministry of Education classifies the school amongst the four most isolated schools in the country. The school officially opened in 1878, with education provided in cottages since about 1875. In 1926, it became Karamea District High School (KDHS). A rebuild costing $11m was underway in 2020. The project won the top award in the Education category in the Te Kāhui Whaihanga New Zealand Institute of Architecture 2023 Nelson and Marlborough Architecture Awards.

Umere School opened in 1890 and merged to Karamea School in 1926. Oparara School began informally in 1897 and was under the jurisdiction of the Education Board in 1899. It merged to Karamea in 1939, with the school building moved to Karamea School in 1957 to be used as a theatre. Arapito (or Promised Land) School opened informally in 1882, and became official in 1884. It merged to Karamea District High in 1947 and its building became part of KDHS's manual training block. Kongahu School opened in 1894 and merged with KDHS in 1947. Its building also became part of teh manual training block. Little Wanganui School opened in 1894 and merged to KDHS in 1946.

== Notable people ==
Notable people from Karamea include:

- Atholl Anderson (1943–present), archaeologist, was assistant principal of Karamea Area School 1968–1970
- Sophia Anstice (1849–1926), dressmaker, draper and businesswoman, lived in Karamea 1874–1878 and started her dressmaking business there
- Anna Harrison (1983–present), netball player, raised in Karamea
- Owen Jennings (1945/46–present) Member of Parliament from 1996 to 2002, former President of New Zealand Federated Farmers

== Sources ==
- Mary Tunnicliff (1961), Karamea Co-operative Dairy Company Limited, Golden Jubilee 1911-1961, Karamea: Karamea Co-operative Dairy Company Limited, OCLC 153579873, Wikidata Q113191624
- Dulcie Harmon (2007). Karamea: A Story of Success. Karamea District Centennial 1874–1974. Westport: Buller Printing.
