= Arapito =

Arapito Promised Land
- Locality
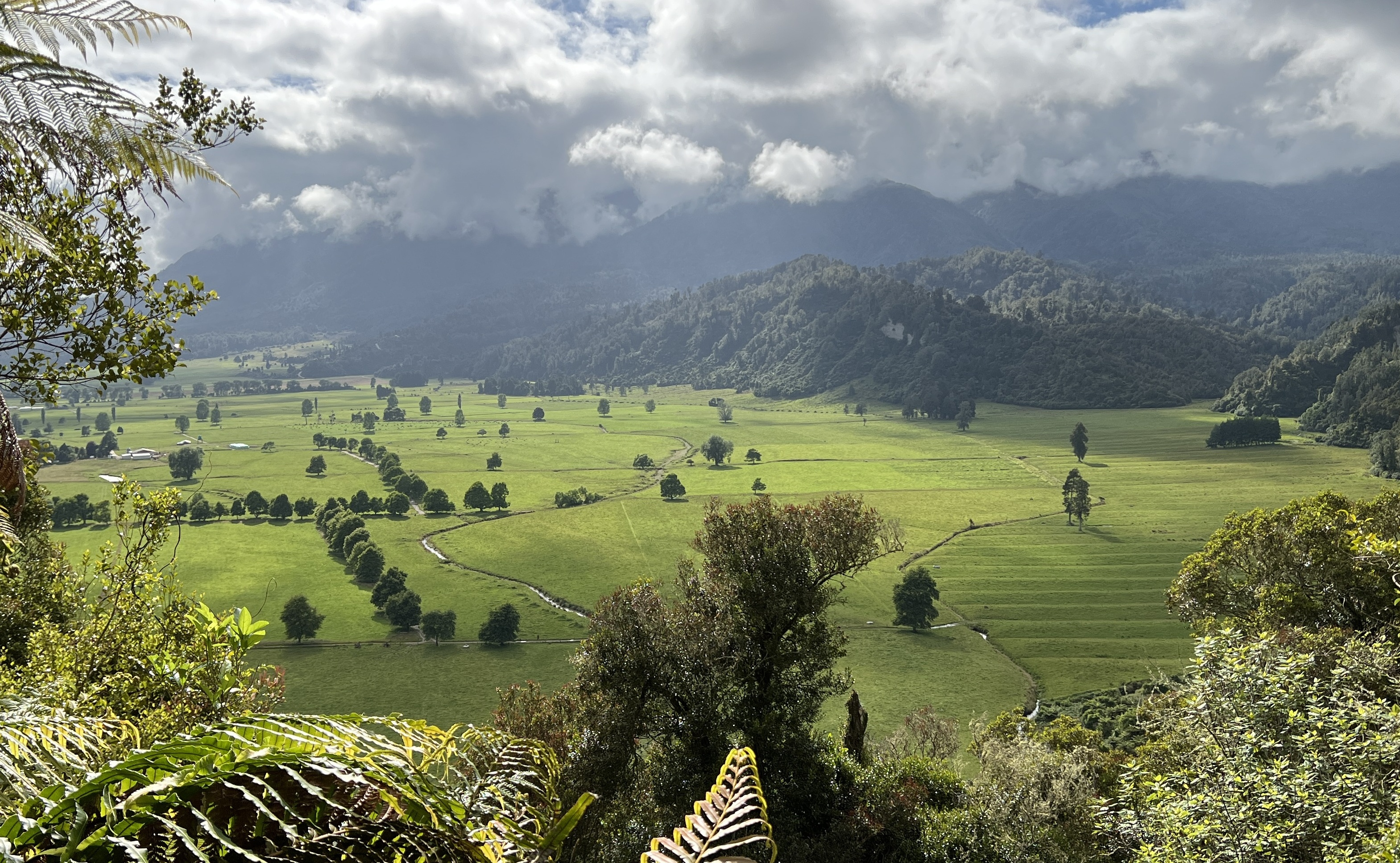
- Arapito from the Zig Zag Track, South Terrace

- Location within South Island
- Coordinates: 41°16′S 172°10′E
- Country: New Zealand
- Region: West Coast
- District: Buller District
- Electorates: West Coast-Tasman; Te Tai Tonga

Arapito is a town in the Karamea area of New Zealand. Arapito is a farming community on the south side of the Karamea River, upriver from the main Karamea township.

== Name ==
The settlement was originally named Promised Land; confusingly, the settlement on the opposite, north bank of the Karamea River was named Land of Promise (later redubbed Umere). The name was changed to Arapito (Māori: 'End of the path') in 1909 when a post office and telephone bureau was established in the town. The area was originally a Māori hunting trail, hence the name.

== History ==
The original "Special Settlement" of Karamea in 1875 was on the South Terrace, which although safe from floods had infertile soil and was worthless for agriculture. Local tradition holds that the King brothers were out searching for pigs that had strayed from the Terrace to the south side of the Karamea River, and discovered the fertile flats there. They cleared a patch and planted seeds, which showed such progress that the settlers moved down from the Terrace to this "Promised Land"—aside from the Biblical reference, the settlers had been promised a further allotment of 5 acres from the Government. By the 1880s the settlers had spread across the river to the Land of Promise (Umere).

As settlers moved to the flats it became obvious a school was required, and in 1882 a local committee petitioned the Education Board. The first school building was destroyed by fire, and in1884 a replacement was approved and built for £150. The Karamea School Committee complained that pupils were being drawn away from their school district, and the Land of Promise residents argued that the school should have been sited further upriver at a more convenient crossing. Pupils from Land of Promise crossed the river in canoes, and later a punt, until their own school opened in 1890. The Promised Land School roll rose from 18 to 25 by 1887, and an additional building was added in 1893. The roll stayed constant until the First World War, when it dropped to 15 or 16. After the war the population of Arapito fell, and in 1947 the school was consolidated with the Karamea District High School; the empty building was moved to become the High School's Manual Training Block.

== Demographics ==
Arapito covers 29.45 km^{2} (11.37 sq mi). It is part of the Karamea rural settlement.

Historical population
Year	Pop.	±% p.a.
2006	108	—
2013	96	−1.67%
2018	102	+1.22%
2023	153	+8.45%

Arapito had a population of 153 in the 2023 New Zealand census, an increase of 51 people (50.0%) since the 2018 census, and an increase of 57 people (59.4%) since the 2013 census. There were 75 males and 78 females in 75 dwellings. 2.0% of people identified as LGBTIQ+. The median age was 49.9 years (compared with 38.1 years nationally). There were 24 people (15.7%) aged under 15 years, 12 (7.8%) aged 15 to 29, 72 (47.1%) aged 30 to 64, and 45 (29.4%) aged 65 or older.

People could identify as more than one ethnicity. The results were 96.1% European (Pākehā), 9.8% Māori, 2.0% Pasifika, and 3.9% other, which includes people giving their ethnicity as "New Zealander". English was spoken by 98.0%, and other languages by 7.8%. No language could be spoken by 2.0% (e.g. too young to talk). The percentage of people born overseas was 17.6, compared with 28.8% nationally.

Religious affiliations were 29.4% Christian, and 2.0% New Age. People who answered that they had no religion were 58.8%, and 9.8% of people did not answer the census question.

Of those at least 15 years old, 27 (20.9%) people had a bachelor's or higher degree, 63 (48.8%) had a post-high school certificate or diploma, and 39 (30.2%) people exclusively held high school qualifications. The median income was $24,000, compared with $41,500 nationally. 9 people (7.0%) earned over $100,000 compared to 12.1% nationally. The employment status of those at least 15 was 36 (27.9%) full-time, 33 (25.6%) part-time, and 3 (2.3%) unemployed.

== Climate ==
Climate data for Arapito (1991–2020)
Month	Jan	Feb	Mar	Apr	May	Jun	Jul	Aug	Sep	Oct	Nov	Dec	Year
Record high °C (°F)	33.0 (91.4)	29.2 (84.6)	30.2 (86.4)	26.0 (78.8)	24.5 (76.1)	20.3 (68.5)	19.4 (66.9)	19.3 (66.7)	20.7 (69.3)	23.9 (75.0)	25.8 (78.4)	28.0 (82.4)	33.0 (91.4)
Mean daily maximum °C (°F)	21.0 (69.8)	21.6 (70.9)	20.4 (68.7)	18.1 (64.6)	15.9 (60.6)	13.4 (56.1)	12.9 (55.2)	13.6 (56.5)	14.8 (58.6)	16.0 (60.8)	17.4 (63.3)	19.5 (67.1)	17.1 (62.7)
Daily mean °C (°F)	16.3 (61.3)	16.7 (62.1)	15.3 (59.5)	13.2 (55.8)	11.2 (52.2)	8.9 (48.0)	8.2 (46.8)	9.0 (48.2)	10.3 (50.5)	11.7 (53.1)	13.0 (55.4)	15.2 (59.4)	12.4 (54.4)
Mean daily minimum °C (°F)	11.7 (53.1)	11.8 (53.2)	10.3 (50.5)	8.4 (47.1)	6.5 (43.7)	4.5 (40.1)	3.4 (38.1)	4.4 (39.9)	5.9 (42.6)	7.4 (45.3)	8.7 (47.7)	10.9 (51.6)	7.8 (46.1)
Record low °C (°F)	3.8 (38.8)	3.8 (38.8)	1.5 (34.7)	1.0 (33.8)	−2.4 (27.7)	−4.0 (24.8)	−3.1 (26.4)	−4.0 (24.8)	−2.1 (28.2)	−0.8 (30.6)	2.3 (36.1)	4.0 (39.2)	−4.0 (24.8)
Average rainfall mm (inches)	177.3 (6.98)	127.1 (5.00)	146.5 (5.77)	175.1 (6.89)	196.7 (7.74)	199.3 (7.85)	183.4 (7.22)	185.9 (7.32)	212.4 (8.36)	239.2 (9.42)	190.2 (7.49)	211.4 (8.32)	2,244.5 (88.36)
Mean monthly sunshine hours	210.3	183.4	187.5	155.7	126.7	104.1	119.6	141.7	141.7	157.5	172.4	180.1	1,880.7
Source: NIWA
