= Sophia Anstice =

Dressmaker, draper, businesswoman

Sophia Anstice (née Catesby, 5 November 1849 – 1 August 1926) was a New Zealand dressmaker, draper and businesswoman who started a chain of dressmaking and drapery shops in 19th century New Zealand.

== Early life ==
Anstice was born on 5 November 1849 in Marylebone, London, England to Edward Catesby, a carpenter, and his wife Caroline Catesby (Bailey).

On 12 January 1873 Anstice married Edwin George King at St Martin-in-the-Fields in London. A salesman for a plant seed company, King was the son of the well-known naturalist George Hoadley King.

On 26 October 1874, the couple traveled to New Zealand as assisted immigrants with their son Edwin and King's younger brother, Henry. They arrived at Nelson on the ship Chile. The King family joined a pioneer party that would settle temporarily at Karamea; this was supposed to last from late 1874 through early 1875. The new settlers would receive inexpensive land in Karamea at a bargaining in exchange for labor on public buildings and public works for the new town.

However, it was a poor deal for the King family and the other settlers; Karamea had infertile soil and was very remote. All the settlers had a difficult time surviving. Anstice and King's second child died just a few hours after birth. They did not have a properly consecrated burial ground to inter the infant. According to the King family records on the burial of their second child: Henry King made a coffin out of a packing case. He then carried the coffin with the infant inside several miles to a cemetery.

In 1876, the King family relocated to a homestead further up the Karamea River that had better soil. They were able to plant seeds that Edwin King had brought from England.

In 1878, the family moved to Nelson. Anstice had her third child there, a daughter Lilian Jane King. During this period, Edwin King senior developed tuberculosis, which disabled him. Antice now became the primary provided for the family. In 1879, her fourth child, Harriet Louise King, was born in Nelson.

== Business ==
In 1876, Anstice had established a dressmaking business in Karamea, "St. Alban's House". She used her considerable seamstress skills to create the dresses. Anstice's business was a quick success; she kept the business in Karamea even after moving to Nelson. She later opened another "St. Alban's House" in Nelson. Her business sustained the family after her husband became ill. In February 1880, Edwin King senior died. Approximately nine months later, Anstice's daughter Harriet died.

On 20 June 1886, Anstice married John Snook Anstice. Her new husband owned a bakery in Nelson. He was much older than her and was a widower. The couple had two sons, Herbert Anstice and Leslie Anstice. Leslie died during infancy.

In 1891, Anstice established a drapery and dressmaking business in Nelson. It eventually became known as "S. Anstice, Son and Company". The company soon employed a large number of people.

S. Anstice, Son and Company proved to be a success. Anstice opened other shops in Tākaka, Murchison, and Motueka. Her business took orders from New Zealand's cities and rural areas.

Anstice was a thorough and rigorous business owner, frequently travelling around the country to visit her stores. Anstice visited London several times to see her family. On these trips, she would buy fabric from her relatives' drapery store in Tottenham.

In 1900, Anstice built another St. Alban's House on Trafalgar Street in Nelson.

== Final years ==
In 1917, Anstice's husband John died. She then moved in with Herbert and his family. Until her death, she wore black traditional widow's attire in memory of her late husband. She always wore her hair in a bun.

Sophia Anstice died on 1 August 1926. The business was taken over by Lilian and Herbert. She was buried in Wakapuaka Cemetery in Nelson.
