= Big Rimu Walk =

Walking track in New Zealand

Coordinates: 41°14′54″S 172°11′34″E

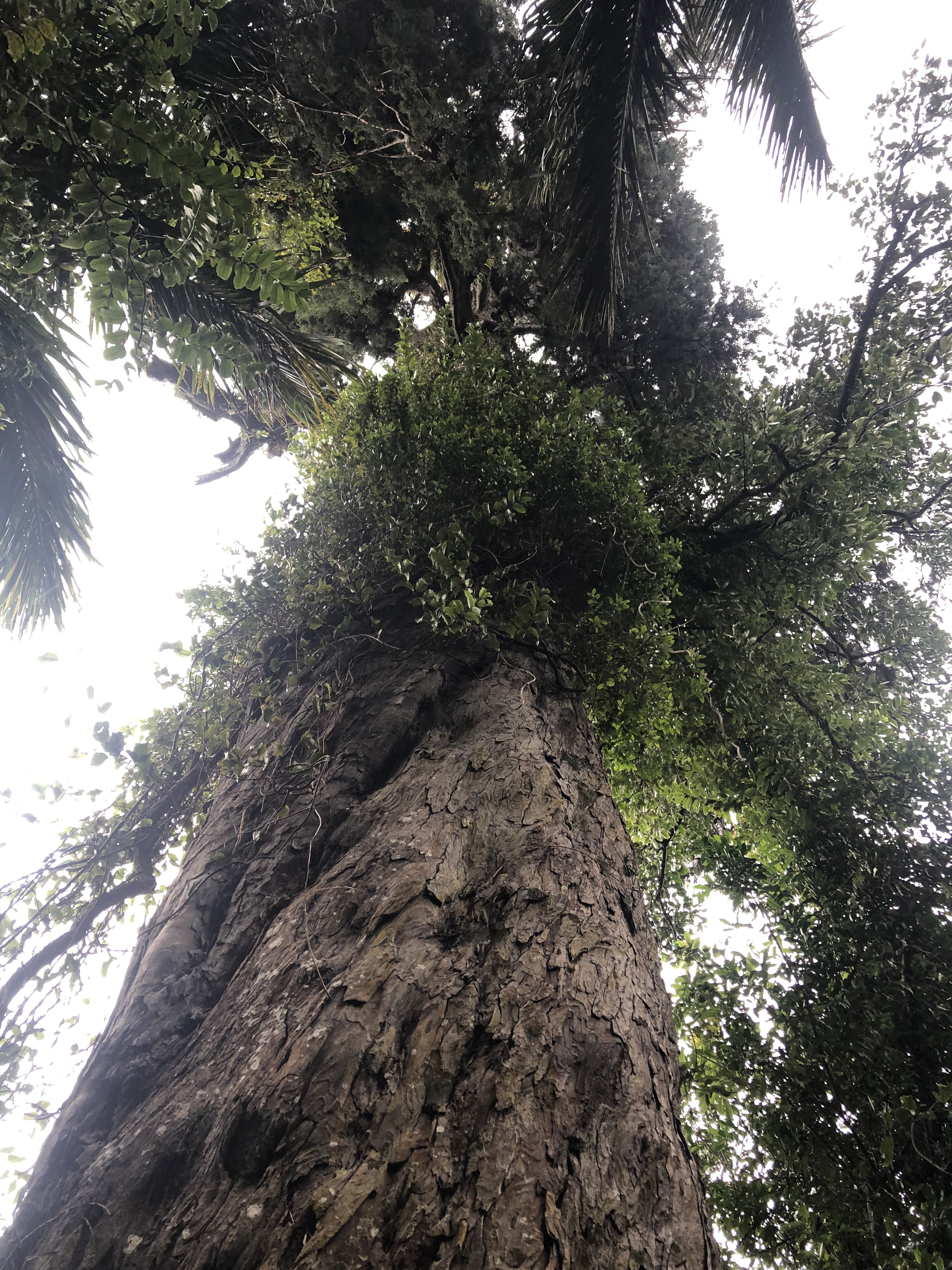
- View towards canopy
- Length: 1.1 km (0.68 mi)
- Location: Kahurangi National Park, New Zealand
- Trailheads: Umere Road
- Use: Nature walk
- Highest point: 80 m (260 ft)
- Difficulty: Easy
- Season: Year round
- Sights: large rimu tree, native bush
- Maintained by: Department of Conservation

The Big Rimu Walk is a nature trail near Karamea, located in Kahurangi National Park on the West Coast of the South Island of New Zealand. A short walk of 1.1 kilometres (0.68 mi) through regenerating bush leads to a large rimu tree (Dacrydium cupressinum) that is 36 metres (118 ft) tall with a trunk over two metres (6 ft 7 in) in diameter and estimated to be over 1,000 years old. Other smaller rimu in the area were logged during the 1940s but this large tree was left.

The regenerating forest is dominated by kāmahi and nīkau, but there are also small rimu trees emerging. The large rimu itself has a northern rātā vine on the trunk, with extensive rātā foliage in the canopy. The tree hosts a large collection of epiphytes. One notable feature of the track to the large rimu is the presence of Dawsonia—a giant moss—growing alongside the track.
