= Little Wanganui River =

River in the Tasman District, New Zealand

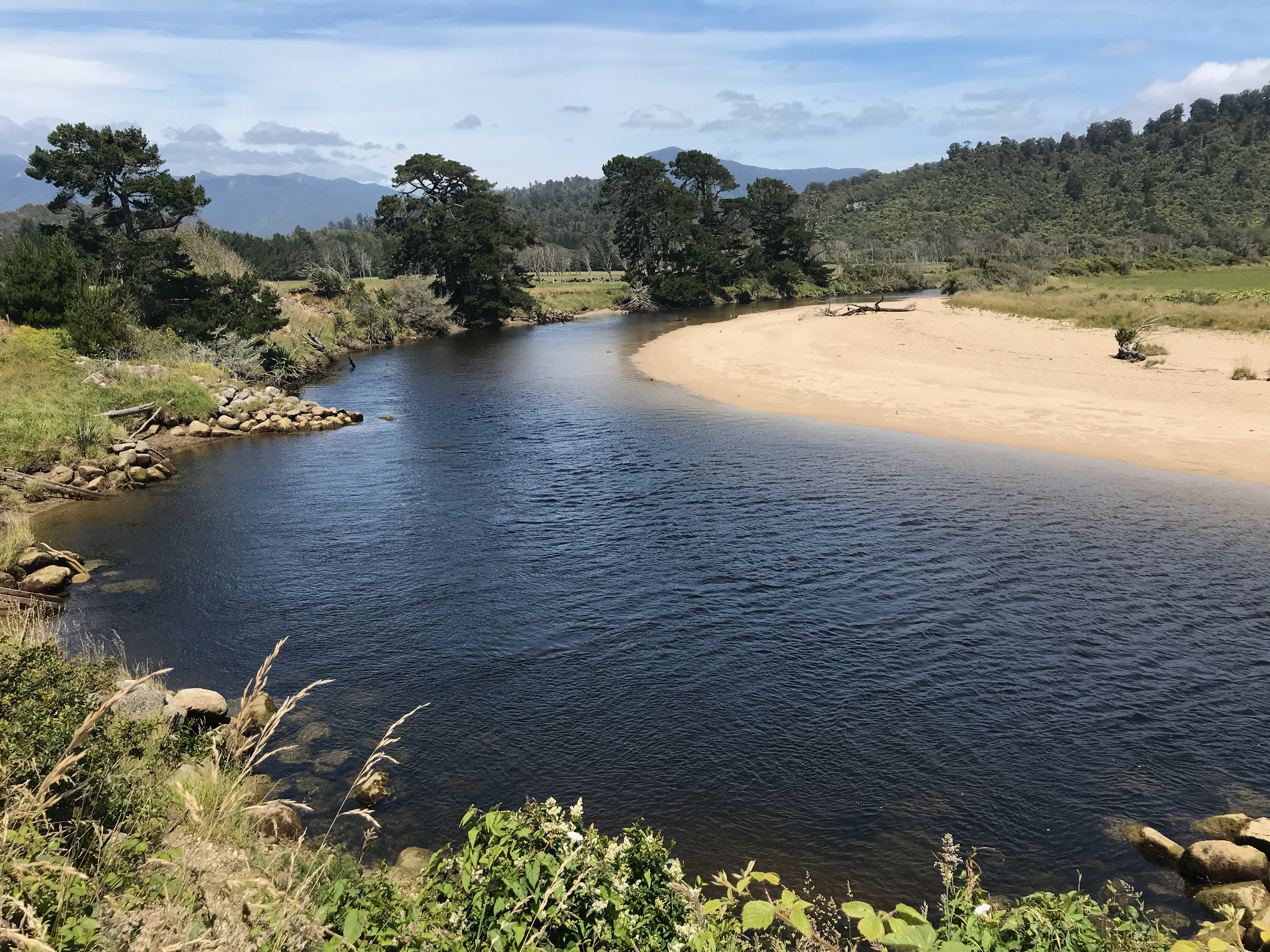
- Route of the Little Wanganui River
- Mouth of the Little Wanganui River Little Wanganui River (South Island)

Location
- Country: New Zealand

Physical characteristics
- Source: Saddle Lakes
  - coordinates: 41.39106°S 172.29064°E
- Mouth
  - location: Karamea Bight
  - coordinates: 41°23′28″S 172°03′26″E
- Length: 21 kilometres (13 mi)

Basin features
- Progression: Little Wanganui River → Karamea Bight → Tasman Sea
- Tributaries
  - left: Kiwi Creek, Piano Creek, Copper Creek, Specimen Creek, Blacktopp Creek, Hodge Creek, Captain Creek, Blue Duck Creek, Tidal Creek, O'Connor Creek, Glasseye Creek
  - right: Winter Creek, Tangent Creek, McHarrie Creek, Smith Creek, Drain Creek, Lawrence Creek, Pigeon Creek, Limestone Creek, Slaty Creek,
- Bridges: Little Whanganui Bridge

The Little Wanganui River is a river of the West Coast Region of New Zealand's South Island. It flows generally west from the slopes of Mount Allen, reaching the Karamea Bight close to the small settlement of Little Wanganui. It is home to a large number of trout.

== See also ==
- List of rivers of New Zealand
