= Little Wanganui =

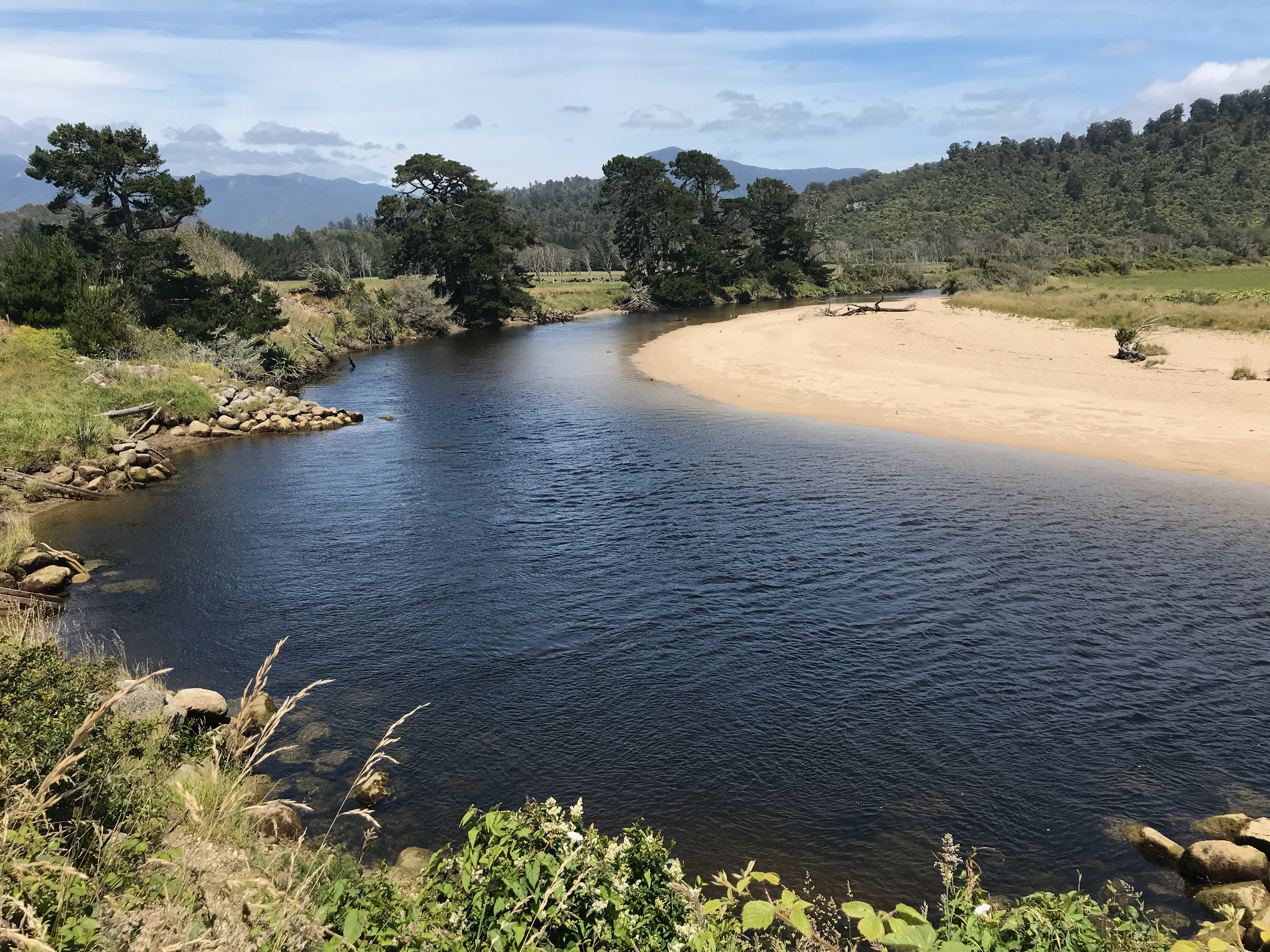
- Little Wanganui River

- Location within New Zealand
- Coordinates: 41°22′36.3″S 172°4′30″E
- Country: New Zealand
- Region: West Coast
- District: Buller District
- Electorates: West Coast-Tasman; Te Tai Tonga

Population (2023 census)
  - Total: 147

Little Wanganui is a dairy-farming village on the West Coast of the South Island of New Zealand, on the Little Wanganui River. It is 77 kilometres (48 mi) north of Westport and 21 kilometres (13 mi) south of Karamea, at the opposite end of the Karamea Beach. The settlement has a pub, community hall, and volunteer fire brigade, and in 2023 the population was 147. There is a surfing beach, and the Little Wanganui River is popular for whitebaiting and fishing for brown trout.

== Settlement ==
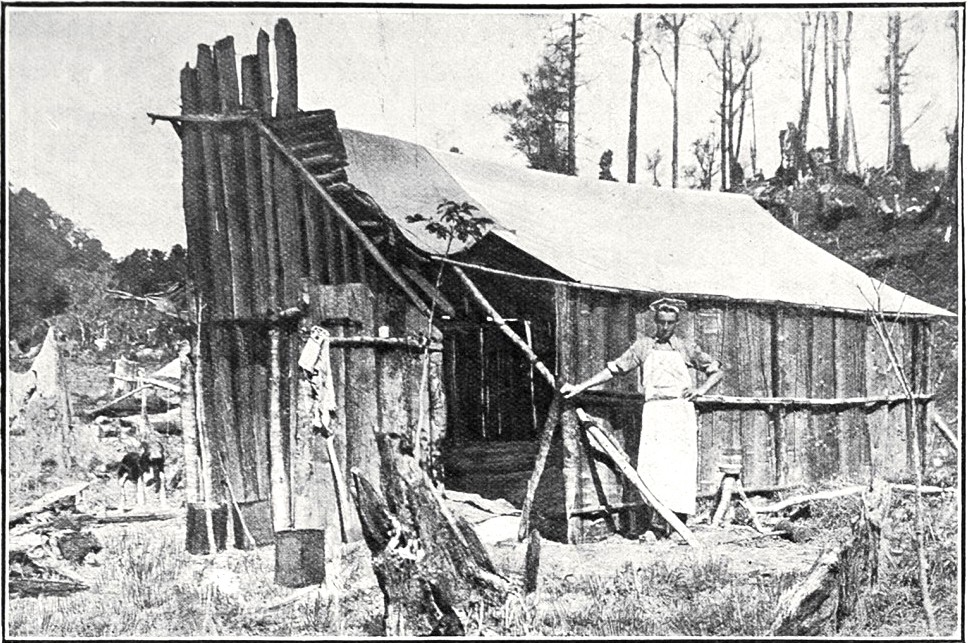
Cook at a surveying camp, Little Wanganui, 1911

Organised settlement started in the 1870s, helped by a government settlement scheme. The wharf was at first a mooring pile in the middle of the river, replaced by a proper wharf about 500 m upstream from the river mouth around 1900 to allow for the loading of timber. A signal station was staffed to let boats know when the tide would allow them to enter. In the early 1900s there were monthly arrivals of supply ships from Westport, which would continue on to Karamea to load up on butter, timber, and flax. By the 1920s there were several sawmills in the area, serviced by a busy port.

Before World War One families had begun to settle in the remote upriver areas of Wangapeka Valley and Blue Duck Creek. Wangapeka children walked to school in Little Wanganui, several miles away, until a schoolhouse was built in 1921. One of the first wirelesses in the area was installed at the school in 1928. In the 1930s, the Marris and Wollett sawmill began operating in the valley, but the population of Wangapeka gradually fell until the school closed in 1935.

At Blue Duck Creek, children attended a Household School from 1917 until a schoolhouse was built. The road to Blue Duck Creek was narrow and frequently washed away by floods; an exceptionally large flood in 1922 destroyed a critical bridge connection with Little Wanganui, and settlers began to leave the area. The school closed in 1922.

On 17 June 1929 the magnitude 7.3 Murchison earthquake struck the area, causing extensive slips and damage to buildings. A huge natural dam formed in the Little Wanganui gorge; this burst three months later, the flood of mud and boulders destroying 4 miles of road and numerous structures, but causing no loss of life.

One consequence of the Murchison earthquake was the filling in of the river mouth with silt and gravel washed down from the mountains, making navigation increasingly hazardous. Shipping stopped in 1946, and in 1952 the port was closed and the wharf dismantled. The last shipping from Little Wanganui was in 1963–1964, when the flat-bottomed scow Kowai took three loads of rimu timber to Nelson. The Kowai was able to enter and leave the river on the spring tide, but on its third trip missed the tide and ended up on shore for weeks, which strained her timbers; she narrowly avoided sinking on the return trip to Golden Bay and never sailed again.

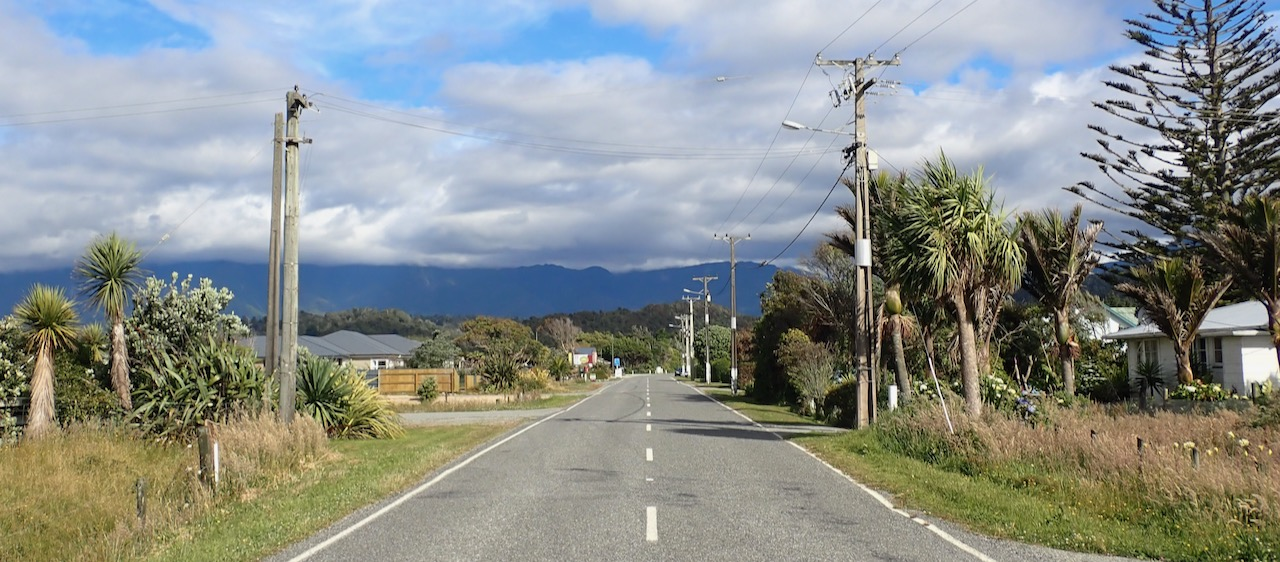
Main road, Little Wanganui

A bridge was built across the Little Wanganui River in 1910, and a road to Westport constructed in 1916 which followed the coast. After the 1929 earthquake, the coastline was elevated between 40 and 100 feet and suffered enormous slips and landslides. This necessitated a new inland route over the Karamea Bluffs to Westport – a two hour trip on a road that was steep, muddy, and often blocked by slips. Reticulated electricity did not arrive in Little Wanganui until 1962, replacing farm generators.

== Demographics ==
Little Wanganui locality covers 62.54 km^{2} (24.15 sq mi). It is part of the Karamea statistical area.

Historical population
Year	Pop.	±% p.a.
2006	129	—
2013	129	+0.00%
2018	105	−4.03%
2023	147	+6.96%

Little Wanganui had a population of 147 in the 2023 New Zealand census, an increase of 42 people (40.0%) since the 2018 census, and an increase of 18 people (14.0%) since the 2013 census. There were 69 males and 78 females in 75 dwellings. 2.0% of people identified as LGBTIQ+. The median age was 53.8 years (compared with 38.1 years nationally). There were 18 people (12.2%) aged under 15 years, 9 (6.1%) aged 15 to 29, 84 (57.1%) aged 30 to 64, and 33 (22.4%) aged 65 or older.

People could identify as more than one ethnicity. The results were 95.9% European (Pākehā), 14.3% Māori, 6.1% Pasifika, 2.0% Asian, and 4.1% other, which includes people giving their ethnicity as "New Zealander". English was spoken by 98.0%, Māori by 2.0%, and other languages by 4.1%. The percentage of people born overseas was 20.4, compared with 28.8% nationally.

Religious affiliations were 18.4% Christian, and 2.0% Māori religious beliefs. People who answered that they had no religion were 69.4%, and 12.2% of people did not answer the census question.

Of those at least 15 years old, 12 (9.3%) people had a bachelor's or higher degree, 81 (62.8%) had a post-high school certificate or diploma, and 39 (30.2%) people exclusively held high school qualifications. The median income was $27,500, compared with $41,500 nationally. 3 people (2.3%) earned over $100,000 compared to 12.1% nationally. The employment status of those at least 15 was 42 (32.6%) full-time, 24 (18.6%) part-time, and 3 (2.3%) unemployed.

== School, hall, and hotel ==
The first school in Little Wanganui was a room in the Rasmussen farmhouse, and a government-sponsored schoolroom opened in 1894; the first teacher, Miss Julia Curtin, was on a salary of £20. A school building was constructed at the beachfront in 1902, and replaced in 1907 at the cost of £225; the roll gradually increased to 23 in the 1920s. After the Murchison earthquake the schoolroom was threatened by erosion, and was relocated in 1931 at a cost of £189 to the middle of the settlement, beside the main road to Westport. The school closed in 1946 when Little Wanganui was integrated with Karamea: a teacher-driver took the pupils the 12 miles to Karamea, and the school building was sold and dismantled.

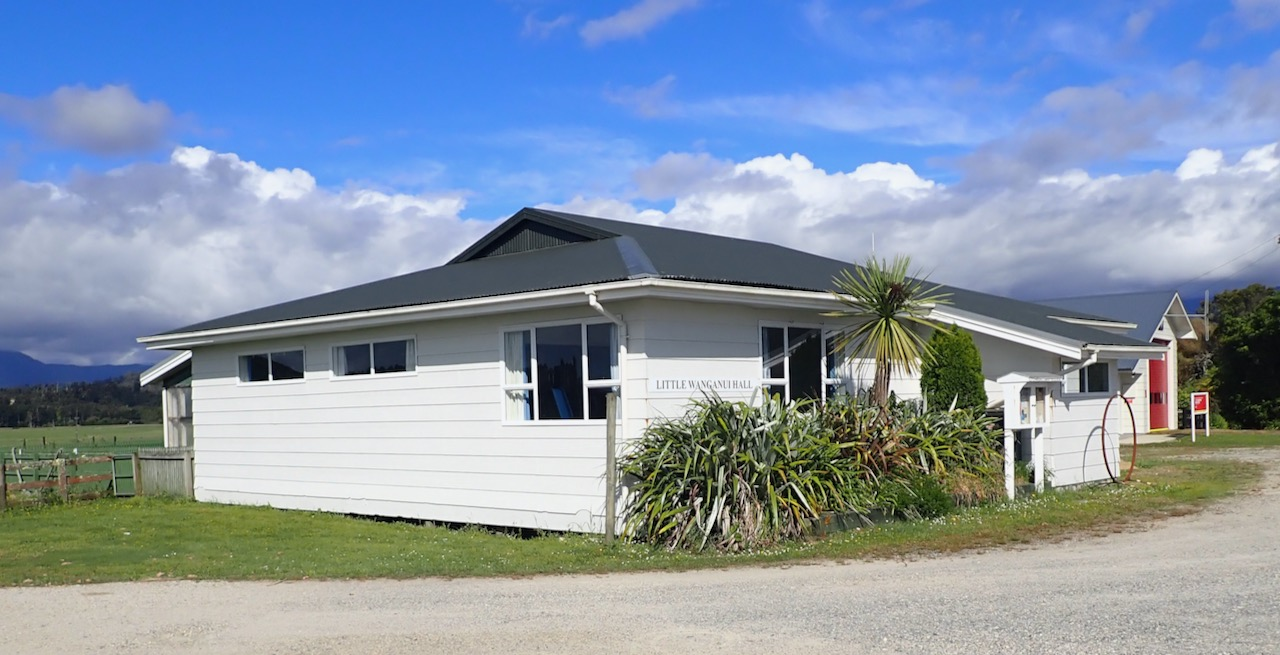
Little Wanganui Community Hall

In 1953 locals agreed to raise the funds to build a community hall on the site of the schoolhouse; the old hall and hotel were located next to the now-closed port. Rimu and mataī trees donated by a local farmer were felled in Wangapeka and milled at Granite Creek, and a team of locals volunteered their time and skills to build the hall and wire it for electricity. With yellow pine pilings and matai flooring, it opened on 17 December 1954. In 1955, the Little Wanganui Hotel was also relocated 2 kilometres (1.2 mi) from the former port to the Karamea Highway; the timber from the old hotel was used to build the new pub.

== Wangapeka Track ==
The western end of the Wangapeka Track is located to the north-east of Little Wanganui, at the end of Wangapeka Road.
