= Proposals for a road through North-west Nelson =

Proposed road in New Zealand

As early as the 1880s, there were proposals for a road through North-west Nelson in the South Island of New Zealand, to connect the remote settlement of Karamea on the West Coast with the Nelson area. Proposals for a route suitable for horse-drawn vehicles from Karamea to Wangapeka, were made in 1868 by the provincial engineer. In 1915, a deputation from Nelson lobbied William Fraser, the Minister of Public Works, about the need for a Karamea–Wangapeka road to enable stock to be moved between the regions. In 1924, the Karamea Progress League lobbied the Nelson Chamber of Commerce about the urgency of completing a road over the route. There was further pressure from farming interests in 1920 and 1924 to build a road over the Wangapeka Track through to Karamea, to permit stock movement between the Nelson and Karamea regions.

In October 1931, the government indicated a willingness to proceed with a road through north-west Nelson via a different route, along the Heaphy Track. However, in 1934 government declined to fund further work. In October 1936, Bob Semple, the Minister for Public Works, questioned whether the proposed road was economically viable. In 1937, the chairmen of the Buller and Collingwood county councils went to lobby the government in Wellington in support of the road.

A road through the Wangapeka was proposed again in 1968, but the Minister of Works stated in a letter to the South Island Publicity Association: "The cost of constructing and maintaining a road over the high passes on the Wangapeka route and through badly faulted earthquake shattered country would be prohibitive".

Proposals to build a road through the Heaphy Track became the subject of public controversy in March 1973. The local West Coast and Collingwood population and councils largely supported the road, believing that a complete "tourist circuit" of the South Island would increase the access and popularity of their area. A lobby group called “The Organisation to Preserve the Heaphy”, was formed in April 1973. Other groups opposed to a road through the Heaphy Track included the Royal Forest and Bird Protection Society, Federated Mountain Clubs and the Nature Conservation Council.

The Ministry of Works investigated routes for a road between Karamea and Collingwood. Three options were outlined to government in September 1973:

1. Along the route of the Heaphy Track from Karamea to Bainham
2. Along the route of the Heaphy Track to the Mackay Downs and then north west to the coast at the mouth of the Big River and then along the coast to join the existing road at Turimawiwi
3. From Karamea to Tadmor, over the route of the Wangapeka Track

The first option was ruled out because of the impact on the North-west Nelson Forest Park and the effects on the Heaphy Track. The third option was rejected because of the difficulty and cost of building a road through steep and unstable earthquake-shattered terrain. The second “coastal” route was endorsed in principle, but was not an immediate priority. Opposition groups criticised the plan for the destruction of up to 23 km (14 mi) of the Heaphy Track, including the unique sub-tropical coastal section. A new proposal for a road through the Wangapeka track was made in 1973, as part of lobbying in opposition to the proposal for a road through the Heaphy Track. The president of the Organisation to Preserve the Heaphy advocated for a road through the Wangapeka as an alternative to avoid the impact on the Heaphy.

The public controversy about the proposed road through the Heaphy lead to a marked increase in the numbers walking the track. During the 1973/74 New Year period, a severe storm led to 82 people taking shelter in the Gouland Downs Hut – a building with only six bunks. Lobbying from those supporting and opposing the road through the Heaphy Track continued into 1975. In 1976, the Government announced that work on the environmental impact report for the proposed road would not proceed.

In December 1995, just prior to the formal establishment of Kahurangi National Park, the Minister of Lands, Denis Marshall, withdrew the designations of unformed legal road that had been put in place to enable a road between Karamea and Collingwood.

The idea of a South Island loop road, including a connection between Karamea and Collingwood was raised again in 2015.

The idea of a route through the Wangapeka was raised again in 2015 by the mayor of Buller as a means of boosting the West Coast economy in response to the decline of the coal industry. Points raised in opposition included the threats that a road through the Wangapeka would pose for endangered birds including rock wrens and whio (blue duck). A commentator described the Karamea to Collingwood road as an “idea whose time has gone”. Opposition to the mayor's proposal for a road through Kahurangi National Park included this response by Jonathan Carson of the New Zealand news website Stuff:

The Wangapeka Track provides a rare glimpse of primordial New Zealand. It feels remote and ancient. A lot has been invested into protecting the native wildlife, particularly the nationally vulnerable whio, in the area. A road would likely require widespread deforestation and destruction of habitat. Once a road is built there's no going back.
