= Kahurangi (disambiguation) =

Kahurangi is a Māori word meaning "treasured" or "deep blue". It most often refers to Kahurangi National Park.

Kahurangi may also refer to:

== Geography ==
- Kahurangi Marine Reserve
- Kahurangi Point
- Kahurangi River

== Given names ==
- Kahurangi (given name) – several people
