= Lewis River (West Coast) =

River in Kahurangi National Park, New Zealand

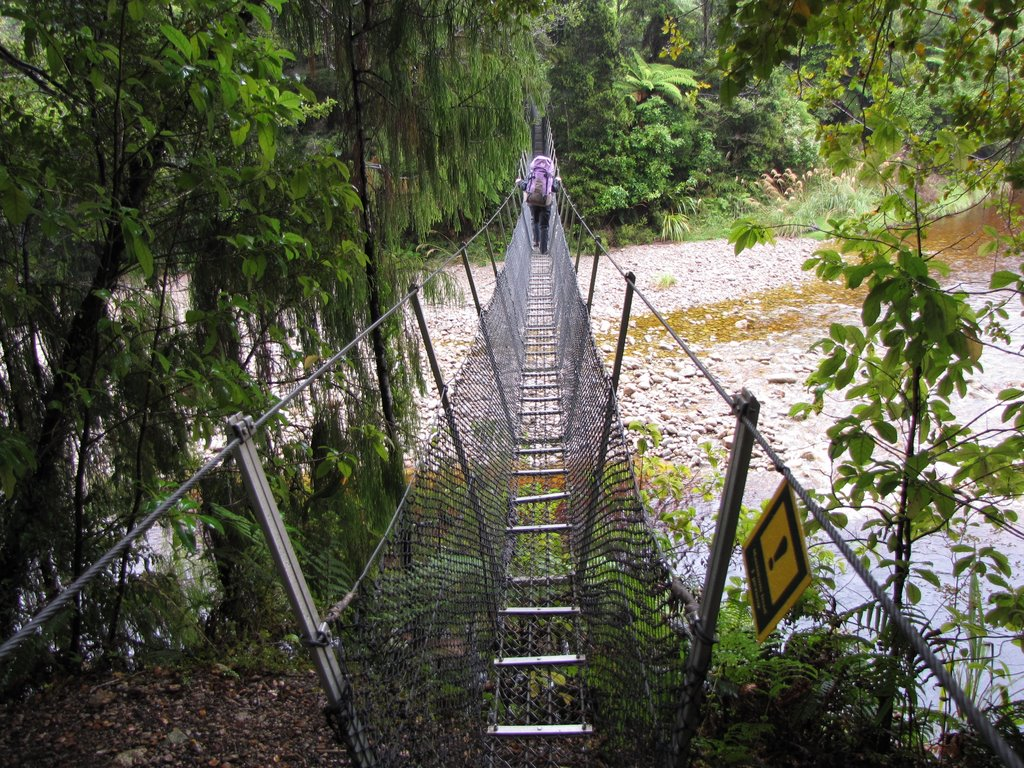
- Swing bridge on the Heaphy Track over the Lewis River
- Route of the Lewis River
- Mouth of the Lewis River Lewis River (West Coast) (South Island)

Location
- Country: New Zealand

Physical characteristics
- Source
  - location: Saxon Ridge
  - coordinates: 40°51′40″S 172°14′06″E
- Mouth
  - location: Heaphy River
  - coordinates: 40°56′28″S 172°08′49″E

Basin features
- Progression: Lewis River → Heaphy River → Karamea Bight → Tasman Sea
- Tributaries
  - right: Fox Creek

The Lewis River is a tributary of the Heaphy River in New Zealand's Kahurangi National Park.

== Description ==
The Lewis River is located in the Buller District. It was named for C. Lewis, one of the contractors who built the Heaphy Track in 1886. (Note: Note that the Place Names of New Zealand entry is for Lewis Creek, but this is presumably a mistake as neither Topomap nor the New Zealand Geographic Board list a Lewis Creek in Tasman. The entry reads: "Lewis Creek: Tasman. After C. Lewis, who was one of the contractors who formed the Heaphy Track in 1886.") The Lewis River originates at Mackay Downs, a flat south-west of the Saxon Ridge. It flows into the Heaphy River at Lewis Hut. After the river was encroaching the hut, it was removed and replaced nearby by Lewis Shelter. Land Information New Zealand lists the name of the river as "official", i.e. the name is confirmed by the New Zealand Geographic Board.

The Heaphy Track used to cross the Lewis River via a swing bridge near Lewis Hut. This swing bridge was washed away in July 2012. The track was rerouted and from 30 November 2012, it crossed the Heaphy River instead.

== History ==
Heavy rain in the Buller District in February 2022 caused significant damage. The suspension bridge over the Heaphy River was destroyed. The suspension bridge over the Gunner River was damaged but was deemed repairable, while the Pitt Creek bridge was swept away. Instead of replacing the damaged Heaphy River suspension bridge in its existing location, the solution chosen was to build two bridges, one across the Lewis River, and another across the Heaphy River downstream from the original bridge, with a small section of new track in between. The track re-opened in October 2023.

== See also ==
- List of rivers of New Zealand
