= Heaphy Track =

New Zealand tramping track

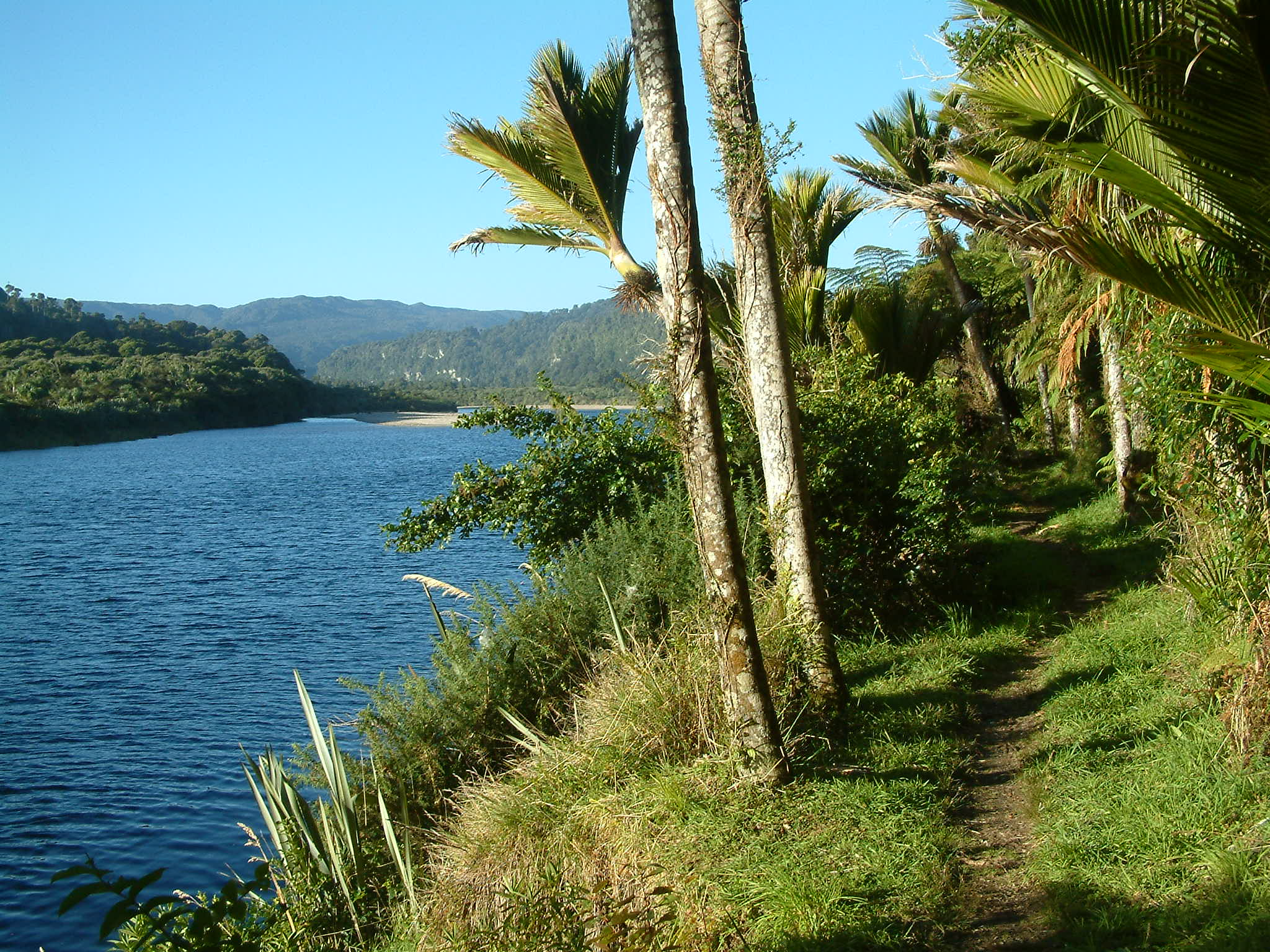
- Along the Heaphy River
- Length: 78.4 km (48.7 mi)
- Location: Kahurangi National Park
- Designation: New Zealand Great Walks
- Trailheads: Heaphy Track Car Park and Shelter 40.847925°S 172.449409°E; Kōhaihai road end 41.109052°S 172.103141°E
- Use: Tramping; Mountain biking
- Highest point: 915 m (3,002 ft)
- Lowest point: 0 m (0 ft)
- Season: all year (tramping); winter (mountain biking)
- Maintained by: Department of Conservation

Map of Heaphy Track

The Heaphy Track is a popular tramping and mountain biking track in the north west of the South Island of New Zealand. It is located within the Kahurangi National Park and classified as one of New Zealand's ten Great Walks by the Department of Conservation. Named after Charles Heaphy, the track is 78.4 kilometres (48.7 mi) long and is usually walked in four or five days. The track is open for shared use with mountain bikers in the winter season from 1 May to 30 September each year. The southern end of the track is at Kōhaihai, north of Karamea on the northern West Coast, and the northern end is in the upper valley of the Aorere River, Golden Bay.

Floods in February 2022 caused major damage to three bridges on the West Coast end of the track, leading to the closure of the section between James Mackay Hut and Heaphy Hut, and preventing walkers and cyclists from completing the full distance. The damaged section of track re-opened in October 2023, after the replacement of bridges and restoration of tracks damaged in the 2022 floods.

== History ==
Māori iwi are known to have settled along the lower course of the Heaphy River as early as the 14th century. There is a significant archaeological site near the existing Heaphy Hut that has been the subject of significant investigations. The evidence from these investigations suggests that at least some of the area crossed by today's Heaphy Track had been explored and settled by Māori in pre-European times. No evidence has yet been found of middens in the Gouland Downs area, however middens have been found at all the main river-mouths south of the Heaphy River. This suggests that the route along the coast had been used regularly by Māori.

The first visit to the area by European persons whose names were recorded took place in 1846, when Charles Heaphy, Thomas Brunner and their Māori guide Kehu (Ngāti Apa ki te Rā Tō, Ngāti Tūmatakōkiri), supported by another guide Tau, explored the coastal sector of the track.

In October 1856, James Mackay and a colleague John Clark explored the headwaters of the Aorere River, in search of a large grassy plan that had been reported by Māori to lie between the Aorere and the West Coast. They found a large scrub-covered area that was later named the Gouland Downs, but did not travel across it or mark out a route to the West Coast at that time.

The first recorded crossing approximately along today's route was by a European gold miner named Aldrige in 1859. Another crossing by James Mackay took place in 1860. At the time, Mackay was returning from leading the Crown purchase from Māori of all the land on the West Coast within the Nelson province. His party turned inland at the Heaphy River, and then travelled up the Lewis River to the saddle. From there they crossed the Gouland Downs and descended via the Aorere River back to Collingwood.

The discovery of gold at Karamea in 1861 led to increased interest in the route between Nelson and the West Coast. In December 1861, Mackay, along with John and Arthur Knyvett, created a rough track between the upper Aorere River and the Heaphy River mouth. The Nelson Provincial Council allocated funding for work on the track in 1866 and 1867, but there is no record of further work on the track until 1885, when the Public Works Department asked the Collingwood County Council to initiate a survey. The Council engaged James Saxon a surveyor from Nelson, and he laid out a route suitable for horse carts from the Brown river to the Gouland Downs, with a grade of 1 in 16. His plans were approved by the Public Works Department in 1886.

During and after the West Coast gold rush of the 1860s the area was extensively visited for gold and the track was definitely laid out by various prospectors and surveyors, among them John Saxon in 1888. No gold was found in the area and, after thirty years, prospecting came to an end. By 1900, the track was virtually forgotten and had become overgrown and seldom used except by an occasional hunter.

The creation of the North-west Nelson Forest Park in 1965, which became Kahurangi National Park in 1996, led to the rediscovery and improvement of the track.

The track is now tramped by thousands of people every year.

=== Partial track closure in 2022 ===
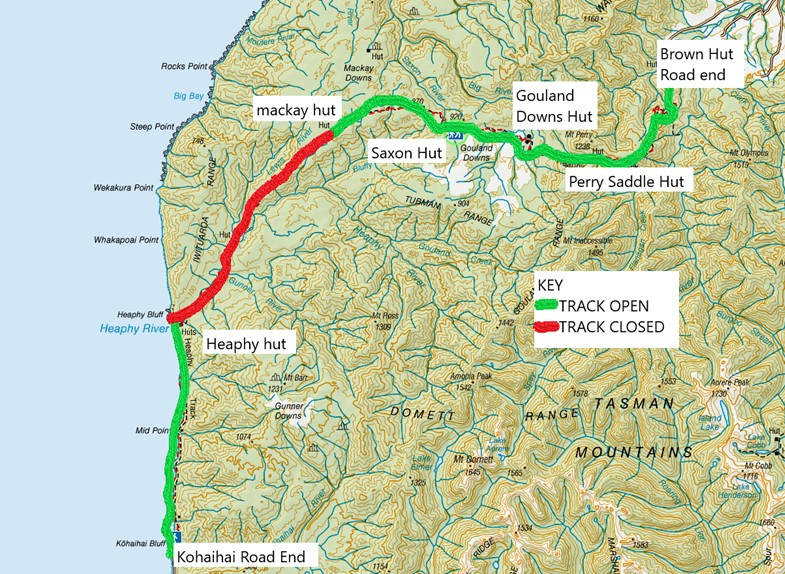
Heaphy Track markup showing section closed in 2022

In early February 2022, heavy rain in the Buller District caused severe flooding and damage to the track and to three bridges on the final section of the track between James Mackay and Heaphy Huts. The suspension bridge over the Gunner River was damaged and the Pitt Creek bridge was swept away. The 148.8 m-long (488 ft) suspension bridge over the Heaphy River was destroyed. The bridge across the Heaphy was the longest suspended deck bridge in the country when it was built in 2013. Although the bridge deck was 6.5 m (21 ft) above normal river level, the bridge was damaged beyond repair in the floods. In addition to the damage to bridges, the severe weather also caused slips and windfall on the track from James Mackay Hut down to the river valley. The section of the track between James Mackay and Heaphy Huts was closed because of the extensive damage, although the rest of the track and huts were re-opened during February for return trips from the two road ends. The rest of the track and all the huts remained open, and the track could be accessed for return trips from either road-end. A helicopter shuttle service was established as an option to take walkers between Lewis Shelter and Heaphy Hut.

The track re-opened in October 2023, after the replacement of bridges and restoration of tracks damaged in the 2022 floods. Prior to the re-opening, 12,000 people had booked accommodation on the track over the next eight months.

== Road access ==
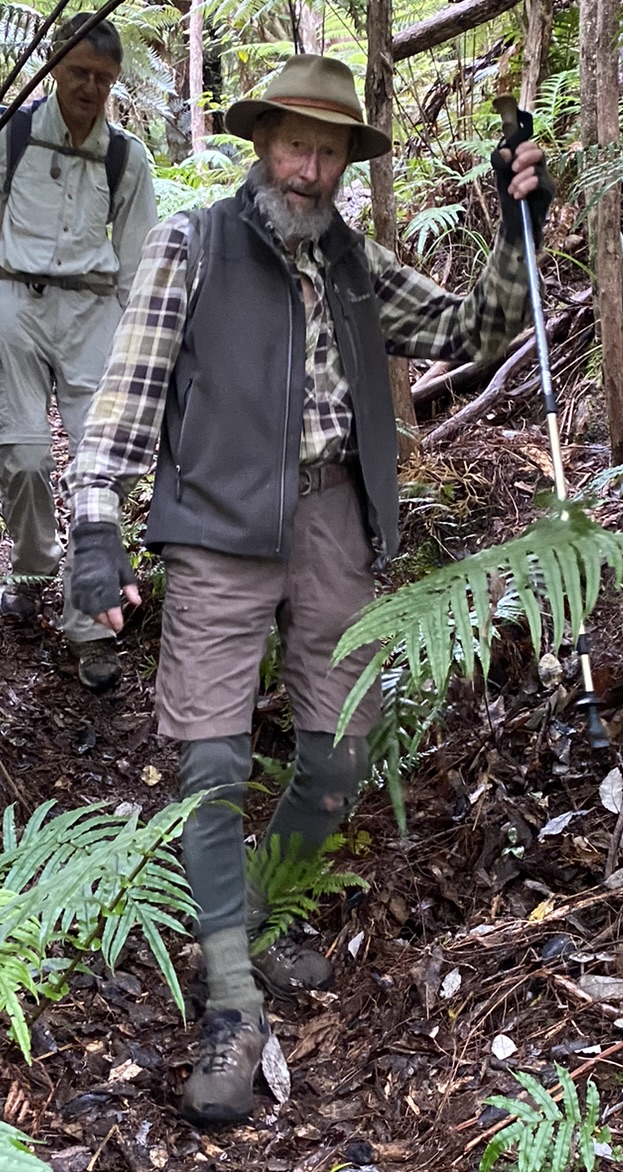
Derry Kingston in 2024

From the south, the road from Karamea to the Kōhaihai River is unsealed for the last 4 kilometres (2.5 mi), as of January 2018.

From the north, the road from Collingwood to Brown Hut is sealed as far as Bainham, then unsealed for the final 15 kilometres (9.3 mi). The road access was originally via three fords, but after ongoing concern about drivers taking risks in crossing the fords to get to the track, and some becoming stranded in swollen streams, DOC took the unusual step of providing funding to Tasman District Council for three bridges to be built; these were finished in 2014.

The road ends of the Heaphy Track are 463 kilometres (288 mi) apart, hence travel logistics are challenging. Various companies provide travel options, one of which is car transfer from one end to the other. Derry Kingston provided car transfer services until his retirement in 2018, driving a vehicle from one end to the other and then walking back. He probably holds the record of having walked the track the most times, with over 400 crossings.

== Route ==
The track can be travelled in either direction but the route from Golden Bay to Karamea is described here.

=== Brown Hut to Perry Saddle Hut ===
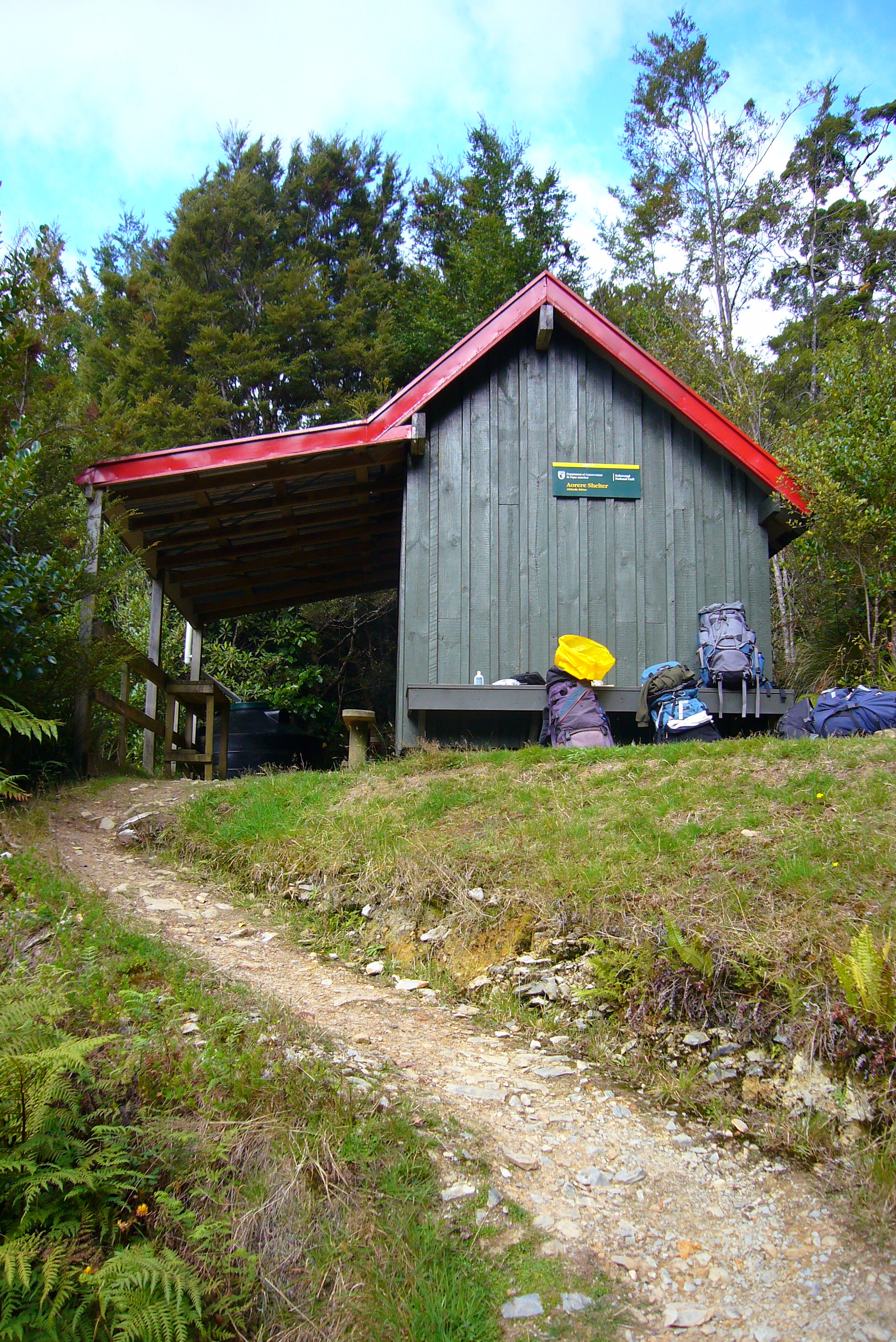
Aorere Shelter – Heaphy Track

Brown Hut is located only five minutes walk from the carpark at the end of Aorere Valley road. There is a campsite located close to the hut. The track from Brown Hut crosses Brown River and a grassy flat before climbing through regenerating forest. The 17 km (11 mi) route to Perry Saddle is almost entirely uphill, and has a consistent gradient. The zigzag path follows the route of a bridle track surveyed and built in 1886 by John Saxon. The track climbs steadily through mature beech forest, mostly red beech (Nothofagus fusca) and hard beech (Nothofagus truncata) trees, but there are also podocarps including rimu and miro, southern rātā and other species such as kāmahi. Birds that may be seen in the forest on the climb to Perry Saddle Hut include tomtits, robins and bellbird. Kākā may also be seen or heard near the top. There is a side branch of the track reached after about 90 minutes climbing. This leads down to Shakespeare Flat on the Aorere River. After 3–4 hours climb, the Aorere shelter and campsite at about 800 m (2,600 ft) elevation provides a place to rest. The highest point on the Heaphy Track, at 915 m (3,002 ft), is reached after another hour. There is a lookout point nearby. From here, it is another 30 minutes walk to Perry Saddle Hut. The hut has 28 bunks.

=== Perry Saddle Hut to Gouland Downs Hut ===
From the Perry Saddle Hut, the track passes over the saddle and follows the true left of the Perry Creek. There is a side-trip route up to the peak of Mount Perry, at 1,238 m (4,062 ft) elevation that in suitable conditions provides panoramic views over the Aorere Valley and Golden Bay towards the North Island, and inland over the Gouland Downs and the rest of the Kahurangi National Park. The main track re-enters forest for about an hour until reaching the edge of the Gouland Downs. The route then descends gradually to the Cave Brook and then reaches the historic Gouland Downs Hut. The existing hut was built by the Collingwood County Council in 1936. There are many limestone arches, caves and small waterfalls that can be accessed near the hut.

==== Geology of the Gouland Downs ====
This area is a peneplain, a low-relief plain formed from prolonged erosion. Beneath the tussock in the Gouland Downs are sandstone and mudstone sedimentary rocks that were formed in the Lower Palaeozoic era around 400 to 500 million years ago. They are some of the oldest rocks in New Zealand. These rocks were worn down by erosion to form the peneplain around 100 million years ago. They were then submerged beneath a shallow sea, and limestone was deposited on top of the older sedimentary rocks. The land was subsequently uplifted, and erosion removed most of the limestone, leaving isolated outcrops that now appear like tree-covered islands in the tussock landscape. The remaining areas of the Gouland Downs have shallow and infertile soil where the only plants that thrive are tussocks and rushes.

==== Introduction of takahē ====
In 2018, the Department of Conservation translocated 30 endangered takahē to the Gouland Downs, from the breeding facility at Burwood Takahē Centre in Southland. This release is part of a programme to ensure the survival of the species. The Gouland Downs area was chosen for the release partly because the Kahurangi National Park has had intensive pest control over many years, and along with natural barriers, this has kept down the population of predators such as cats and ferrets. Takahē can now be regularly seen near Gouland Downs Hut.

=== Gouland Downs Hut to Saxon Hut ===
The track from Gouland Downs Hut continues across the northern part of the Gouland Downs, crossing Shiner Brook, Big River and Weka Creek over simple suspension bridges before descending into the headwaters of the Saxon River and reaching Saxon Hut. The hut is named after John Saxon who surveyed the track in 1886. The endangered blue duck (or whio) may be seen in this section of the route. Great spotted kiwi can often be heard calling in the area around Saxon Hut, and are occasionally seen at night.

=== Saxon Hut to James Mackay Hut ===
The route descends gently through forest to the Saxon River, and then over a flat to Blue Duck Creek. It then climbs through forest in a long sidle around the slopes of Mt Teddy before reaching the Mackay Downs. The James Mackay Hut is on the edge of the downs, and is situated on a terrace above the track. It has views of the Heaphy River mouth and the Tasman Sea to the south-west.

=== James Mackay Hut to Heaphy Hut ===
The track descends through forest along a spur between Deception Creek to the south and the Lewis River to the north. The type of vegetation changes markedly as the track descends towards the Heaphy River. Stunted manuka and beech trees seen at the top become taller, and the sub-canopy and ground vegetation becomes more dense. At the bottom of the descent, there is typical West Coast rainforest, and the first nīkau palms can be seen. There is a shelter near the junction of the Lewis and Heaphy Rivers.

The route then crosses the Heaphy River and the track then follows a large bend in the river under limestone bluffs. The track follows the true left of the Heaphy River and crosses the Gunner River near its junction with the Heaphy. The vegetation along this part of the route is lowland podcarp forest, with an increasing number of nīkau palms closer to Heaphy Hut, where they dominate the forest. The Heaphy Hut and campsite is around 500 m (1,600 ft) back from the beach, overlooking the Heaphy River mouth, with a view of surf and the Tasman Sea.

=== Heaphy Hut to Kōhaihai River mouth ===
This final section of the track is all close to the coastline, with the route partly in forest and partly on the beach or beach margins. There are several stream crossings along the route. The Katipo Creek shelter is located at the mid-point of this section of the track. The landscape of the coastline with its pounding surf and the coastal forest with groves of nīkau palms is described by some as the highlight of the track. Towards the end of this section of the track there is a climb from Scotts Beach to around 160 m (520 ft) over a saddle set back from Kōhaihai Bluff. The track then descends to a crossing of the Kōhaihai River and the end of the track at the car park.

== Mountain biking ==
Prior to the establishment of Kahurangi National Park in 1996, mountainbiking was a popular activity on the Heaphy Track. In the final 12 months before the North West Nelson Forest Park became a National Park, around 2000 mountain bikers completed the route. At the time, the National Parks Act 1980 did not permit mountain biking in National Parks, other than on formed roads. Lobbying activities to allow the return of mountain biking on the Heaphy track continued through until 2011, when a three-year trial began. The trial permitted mountain biking during the winter season from 1 May to 30 September.

The mountain bike trial period ended in 2016 and mountain biking became a permanent option over the colder part of the year. Mountain biking is now allowed each year from 1 May to 30 November for groups not exceeding six riders.

== Incidents ==
The route of the Heaphy Track is subject to high rainfall, and is prone to flooding. Until the 1970s there were significant streams across the track that were not bridged, leading to the risk of trampers becoming stranded, or being swept away while trying to cross a flooded stream.

There was a fatality of a track worker at Kohaihai Bluff in 1919, but there are no recorded deaths from then until the 1960s.

In October 1965, a school teacher from Rockville in the Aorere Valley went missing on the Heaphy Track while attempting to travel on his horse from Karamea back to Rockville. Despite several searches, his body was never found. In March 1972, a visitor from the United States, went missing on the climb up from Brown Hut in poor weather when she became separated from her tramping companion. Despite extensive searches, no trace of her was found. In April 1973, a member of a party from the University of Canterbury Tramping Club was swept away while attempting to cross the flooded Cave Creek. His body was never found. In the report from the subsequent Coroner's enquiry, the Coroner said: "Only fit and well-equipped people should attempt to walk the Heaphy Track".

Controversies in the 1970s about the proposal for a road through Heaphy Track led to increased interest in the track and a large increase in the number of trampers. On one night, there were 82 staying overnight at the Gouland Downs Hut. Around the same time, four people had to be rescued from the track over a period of only two days: one girl with asthma, another girl with glandular fever, a young girl with exposure and a boy with a broken bone in his foot. There had been continual rain for three days with around 4 in (100 mm) in one 24 hour period, and the huts had become overcrowded.

In March 1976, a tramper was swept away while attempting to cross the flooded Weka Creek on the Gouland Downs. Her body was never found.

An unusual incident with a happy ending began on 19 January 1980, when a tramper from Palmerston North became disoriented on the descent from Perry Saddle Hut to the end of the track in poor weather and went missing for almost 30 days. His abandoned campsite at Shakespeare Flat on the upper Aorere River was discovered by searchers but he was not found until 18 February – the final day of planned searches. He had travelled 15 km (9.3 mi) upstream when searchers had been expecting he would have moved downstream. He was flown to hospital, and made a good recovery, being discharged in five days. Only a few weeks later, on 17 March 1980 three young trampers from Auckland died when they were swept off rocks at Crayfish Point, just 5 km (3.1 mi) from the end of the track at Kōhaihai.

In March 1982, a solo tramper from Canterbury went missing on the track. He had wandered off the path and become lost after leaving Perry Saddle Hut on the way south. He was eventually found by search parties after he had spent nine days lost in the bush. There was another large search in April 1988 for a nurse from Auckland who had started on the track on her own from the Karamea end in mid March, and was last seen at Heaphy Hut. She was reported missing when she did not arrive home after the end of her holiday. The route was in poor condition at the time after a period of heavy rain, and rivers were swollen. A large search failed to find any sign of the missing woman.

== Through-road controversy ==
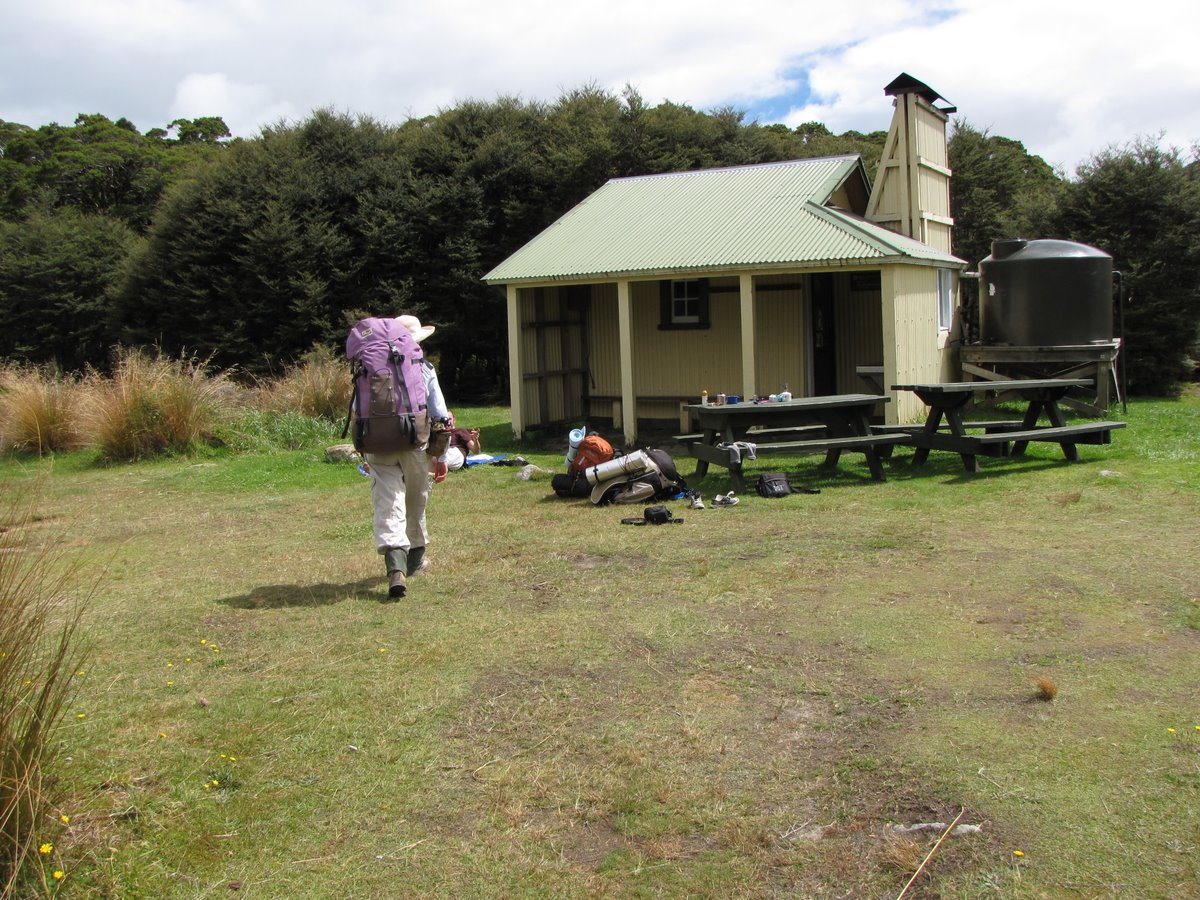
82 people took shelter in the Gouland Downs Hut over the 1973–1974 New Year period during a three-day rain storm; the intense track use was a result of the roading debate

As early as the 1880s, there was demand for a road to connect Karamea with the Nelson area. In October 1931, the government indicated a willingness to proceed with a road through the route of the Heaphy Track. However, in 1934 government declined to fund further work. In October 1936, Bob Semple, the Minister for Public Works, questioned whether the proposed road was economically viable.

Proposals to build a road became the subject of public controversy in March 1973. The local West Coast and Collingwood population and councils largely supported the road, believing that a complete "tourist circuit" of the South Island would increase the access and popularity of their area. A lobby group called “The Organisation to Preserve the Heaphy”, was formed in April 1973. Other groups opposed to a road through the Heaphy Track included the Royal Forest and Bird Protection Society, Federated Mountain Clubs and the Nature Conservation Council.

The Ministry of Works investigated routes for a road between Karamea and Collingwood. Three options were outlined to government in September 1973:

1. Along the route of the Heaphy Track from Karamea to Bainham
2. Along the route of the Heaphy Track to the Mackay Downs and then north west to the coast at the mouth of the Big River and then along the coast to join the existing road at Turimawiwi
3. From Karamea to Tadmor, over the route of the Wangapeka Track

The first option was ruled out because of the impact on the North-west Nelson Forest Park and the effects on the Heaphy Track. The third option was rejected because of the difficulty and cost of building a road through steep and unstable earthquake-shattered terrain. The second “coastal” route was endorsed in principle, but was not an immediate priority. Opposition groups criticised the plan for the destruction of up to 23 km (14 mi) of the Heaphy Track, including the unique sub-tropical coastal section. Lobbying from those supporting and opposing the road continued into 1975. In 1976, the Government announced that work on the environmental impact report for the proposed road would not proceed.

In December 1995, just prior to the formal establishment of Kahurangi National Park, the Minister of Lands, Denis Marshall, withdrew the designations of unformed legal road that had been put in place to enable a road between Karamea and Collingwood. In response to further lobbying in 1996 by Buller Mayor Garry Howard, a commentator described the Karamea to Collingwood road as an “idea whose time has gone”.

Heaphy Track impressions

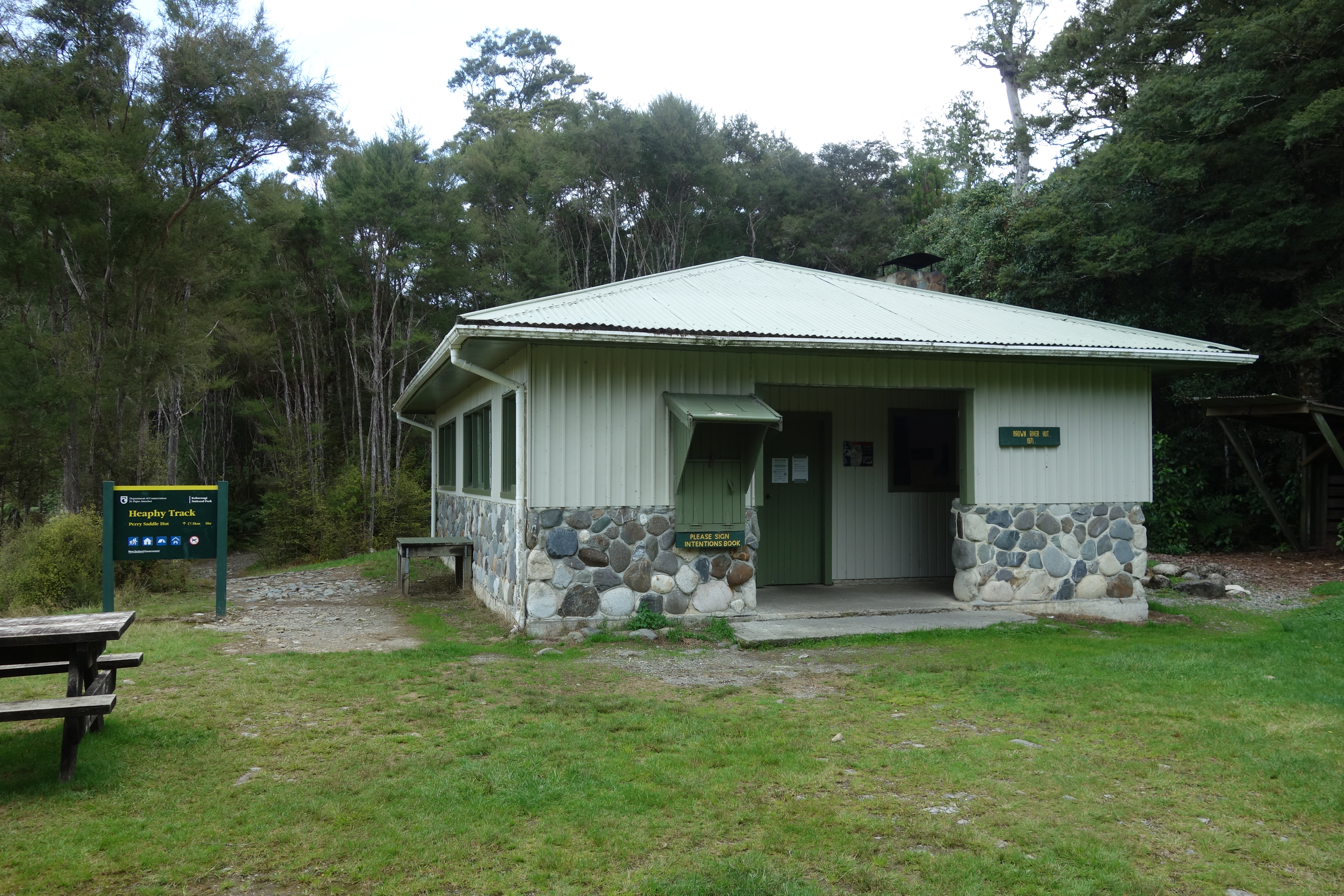
Brown Hut marks the Golden Bay end of the track

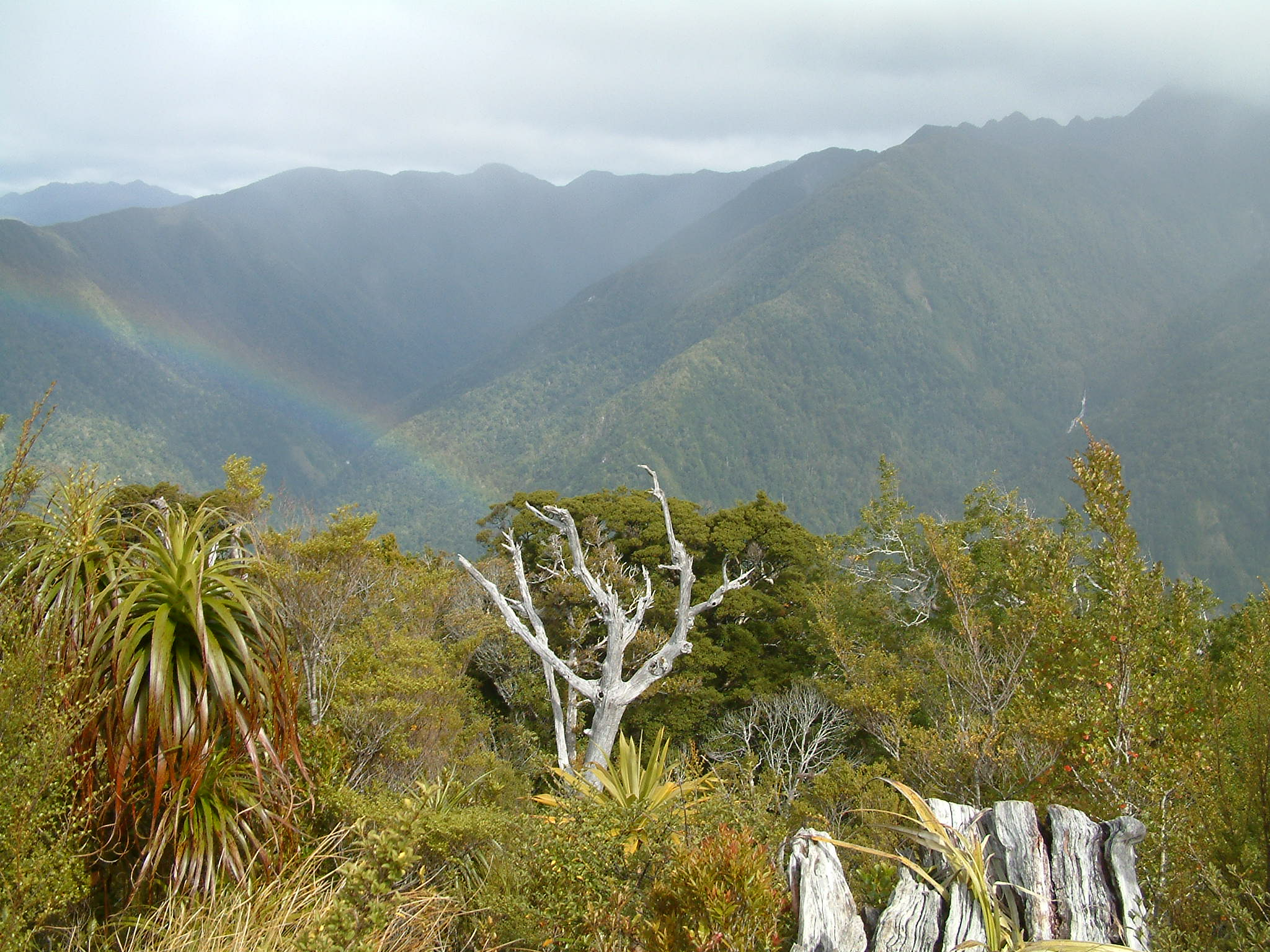
The view from the highest point of the track

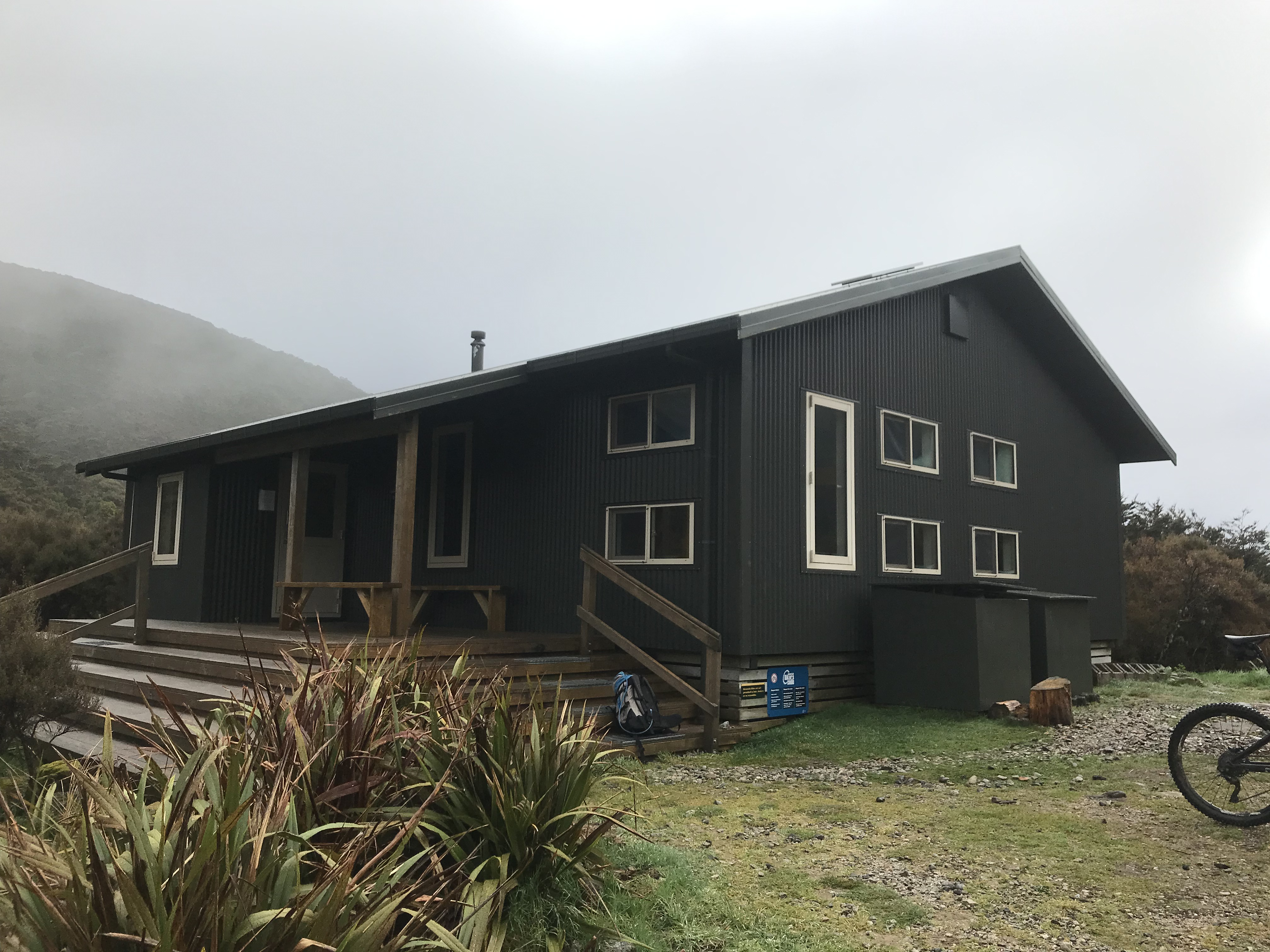
Perry Saddle Hut is near the highest point of the track

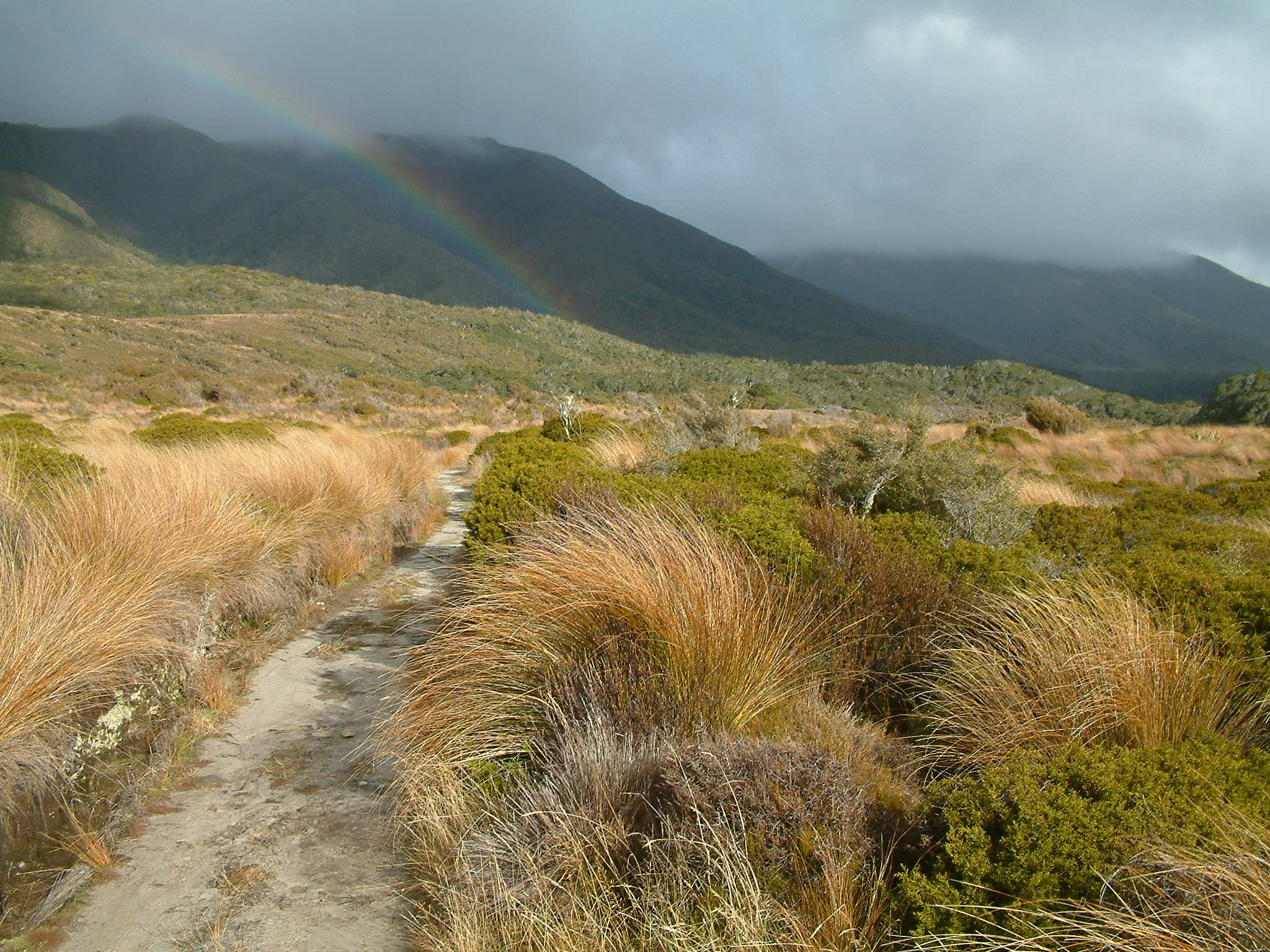
The Gouland Downs

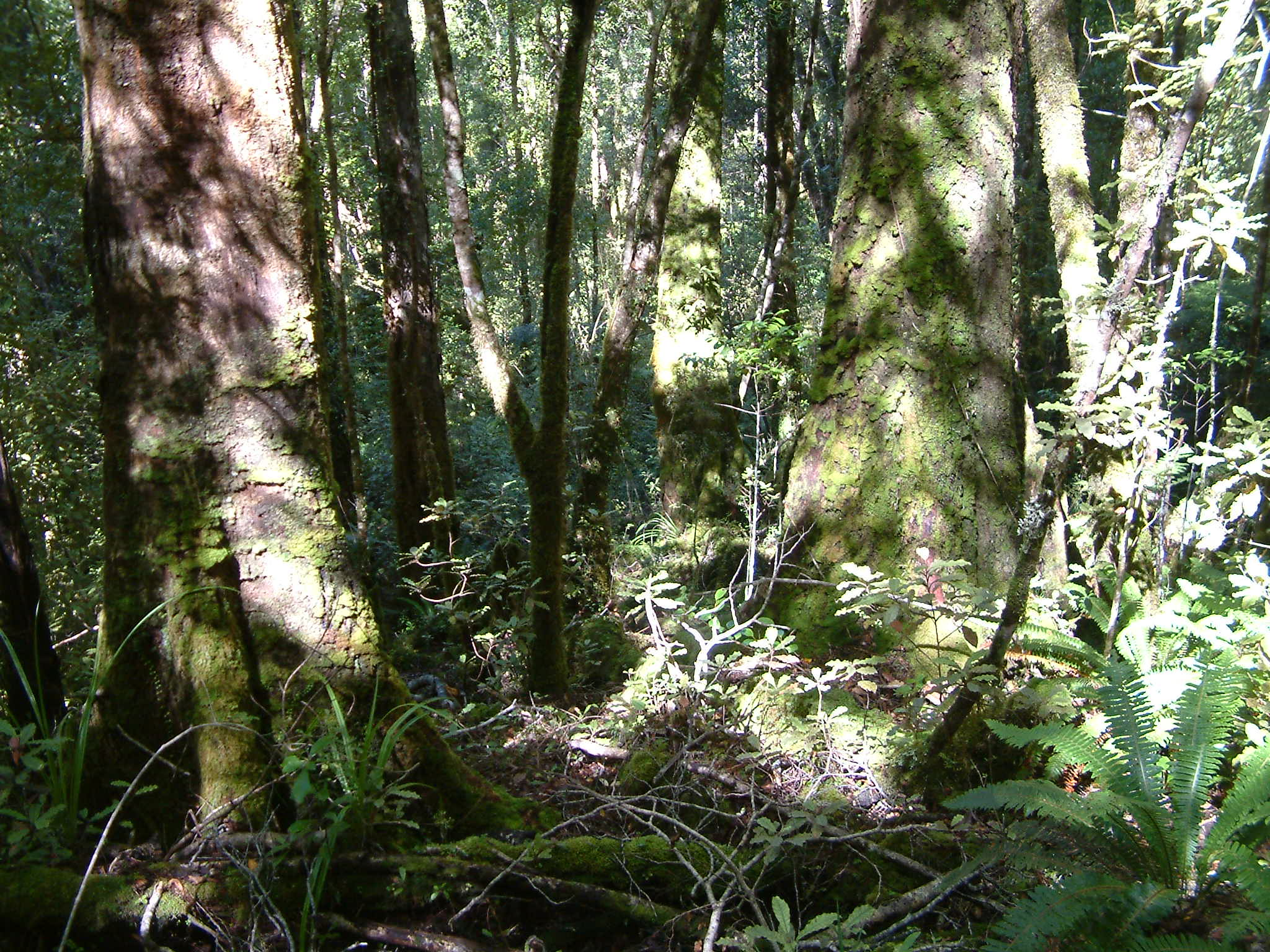
The forest west of Mackay hut

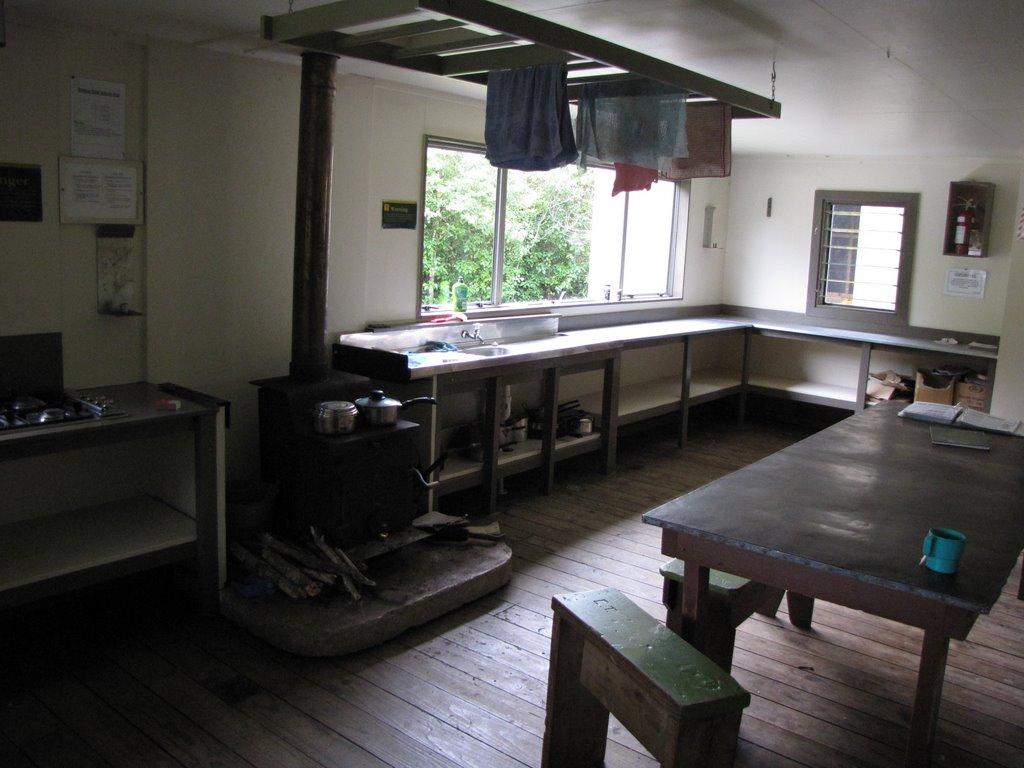
Interior of the Lewis Hut, which was removed some time after 2018

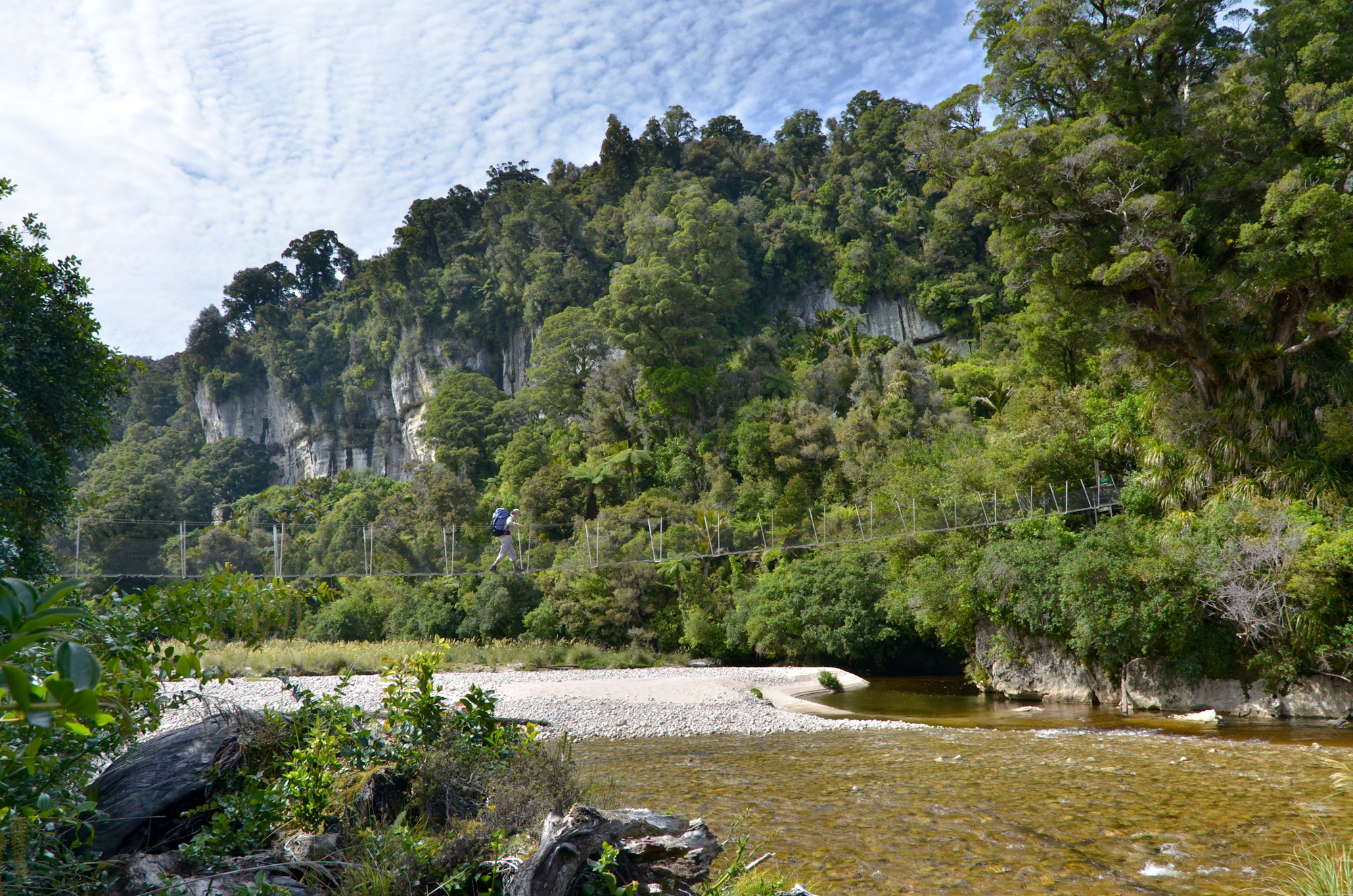
Swingbridge over the Gunner River, damaged in 2022 but repairable

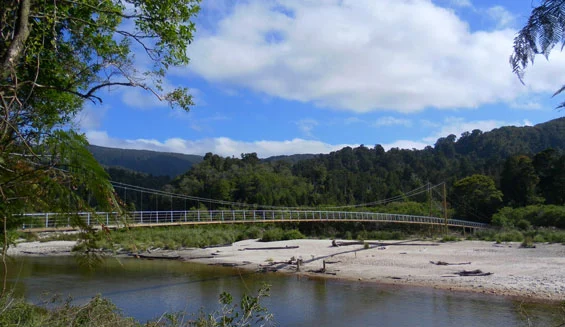
Heaphy River Bridge, destroyed in 2022

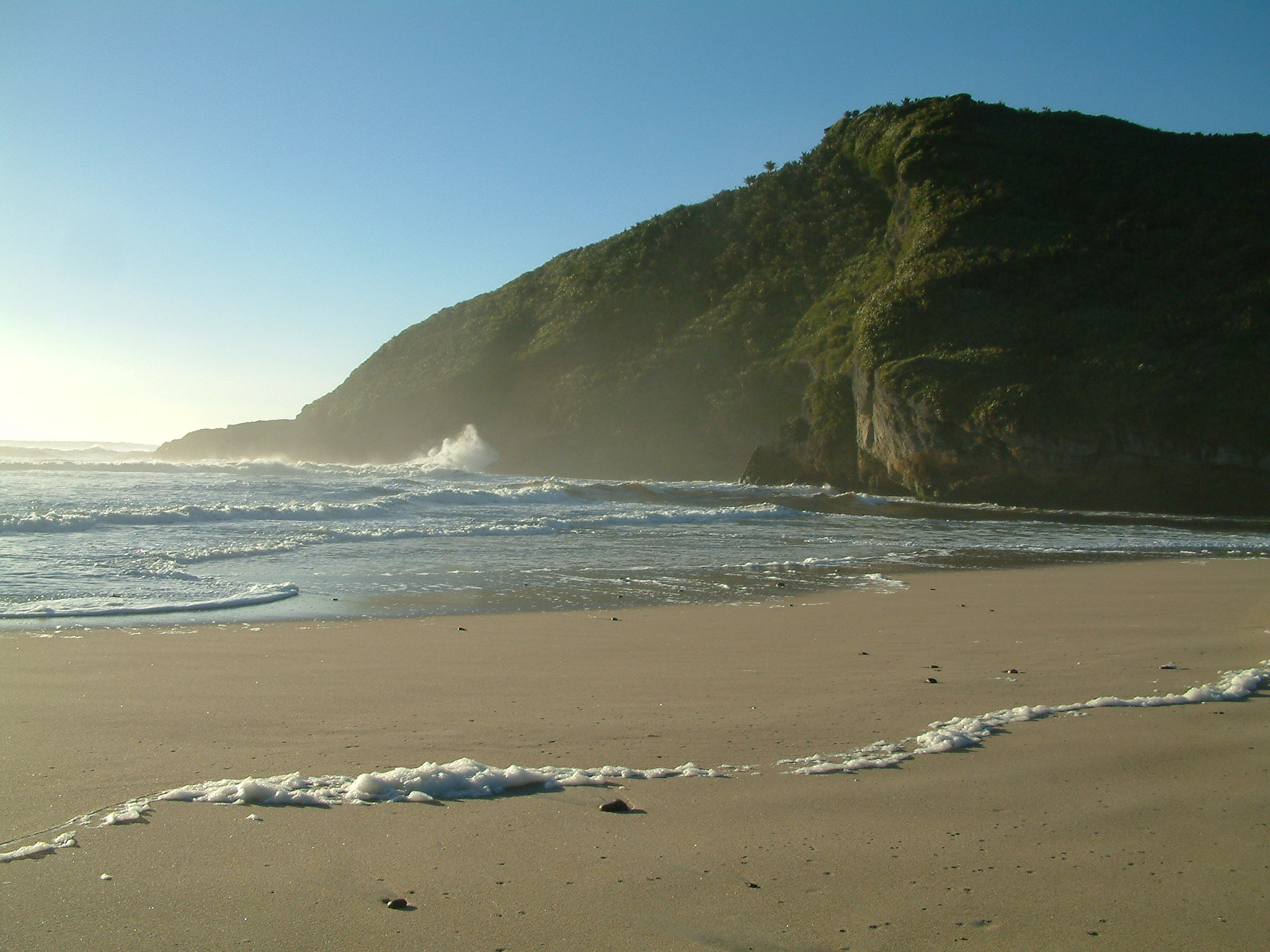
The Tasman Sea at the Heaphy River mouth

== See also ==
- New Zealand tramping tracks
- Tramping in New Zealand
