= Langford Store =

General store in Bainham, New Zealand

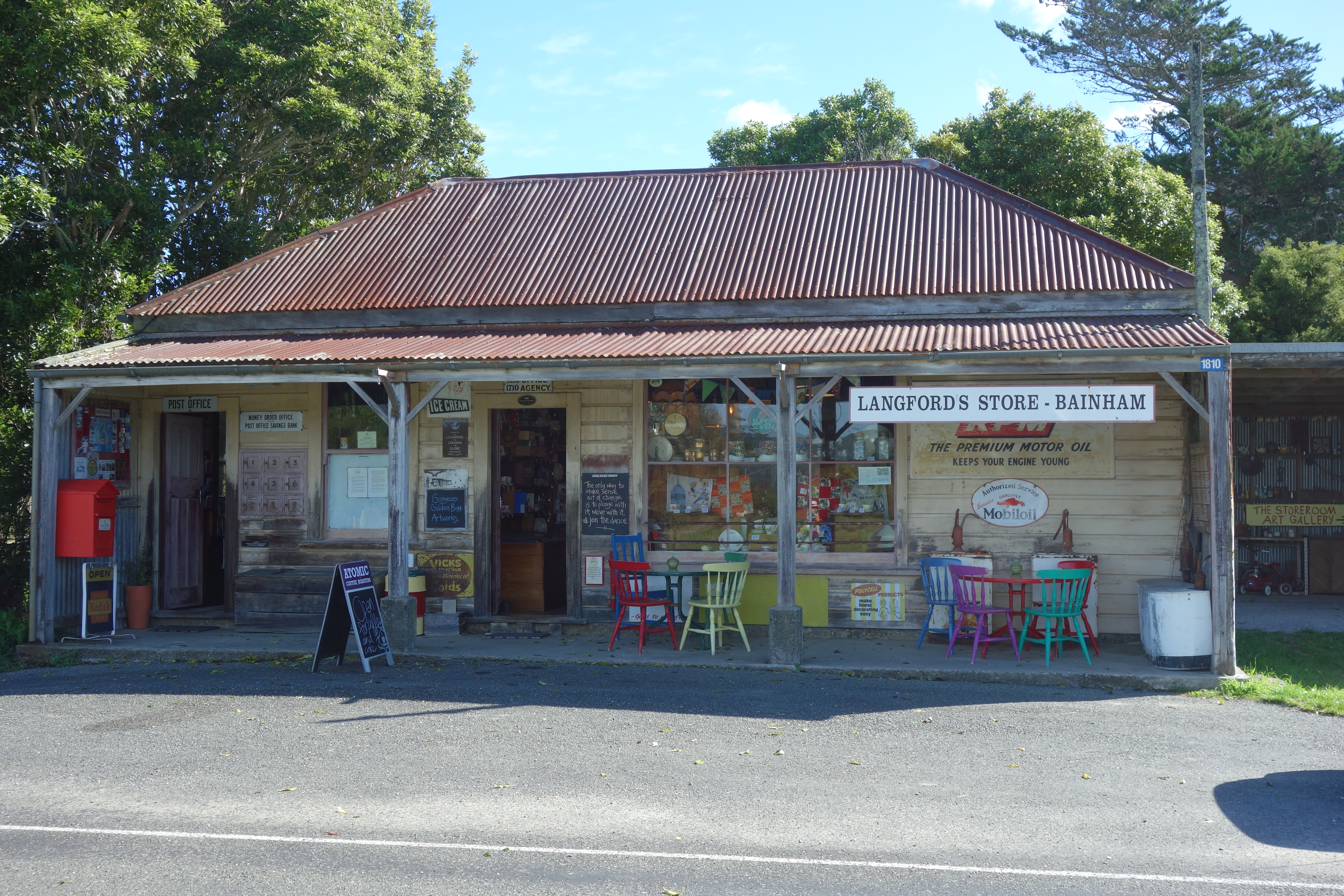
- Interactive map of the Langford Store area

General information
- Location: Bainham, New Zealand
- Coordinates: 40°45′52″S 172°33′47″E
- Completed: 1928

Design and construction
- Known for: General store

Website
- www.langfordstore.co.nz

Heritage New Zealand – Category 2
- Designated: 12 December 1990
- Reference no.: 5110

Langford Store, also known as the Bainham Store and until 2009 as Langford's Store, is a historic general store at Bainham in the Tasman District of the South Island, New Zealand. A new combined post office and general store at Bainham was built in 1928 by the local postmaster, Edward Bates Langford. He leased part of the building to the Post Office and Telegraph Department to provide postal services, while using the remainder as a store.

== Description ==
The Langford Store maintains a russet 1920s appearance. It is a combined post office and general store, once a common sight in rural New Zealand but has become rare.

The Langford Store's floor is constructed from concrete slabs, the cladding is timber, and the roofing is galvanised corrugated iron. Tongue and groove boards are used to line the interior.

== History ==
Edward Bates Langford was postmaster of the area since 1923. In 1925 a proposal to construct to a new post office was put forward but Langford suggested that he would build a combined general store and post office with the post office being leased from Langford. The Post Office Department agreed to this plan and a building was erected in 1928.

Lorna Langford started working for the store in 1947 doing basic tasks for her grandfather, Edward. Lorna took over as postmistress in 1952 and the running of the general store in 1954. She ran the businesses until retiring in either 2008 or 2009 (Note: Her obituary published by Stuff states she retired in 2009 while in Heritage Quarterly and on the Heritage New Zealand website it says she retired in 2008), when Sukhita Langford, Edward's great granddaughter, moved from Wellington to take over the store. Lorna Langford died in 2020.

Under Sukhita's management the store became an art gallery and café.

The building was accorded historic place category 2 listing by Heritage New Zealand in 1990, and has become a tourist attraction in its own right.

So far, three generations of the Langford family have operated the store.
