= Gunner River =

River in Kahurangi National Park, New Zealand

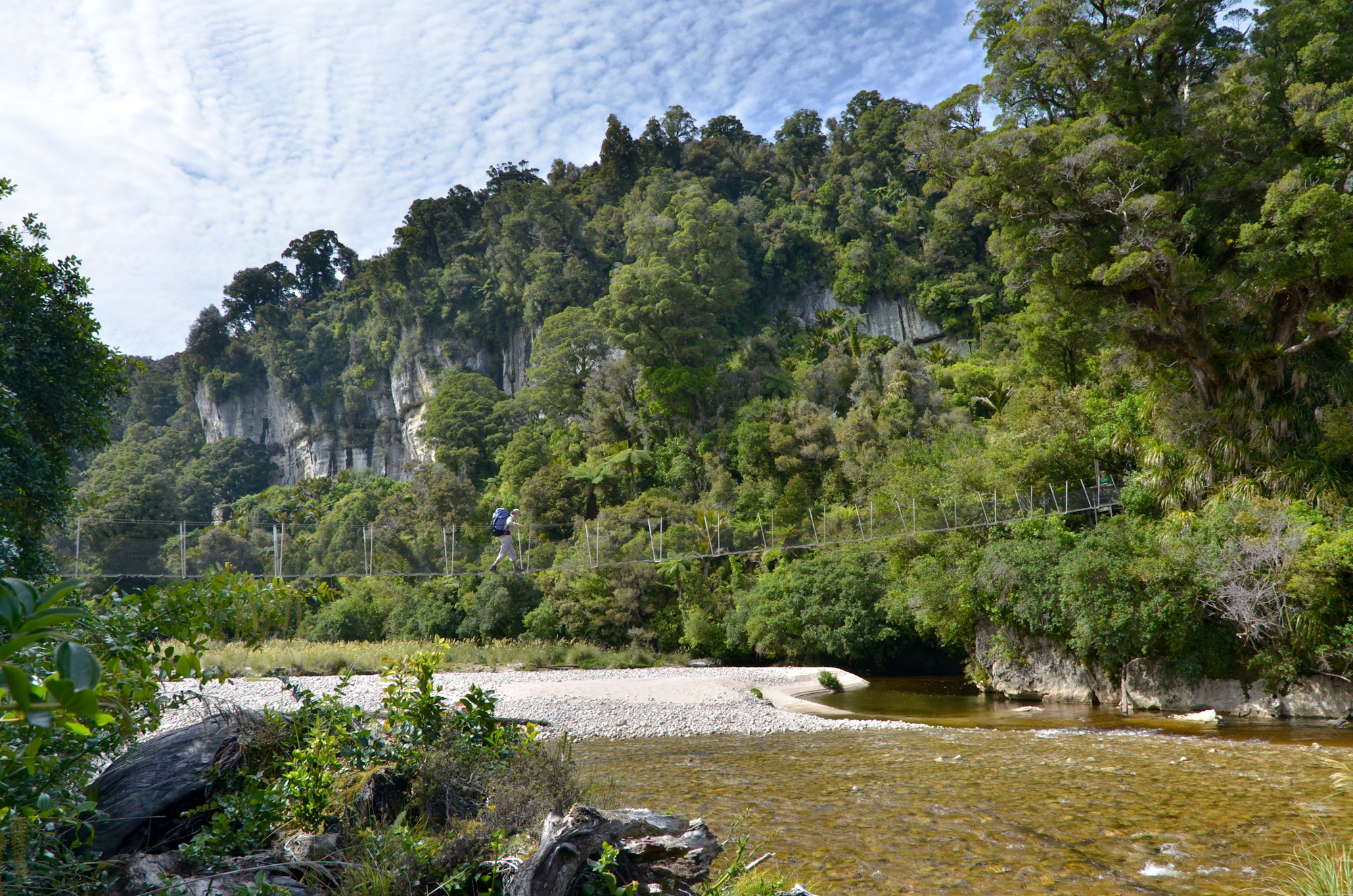
- Swingbridge across the Gunner River
- Route of the Gunner River
- Mouth of the Gunner River Gunner River (South Island)

Location
- Country: New Zealand

Physical characteristics
- Source
  - coordinates: 41°00′13″S 172°15′02″E
- Mouth
  - location: Heaphy River
  - coordinates: 40°57′28″S 172°08′12″E

Basin features
- Progression: Gunner River → Heaphy River → Karamea Bight → Tasman Sea
- Tributaries
  - right: Ryan Creek

The Gunner River is a river on the West Coast of New Zealand. It rises in the Domett Range in the Kahurangi National Park and flows north-west into the Heaphy River, which flows into the Tasman Sea.

A swingbridge crosses the river near its junction with the Heaphy. This bridge is part of the Heaphy Track. Heavy rain in the Buller District in February 2022 caused significant damage. The suspension bridge over the Gunner River was damaged but was deemed repairable, while the Pitt Creek bridge was swept away, and the suspension bridge over the Heaphy River was destroyed. The track re-opened in October 2023, after the replacement of bridges and restoration of tracks damaged in the 2022 floods.

== See also ==
- List of rivers of New Zealand
