= Scotts Beach =

Beach in New Zealand

- Beach
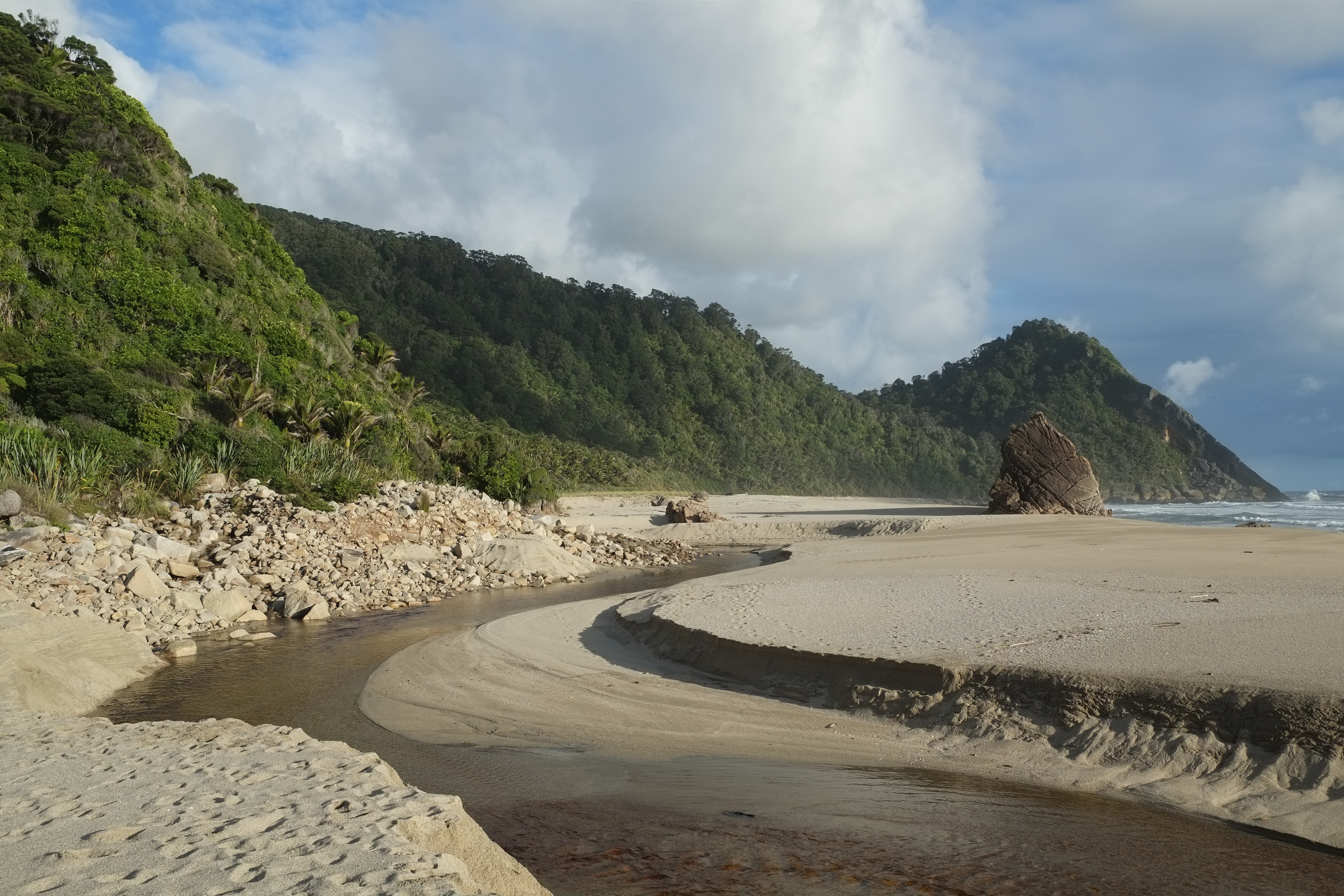
- Stream at Scotts Beach

- Coordinates: 41°05′17″S 172°06′15″E
- Location: West Coast Region
- Offshore water bodies: Tasman Sea

Dimensions
  - Length: 1.2 kilometres (0.75 mi)

Scotts Beach is a beach on the West Coast of the South Island of New Zealand. It is on the route of the Heaphy Track within Kahurangi National Park, and is around 3 km (1.9 mi) from the road end at Kohaihai. The beach is sandy, and is surrounded by steep cliffs covered in rainforest vegetation. The route to the beach is along an inland track over the Kohaihai bluff to a saddle at around 100 m (330 ft) elevation. The track passes through stands of nikau palms.

There is a small campsite at the beach. Scotts Beach has been described as one of the great scenic attractions of the Heaphy Track.
