= Kōhaihai River =

River in New Zealand

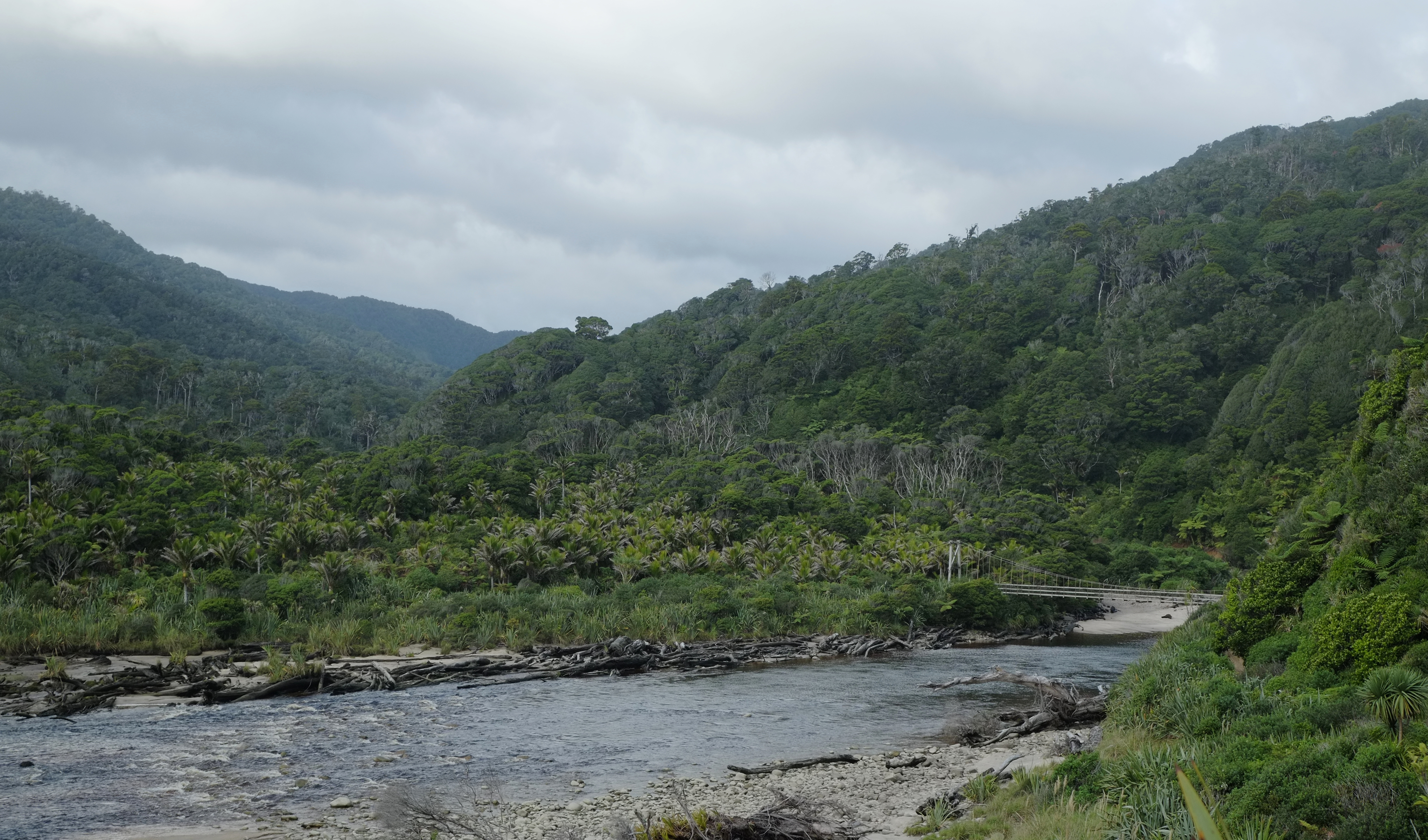
- Kōhaihai River at the end of Heaphy Track
- Route of the Kōhaihai River
- Mouth of the Kōhaihai River Kōhaihai River (South Island)
- Native name: Kōwhaiwhai (Māori)

Location
- Country: New Zealand

Physical characteristics
- Source: Dommett Range
  - location: 1,302 metres (4,272 ft)
  - coordinates: 41.0558°S 172.2666°E
- Mouth
  - location: Karamea Bight
  - coordinates: 41°06′26″S 172°06′01″E
  - elevation: 0 metres (0 ft)
- Length: 17 kilometres (11 mi)

Basin features
- Progression: Kōhaihai River → Karamea Bight → Tasman Sea

The Kōhaihai River (Māori: Kōwhaiwhai) is a river of the northwest of New Zealand's South Island. Flowing southwest and then west from the Dommett Range, the river's entire length is within the Kahurangi National Park. The river's mouth marks the south western end of the Heaphy Track and the northern terminus of the West Coast's road system. The nearest town is Karamea.

== See also ==
- List of rivers of New Zealand
