= Heaphy River =

River in Kahurangi National Park, New Zealand

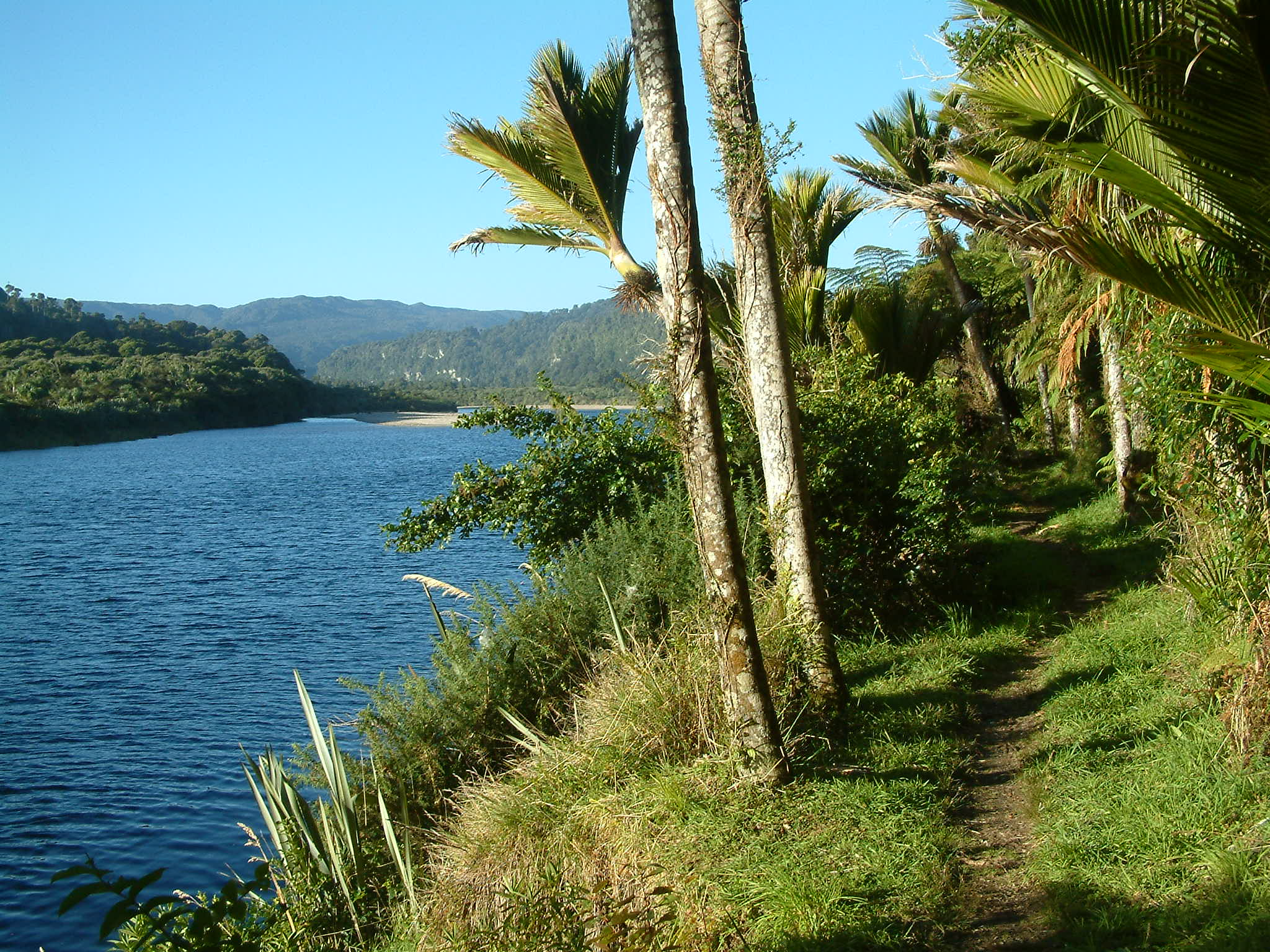
- Nikau palms along the Heaphy River
- Route of the Lewis River
- Mouth of the Lewis River Heaphy River (South Island)

Location
- Country: New Zealand

Physical characteristics
- Source
  - location: Domett Range
  - coordinates: 41°01′51″S 172°14′26″E
- Mouth
  - location: Karamea Bight
  - coordinates: 40°59′12″S 172°06′18″E
- Length: 26 kilometres (16 mi)

Basin features
- Progression: Heaphy River → Karamea Bight → Tasman Sea
- Tributaries
  - left: Campsaddle Creek, Gunner River, Murray Creek, Pitt Creek
  - right: Gouland Creek, Landing Creek, Bluffy Creek, Deception Creek, Lewis River, Blackwater Creek,

The Heaphy River is a river of the northwestern South Island of New Zealand. It flows through Kahurangi National Park, rising on the northern slopes of Amohia Peak and initially flowing northwest before turning southwest to reach the Tasman Sea 30 kilometres north of Karamea. Stages of the Heaphy Track follow the lower course of this river, with the track reaching the coast at the river's mouth. The Heaphy River is located in the Buller District.

The river is named for Charles Heaphy, a soldier who explored the area in the 1840s.

Tributaries to the Heaphy River that are named "river" are (source to sea) the Lewis River and the Gunner River.

A 147 m (482 ft) long suspension bridge was built across the Heaphy River in 2013 as part of the route of the Heaphy Track. At the time, the bridge was the longest of its type in the country. The bridge deck was 6.5 m (21 ft) above the normal level of the river. During a severe flood in early February 2022, the bridge was damaged beyond repair, cutting access along the Heaphy Track. The track re-opened in October 2023, after the replacement of several bridges and restoration of tracks damaged in the 2022 floods.

== See also ==
- List of rivers of New Zealand
