= Kahurangi River =

River in New Zealand

- Route of the Kahurangi River
- Mouth of the Kahurangi River Kahurangi River (South Island)

Location
- Country: New Zealand

Physical characteristics
- Source
  - coordinates: 40°51′00″S 172°13′21″E
- Mouth
  - location: Tasman Sea
  - coordinates: 40°47′22″S 172°12′44″E
- Length: 8 kilometres (5.0 mi)

Basin features
- Progression: Kahurangi River → Tasman Sea

The Kahurangi River is a short river in the northwest of New Zealand's South Island. It flows through the northwest of the Kahurangi National Park, reaching the Tasman Sea just to the south of Kahurangi Point.

== See also ==
- List of rivers of New Zealand
