= Saxon River =

River in Tasman District, New Zealand

- Route of the Saxon River
- Mouth of the Saxon River Saxon River (South Island)

Location
- Country: New Zealand

Physical characteristics
- Source
  - coordinates: 40°53′20″S 172°18′35″E
- Mouth
  - location: Big River
  - coordinates: 40°50′10″S 172°15′56″E
- Length: 12 km (7.5 mi)

Basin features
- Progression: Saxon River → Big River → Tasman Sea
- Tributaries
  - left: Blue Duck Creek

The Saxon River is a river of the Tasman Region of New Zealand's South Island. It flows northwest to reach the Big River 10 kilometres or 6.2 miles southeast off Kahurangi Point. The Saxon river's entire length is within Kahurangi National Park.

== See also ==
- List of rivers of New Zealand
