= Conservation Council =

Conservation Council may refer to:

- Conservation Council of Nations, international network created by the International Conservation Caucus Foundation
- Conservation Council of South Australia, or Conservation SA, peak body for conservation groups in South Australia
- Conservation Council of Western Australia, peak body for conservation groups in Western Australia
- Environment Victoria, formerly Conservation Council of Victoria, peak body for conservation groups in Victoria, Australia

== See also ==
- Nature Conservation Council, a former New Zealand government agency
- Nature Conservancy Council, a former British government agency
