= Kahurangi (given name) =

Kahurangi is a given name. Notable people with the name include:

- Kahurangi Carter (born 1983 or 1984), New Zealand politician
- Kahurangi Peters (born 1994), New Zealand rugby league footballer
- Kahurangi Taylor (born 1991), New Zealand model
- Kahurangi Waititi (born 1982), New Zealand netball player
