= Big River (Tasman) =

River in Tasman District, New Zealand

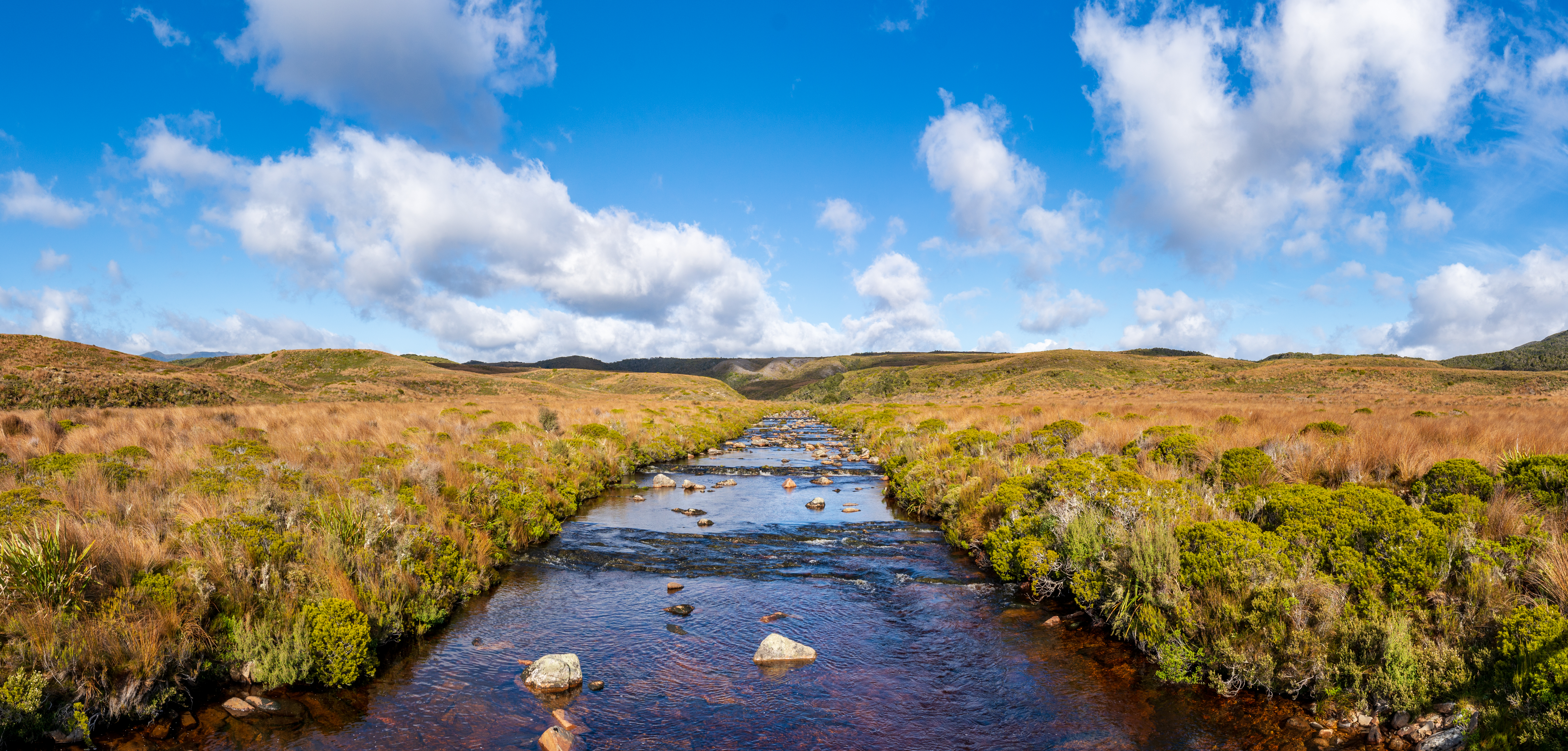
- Big River, as seen from the Heaphy Track
- Route of Big River
- Mouth of the Big River Big River (Tasman) (South Island)

Location
- Country: New Zealand

Physical characteristics
- Source
  - location: Tubman Hill
  - coordinates: 40°55′16″S 172°17′41″E
- Mouth
  - location: Tasman Sea
  - coordinates: 40°45′57″S 172°15′28″E
  - elevation: 0 metres (0 ft)
- Length: 28 kilometres (17 mi)

Basin features
- Progression: Big River → Tasman Sea
- Tributaries
  - left: Weka Creek, Saxon River, Juno Creek
  - right: Tasmanian Creek, Shiner Brook, Cave Brook, Sheep Creek, Corkscrew Creek, Lilian Creek, Vesta Creek, Slip Stream, Pallas Stream, Ceres Creek

The Big River, Awaruata in Māori, is a river in the Tasman District of the South Island of New Zealand. It rises on the slopes of Tubman Hill, elevation 897 metres (2,943 ft) in the Wakamarama Range. It flows northwest then north to the Tasman Sea. Big River is an official name.

A 10.4 m (34 ft) bridge carries the Heaphy Track over the river in its upper reaches. A 2009 survey found that on average there was a whio for every 2.2 km (1.4 mi) of river.

In 1836 Harriet anchored at Awaruata, 2 km (1.2 mi) north of Kahurangi Point, to land a gang from Te Awaiti whaling station. The river is navigable inland for about 2 km (1.2 mi), until it meets a long cascade through large boulders, which stretches back almost to the Pallas Stream, about 50 m (160 ft) above.

== See also ==
- List of rivers of New Zealand
