= Federated Mountain Clubs of New Zealand =

Environmental protection organization

The Federated Mountain Clubs of New Zealand (Inc) (commonly referred to by its acronym, FMC), is a New Zealand environment and conservation NGO.

It is the only national association of over 95 tramping, mountain climbing clubs and schools. Membership, both financial and associated, is currently 23,856. It was founded in 1931 by existing tramping clubs uniting to fight possible threats to New Zealand's mountain and forested areas. FMC has continued since then to actively:

- promote membership of Clubs as a means of enjoying the outdoors
- advocacy on access issues related to New Zealand's outdoors
- liaise with Government Ministries and NGO's on all matters related to the outdoors
