= Nature Conservation Council =

Former New Zealand government agency

The Nature Conservation Council was a New Zealand government agency that existed from 1962 to 1990.

It was set up largely in response to the increasing opposition to a hydro-electricity scheme that was being planned at that stage for Lake Manapouri.

== See also ==
- Conservation Council (disambiguation)
