= Bainham =

Locality in Tasman District, New Zealand

- locality
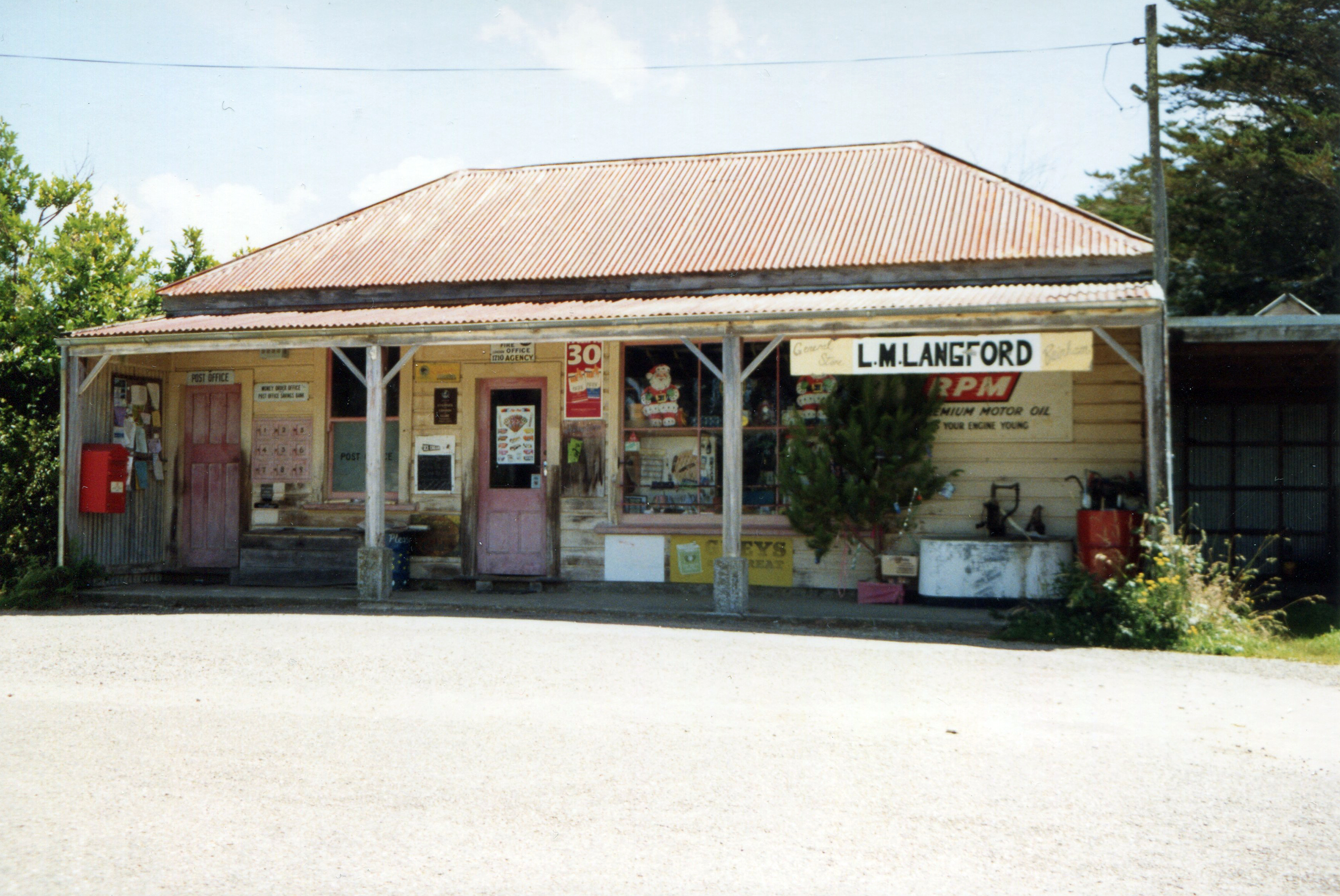
- Langford's Store, Bainham, in 1992
- Interactive map of Bainham
- Coordinates: 40.764°S 172.569°E
- Country: New Zealand
- Territorial authority: Tasman
- Ward: Golden Bay Ward
- Electorates: West Coast-Tasman; Te Tai Tonga

Government
  - Territorial Authority: Tasman District Council
  - Mayor of Tasman: Tim King
  - Nelson MP: Rachel Boyack
  - Te Tai Tonga MP: Tākuta Ferris

Area
  - Total: 736.24 km^{2} (284.26 sq mi)

Population (2023 census)
  - Total: 147
  - Density: 0.200/km^{2} (0.517/sq mi)
- Time zone: UTC+12 (NZST)
  - Summer (DST): UTC+13 (NZDT)
- Postcode: 7054, 7073
- Area code: 03

Bainham is a settlement in the Tasman District of New Zealand. Originally called Riverdale, it is located inland from Golden Bay, 14 kilometres (8.7 mi) southwest of Collingwood.

Located in the Aorere valley, Bainham is situated on the northwestern side of the Aorere River. The settlement was originally called Riverdale, but when a post office was established there in 1896, a name change was required to avoid confusion with similarly named places, including Riversdale in Southland and Riverdale in Gisborne. The chosen name, Bainham, is a portmanteau of the surnames of two of the first European families to settle in the area, Bain and Graham. A telegraph office opened at Bainham in 1898.

In 1906, the population of Bainham was over 100, with the main activities in the area being dairy farming, gold mining in the Quartz Ranges, further up the Aorere River, and timber milling.

Bainham School opened in 1886 and closed in 1969. Students then went to Rockville School (1879 to 1994) in the lower Aorere valley.

A new combined post office and general store was built in 1928 by the local postmaster, Edward Bates Langford. He leased part of the building to the Post Office and Telegraph Department to provide postal services, while using the remainder as a store. Langford's granddaughter, Lorna Langford, took over as postmistress in 1952 and the running of the general store in 1954. She ran the businesses until retiring in 2009. Lorna Langford died in 2020. The building was accorded historic place category 2 listing by Heritage New Zealand in 1990, and has become a tourist attraction in its own right.

Bainham is the nearest settlement to the northern end of the Heaphy Track, 14 kilometres (8.7 mi) to the southwest, and is a gateway to the Kahurangi National Park.

== Demographics ==
The upper Aorere valley, which includes Bainham, covers 736.24 km^{2} (284.26 sq mi). It is part of the Golden Bay / Mohua statistical area.

Historical population
Year	Pop.	±% p.a.
2006	123	—
2013	120	−0.35%
2018	117	−0.51%
2023	147	+4.67%

The upper valley had a population of 147 in the 2023 New Zealand census, an increase of 30 people (25.6%) since the 2018 census, and an increase of 27 people (22.5%) since the 2013 census. There were 75 males and 72 females in 69 dwellings. 4.1% of people identified as LGBTIQ+. The median age was 37.2 years (compared with 38.1 years nationally). There were 33 people (22.4%) aged under 15 years, 18 (12.2%) aged 15 to 29, 75 (51.0%) aged 30 to 64, and 21 (14.3%) aged 65 or older.

People could identify as more than one ethnicity. The results were 89.8% European (Pākehā); 20.4% Māori; 4.1% Middle Eastern, Latin American and African New Zealanders (MELAA); and 4.1% other, which includes people giving their ethnicity as "New Zealander". English was spoken by 98.0%, and other languages by 14.3%. The percentage of people born overseas was 18.4, compared with 28.8% nationally.

Religious affiliations were 8.2% Christian, and 2.0% New Age. People who answered that they had no religion were 83.7%, and 6.1% of people did not answer the census question.

Of those at least 15 years old, 12 (10.5%) people had a bachelor's or higher degree, 72 (63.2%) had a post-high school certificate or diploma, and 24 (21.1%) people exclusively held high school qualifications. The median income was $33,300, compared with $41,500 nationally. 3 people (2.6%) earned over $100,000 compared to 12.1% nationally. The employment status of those at least 15 was 57 (50.0%) full-time and 27 (23.7%) part-time.
