= Turimawiwi River =

River in Tasman District, New Zealand

- Route of the Turimawiwi River
- Mouth of the Turimawiwi River Turimawiwi River (South Island)

Location
- Country: New Zealand

Physical characteristics
- Source
  - location: Wakamarama Range
  - coordinates: 40°49′52″S 172°24′26″E
- Mouth
  - location: Tasman Sea
  - coordinates: 40°43′52″S 172°18′54″E
  - elevation: 0 metres (0 ft)
- Length: 15 kilometres (9.3 mi)

Basin features
- Progression: Turimawiwi River → Tasman Sea
- Tributaries
  - left: Toucan Stream, Jackson Stream
  - right: Pukatea Stream

The Turimawiwi River is a river of the Tasman Region of New Zealand's South Island. It flows northwest from the Wakamarama Range 40 kilometres southwest of Cape Farewell.

== See also ==
- List of rivers of New Zealand
