= Kahurangi Point =

Point in New Zealand

Coordinates: 40.7749°S 172.2192°E

Kahurangi Point is a headland on the West Coast of New Zealand's South Island, overlooking the Tasman Sea. It is located in Kahurangi National Park between Karamea and Farewell Spit.

Kahurangi Point is traditionally regarded as the northernmost point of the West Coast region, although for most purposes it is considered part of the Tasman District region.

A lighthouse was built in 1903, automated in 1926, staff removed in 1960 and replaced with an LED beacon in 2007. The materials for the building were shipped to Big River about 2 mi (3.2 km) to the north, then carted along the beach and hauled up a light tramway. The keeper's house is now a Department of Conservation hut.

The Kahurangi upwelling system makes the area rich in oceanic biodiversity and the waters off Kahurangi Point is one of areas being frequented by pygmy blue whales along with off South Taranaki Bight which was discovered in 2007 and was confirmed in 2014.
