= Karamea Bight =

Coordinates: 41°30′S 171°40′E

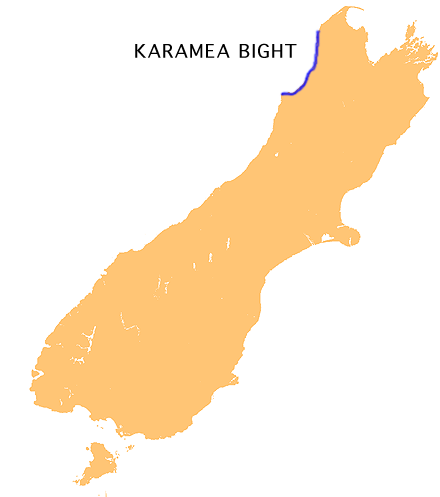
Location of Karamea Bight

The Karamea Bight is the name given to a large bay in the Tasman Sea formed by a curved stretch of the West Coast of New Zealand's South Island. It stretches for 100 kilometres north from Cape Foulwind to just north of the mouth of the Heaphy River.
