= Waitangi =

Waitangi may refer to:

- Waitangi, Northland, New Zealand, where the Treaty of Waitangi was signed
- Waitangi, Chatham Islands, New Zealand

== See also ==
- Treaty of Waitangi, a New Zealand constitutional document
- Waitangi Day, a New Zealand public holiday
- Waitangi Day Acts, two acts passed by the New Zealand Parliament in 1960 and 1976
- Waitangi Park, recreation space in Wellington, New Zealand
- Waitangi Treaty Monument, Paihia, New Zealand
- Waitangi Tribunal, a New Zealand permanent commission of inquiry
- Waitangi River (disambiguation)
