= Rangitane, New Zealand =

Rangitane
- Interactive map of Rangitane
- Coordinates: 35.196°S 174.000°E
- Country: New Zealand
- Region: Northland Region
- District: Far North District
- Ward: Bay of Islands/Whangaroa
- Community: Bay of Islands-Whangaroa
- Subdivision: Kerikeri
- Electorates: Northland; Te Tai Tokerau

Government
  - Territorial Authority: Far North District Council
  - Regional council: Northland Regional Council
  - Mayor of Far North: Moko Tepania
  - Northland MP: Grant McCallum
  - Te Tai Tokerau MP: Mariameno Kapa-Kingi

Area
  - Total: 3.30 km^{2} (1.27 sq mi)

Population (June 2025)
  - Total: 360
  - Density: 110/km^{2} (280/sq mi)

Rangitane or Rangitāne is a settlement on the east bank of the Rangitane River and the northern shore of the Kerikeri Inlet in the Far North District of New Zealand. It is 13 km north-west of Kerikeri by road.

In early 2021 an upgrade to the boat ramp and marine facilities at Rangitane was announced. The upgrade plan was approved for fast-track consenting in September but was put on hold in January 2022.

== Demographics ==
Statistics New Zealand describes Rangitāne as a rural settlement. It covers 3.30 km^{2} (1.27 sq mi) and had an estimated population of 360 as of June 2025, with a population density of 109 people per km^{2}. Rangitāne is part of the larger Rangitane-Purerua statistical area.

Historical population
| Year | Pop. | ±% p.a. |
|---|---|---|
| 2006 | 264 | — |
| 2013 | 270 | +0.32% |
| 2018 | 351 | +5.39% |
| 2023 | 366 | +0.84% |
The 2006 population is for a larger area of 3.75 km^{2} Source:

Rangitāne had a population of 366 in the 2023 New Zealand census, an increase of 15 people (4.3%) since the 2018 census, and an increase of 96 people (35.6%) since the 2013 census. There were 183 males and 183 females in 144 dwellings. 0.8% of people identified as LGBTIQ+. The median age was 51.7 years (compared with 38.1 years nationally). There were 66 people (18.0%) aged under 15 years, 24 (6.6%) aged 15 to 29, 186 (50.8%) aged 30 to 64, and 93 (25.4%) aged 65 or older.

People could identify as more than one ethnicity. The results were 92.6% European (Pākehā); 17.2% Māori; 4.1% Pasifika; 1.6% Asian; 2.5% Middle Eastern, Latin American and African New Zealanders (MELAA); and 3.3% other, which includes people giving their ethnicity as "New Zealander". English was spoken by 98.4%, Māori language by 2.5%, and other languages by 13.1%. No language could be spoken by 1.6% (e.g. too young to talk). New Zealand Sign Language was known by 0.8%. The percentage of people born overseas was 27.0, compared with 28.8% nationally.

Religious affiliations were 26.2% Christian, 0.8% Māori religious beliefs, 0.8% Buddhist, 0.8% New Age, and 2.5% other religions. People who answered that they had no religion were 62.3%, and 7.4% of people did not answer the census question.

Of those at least 15 years old, 60 (20.0%) people had a bachelor's or higher degree, 168 (56.0%) had a post-high school certificate or diploma, and 57 (19.0%) people exclusively held high school qualifications. The median income was $39,200, compared with $41,500 nationally. 33 people (11.0%) earned over $100,000 compared to 12.1% nationally. The employment status of those at least 15 was that 129 (43.0%) people were employed full-time, 42 (14.0%) were part-time, and 3 (1.0%) were unemployed.
