= Haruru, New Zealand =

Locality in New Zealand

Haruru
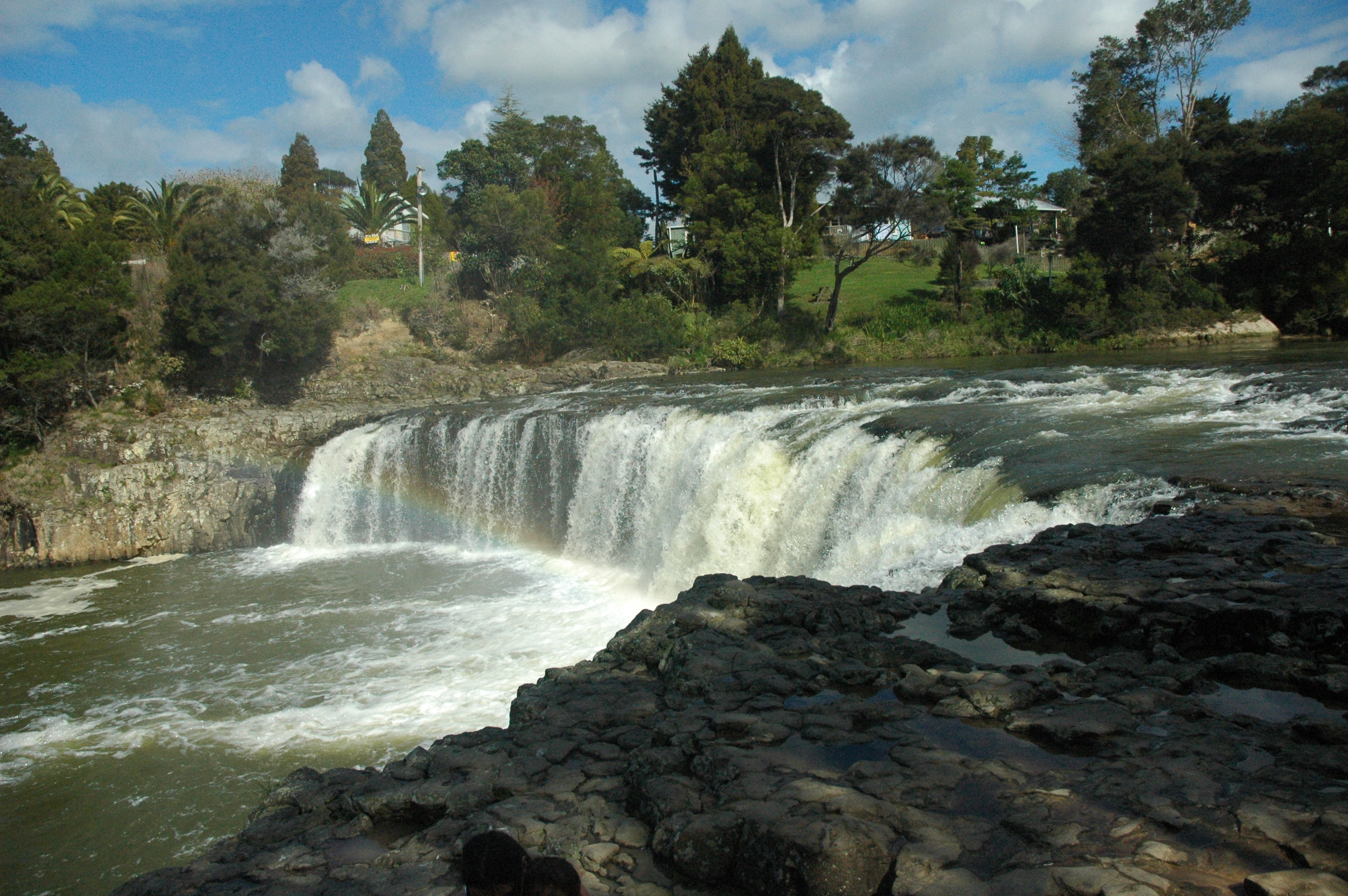
- Haruru Falls
- Interactive map of Haruru
- Coordinates: 35.281°S 174.058°E
- Country: New Zealand
- Region: Northland Region
- District: Far North District
- Ward: Bay of Islands-Whangaroa
- Community: Bay of Islands-Whangaroa
- Subdivision: Paihia
- Electorates: Northland; Te Tai Tokerau

Government
  - Territorial Authority: Far North District Council
  - Regional council: Northland Regional Council
  - Mayor of Far North: Moko Tepania
  - Northland MP: Grant McCallum
  - Te Tai Tokerau MP: Mariameno Kapa-Kingi

Area
  - Total: 1.53 km^{2} (0.59 sq mi)

Population (June 2025)
  - Total: 1,210
  - Density: 791/km^{2} (2,050/sq mi)

Haruru is a residential and commercial locality in the Far North District of New Zealand. State Highway 11 runs through the locality. Puketona is 10 kilometres west, and Paihia is 4 kilometres east, The name means a continuous noise or roar in the Māori language, which refers to the sound of Haruru Falls, a five metre high broad waterfall about a kilometre away.

== History ==
The pool at the base of the falls was an early river port for Northland, with the Waitangi River providing access to the Bay of Islands. A hotel was built at Haruru in 1828, and a store was added to it about 1858. The hotel burned down in 1937. It may have been the first licensed hotel in New Zealand.

== Demographics ==
Haruru covers 1.53 km^{2} (0.59 sq mi) and had an estimated population of 1,210 as of June 2025, with a population density of 791 people per km^{2}.

Historical population
Year	Pop.	±% p.a.
2006	786	—
2013	867	+1.41%
2018	1,077	+4.43%
2023	1,179	+1.83%

Haruru had a population of 1,179 in the 2023 New Zealand census, an increase of 102 people (9.5%) since the 2018 census, and an increase of 312 people (36.0%) since the 2013 census. There were 582 males, 591 females and 3 people of other genders in 447 dwellings. 2.3% of people identified as LGBTIQ+. The median age was 48.8 years (compared with 38.1 years nationally). There were 210 people (17.8%) aged under 15 years, 138 (11.7%) aged 15 to 29, 510 (43.3%) aged 30 to 64, and 321 (27.2%) aged 65 or older.

People could identify as more than one ethnicity. The results were 78.1% European (Pākehā); 27.7% Māori; 3.8% Pasifika; 5.9% Asian; 1.5% Middle Eastern, Latin American and African New Zealanders (MELAA); and 1.5% other, which includes people giving their ethnicity as "New Zealander". English was spoken by 97.7%, Māori language by 7.6%, Samoan by 0.3% and other languages by 9.7%. No language could be spoken by 1.5% (e.g. too young to talk). New Zealand Sign Language was known by 0.3%. The percentage of people born overseas was 28.2, compared with 28.8% nationally.

Religious affiliations were 31.0% Christian, 1.0% Hindu, 2.5% Māori religious beliefs, 0.5% Buddhist, 0.3% New Age, and 1.5% other religions. People who answered that they had no religion were 56.7%, and 6.4% of people did not answer the census question.

Of those at least 15 years old, 141 (14.6%) people had a bachelor's or higher degree, 489 (50.5%) had a post-high school certificate or diploma, and 285 (29.4%) people exclusively held high school qualifications. The median income was $34,000, compared with $41,500 nationally. 54 people (5.6%) earned over $100,000 compared to 12.1% nationally. The employment status of those at least 15 was that 438 (45.2%) people were employed full-time, 141 (14.6%) were part-time, and 27 (2.8%) were unemployed.
