= Treaty House =

Historic building in New Zealand

- Whare Tiriti
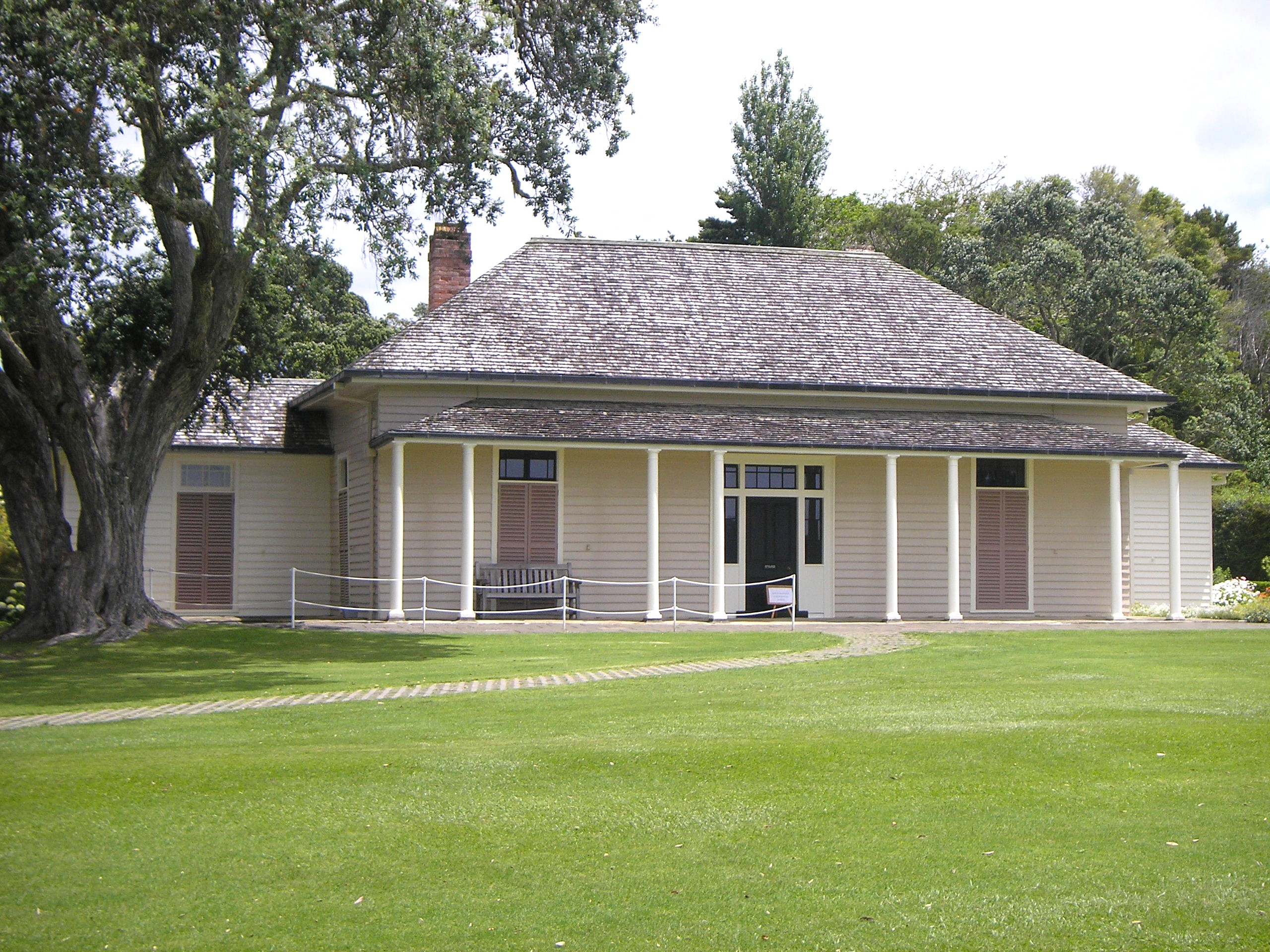
- The restored Treaty House (2006)
- Interactive map of the Treaty House area

General information
- Coordinates: 35.2658°S 174.0816°E

Heritage New Zealand – Category 1
- Designated: 23 June 1983
- Reference no.: 6

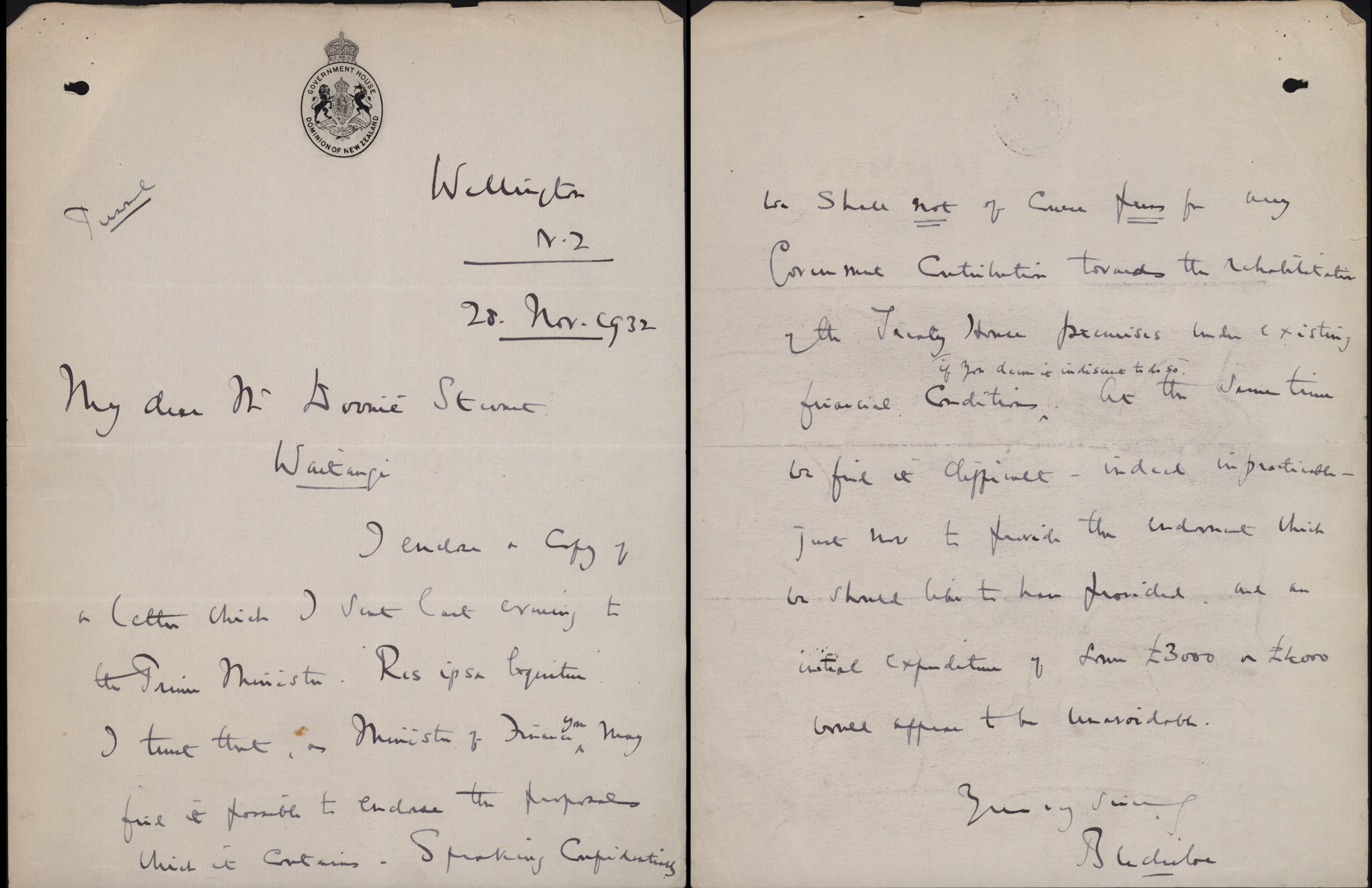
Charles Bathurst, 1st Viscount Bledisloe gifting Treaty House to the nation (1932)

The Treaty House (Māori: Whare Tiriti) at Waitangi in Northland, New Zealand, is the former house of the British Resident in New Zealand, James Busby. The Treaty of Waitangi, a document that established the British Colony of New Zealand and which holds importance in the country's national mythos, was signed in the grounds of the Treaty House on 6 February 1840.

The grounds had previously been the site of other important events, such as the signing of the Declaration of the Independence of New Zealand in 1835. The house and grounds remained in private hands until 1932, when they were purchased by Governor-General Viscount Bledisloe and donated to the nation. They were dedicated as a national reserve in 1934, in a ceremony attended by thousands of people, both Māori and Pākehā, and including the Māori King. It was the site of another major event in 1940, when the centenary of the Treaty signing was celebrated. From 1947 the grounds became the site of annual Waitangi Day celebrations.

== Architectural history ==
The Treaty House was built in 1833–34 for Busby and his family. It is one of New Zealand's oldest surviving buildings. Originally the building consisted of two main rooms, plus an entrance hallway, verandah, and a detached rear block containing a kitchen and servants' room. Busby considered the house to be too small for someone of his standing, but for 1830s New Zealand it was a large house. It was expanded in the 1830s and 1840s with the addition of a lean-to and two wings.

The property remained in the Busby family until 1882, when it was sold to a local farmer. For at least some of the next few years it was used for agricultural purposes, including shearing sheep. It fell into disrepair, despite some efforts to bring it into public ownership. These were successful in 1932, when Bledisloe made his purchase, and the house was subsequently restored by leading architect William Henry Gummer. This was one of the earliest major state restorations of a historic building in New Zealand. In preparation for the 1990 sesquicentennial of the Treaty signing, the house was modified to more accurately reflect what it would have been like in 1840.

== Heritage site and grounds ==
The Treaty House has been a Heritage New Zealand Category I listed building since 1983. It contains a museum devoted to the Treaty and to life in the house in the mid nineteenth century. The grounds contain a carved whare rūnanga (meeting house) and the large waka taua (war canoe) Ngā Toki Matawhaorua, both built for the 1940 celebrations. A flagstaff stands on the spot where the Treaty was signed. The original flagstaff was erected by the New Zealand Division of the Royal Navy just prior to the Waitangi Day celebrations of 1934. The Waitangi Treaty Monument, built circa 1880–1881 and also registered as a Category 1 heritage item, is located nearby.

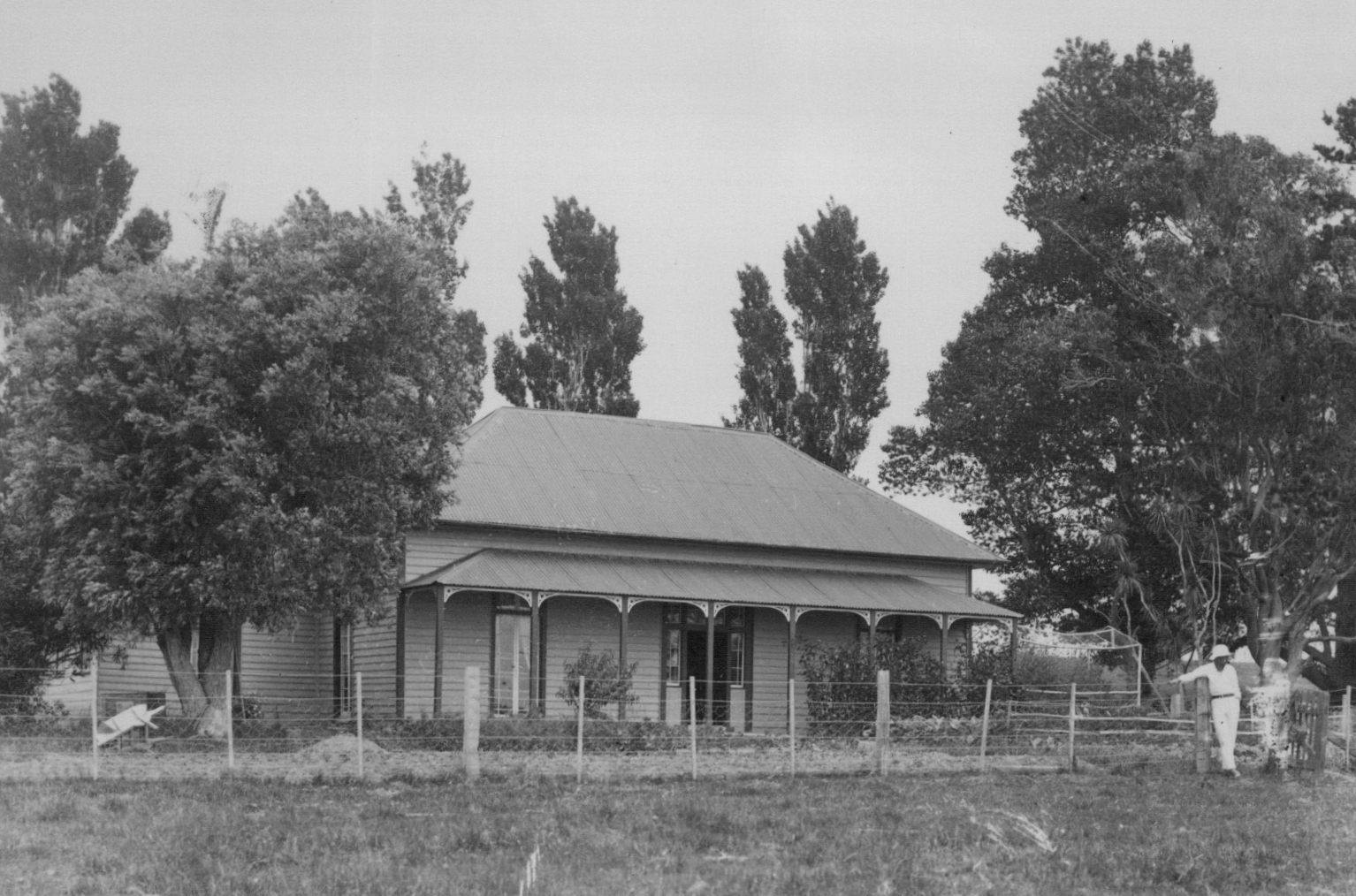
Treaty House photographed in 1912 by Henry Winkelmann

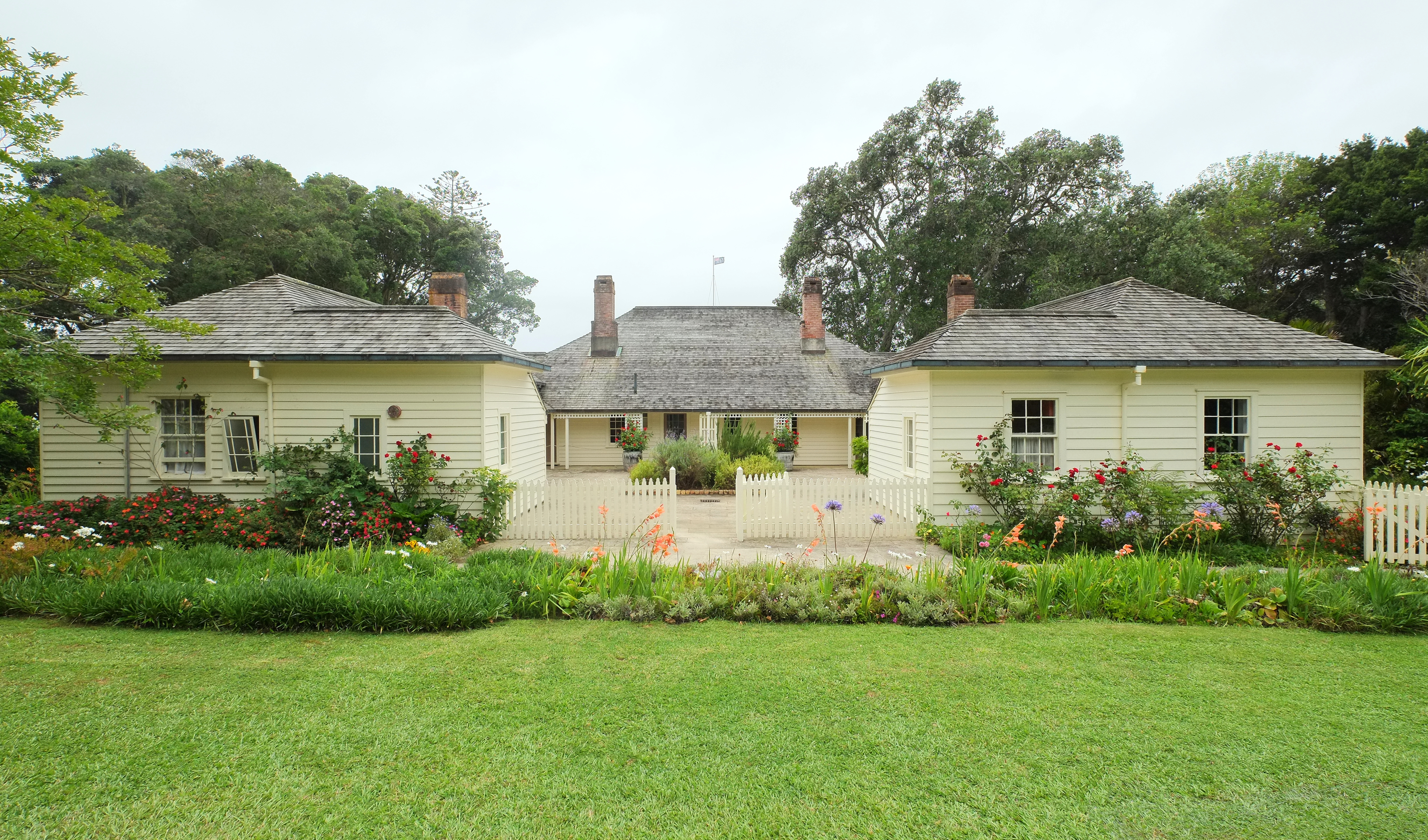
Treaty House from the back, showing the two wings added in the 1840s

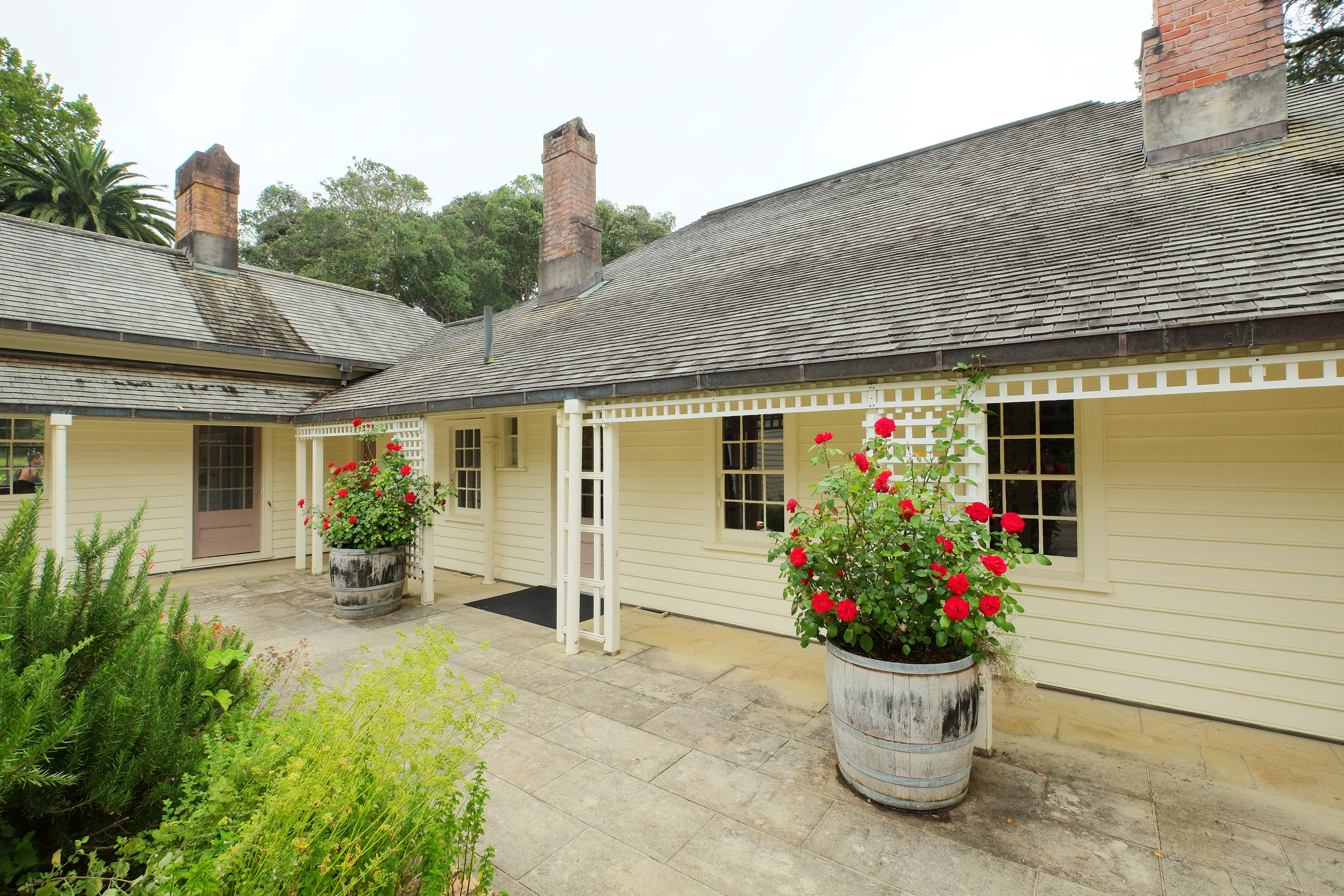
Courtyard at the back of the Treaty House

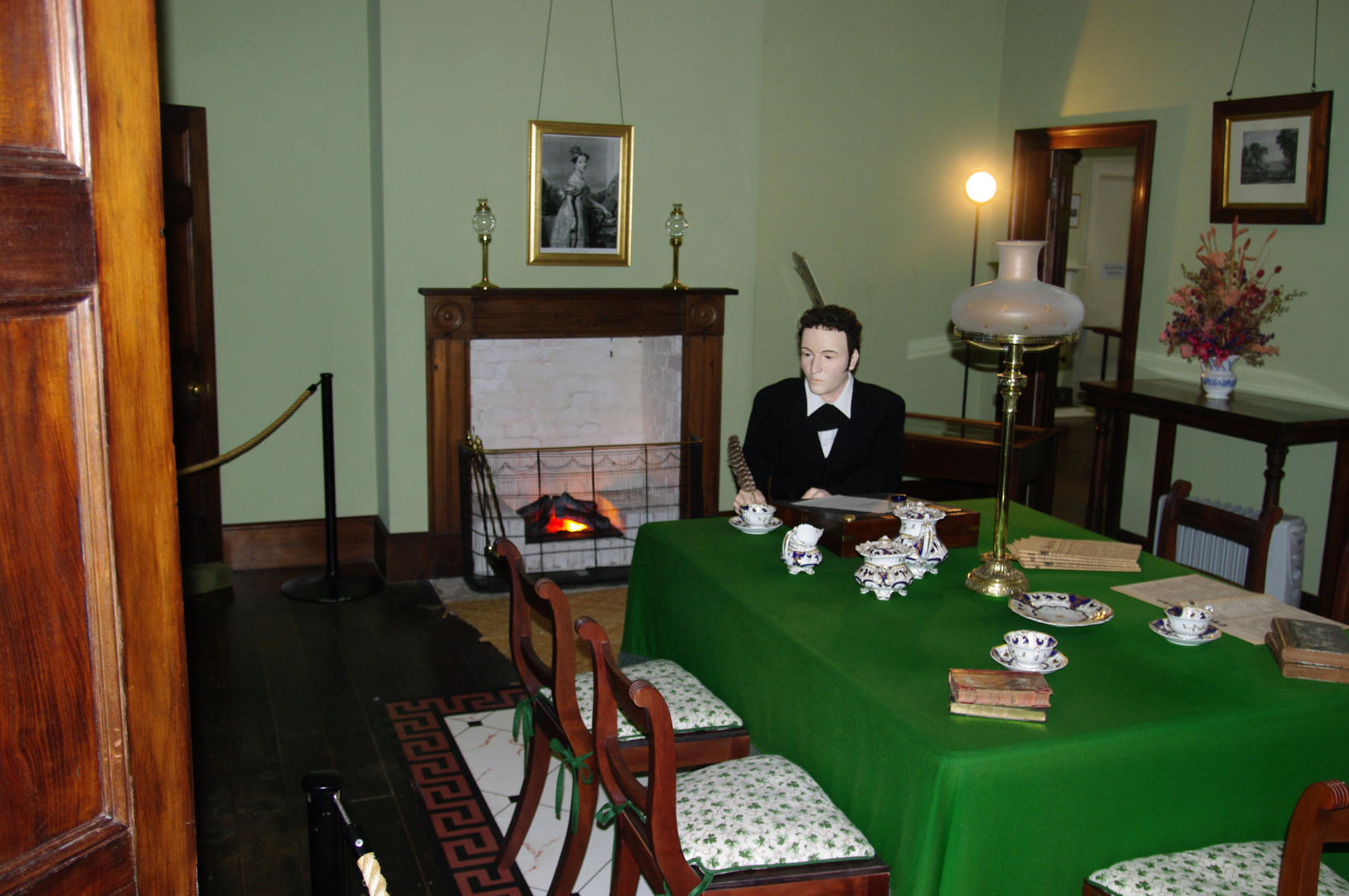
Recreation of the 19th-century interior of the house
