= Puketona =

Locality in New Zealand

- Interactive map of Puketona
- Coordinates: 35.303°S 173.962°E
- Country: New Zealand
- Region: Northland Region
- District: Far North District
- Ward: Bay of Islands/Whangaroa
- Community: Bay of Islands-Whangaroa
- Subdivision: Paihia
- Electorates: Northland; Te Tai Tokerau

Government
  - Territorial Authority: Far North District Council
  - Regional council: Northland Regional Council
  - Mayor of Far North: Moko Tepania
  - Northland MP: Grant McCallum
  - Te Tai Tokerau MP: Mariameno Kapa-Kingi

Puketona is a locality at the junction of State Highway 10 and State Highway 11 in the Far North District of New Zealand. Kerikeri is 10 kilometres north, Paihia is 14 kilometres east, Moerewa is 15 kilometres southeast, and Kaikohe is 20 kilometres southwest.

The name means vagina or vulva in the Māori language.

== Geography ==
There are six or seven small scoria cones around Puketona, one of which was host to Puketona Pā in the 18th century. Charles Darwin made observations of these cones in December 1835. The cones have been quarried since the 1950s.

== Demographics ==
The statistical area of Puketona-Waitangi also includes Waitangi and Kerikeri Inlet, and covers 161.07 km^{2} (62.19 sq mi). It had an estimated population of 1,600 as of June 2025, with a population density of 9.9 people per km^{2}.

Historical population
Year	Pop.	±% p.a.
2006	1,107	—
2013	1,161	+0.68%
2018	1,365	+3.29%
2023	1,515	+2.11%
The 2006 population is for a smaller area of 156.38 km^{2} Source:

Puketona-Waitangi had a population of 1,515 in the 2023 New Zealand census, an increase of 150 people (11.0%) since the 2018 census, and an increase of 354 people (30.5%) since the 2013 census. There were 789 males and 726 females in 606 dwellings. 2.2% of people identified as LGBTIQ+. The median age was 48.7 years (compared with 38.1 years nationally). There were 249 people (16.4%) aged under 15 years, 195 (12.9%) aged 15 to 29, 708 (46.7%) aged 30 to 64, and 366 (24.2%) aged 65 or older.

People could identify as more than one ethnicity. The results were 84.4% European (Pākehā); 26.7% Māori; 2.2% Pasifika; 2.8% Asian; 0.8% Middle Eastern, Latin American and African New Zealanders (MELAA); and 3.4% other, which includes people giving their ethnicity as "New Zealander". English was spoken by 98.0%, Māori language by 5.5%, and other languages by 7.9%. No language could be spoken by 1.4% (e.g. too young to talk). New Zealand Sign Language was known by 0.4%. The percentage of people born overseas was 19.2, compared with 28.8% nationally.

Religious affiliations were 23.4% Christian, 0.2% Hindu, 0.2% Islam, 1.8% Māori religious beliefs, 0.6% Buddhist, 0.2% New Age, and 1.4% other religions. People who answered that they had no religion were 64.4%, and 7.9% of people did not answer the census question.

Of those at least 15 years old, 204 (16.1%) people had a bachelor's or higher degree, 711 (56.2%) had a post-high school certificate or diploma, and 279 (22.0%) people exclusively held high school qualifications. The median income was $38,400, compared with $41,500 nationally. 117 people (9.2%) earned over $100,000 compared to 12.1% nationally. The employment status of those at least 15 was that 600 (47.4%) people were employed full-time, 198 (15.6%) were part-time, and 24 (1.9%) were unemployed.

== History ==
Puketona was a Pā and the site of the battle of Taumataiwi or Wai-whariki between Ngāti Maru and Ngāti Rangi of Ngāpuhi in about 1793.

It was part of a purchase of about 2,000 acres (810 ha) of land by Henry Williams on 28 May 1839, from Hōne Heke and 30 other Māori people. He had the property taken care of by shepherds from 1840. One of these was murdered, and the case was reported as the first case of murder dealt with under British justice in New Zealand. In 1851 he transferred the property to his son Edward Marsh Williams, who built a house there in 1860 or 1861, and lived there until 1881. The house, now known as Choat House, is listed as a Category 1 Historic Place.

The road between Paihia and Pakaraka, passing through Puketona, was sealed from 1939, although the quality of the new road appears to have been lacking. Electricity was first supplied to the area in the mid 1940s.
