= Haruru Falls =

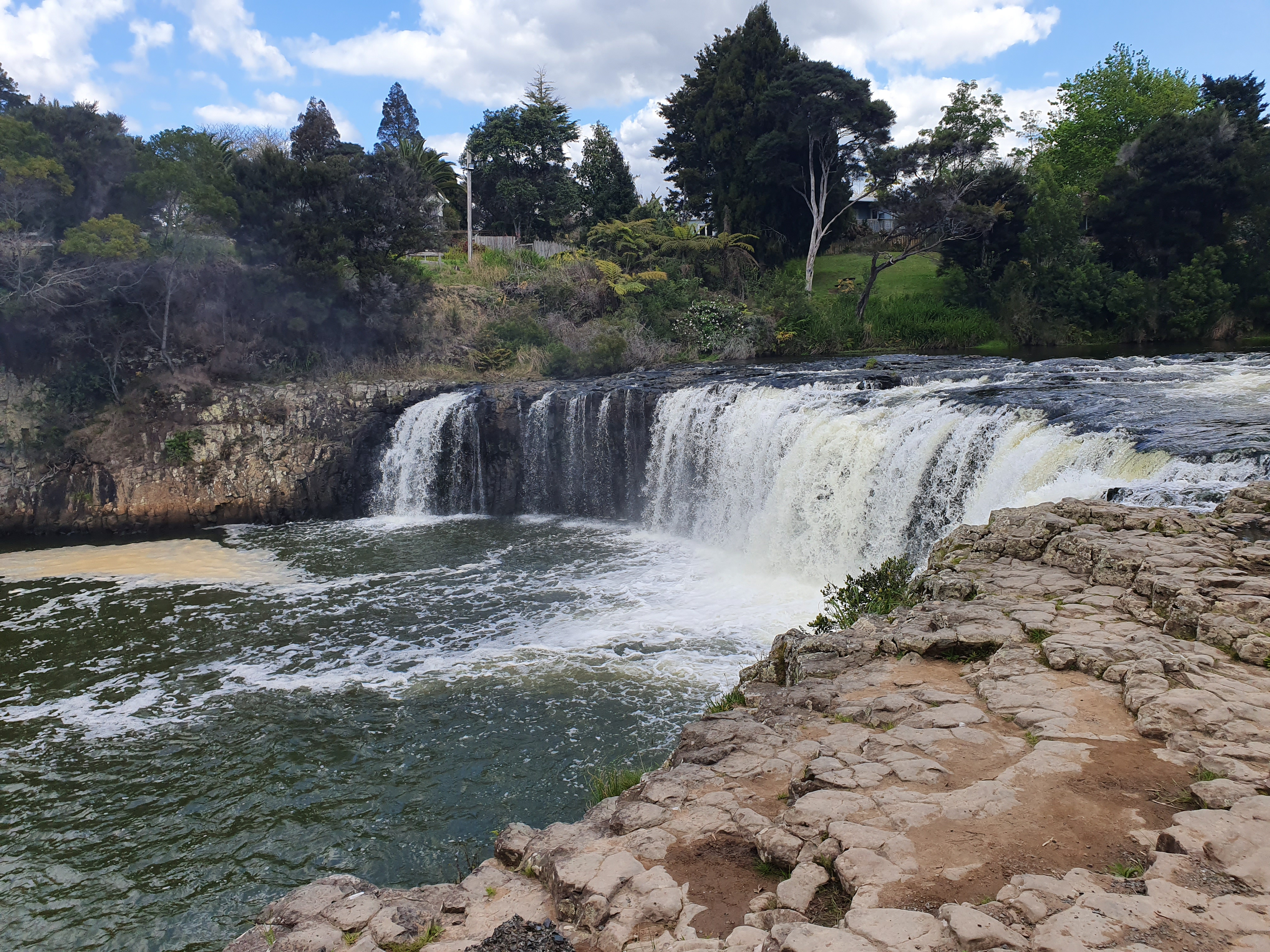
- Interactive map of Haruru Falls
- Location: Haruru, New Zealand
- Coordinates: 35°16′42″S 174°03′05″E
- Type: Block
- Total height: 5 metres (16 ft)
- Total width: 15 metres (49 ft)
- Watercourse: Waitangi River

Haruru Falls is a five-metre-high (16 ft) waterfall near the settlement of Haruru in the Far North District of New Zealand, three kilometres (1.9 mi) west of Paihia.

In the Māori language, the word haruru means 'continuous noise or roar'. The lagoon on the downstream side of the falls was New Zealand's first river port, used by both Māori and early missionaries.

== See also ==
- List of waterfalls
- List of waterfalls in New Zealand
