= Takou River =

Coordinates: 35°06′S 173°57′E

Tākou River
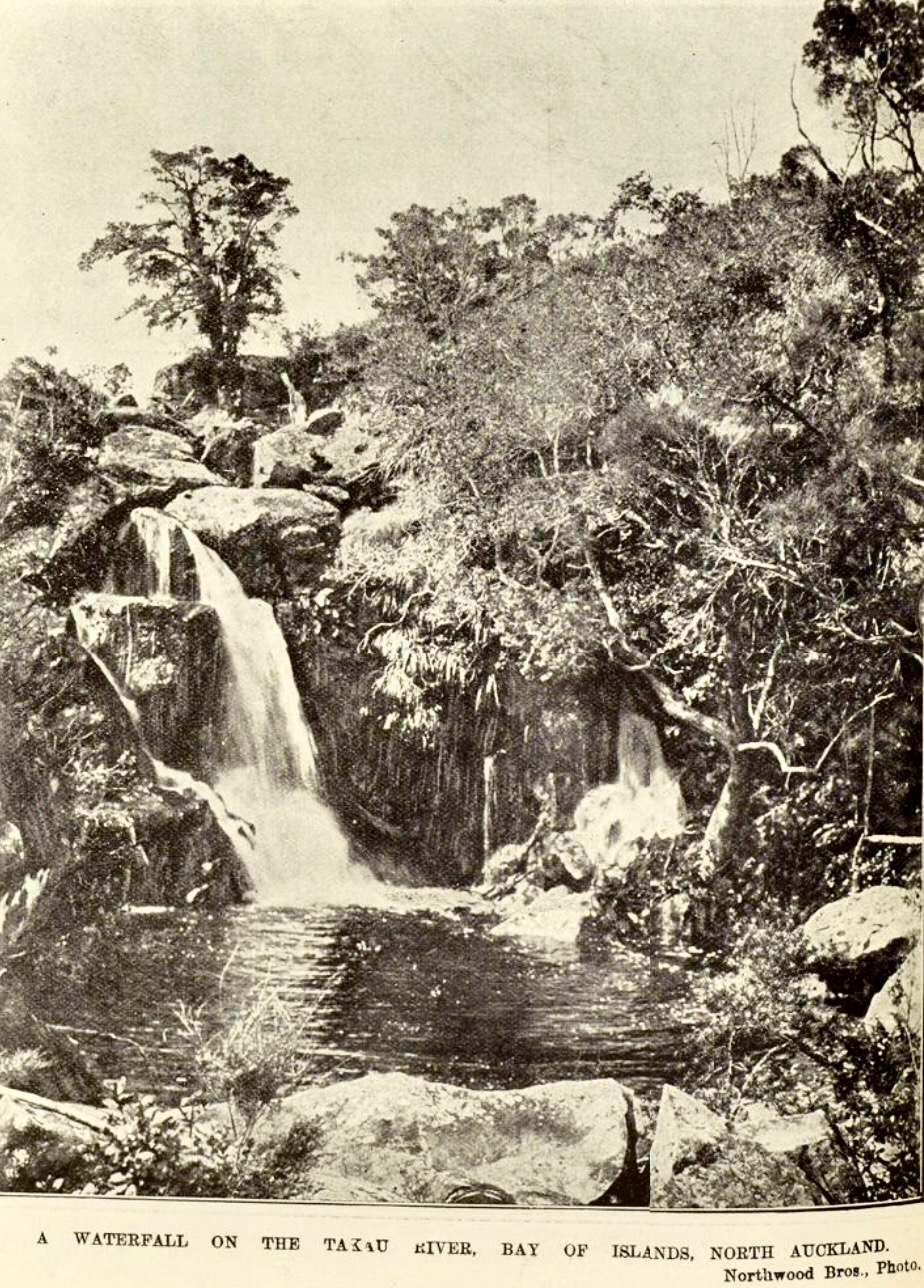
- Tākou River waterfall in 1903

Location
- Country: New Zealand

Physical characteristics
- Source
  - location: Huia
  - elevation: 385 m (1,263 ft)
- Mouth
  - location: Tākou Bay
  - elevation: 0m
- Length: 6 km (3.7 mi)
- Basin size: 73 km (45 mi)

The Tākou River (sometimes Takau, and, in its upper reaches, fed by the Tākou Stream) is a river of the Northland Region of New Zealand's North Island. It flows generally east from its sources east of Kaeo to reach the Pacific Ocean at Tākou Bay, 14 km (8.7 mi) north of Kerikeri.

The river is about 6 km (3.7 mi) long. Its main tributary is the Hikurua River. Tākou River is an official name, gazetted on 29 July 1948. Over two-thirds of the catchment is pasture, with native forest reduced to 14.2% and regenerating manuka, kānuka and other native trees covering about 6.1% of it. Phosphorus and e. coli pollute the river. The original bush was felled in the 1890s, when timber was floated down the river.

== See also ==
- List of rivers of New Zealand
