= Purerua Peninsula =

Peninsula on the northwest side of the Bay of Islands in Northland, New Zealand

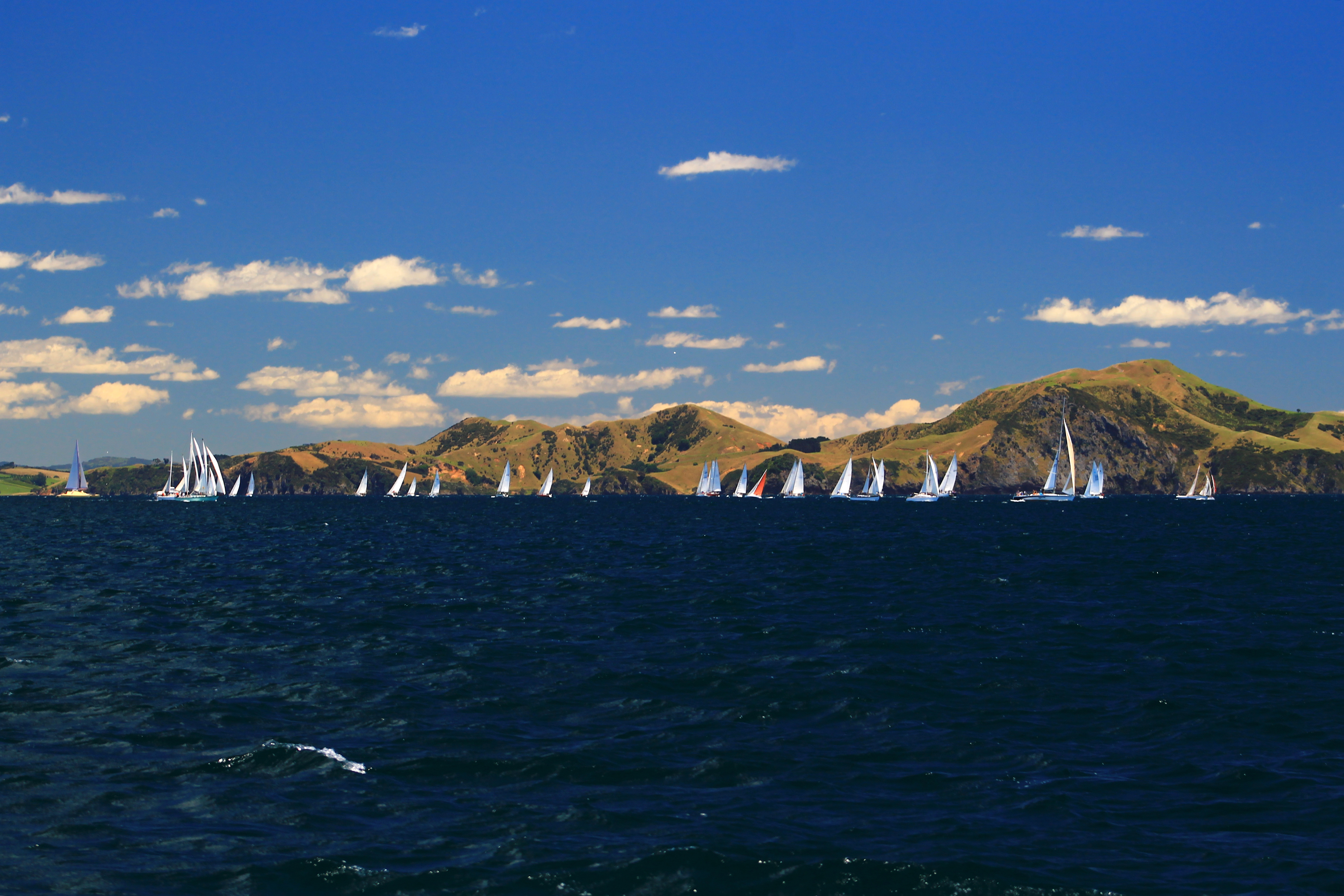
- Purerua Peninsula
- Interactive map of Purerua Peninsula
- Coordinates: 35°8′0″S 174°3′0″E
- Country: New Zealand
- Region: Northland Region
- District: Far North District
- Ward: Bay of Islands/Whangaroa
- Community: Bay of Islands-Whangaroa
- Subdivision: Kerikeri
- Electorates: Northland; Te Tai Tokerau

Government
  - Territorial Authority: Far North District Council
  - Regional council: Northland Regional Council
  - Mayor of Far North: Moko Tepania
  - Northland MP: Grant McCallum
  - Te Tai Tokerau MP: Mariameno Kapa-Kingi

Area
  - Total: 48.21 km^{2} (18.61 sq mi)

Population (2023 Census)
  - Total: 222
  - Density: 4.60/km^{2} (11.9/sq mi)

Purerua Peninsula is a peninsula on the northwest side of the Bay of Islands in Northland, New Zealand. Te Puna Inlet lies to the south of the peninsula. Communities on the peninsula are Purerua, Te Tii and Taronui Bay. Rangihoua Bay is at the southern end of the peninsula.

Te Tii has two marae, belonging to the Ngāpuhi hapū of Ngāti Rēhia: Hiruhārama Hou Marae and meeting house, and Whitiora Marae and Te Ranga Tira Tanga meeting house.

Another local marae, Wharengaere, is a meeting place of the Ngāpuhi hapū of Ngāti Mau and Ngāti Torehina.

== Demographics ==
Purerua Peninsula covers 48.21 km^{2} (18.61 sq mi). It is part of the larger Rangitane-Purerua statistical area.

Historical population for Purerua Peninsula
Year	Pop.	±% p.a.
2006	150	—
2013	171	+1.89%
2018	201	+3.29%
2023	222	+2.01%

Purerua Peninsula had a population of 222 in the 2023 New Zealand census, an increase of 21 people (10.4%) since the 2018 census, and an increase of 51 people (29.8%) since the 2013 census. There were 117 males and 105 females in 81 dwellings. 2.7% of people identified as LGBTIQ+. The median age was 46.5 years (compared with 38.1 years nationally). There were 42 people (18.9%) aged under 15 years, 39 (17.6%) aged 15 to 29, 102 (45.9%) aged 30 to 64, and 39 (17.6%) aged 65 or older.

People could identify as more than one ethnicity. The results were 66.2% European (Pākehā), 55.4% Māori, 6.8% Pasifika, and 1.4% Asian. English was spoken by 97.3%, Māori language by 25.7%, and other languages by 6.8%. No language could be spoken by 1.4% (e.g. too young to talk). The percentage of people born overseas was 17.6, compared with 28.8% nationally.

Religious affiliations were 29.7% Christian, 8.1% Māori religious beliefs, 1.4% New Age, and 1.4% other religions. People who answered that they had no religion were 54.1%, and 6.8% of people did not answer the census question.

Of those at least 15 years old, 27 (15.0%) people had a bachelor's or higher degree, 96 (53.3%) had a post-high school certificate or diploma, and 48 (26.7%) people exclusively held high school qualifications. The median income was $36,600, compared with $41,500 nationally. 15 people (8.3%) earned over $100,000 compared to 12.1% nationally. The employment status of those at least 15 was that 90 (50.0%) people were employed full-time, 30 (16.7%) were part-time, and 12 (6.7%) were unemployed.

=== Rangitane-Purerua statistical area ===
The statistical area of Rangitane-Purerua, which includes Rangitane and Tākou Bay, covers 123.16 km^{2} (47.55 sq mi) and had an estimated population of 1,580 as of June 2025, with a population density of 12.8 people per km^{2}.

Historical population for Rangitane-Purerua
Year	Pop.	±% p.a.
2006	1,182	—
2013	1,170	−0.15%
2018	1,506	+5.18%
2023	1,581	+0.98%

Rangitane-Purerua had a population of 1,581 in the 2023 New Zealand census, an increase of 75 people (5.0%) since the 2018 census, and an increase of 411 people (35.1%) since the 2013 census. There were 783 males, 798 females and 3 people of other genders in 597 dwellings. 1.3% of people identified as LGBTIQ+. The median age was 50.5 years (compared with 38.1 years nationally). There were 288 people (18.2%) aged under 15 years, 183 (11.6%) aged 15 to 29, 753 (47.6%) aged 30 to 64, and 357 (22.6%) aged 65 or older.

People could identify as more than one ethnicity. The results were 75.1% European (Pākehā); 35.9% Māori; 3.6% Pasifika; 1.9% Asian; 0.8% Middle Eastern, Latin American and African New Zealanders (MELAA); and 1.5% other, which includes people giving their ethnicity as "New Zealander". English was spoken by 98.3%, Māori language by 13.9%, Samoan by 0.4% and other languages by 7.6%. No language could be spoken by 0.9% (e.g. too young to talk). New Zealand Sign Language was known by 0.4%. The percentage of people born overseas was 22.2, compared with 28.8% nationally.

Religious affiliations were 27.7% Christian, 5.1% Māori religious beliefs, 0.4% Buddhist, 0.6% New Age, 0.2% Jewish, and 1.7% other religions. People who answered that they had no religion were 57.7%, and 6.6% of people did not answer the census question.

Of those at least 15 years old, 219 (16.9%) people had a bachelor's or higher degree, 705 (54.5%) had a post-high school certificate or diploma, and 297 (23.0%) people exclusively held high school qualifications. The median income was $35,900, compared with $41,500 nationally. 135 people (10.4%) earned over $100,000 compared to 12.1% nationally. The employment status of those at least 15 was that 546 (42.2%) people were employed full-time, 189 (14.6%) were part-time, and 39 (3.0%) were unemployed.

== Wildlife sanctuary ==
The area of the Purerua-Mataroa Peninsula, (Note: The dual name of the peninsula has been adopted by predator control organistions working on the peninsula as part of partnership with the local hapū Ngāti Torehina ki Matakā) is over 7,000 ha (17,000 acres). A community project began in the 2000s to turn the entire peninsula into a wildlife sanctuary, with strict limits on residential development. A ten-year programme costing $2.5 million was launched in 2009, with the support of the owners of adjoining farms, with the intention of gaining approval for the translocation to the peninsula of endangered native birds.

By 2025, based on recordings of kiwi calls, the peninsula was believed to have the highest density in New Zealand of the North Island brown kiwi. However, nine dead kiwi were found in the area, and there had been reports of roaming dogs on the peninsula. As of June 2026, there was an estimated population of 3,000 brown kiwi on the Purerua-Mataroa peninsula.

In August 2026, the Pest-free Purerua-Mataroa organisation reported that after three years of effort, they had shot a feral cat that was believed to have killed the majority of the rare pāteke, or brown teal, that had been released on the Purerua Peninsula.

== Education ==
Bay of Islands International Academy is a state-funded Year 1–8 New Zealand primary school which opened in January 2013 in the existing buildings and grounds of the former Te Tii School on the Purerua Peninsula, about 17 km north of Kerikeri township. A Purerua Public School had been in existence since 1906, with a ferry service from Te Tii. The academy's Māori name is Te Whare Mātauranga o Te Tii.

The academy is an authorised IB World School offering the International Baccalaureate Primary Years Programme. The programme emphasises academic achievement, inquiry-style learning and an international, multicultural curriculum. All students are required to learn a second language. The school serves the Kerikeri/Waipapa/Purerua area of New Zealand's Far North District and has capacity for about 100 students. Its roll was 56 as of March 2026. An enrolment zone is in effect.

Bay of Islands International Academy is sited on two hectares (five acres) of grounds. Facilities include four classrooms, a library, a resource room, administrative space, a swimming pool, and play areas. The school is connected to the internet via 100 Mbit/s fibre optic ultra-fast broadband, and all learning spaces have WiFi coverage. Following the 2013 national census the school shifted from decile 3 to decile 6, indicating a substantial shift in the population of attending students.

== Climate ==
Climate data for Purerua (1991–2020 normals, extremes 1999–present)
Month	Jan	Feb	Mar	Apr	May	Jun	Jul	Aug	Sep	Oct	Nov	Dec	Year
Record high °C (°F)	31.0 (87.8)	28.6 (83.5)	26.8 (80.2)	25.4 (77.7)	23.4 (74.1)	21.2 (70.2)	19.3 (66.7)	20.5 (68.9)	24.1 (75.4)	24.2 (75.6)	26.8 (80.2)	28.2 (82.8)	31.0 (87.8)
Mean maximum °C (°F)	26.7 (80.1)	26.6 (79.9)	25.0 (77.0)	23.2 (73.8)	20.8 (69.4)	18.9 (66.0)	17.9 (64.2)	18.3 (64.9)	20.0 (68.0)	21.5 (70.7)	23.6 (74.5)	25.2 (77.4)	27.4 (81.3)
Mean daily maximum °C (°F)	22.9 (73.2)	23.4 (74.1)	22.2 (72.0)	20.4 (68.7)	18.2 (64.8)	16.2 (61.2)	15.4 (59.7)	15.6 (60.1)	16.8 (62.2)	18.1 (64.6)	19.5 (67.1)	21.4 (70.5)	19.2 (66.5)
Daily mean °C (°F)	19.1 (66.4)	19.8 (67.6)	18.7 (65.7)	16.9 (62.4)	15.0 (59.0)	12.9 (55.2)	12.2 (54.0)	12.3 (54.1)	13.3 (55.9)	14.5 (58.1)	15.8 (60.4)	17.8 (64.0)	15.7 (60.2)
Mean daily minimum °C (°F)	15.4 (59.7)	16.2 (61.2)	15.1 (59.2)	13.5 (56.3)	11.7 (53.1)	9.7 (49.5)	9.0 (48.2)	9.0 (48.2)	9.8 (49.6)	10.8 (51.4)	12.0 (53.6)	14.1 (57.4)	12.2 (54.0)
Mean minimum °C (°F)	11.7 (53.1)	12.6 (54.7)	11.4 (52.5)	9.2 (48.6)	7.0 (44.6)	5.4 (41.7)	4.3 (39.7)	5.2 (41.4)	5.8 (42.4)	6.8 (44.2)	8.0 (46.4)	10.4 (50.7)	4.0 (39.2)
Record low °C (°F)	10.1 (50.2)	10.9 (51.6)	7.8 (46.0)	5.5 (41.9)	4.1 (39.4)	3.0 (37.4)	1.9 (35.4)	2.5 (36.5)	3.5 (38.3)	4.8 (40.6)	6.1 (43.0)	8.2 (46.8)	1.9 (35.4)
Average rainfall mm (inches)	57.5 (2.26)	77.0 (3.03)	94.8 (3.73)	121.7 (4.79)	127.6 (5.02)	138.3 (5.44)	119.8 (4.72)	130.0 (5.12)	104.0 (4.09)	64.5 (2.54)	67.4 (2.65)	91.6 (3.61)	1,194.2 (47)
Source: NIWA

== Notable people ==
- Glenn Colquhoun, poet
