= Hikurua River =

Coordinates: 35°06′S 173°55′E

Location
- Country: New Zealand

Physical characteristics
- Length: 12 km (7.5 mi)

The Hikurua River is a river of the far north of New Zealand's North Island. It flows southeast from rough hill country south of the Whangaroa Harbour, reaching the sea at Takou Bay, 8 kilometres (5 mi) south of the Cavalli Islands.

== See also ==
- List of rivers of New Zealand
