= Tahoranui River =

Coordinates: 35°07′S 173°58′E

Location
- Country: New Zealand

Physical characteristics
- Mouth
  - location: Takou Bay
- Length: 12 km (7.5 mi)

The Tahoranui River is a river of the Northland Region of New Zealand's North Island. It flows northeast from its origins near he settlement of Te Whau to reach the Pacific Ocean at Tākou Bay, 10 kilometres north of Kerikeri.

== See also ==
- List of rivers of New Zealand
