= Waitangi River =

Waitangi River is the name of two rivers in the far north of New Zealand's North Island.

- Waitangi River (Far North District)
- Waitangi River (Whangarei District)
