= Rangitane River =

Coordinates: 35°10′S 173°56′E

Location
- Country: New Zealand

Physical characteristics
- Mouth
  - location: Tahoranui River

The Rangitane River is a short river of the Northland Region of New Zealand's North Island. It flows east to reach the Tahoranui River 10 kilometres (6 mi) north of Kerikeri.

== See also ==
- List of rivers of New Zealand
