= Kerikeri Inlet =

- Interactive map of Kerikeri Inlet
- Coordinates: 35.215°S 174.027°E
- Country: New Zealand
- Region: Northland Region
- District: Far North District
- Ward: Bay of Islands-Whangaroa
- Community: Bay of Islands-Whangaroa
- Subdivision: Kerikeri
- Electorates: Northland; Te Tai Tokerau

Government
  - Territorial Authority: Far North District Council
  - Regional council: Northland Regional Council
  - Mayor of Far North: Moko Tepania
  - Northland MP: Grant McCallum
  - Te Tai Tokerau MP: Mariameno Kapa-Kingi

Area
  - Total: 14.12 km^{2} (5.45 sq mi)

Population (June 2025)
  - Total: 460
  - Density: 33/km^{2} (84/sq mi)

Kerikeri Inlet is a settlement on the south side of the inlet of the same name in the Far North District of New Zealand. It is 10 km west of Kerikeri by road.

A private developer built a boat ramp and jetty at Windsor Point around 2000, but subsequently abandoned them. The ramp was bought by the Far North District Council, but the only land access was across private property. In 2019 work started to create a sealed access road and car park. Opposition to the development led to a four-day occupation of the land followed by a rāhui placed by Te Uri Taniwha against further construction or dredging. The dispute was resolved in late 2020 and the new facilities were complete in May 2021.

== Demographics ==
Statistics New Zealand describes Kerikeri Inlet as a rural settlement. It covers 14.12 km^{2} (5.45 sq mi) and had an estimated population of 460 as of June 2025, with a population density of 33 people per km^{2}. The settlement is part of the larger Puketona-Waitangi statistical area.

Historical population
| Year | Pop. | ±% p.a. |
|---|---|---|
| 2006 | 363 | — |
| 2013 | 390 | +1.03% |
| 2018 | 447 | +2.77% |
| 2023 | 435 | −0.54% |

Kerikeri Inlet had a population of 435 in the 2023 New Zealand census, a decrease of 12 people (−2.7%) since the 2018 census, and an increase of 45 people (11.5%) since the 2013 census. There were 231 males and 207 females in 192 dwellings. 1.4% of people identified as LGBTIQ+. The median age was 57.5 years (compared with 38.1 years nationally). There were 48 people (11.0%) aged under 15 years, 45 (10.3%) aged 15 to 29, 204 (46.9%) aged 30 to 64, and 138 (31.7%) aged 65 or older.

People could identify as more than one ethnicity. The results were 89.7% European (Pākehā); 19.3% Māori; 2.1% Pasifika; 1.4% Asian; 1.4% Middle Eastern, Latin American and African New Zealanders (MELAA); and 2.8% other, which includes people giving their ethnicity as "New Zealander". English was spoken by 98.6%, Māori language by 3.4%, and other languages by 9.0%. No language could be spoken by 0.7% (e.g. too young to talk). New Zealand Sign Language was known by 0.7%. The percentage of people born overseas was 23.4, compared with 28.8% nationally.

Religious affiliations were 22.8% Christian, 0.7% Māori religious beliefs, and 0.7% other religions. People who answered that they had no religion were 66.9%, and 8.3% of people did not answer the census question.

Of those at least 15 years old, 75 (19.4%) people had a bachelor's or higher degree, 213 (55.0%) had a post-high school certificate or diploma, and 72 (18.6%) people exclusively held high school qualifications. The median income was $38,400, compared with $41,500 nationally. 48 people (12.4%) earned over $100,000 compared to 12.1% nationally. The employment status of those at least 15 was that 162 (41.9%) people were employed full-time, 66 (17.1%) were part-time, and 9 (2.3%) were unemployed.
