= State Highway 11 (New Zealand) =

Road in New Zealand

State Highway 11

Route information
- Maintained by NZ Transport Agency Waka Kotahi
- Length: 30 km (19 mi)
- Known for: Waitangi Treaty Grounds

Major junctions
- Southeast end: SH 1 (Queen Street), Kawakawa
- Northwest end: SH 10 at Puketona Junction

Location
- Country: New Zealand
- Primary destinations: Paihia

Highway system
- New Zealand state highways; Motorways and expressways; List
← SH 10	→ SH 12

State Highway 11 (SH 11) is a 30 kilometre stretch of highway in the North Island of New Zealand. It links SH 10 at Puketona and SH 1 at Kawakawa. Its main destination is the Bay of Islands township of Paihia. Until 2004, it terminated at Tohitapu Road, in southern Paihia township.

== Route ==
First gazetted in 1997, SH 11 begins at a junction with SH 1 in Kawakawa. It heads north along the coast, passing west of Opua before entering Paihia along Paihia Road, Seaview Road and Marsden Road. It then leaves Paihia to the west along Puketona Road and passes through Haruru, before terminating at Puketona Junction on SH 10, 10 km (6.2 mi) south of Kerikeri.

SH 11 provides access, via Paihia, to the Waitangi Treaty Grounds: the location where the Treaty of Waitangi was signed in 1840.

== Major intersections ==
Territorial authority	Location	km	mi	Destinations	Notes
Far North District	Kawakawa	0	0.0	SH 1 south – Whangārei; SH 1 north – Kaikohe, Kerikeri, Cape Reinga	SH 11 begins 35°22′51″S 174°04′18″E
Far North District	Paihia	16.9	10.5	Te Karuwha Parade – Waitangi	
Far North District	Puketona Junction	29.5	18.3	SH 1 south – Kawakawa; SH 1 north – Kerikeri, Kaitaia	SH 11 ends 35°18′12″S 173°57′45″E
