= Waitangi River (Far North District) =

Coordinates: 35.2716°S 174.0797°E

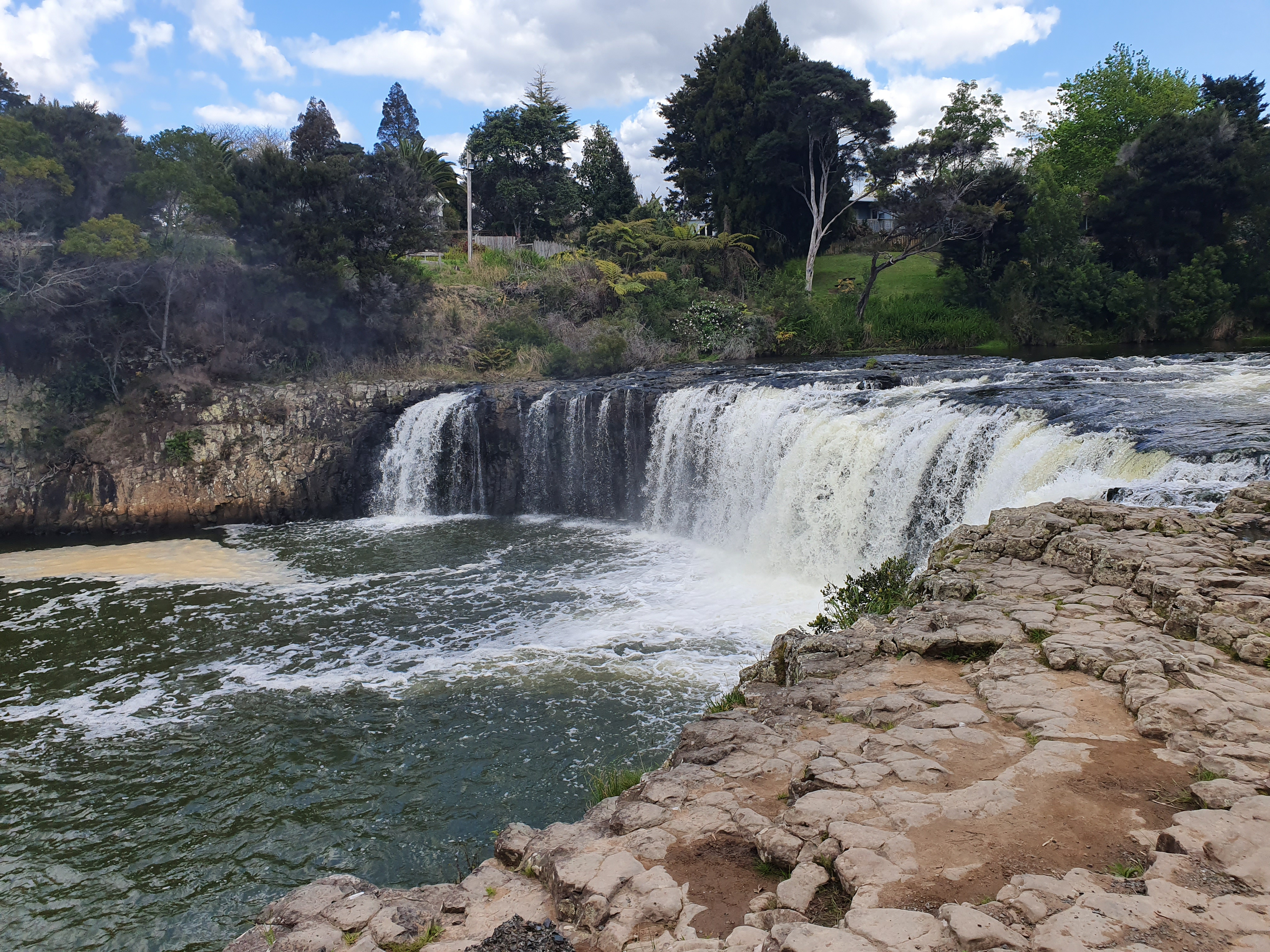
- Waitangi River flowing over Haruru Falls

Location
- Country: New Zealand

Physical characteristics
- Mouth
  - location: Bay of Islands
- Length: 28 km (17 mi)

The Waitangi River is a river of the Northland Region of New Zealand's North Island. It originates close to the northern shore of Lake Ōmāpere and flows eastwards to the Bay of Islands. It is considered to end either where it drops over Haruru Falls into a tidal estuary, or where the estuary opens into Te Tī Bay, just below the bridge between the historic locality of Waitangi and the town of Paihia.

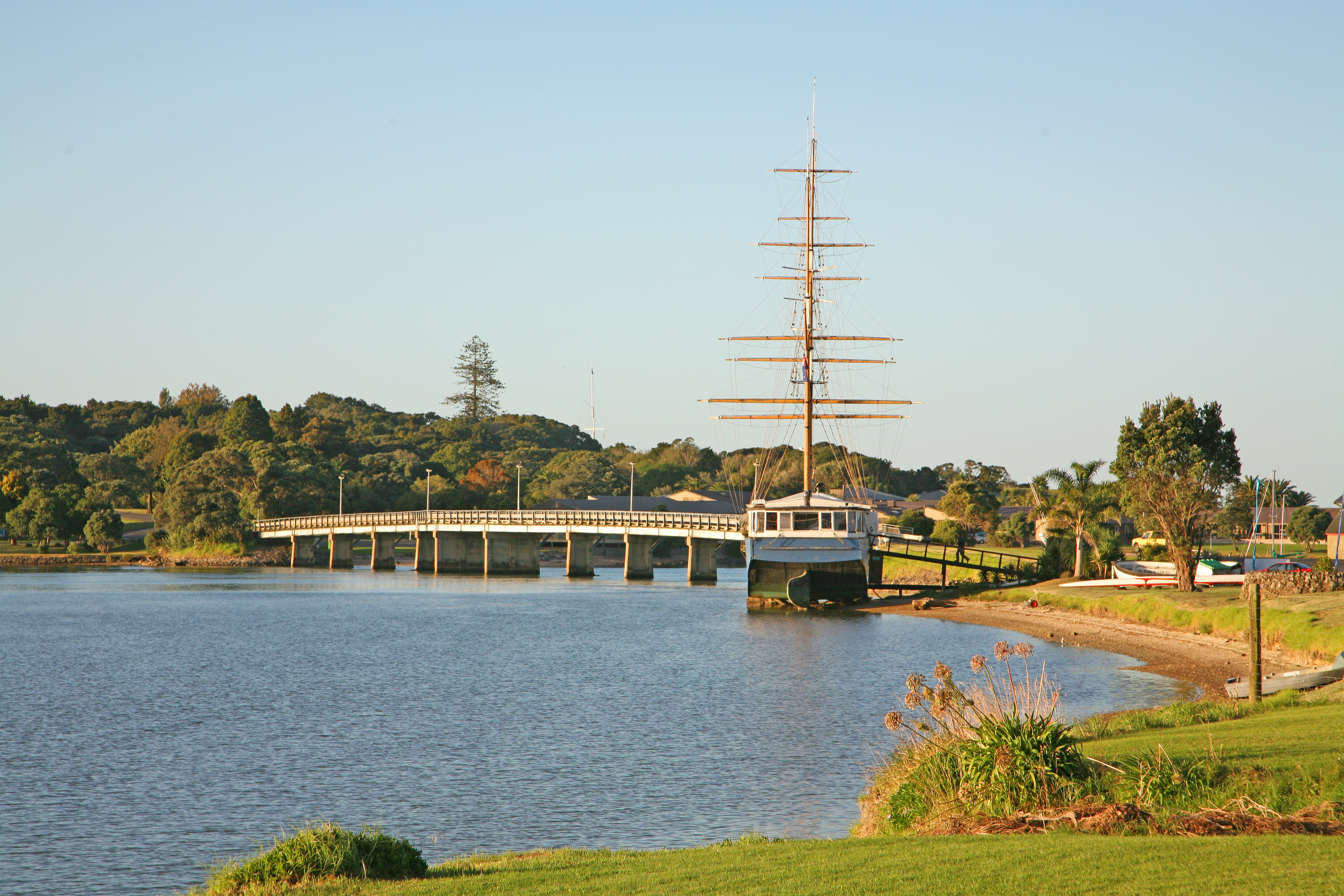
Bridge across the Waitangi River estuary from Paihia to Waitangi

== See also ==
- List of rivers of New Zealand
