= Tākou Bay =

Coordinates: 35.120385°S 173.904178°E

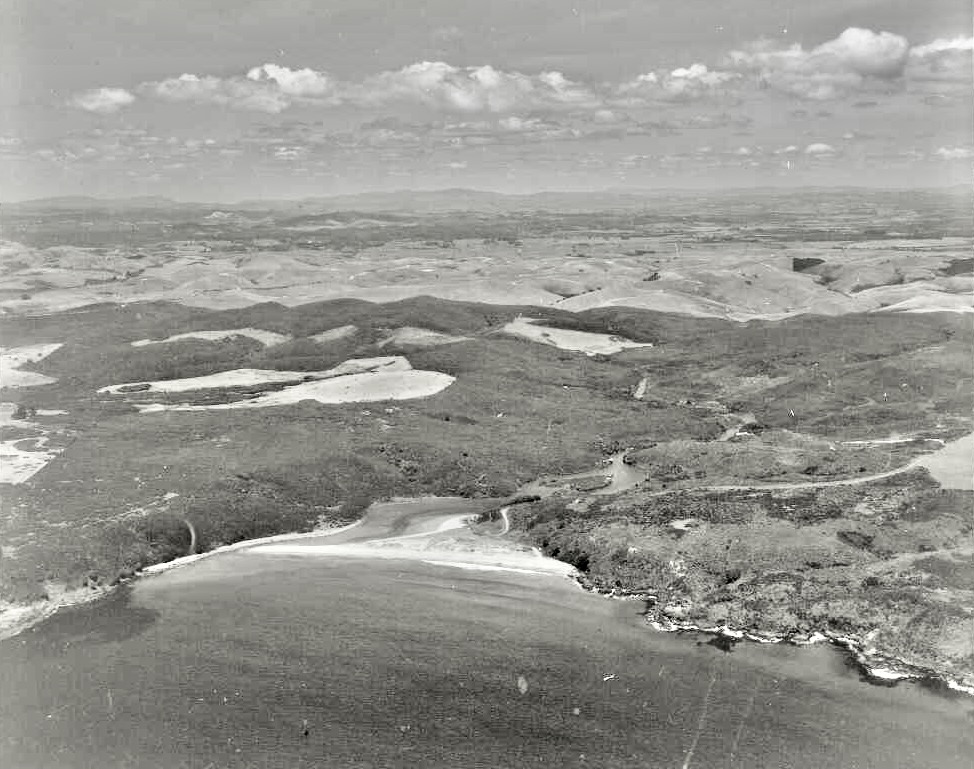
- Tākou Bay in 1973
- Interactive map of Tākou Bay
- Country: New Zealand
- Region: Northland Region
- District: Far North District
- Ward: Bay of Islands-Whangaroa
- Community: Bay of Islands-Whangaroa
- Subdivision: Whangaroa
- Electorates: Northland; Te Tai Tokerau

Government
  - Territorial Authority: Far North District Council
  - Regional council: Northland Regional Council
  - Mayor of Far North: Moko Tepania
  - Northland MP: Grant McCallum
  - Te Tai Tokerau MP: Mariameno Kapa-Kingi

Area
  - Total: 12.60 km^{2} (4.86 sq mi)

Population (2023 Census)
  - Total: 132
  - Density: 10.5/km^{2} (27.1/sq mi)
- Postcode: 0295

Tākou Bay is a bay and rural community in the Far North District and Northland Region of New Zealand's North Island, beside the Tākou River. Tākou Bay is an official name, gazetted on 16 July 2020.

The local Tākou Marae is a meeting place for the Ngāpuhi hapū of Ngāti Tautahi, Ngāti Tūpango and Ngāti Whakaeke, and the Ngāpuhi and Ngāpuhi / Ngāti Kahu ki Whaingaroa hapū of Ngāti Rēhia. It includes Te Whetū Marama meeting house. The Mātaatua canoe ended its journey in Tākou Bay. Piakoa burial caves in the cliffs above the bay are wāhi tapu on the New Zealand Heritage List. In 2019 Māori Development Minister, Nanaia Mahuta, announced up to $2.3m investment with Te Rūnanga o Whaingaroa in housing at Tākou Bay for repairs and affordable homes.

== Demographics ==
Tākou Bay is in an SA1 statistical area which covers 12.60 km^{2} (4.86 sq mi) and includes the area south of the Takou River and northwest of State Highway 10. The SA1 area is part of the larger Rangitane-Purerua statistical area.

Historical population for Tākou Bay and surrounds
Year	Pop.	±% p.a.
2013	111	—
2018	138	+4.45%
2023	132	−0.89%

The SA1 statistical area had a population of 132 in the 2023 New Zealand census, a decrease of 6 people (−4.3%) since the 2018 census, and an increase of 21 people (18.9%) since the 2013 census. There were 72 males and 60 females in 45 dwellings. The median age was 48.3 years (compared with 38.1 years nationally). There were 12 people (9.1%) aged under 15 years, 24 (18.2%) aged 15 to 29, 66 (50.0%) aged 30 to 64, and 27 (20.5%) aged 65 or older.

People could identify as more than one ethnicity. The results were 84.1% European (Pākehā), 22.7% Māori, and 2.3% Pasifika. English was spoken by 100.0%, Māori language by 4.5%, and other languages by 9.1%. The percentage of people born overseas was 29.5, compared with 28.8% nationally.

Religious affiliations were 34.1% Christian, 2.3% Māori religious beliefs, and 2.3% New Age. People who answered that they had no religion were 54.5%, and 4.5% of people did not answer the census question.

Of those at least 15 years old, 15 (12.5%) people had a bachelor's or higher degree, 60 (50.0%) had a post-high school certificate or diploma, and 33 (27.5%) people exclusively held high school qualifications. The median income was $30,200, compared with $41,500 nationally. 6 people (5.0%) earned over $100,000 compared to 12.1% nationally. The employment status of those at least 15 was that 54 (45.0%) people were employed full-time and 18 (15.0%) were part-time.
