= State Highway 10 (New Zealand) =

Road in New Zealand

State Highway 10

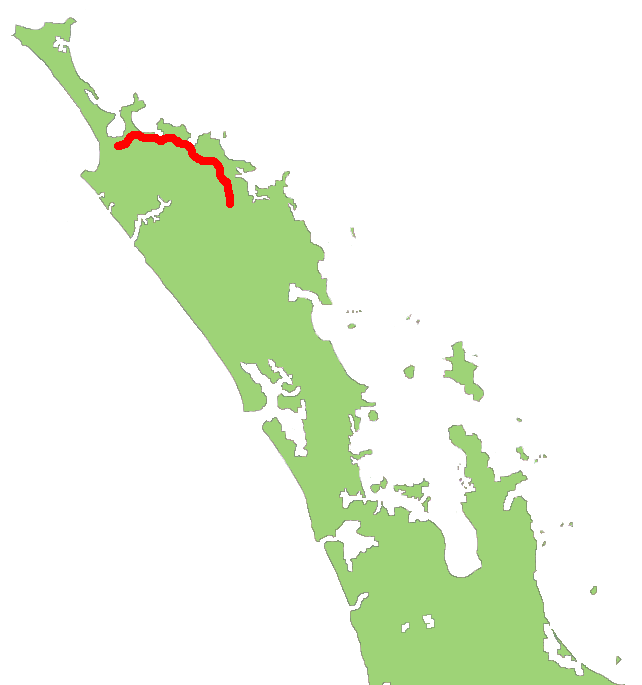

Route information
- Maintained by NZ Transport Agency Waka Kotahi
- Length: 103.8 km (64.5 mi)

Major junctions
- Southeast end: SH 1 at Pakaraka
- SH 11 (Puketona Road) at Puketona
- Northwest end: SH 1 (Far North Road) at Awanui

Location
- Country: New Zealand

Highway system
- New Zealand state highways; Motorways and expressways; List
← SH 8	→ SH 11

State Highway 10 (SH 10) is a road in the Far North District of the North Island of New Zealand. Both ends of the road adjoin SH 1. With the exception of SH 1, it is the country's northernmost state highway.

== Route ==
SH 10 begins at a junction with SH 1 near Pakaraka, 8 km (5.0 mi) east of Ōhaeawai, and initially runs north to pass Kerikeri and Paihia to the west (the latter accessed via SH 11). Passing the Bay of Islands, the road turns to the north-west and reaches the coast at Whangaroa Harbour, then heads inland again before meeting the coast once more at the Taipa–Mangōnui settlements. From there it runs west-south-west to its terminus at a junction with SH 1 at Awanui, 7 km (4.3 mi) north of Kaitaia.

As with several roads in the Far North District, the highway is prone to flooding at some times of the year. Heavy rains in August 2012 caused major subsidence to undermine parts of the highway near Kaeo, which required substantial repair. The road is narrow in places, due to the nature of the landscape around the highway, though substantial improvements have been made since 2010 to one of the most dangerous stretches at Bulls Gorge, south of Kerikeri.

== Major intersections ==
Territorial authority	Location	km	mi	Destinations	Notes
Far North District	Pakaraka	0	0.0	SH 1 south – Kawakawa, Whangārei; SH 1 north – Kaitaia, Cape Reinga	SH 10 begins 35°21′26″S 173°57′24″E
Far North District	Puketona Junction	7.5	4.7	SH 11 (Puketona Road) – Paihia	
Far North District	Kerikeri	14.2	8.8	(Wiroa Road) – Kerikeri Airport (Kerikeri Road) – Kerikeri town centre	
Far North District	Kaeo	44.8	27.8	(Whangaroa Road) – Whangaroa	
Far North District	Awanui	104	65	SH 1 south – Kaitaia; SH 1 north – Cape Reinga	SH 10 ends 35°02′47″S 173°15′23″E
