= Waitangi Treaty Monument =

Monument in Paihia, New Zealand

Coordinates: 35°16′27″S 174°04′46″E

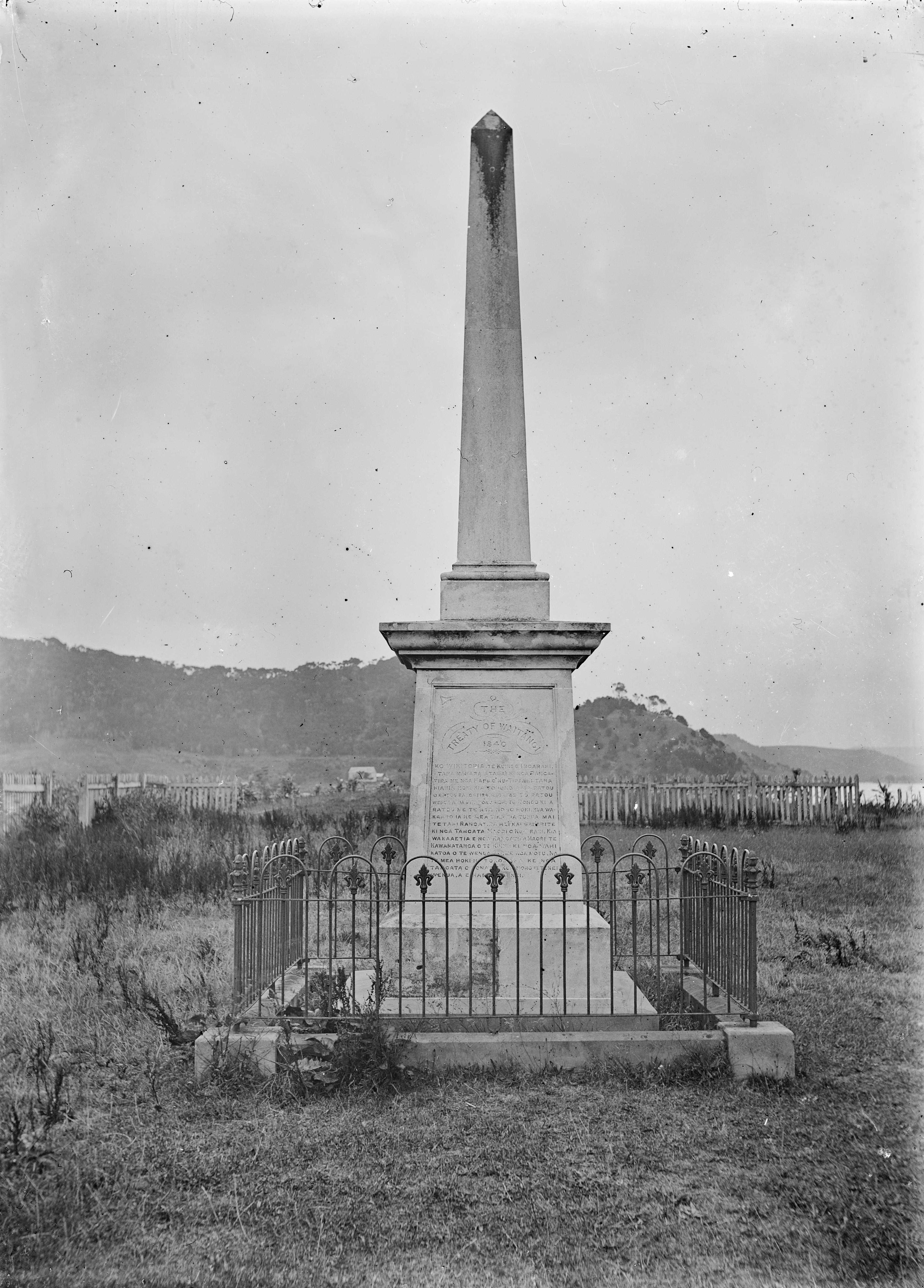
The Waitangi Treaty Monument in 1912

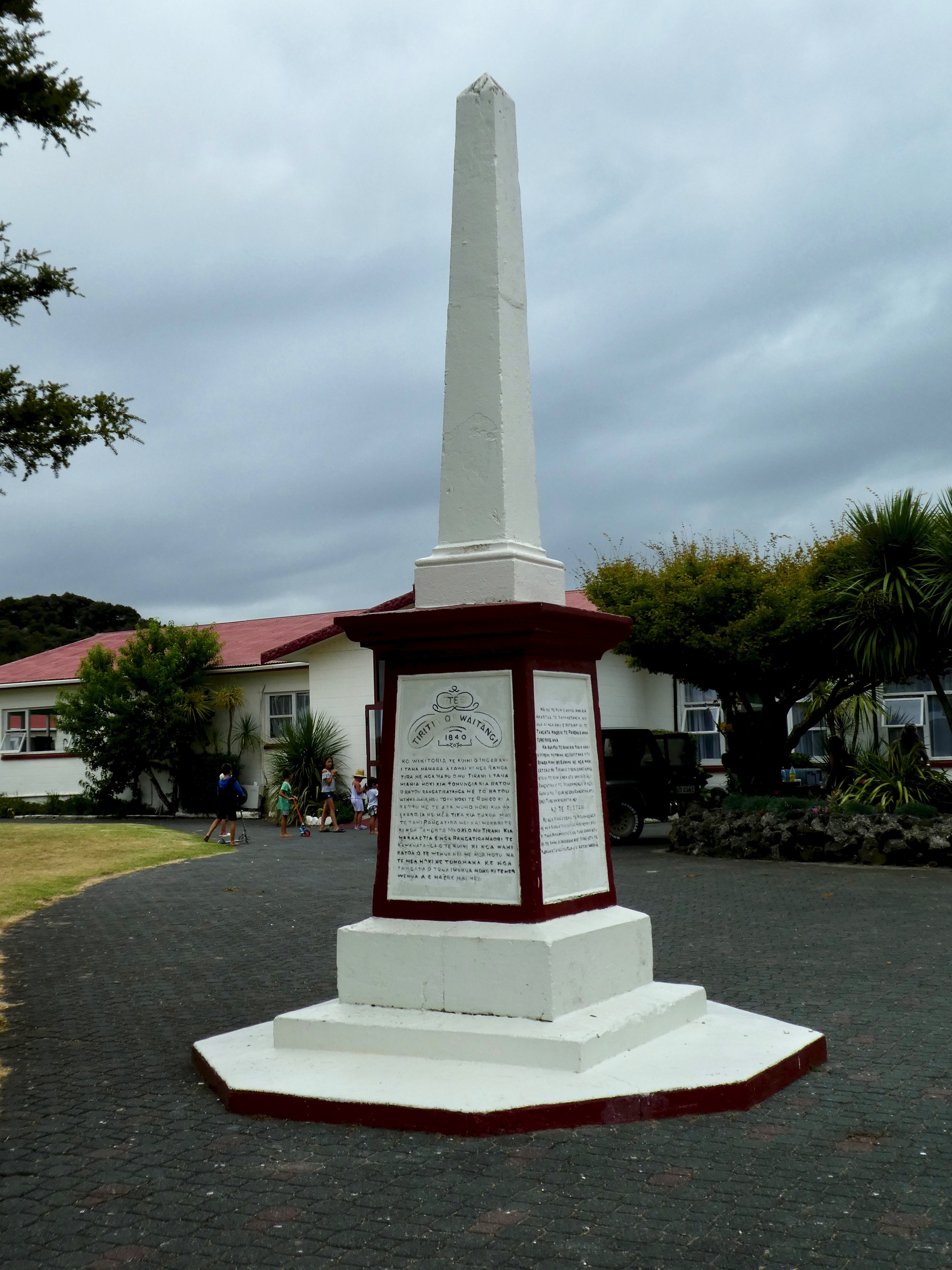
The Waitangi Treaty Monument in 2019

The Waitangi Treaty Monument, also known as the Te Tii memorial, is registered with Heritage New Zealand (formerly known as the New Zealand Historic Places Trust) as a Category I structure.

The monument was built in circa 1880–1881. Its inscription shows the full text in its Māori version of the Treaty of Waitangi.

The monument was registered as a Category I heritage item by the Historic Places Trust on 19 March 1987 with registration number 71. It is located on Te Karuwha Parade in Paihia.

== History ==
In mid-1880, members of Ngāpuhi commissioned the Auckland-based stonemason company of Buchanan to construct a memorial commemorating the signing of the Treaty of Waitangi. The memorial foundation base was constructed out of Sydney sandstone (described as 'Sydney freestone' in contemporary reports of the time period), the material used for the memorial itself was Oamaru stone. It was constructed with a large base with a shaft, capital and frieze with a diminishing column with the entire structure reaching a total height of 17 feet (5.2 m). Plaques bearing an inscription of the full text of the Treaty of Waitangi in Māori were placed on all four sides of the base as well as a further inscription that 512 chiefs had been signatories.

The memorial was unveiled on 26 March 1881. More than 3,000 Maori nationwide arrived for the unveiling of the memorial and a substantial meeting house or runanga whare. There was also a hui (gathering) to discuss three clauses in the Treaty of Waitangi with a view to setting aside past intertribal conflicts. At the time of the unveiling, the Governor-General Sir Arthur Hamilton Gordon had been asked to attend. However, the Minister of Native Affairs, William Rolleston had come in his place. Ngāpuhi leaders, expressed their disappointment but were satisfied Rolleston had come as the Governor-General's representative.
