= Haruru =

- Location within Kenya
- Coordinates: 1.32°S 40.18°E
- Country: Kenya
- County: Garissa County
- Time zone: UTC+3 (EAT)

Haruru is a settlement in Garissa County, Kenya. It lies within Arawale National Reserve.
