= Wangapeka Track =

New Zealand tramping track

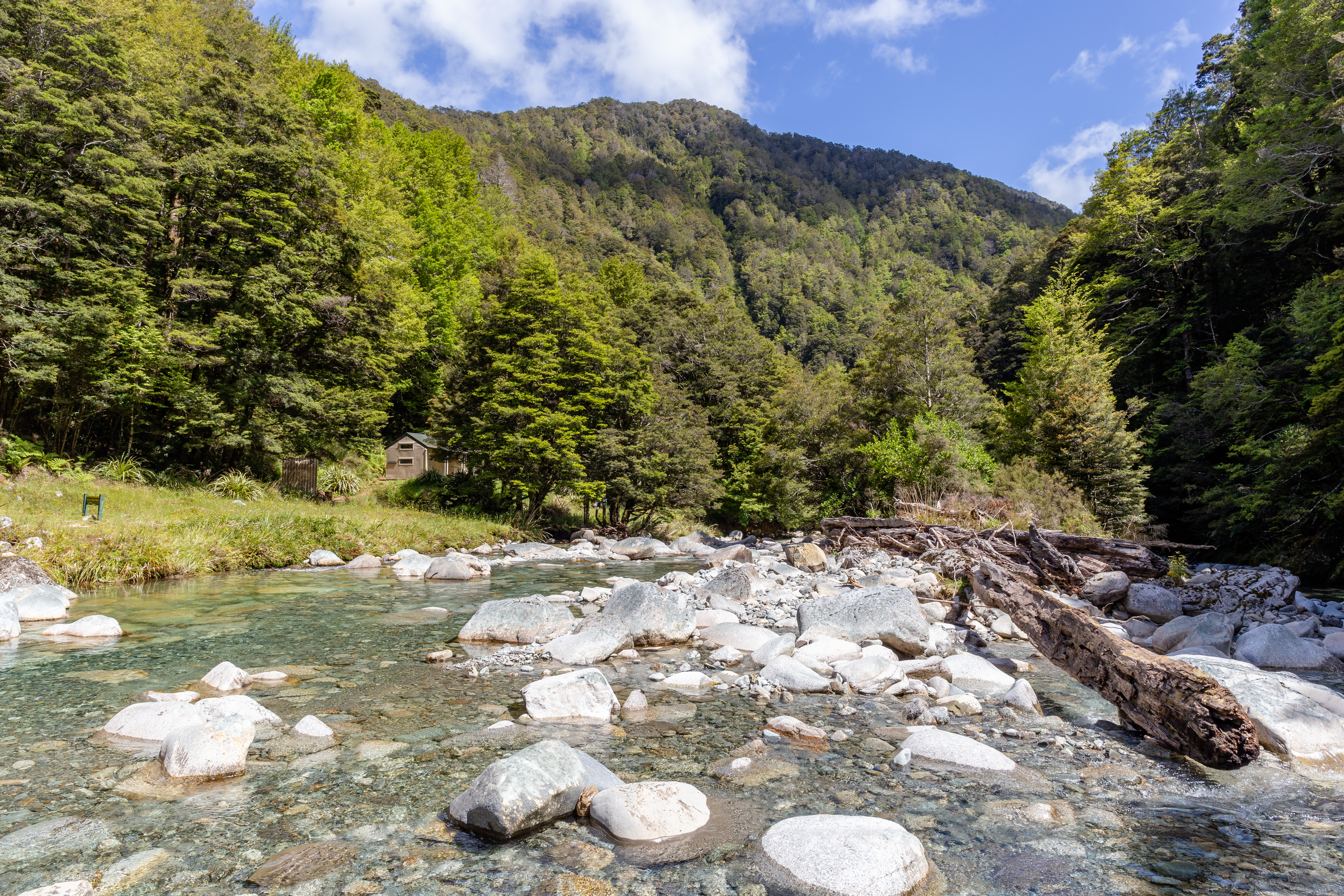
- Karamea River by Helicopter Flat Hut
- Length: 59 km (37 mi)
- Location: Kahurangi National Park
- Trailheads: Rolling River car park 41.444431°S 172.580967°E; Wangapeka Road car park 41.353039°S 172.1416°E
- Use: Tramping
- Elevation gain/loss: 3,206 metres (10,520 ft) gain
- Highest point: 1,087 m (3,566 ft)
- Lowest point: 60 m (200 ft)
- Difficulty: Medium
- Maintainer: Department of Conservation

Trail map
- Map of Wangapeka Track

The Wangapeka Track is a tramping track in the north-west of the South Island of New Zealand. It is one of the main tramping tracks in the Kahurangi National Park, a protected area managed by the Department of Conservation. The route traverses the southern end of the park from the historic Wangapeka goldfields area west of Tapawera to the coastal plains of the West Coast at Little Wanganui. The route is 59 km (37 mi) long and crosses the Wangapeka and Little Wanganui saddles, each over 1,000 m (3,300 ft) in elevation. The track passes through the valleys of the Wangapeka River, Karamea River, Taipō River and Little Wanganui River. The majority of the track is in river valleys and under forest cover, with small sections in tussock land at Stag Flat and the Little Wanganui Saddle. It typically takes walkers 4–6 days to complete the route.

Track building began in 1861 from the eastern end, following the discovery of gold in the Wangapeka River valley in 1859 and further gold discoveries in the Rolling River in 1861. Early work on the track was funded by the Nelson Provincial Council and employed gold diggers as labourers. In 1868, a proposal was made for a through-route from Wangapeka to Karamea, suitable for horse-drawn vehicles. However, construction proceeded slowly in stages over many years. The track from the east reached the Karamea gorge in 1897. Track-building from the western end began in 1894, and by 1899 there was 4.5 miles (7.2 km) of cart road, a pack track and a roughly cut route from the west that met with the track from the eastern end at Stag Flat near the Little Wanganui Saddle.

There have been many proposals for the construction of a road along the route of the track. Between 1915 and 1924 there were multiple requests for a route to enable movement of livestock between the Nelson and Karamea districts. The benefits of a fully-formed road through the Wangapeka Track were promoted In 1968, 1973, and again in 2015, but without achieving support from government.

The Wangapeka Track was incorporated into the North West Nelson Forest Park in 1970, as part of the amalgamation of eight forest parks in the region, and is now part of the Kahurangi National Park, administered by the Department of Conservation.

== History ==
The origins of the Wangapeka Track date back to the discovery of gold in the Wangapeka River in 1859, following a geological survey of New Zealand conducted for the government in that year by the geologist Ferdinand von Hochstetter. There was a further discovery of gold in the Rolling River in May 1861. The following year, explorer and surveyor John Rochfort created a basic track that went westwards from Rolling River, up the Wangapeka River valley and over the Wangapeka Saddle to the Karamea River. The work was funded by the Nelson Provincial Council, and employed gold diggers as labourers to build the track.

=== Wangapeka to Little Wanganui Saddle ===
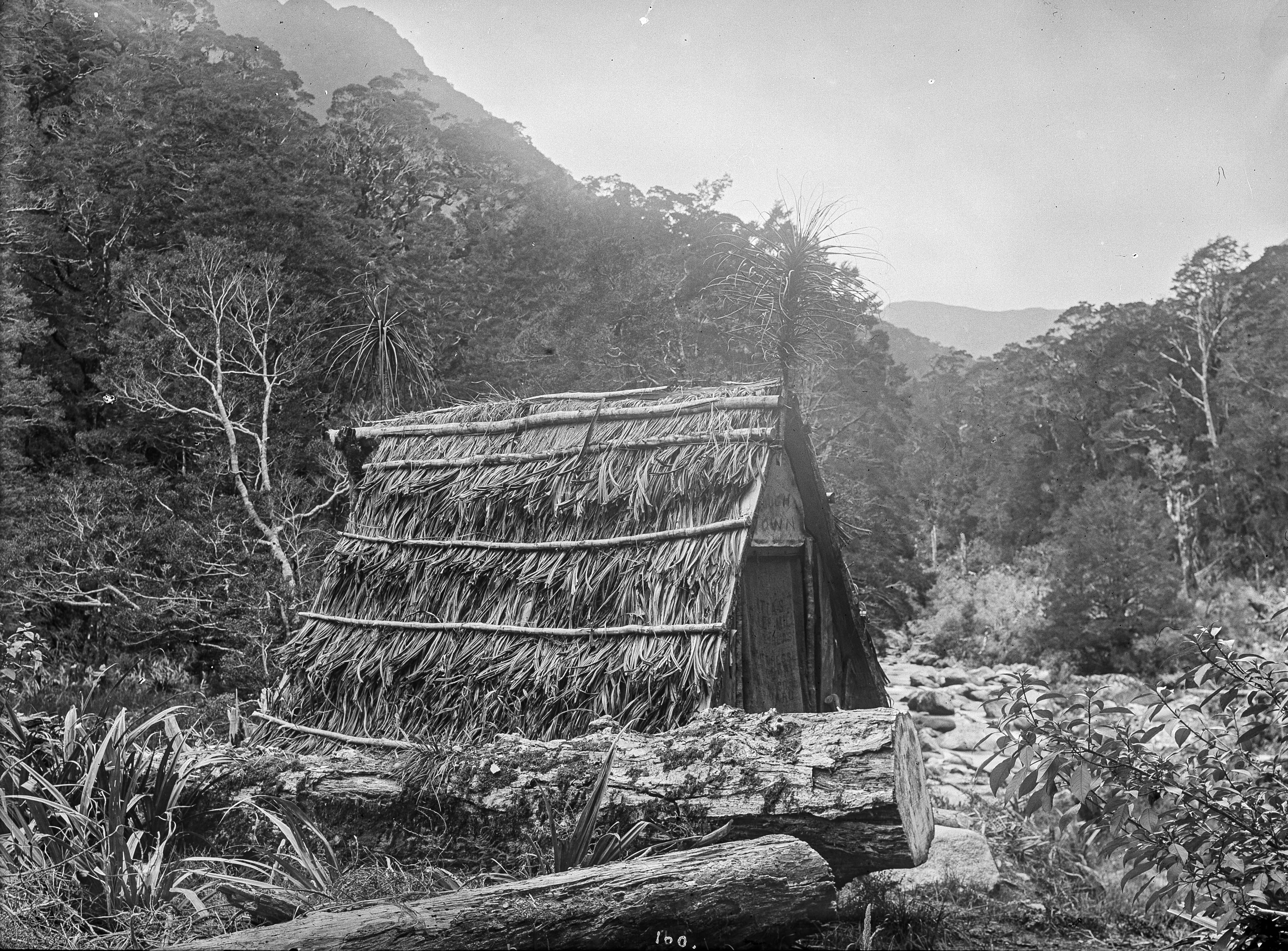
Jonathan Brough's Tabernacle c. 1899

By the mid-1880s, there was a diggers' pack track from the Rolling River to the mouth of the Kiwi Stream. In 1887, the Public Works Department constructed a packhorse track with grades suitable for carts, from Kiwi Stream to the Wangapeka Saddle. In 1895, Chief Surveyor John S Browning visited the track and reported that it had not been maintained. He inspected the rest of the proposed route to the West Coast, and estimated that a packhorse track could be completed from Wangapeka to Little Wanganui for £3,500.

Jonathan Brough was appointed to lead the construction of the track from Wangapeka Saddle to the headwaters of the Karamea River. Contracts for the construction were let in quarter-mile sections. Up to 20 men were hired to work on building the track, most of them unemployed diggers. The track reached the valley floor of the Karamea River by 1896, and through the Karamea River gorge by 1897. In 1889, Brough constructed an A‑framed shelter at a lookout point above the Taipō River at its junction with the Karamea River. This shelter became known as the Tabernacle. This era of track construction by contract ended when the track reached the present site of Taipō Hut. However, further work was completed, cutting a track through open tussock to the area now known as Stag Flat, and then in a zig-zag up the steep section to Little Wanganui Saddle.

=== Little Wanganui inland to the saddle ===
Settlers in the Little Wanganui area wanting to graze livestock inland requested the construction of a track to open up the interior for farming. A route inland from Little Wanganui was surveyed in 1894 and 3 mi (4.8 km) of packhorse track was cut, using unemployed men from the Mohikinui mine. Work progressed slowly, but by 1899 there was 4.5 mi (7.2 km) of cart road, and a pack track up the north bank of the Little Wanganui River to the gorge. From there a roughly cut route followed the river and then up the slopes of Mount Zetland to the Little Wanganui Saddle and down to Stag Flat.

=== Murchison earthquake ===
The Murchison earthquake on 17 June 1929 was a magnitude 7.3 event that caused widespread damage across the upper half of the South Island and led to 15 fatalities. The epicentre was north of the town of Murchison and close to the route of the Wangapeka Track. The earthquake created large and widespread landslides that caused severe damage to the track, and destroyed the sections of the route across the slopes of Mount Zetland to the west of the Little Wanganui Saddle. Some of the damaged sections of track were rebuilt by hiring unemployed men. The work was funded from a government scheme established during the economic depression of the 1930s to subsidise unemployed men to revisit old gold mining areas.

=== Cecil King's Hut ===
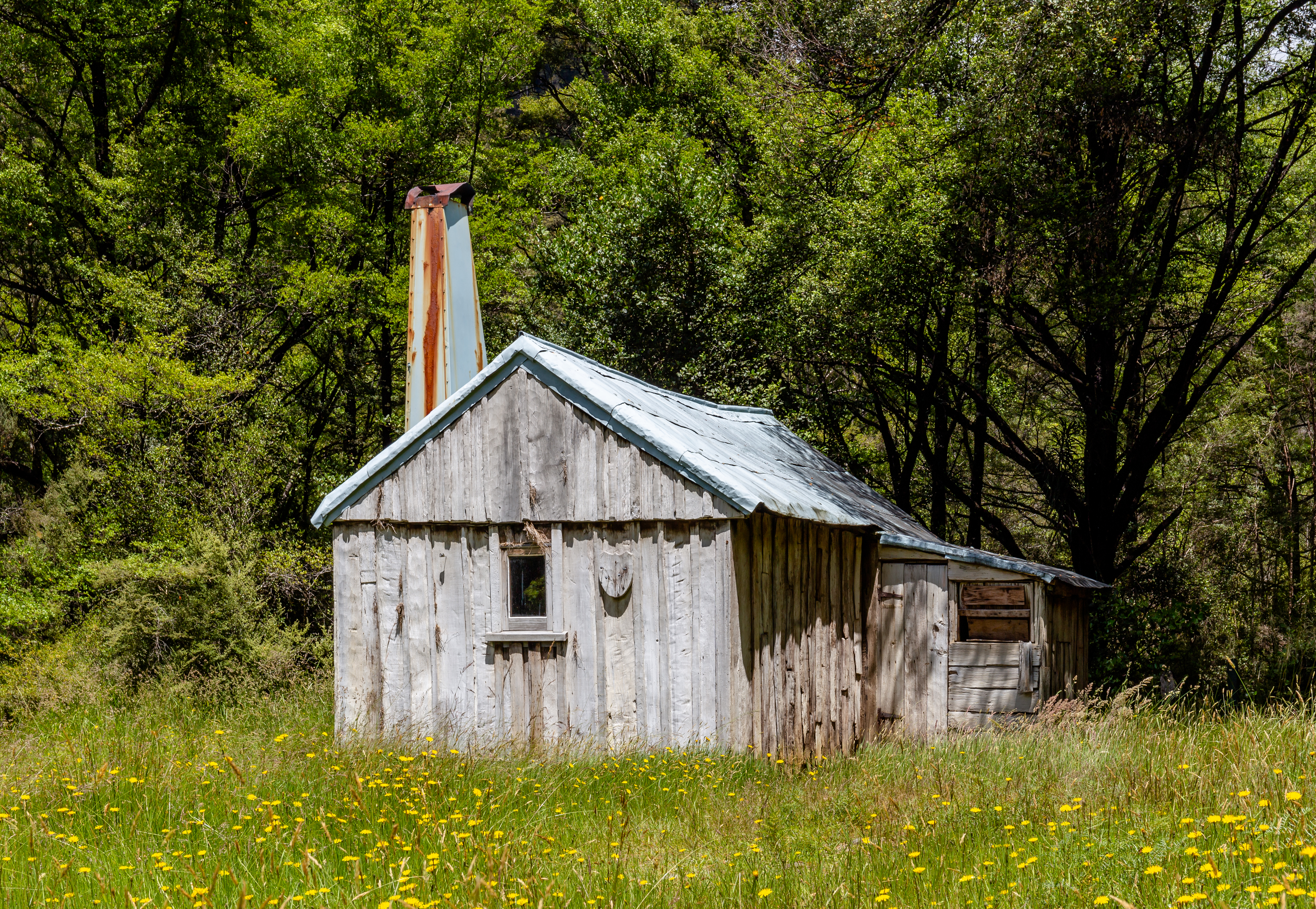
Cecil Kings Hut, Wangapeka Track

Cecil King from Wellington was one of those who went prospecting in the area of the Wangapeka River in the 1930s. Along with some other miners, in 1935 King built a small slab hut near the junction of the south and north branches of the Wangapeka River. He travelled from Wellington to live in the hut during summer times over a period of 46 years. He spent more time at the hut after he retired, and developed a flume system to assist with gold mining. King generally welcomed travellers, and was known to offer hospitality. In 1991, the hut was restored by the Department of Conservation.

=== Forest Park to National Park ===
The Wangapeka Track was incorporated into the North West Nelson Forest Park in 1970, as part of the amalgamation of eight forest parks in the region, under the management of the New Zealand Forest Service. At that time, many of the tracks in the park were overgrown. The Forest Service started on a programme of work to promote recreation in the park, including cutting new tracks and building huts. The management of the North West Nelson Forest Park was transferred to the newly formed Department of Conservation in 1987. The area of the North West Nelson Forest Park became the newly formed Kahurangi National Park in 1996.

=== Proposals for a through-road ===
Proposals for a through-route from Wangapeka to Karamea, suitable for horse-drawn vehicles, were made in 1868 by the provincial engineer. In 1915, a deputation from Nelson lobbied William Fraser, the Minister of Public Works, about the need for a Wangapeka–Karamea road to enable stock to be moved between the regions. In 1924, the Karamea Progress League lobbied the Nelson Chamber of Commerce about the urgency of completing a road over the route. There was further pressure from farming interests in 1920 and 1924 to build a road over the Wangapeka track through to Karamea, to permit stock movement between the Nelson and Karamea regions.

In 1968, the idea was proposed again, but the Minister of Works stated in a letter to the South Island Publicity Association: "The cost of constructing and maintaining a road over the high passes on the Wangapeka route and through badly faulted earthquake shattered country would be prohibitive".

A new proposal for a road through the Wangapeka track was made in 1973, as part of lobbying in opposition to the proposal for a road through the Heaphy Track. The president of the Organisation to Preserve the Heaphy advocated for a road through the Wangapeka as an alternative that would avoid a road through the Heaphy.

The idea was raised again in 2015 by the mayor of Buller as a means of boosting the West Coast economy in response to the decline of the coal industry. Points raised in opposition included the threats that a road through the Wangapeka would pose for endangered birds including rock wrens and whio (blue duck). Opposition to the latest proposal for a road included this response by Jonathan Carson of the New Zealand news website Stuff:

The Wangapeka Track provides a rare glimpse of primordial New Zealand. It feels remote and ancient. A lot has been invested into protecting the native wildlife, particularly the nationally vulnerable whio, in the area. A road would likely require widespread deforestation and destruction of habitat. Once a road is built there's no going back.

== Route ==
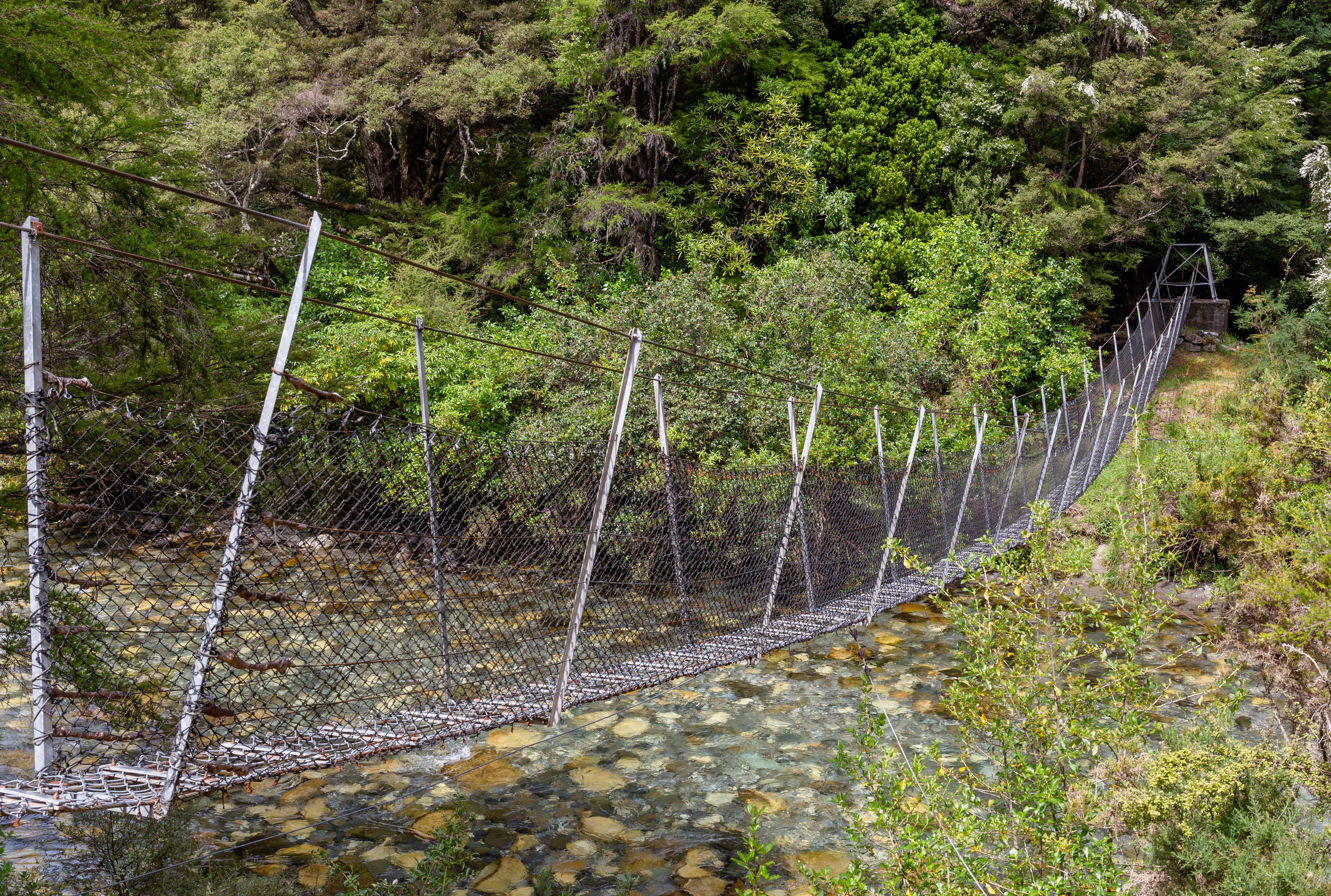
Swing bridge by Siberia Campsite

The track is in Kahurangi National Park, a protected area in the north-west of the South Island of New Zealand. The route traverses the southern end of the Kahurangi National Park from the historic Wangapeka goldfields area west of Tapawera, to the coastal plains of the West Coast at Little Wanganui. It is 59 km (37 mi) long, and crosses two saddles, each over 1,000 m (3,300 ft) in elevation. The majority of the track is in river valleys and under forest cover, with small sections in tussock land at Stag Flat and the Little Wanganui Saddle. It typically takes walkers 4–6 days to complete. The track can be walked in either direction, but the east to west journey is described here.

The eastern end of the track starts in the Wangapeka River valley 84 km (52 mi) south-west of Nelson, close to a campsite known as Siberia. At the start of the track, there is a footbridge across the Rolling River. The track then follows the true right of the Wangapeka River. There are several tributaries to cross on the route, but these are bridged. The forest in this area is regenerating from the early attempts at clearing the land for grazing. There is a bridge across the north branch of the Wangapeka River at the junction with Kiwi Stream, and from this point the route follows the true left of the Wangapeka River to Kings Creek Hut.

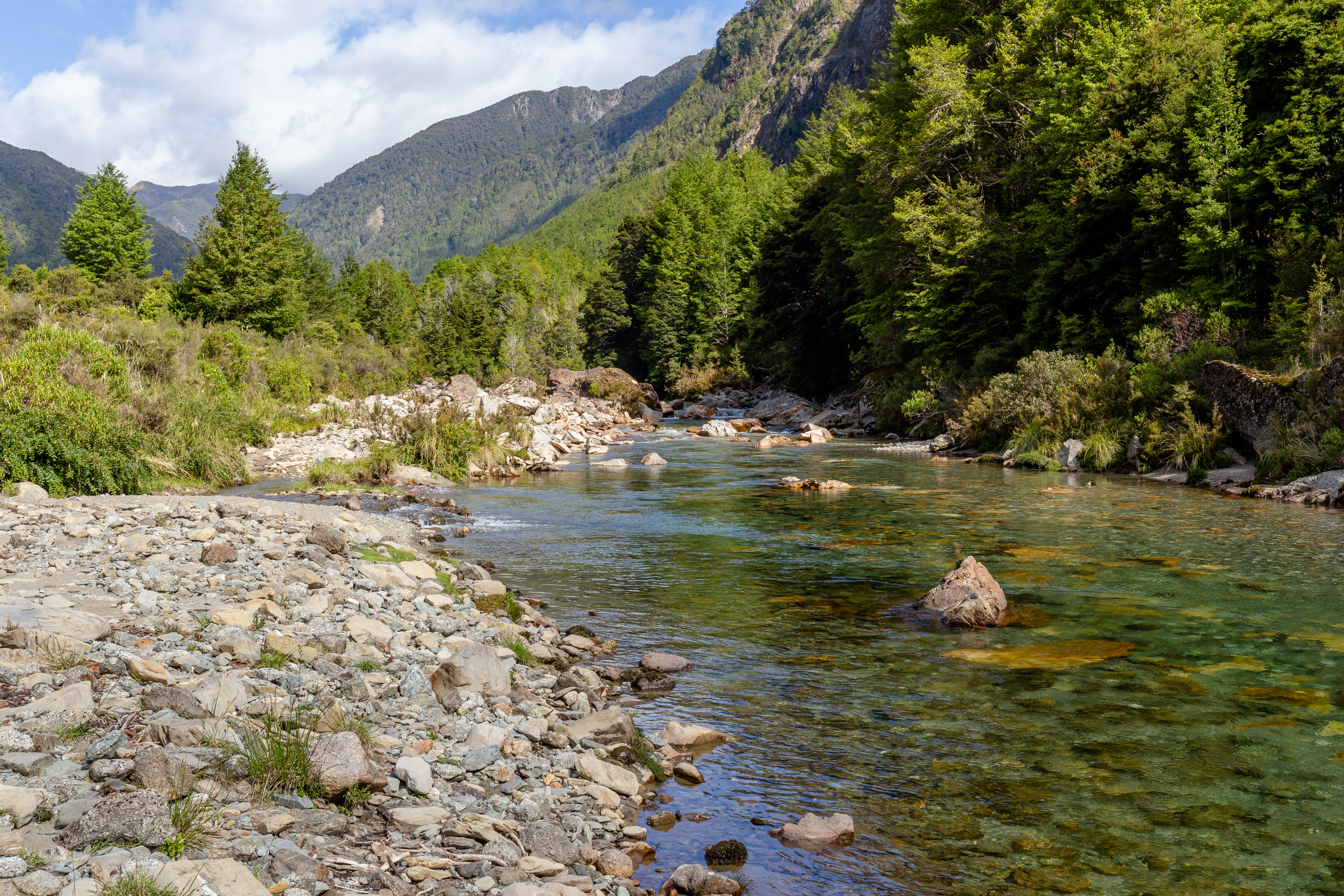
Karamea River

From Kings Creek Hut, the track passes the historic Cecil King hut and follows the true left of the Wangapeka River. The route climbs steadily to a bridge across to the true right, before reaching Stone Hut.

The route from Stone Hut climbs out of the Wangapeka River valley, crossing a large landslide. The track ascends steeply to the Wangapeka Saddle, under forest cover at an elevation of 1,009 m (3,310 ft), before descending into the Karamea River headwaters.

From the Wangapeka Saddle there is an alternative route over Biggs Tops, and then descending to Trevor Carter Hut, from where there are three alternatives for rejoining the main Wangapeka Track:

- Lost Valley Track to Helicopter Flat Hut
- Saxon Falls Track, joins the main track again near the Tabernacle lookout
- across the Karamea River and along the true left bank to Taipō River footbridge.

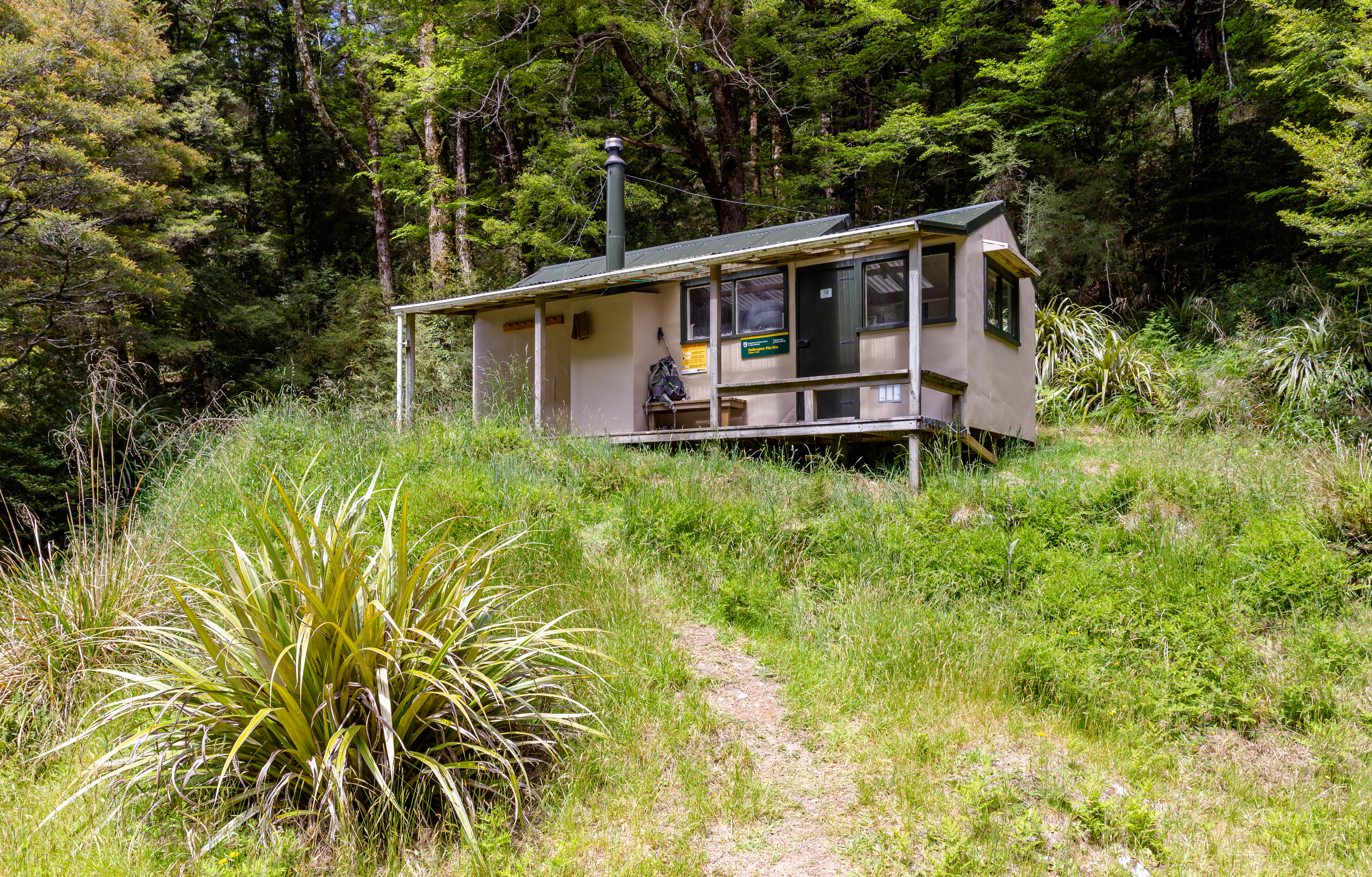
Helicopter Flat Hut

There are two options for the route from Helicopter Flat Hut. The main route climbs above the true right of the Karamea River to Brough's Tabernacle, and then into the catchment of the Taipō river and Taipō Hut. There is also a longer route via a low saddle into Lost Creek, and to the Trevor Carter Hut. From this point there are two options for rejoining the main Wangapeka Track.

From the Taipō Hut, the route gradually ascends to the Taipō River headwaters, and passes Stag Flat shelter with a steep climb to Little Wanganui Saddle – the highest elevation on the track at 1,087 m (3,566 ft). The descent from the saddle passes the Saddle Lakes before returning into the forest again. The route then descends steeply into the headwaters of the Little Wanganui River. The track crosses to the true right on a swingbridge, and then follows the true right to the Belltown Manunui Hut.

The route from Belltown Manunui Hut follows the true right of the Little Wanganui River and through an open area known as Gilmor Clearing. The track then follows an old access road before returning to the Little Wanganui River and on to the car park at the end of Wangapeka Road. The West Coast end of the track is around 80 km (50 mi) north of Westport and 18 km (11 mi) south of Karamea.

== Difficulty ==
The track is rated as medium difficulty by Barnett (2006), and is described by the Department of Conservation as challenging, requiring backcounty experience, above-average fitness and survival skills.
