= Little Crow River =

River on the South Island of New Zealand

- Route of the Little Crow River
- Mouth of the Little Crow River Little Crow River (South Island)

Location
- Country: New Zealand

Physical characteristics
- Source: Wharepapa / Arthur Range
  - coordinates: 41.29859°S 172.59996°E
- Mouth
  - location: Crow River
  - coordinates: 41°17′32″S 172°28′07″E
- Length: 7 kilometres (4.3 mi)

Basin features
- Progression: Little Crow River → Crow River → Karamea River → Ōtūmahana Estuary → Karamea Bight → Tasman Sea

The Little Crow River is a river of the northwest of New Zealand's South Island. It flows south from the southern end of the Wharepapa / Arthur Range to join with the waters of the Crow River. The entire length of the Little Crow River is within Kahurangi National Park.

== See also ==
- List of rivers of New Zealand
