= Beautiful River =

River on the South Island of New Zealand

- Route of the Beautiful River
- Mouth of the Beautiful River Beautiful River (South Island)

Location
- Country: New Zealand

Physical characteristics
- Source: Tasman Mountains
  - coordinates: 41.0824°S 172.3355°E
- Mouth
  - location: Roaring Lion River
  - coordinates: 41°11′49″S 172°25′53″E
  - elevation: about 230 m (750 ft)

Basin features
- Progression: Beautiful River → Roaring Lion River → Karamea River → Ōtūmahana Estuary → Karamea Bight → Tasman Sea

The Beautiful River is a river in the Buller district in the South island of New Zealand. It is a tributary of the Roaring Lion River.

== See also ==
- List of rivers of New Zealand
