= Huia River =

River in the Buller District, New Zealand

- Route of the Huia River
- Mouth of the Huia River Huia River (South Island)

Location
- Country: New Zealand

Physical characteristics
- Source: Confluence of the Bellbird Stream and an unnamed stream
  - coordinates: 41.3067°S 172.2547°E
- Mouth
  - location: Kākāpō River
  - coordinates: 41°16′58″S 172°16′04″E
- Length: 8 kilometres (5.0 mi)

Basin features
- Progression: Huia River → Kākāpō River → Karamea River → Ōtūmahana Estuary → Karamea Bight → Tasman Sea

The Huia River is a river of New Zealand's South Island West Coast. It flows north to meet with the Kākāpō River two kilometres before the latter flows into the Karamea River, 17 kilometres to the east of Karamea.

== See also ==
- List of rivers of New Zealand
