= Taipō River =

River in the Buller District, New Zealand

- Route of the Taipō River
- Mouth of the Taipō River Taipō River (South Island)

Location
- Country: New Zealand

Physical characteristics
- Source: Mount Zetland
  - coordinates: 41.3947°S 172.2795°E
  - elevation: 1,220 metres (4,000 ft)
- Mouth
  - location: Karamea River
  - coordinates: 41°23′42″S 172°22′33″E
  - elevation: 505 metres (1,657 ft)
- Length: 8 kilometres (5.0 mi)

Basin features
- Progression: Taipō River → Karamea River → Ōtūmahana Estuary → Karamea Bight → Tasman Sea
- Tributaries
  - left: Pannikin Creek, Herbert Creek

The Taipō River is a river of the northern West Coast Region of New Zealand's South Island. It flows east from its sources at Mount Zetland, fed by many streams draining the north side of the Allen Range to reach the Karamea River 25 kilometres southeast of Karamea.

The Wangapeka Track follows the left bank of the Taipō River for almost its entire length, having crossed the Little Wanganui Saddle. The Taipo hut is located midway down the valley.
