= Leslie River =

River on the South Island of New Zealand

- Route of the Leslie River
- Mouth of the Leslie River Leslie River (South Island)

Location
- Country: New Zealand

Physical characteristics
- Source: Wharepapa / Arthur Range
  - coordinates: 41.2046°S 172.6829°E
- Mouth
  - location: Karamea River
  - coordinates: 41°13′58″S 172°30′29″E
- Length: 12 kilometres (7.5 mi)

Basin features
- Progression: Leslie River → Karamea River → Ōtūmahana Estuary → Karamea Bight → Tasman Sea
- Tributaries
  - left: Twins Creek, Arthur Creek, Meyer Stream, Wilkinson Creek
  - right: Peel Stream, Hodges Stream

The Leslie River is a river of the northwest of New Zealand's South Island located in the Buller District. A tributary of the Karamea River, the Leslie flows west from the Wharepapa / Arthur Range, meeting the Karamea 28 kilometres (17 mi) east of the town of Karamea. The river's entire length is within Kahurangi National Park.

== See also ==
- List of rivers of New Zealand
