= Roaring Lion River =

River on the South Island of New Zealand

- Route of the Roaring Lion River
- Mouth of the Roaring Lion River Roaring Lion River (South Island)

Location
- Country: New Zealand

Physical characteristics
- Source: Tasman Mountains
  - coordinates: 41.0539°S 172.353°E
- Mouth
  - location: Karamea River
  - coordinates: 41°12′07″S 172°25′47″E
- Length: 24 kilometres (15 mi)

Basin features
- Progression: Roaring Lion River → Karamea River → Ōtūmahana Estuary → Karamea Bight → Tasman Sea
- Tributaries
  - left: Breakfast Creek, Cub Stream
  - right: Discovery Creek, Downey Creek, Cavern Creek, Grace Creek, Beautiful River

The Roaring Lion River is a river in the Buller District of New Zealand's South Island located in Kahurangi National Park. It flows southeast from its source in the Tasman Mountains to the east of Mount Domett, gradually turning southwest before reaching the Karamea River 25 kilometres (16 mi) east of Karamea.

== See also ==
- List of rivers of New Zealand
