= Ugly River =

River in the Buller District, New Zealand

- Route of the Ugly River
- Mouth of the Ugly River Ugly River (South Island)

Location
- Country: New Zealand

Physical characteristics
- Source: Amohia Peak
  - coordinates: 41.0202°S 172.3126°E
- Mouth
  - location: Karamea River
  - coordinates: 41°11′44″S 172°19′22″E
- Length: 21 kilometres (13 mi)

Basin features
- Progression: Ugly River → Karamea River → Ōtūmahana Estuary → Karamea Bight → Tasman Sea
- Tributaries
  - left: Domett Creek, McNabb Creek
  - right: Harley Creek, Rubble Creek

The Ugly River is a river of the West Coast Region of New Zealand's South Island. It flows south to reach the Karamea River 17 kilometres northeast of Karamea. The river's entire length is within Kahurangi National Park.

== See also ==
- List of rivers of New Zealand
