= Crow River (West Coast) =

River on the South Island of New Zealand

- Route of the Crow River
- Mouth of the Crow River Crow River (West Coast) (South Island)

Location
- Country: New Zealand

Physical characteristics
- Source: Wharepapa / Arthur Range
  - coordinates: 41.29859°S 172.59996°E
  - elevation: 1,075 m (3,527 ft)
- Mouth
  - location: Karamea River
  - coordinates: 41°17′32″S 172°28′07″E
  - elevation: 313 m (1,027 ft)
- Length: 26 km (16 mi)

Basin features
- Progression: Crow River → Karamea River → Ōtūmahana Estuary → Karamea Bight → Tasman Sea
- Tributaries
  - left: Taylor Stream, Kinzett Stream,
  - right: Little Crow River

The Crow River is a river located in Kahurangi National Park in the West Coast Region of New Zealand. It arises in the Wharepapa / Arthur Range and flows south-west and then north-west into the Karamea River. The river may be named after the South Island kōkako, sometimes called the orange-wattled crow.

Brown trout can be fished in the river.

A backcountry hut is available for trampers near the junction with the Karamea River.

== See also ==
- List of rivers of New Zealand
