= Kākāpō River =

River in the Buller District, New Zealand

- Route of the Kākāpō River
- Mouth of the Kākāpō River Kākāpō River (South Island)

Location
- Country: New Zealand

Physical characteristics
- Source
  - coordinates: 41.3553°S 172.3442°E
- Mouth
  - location: Karamea River
  - coordinates: 41°15′34″S 172°16′01″E
- Length: 15 kilometres (9.3 mi)

Basin features
- Progression: Kākāpō River → Karamea River → Ōtūmahana Estuary → Karamea Bight → Tasman Sea
- Tributaries
  - left: Huia River
  - right: Cuckoo Creek

The Kākāpō River is a river of New Zealand. It is located in the West Coast Region of the South Island. The river flows northwest from its source three kilometres west of Mount Kendall, reaching its outflow into the Karamea River 15 kilometres from the latter's mouth.

== See also ==
- List of rivers of New Zealand
