= Dart River (Tasman) =

River in the Tasman District, New Zealand

- Route of the Dart River
- Mouth of the Dart River Dart River (Tasman) (South Island)

Location
- Country: New Zealand

Physical characteristics
- Source: Lookout Range, Hope Range
  - coordinates: 41.5802°S 172.5989°E
- Mouth
  - location: Wangapeka River
  - coordinates: 41°25′07″S 172°39′01″E

Basin features
- Progression: Dart River → Wangapeka River → Motueka River → Tasman Bay → Tasman Sea
- Tributaries
  - right: Christian Creek, Thomas Creek

The Dart River arises in the Kahurangi National Park between the Lookout and Hope Ranges in the Tasman Region of New Zealand. It flows northward to join the Wangapeka River, which is a tributary of the Motueka River.
