= Wangapeka River =

River in the Tasman District, New Zealand

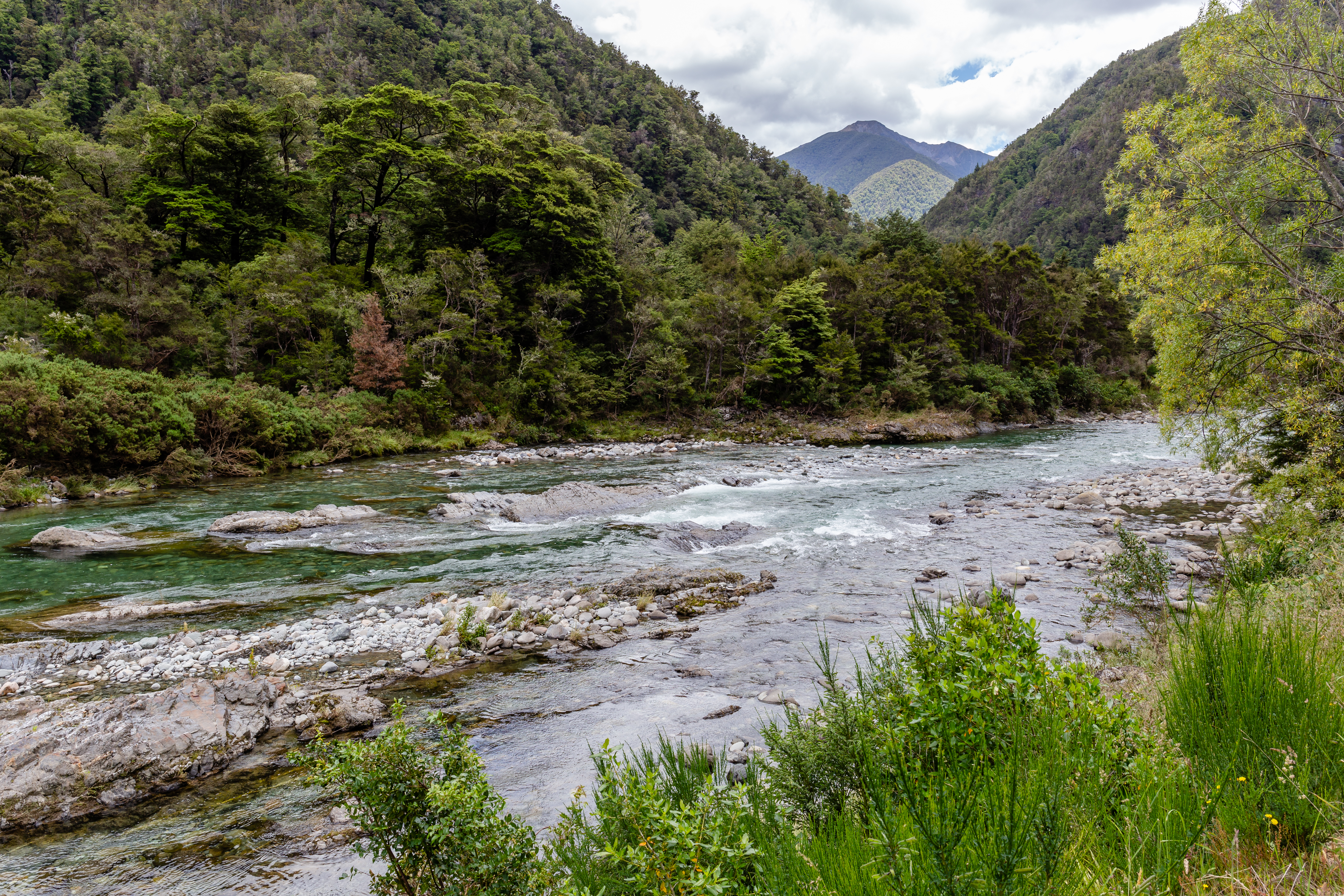
- Route of the Wangapeka River
- Mouth of the Wangapeka River Wangapeka River (South Island)

Location
- Country: New Zealand

Physical characteristics
- Source: Wangapeka Saddle (north branch)
  - coordinates: 41.4235°S 172.4215°E
- 2nd source: Marino Mountains (south branch)
  - coordinates: 41.5514°S 172.4655°E
- Mouth
  - location: Motueka River
  - coordinates: 41°19′43″S 172°47′12″E
- Length: 37 km (23 mi)

Basin features
- Progression: Wangapeka River → Motueka River → Tasman Bay → Tasman Sea
- Tributaries
  - left: Stone Creek (north branch), Luna Stream (north branch), Boyd Stream (south branch), Robson Stream (south branch), Kiwi Stream, Patriarch Stream, Gibbs Creek, Chummie Creek, Chandler Creek, Prospect Creek, Coal Creek, McRae Creek
  - right: Loaf Creek (south branch), Wright Creek, Rolling River, Prices Creek, Dart River, Bushend Creek, Sherry River, Caves Creek, Blue Rock Creek

The Wangapeka River is a river of the Tasman Region of New Zealand's South Island. It rises in two branches, the North Branch and the South Branch, in the Matiri Range within Kahurangi National Park, meeting some 25 kilometres southeast of Karamea. It flows generally northeast to reach the Motueka River 30 kilometres south of Motueka.

The Wangapeka valley was the site of a major goldfield during the late 1860s, and is mentioned in some versions of the New Zealand folk song "Bright Fine Gold".

== See also ==
- List of rivers of New Zealand
- Wangapeka Track
