= Sherry River =

River in the Tasman District, New Zealand

- Route of the Sherry River
- Mouth of the Sherry River Sherry River (South Island)

Location
- Country: New Zealand

Physical characteristics
- Source: Hope Range
  - coordinates: 41.55068°S 172.66133°E
- Mouth
  - location: Wangapeka River
  - coordinates: 41°22′22″S 172°44′07″E
- Length: 25 km (16 mi)

Basin features
- Progression: Sherry River → Wangapeka River → Motueka River → Tasman Bay → Tasman Sea
- Tributaries
  - left: Deception Creek, Stink Creek, Monday Creek, Appletree Creek, Granite Creek, Painkiller Creek, Quentin Creek, Blake Creek, Winding Creek, Poverty Creek, Granity Creek, Campbell Creek, Sailor Gully, Pancake Creek, Blue Mud Creek, Orchard Creek
  - right: Burmeister Stream, Sunday Creek, Slippery Creek, Biggs Creek, Harford Creek, Green Hill Creek

The Sherry River is a river in New Zealand's Tasman Region. It flows north from its origins in the Hope Range to meet the Wangapeka River eight kilometres from the latter's outflow into the Motueka River.

== See also ==
- List of rivers of New Zealand
