= Rolling River =

River in the Tasman District, New Zealand

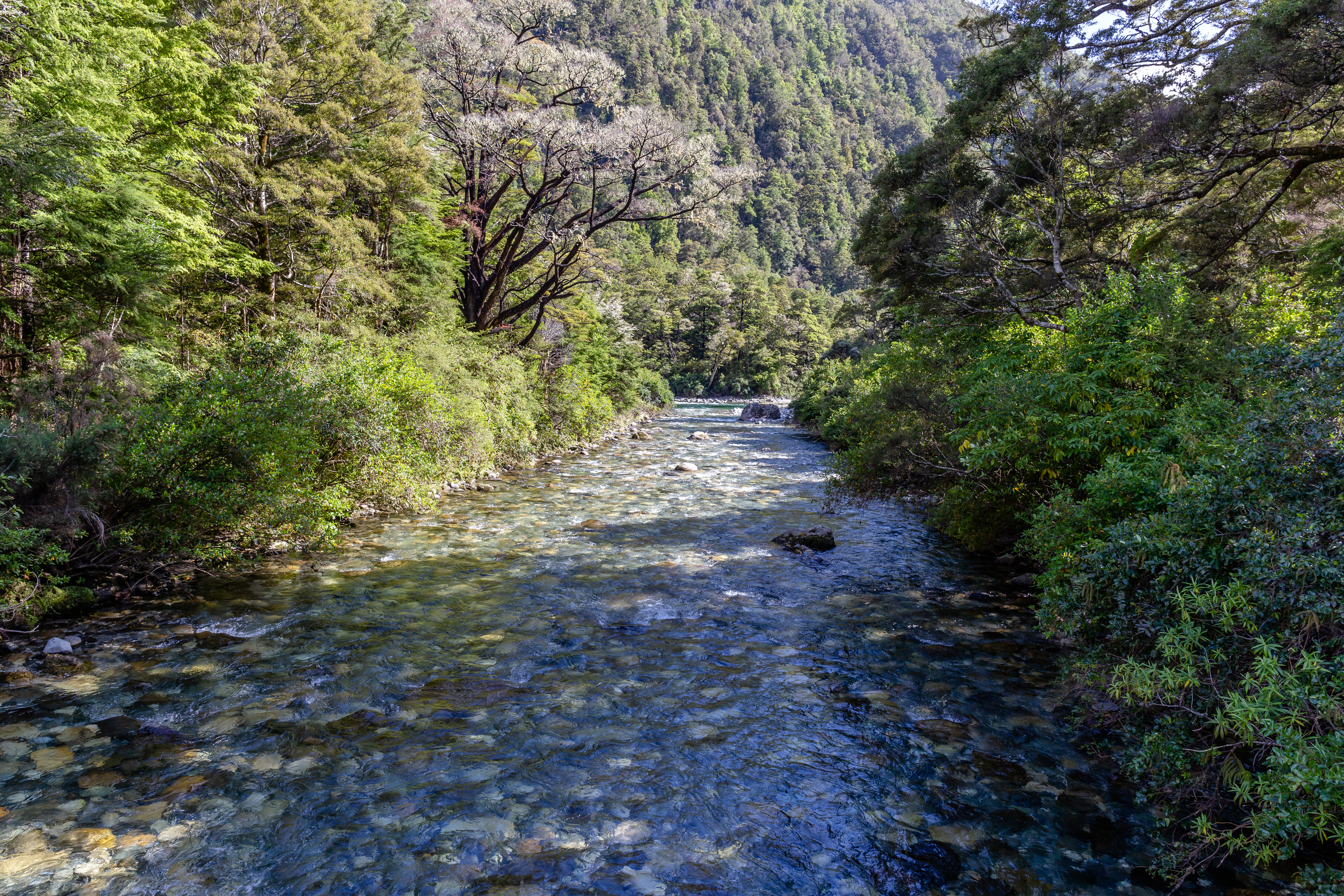
- Route of the Rolling River
- Mouth of the Rolling River Rolling River (South Island)

Location
- Country: New Zealand

Physical characteristics
- Source
  - location: Confluence of Nuggety Creek and Blue Creek
  - coordinates: 41°28′10″S 172°33′54″E
- Mouth
  - location: Wangapeka River
  - coordinates: 41°26′36″S 172°34′52″E
- Length: 5 kilometres (3.1 mi)

Basin features
- Progression: Rolling River → Wangapeka River → Motueka River → Tasman Bay → Tasman Sea
- Tributaries
  - right: Granity Creek, Conor Creek

The Rolling River is a short river of the Tasman Region of New Zealand's South Island. It is formed by the confluence of several streams - Nuggety Creek, Blue Creek, and Granity Creek - and flows north to reach the Wangapeka River 12 kilometres north of Mount Owen.

== See also ==
- List of rivers of New Zealand
