= Karamea River =

River in the Buller District, New Zealand

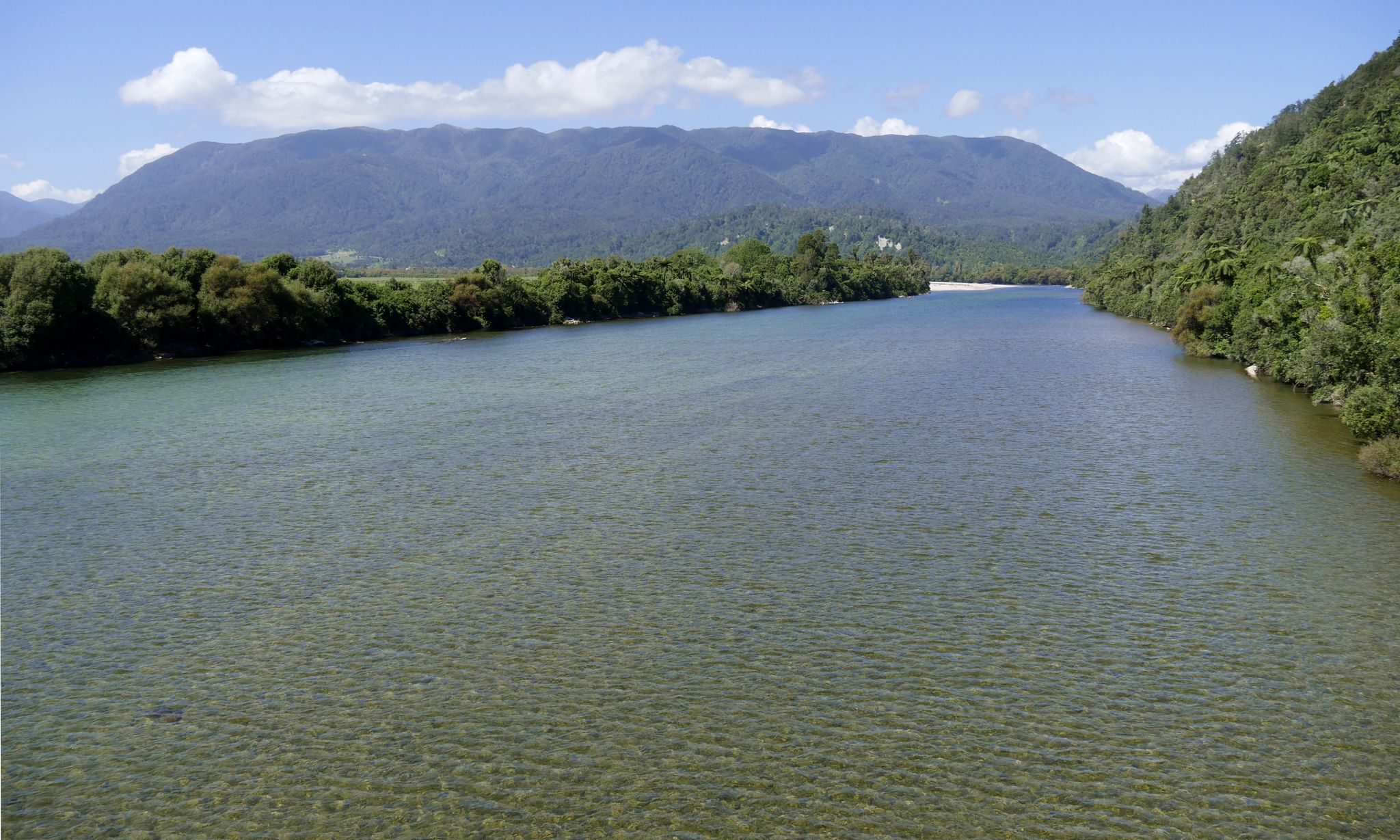
- Route of the Karamea River
- Mouth of the Karamea River Karamea River (South Island)

Location
- Country: New Zealand

Physical characteristics
- Source: Biggs Tops
  - coordinates: 41.4117°S 172.4039°E
  - elevation: 1,384 metres (4,541 ft)
- Mouth
  - location: Ōtūmahana Estuary
  - coordinates: 41°15′18″S 172°06′30″E
  - elevation: 0 metres (0 ft)
- Length: 73 kilometres (45 mi)
- Basin size: 1,210 km^{2} (470 mi^{2})

Basin features
- Progression: Karamea River → Ōtūmahana Estuary → Karamea Bight → Tasman Sea
- Tributaries
  - left: Waters Creek, Taipō River, Kendall Creek, Orbit Creek, Apollo Creek, Mars Creek, Thor Creek, Atlas Creek, Mercury Creek, Venus Creek, Jupiter Creek, Saturn Creek, Silvermine Creek, Questa Creek, Pyramid Creek, Kākāpō River, Kelly Creek, Office Creek, Elford Creek, Jordan Creek, Gillbank Creek,
  - right: Lost Valley Creek, Meteor Creek, Lunik Creek, Star Creek, Comet Creek, Satellite Creek, Apogee Creek, Perigee Creek, Sputnik Creek, Crow River, Slippery Creek, Leslie River, Roaring Lion River, False Creek, Ferris Creek, Ugly River, Fuchsia Creek, Greys Creek, Little Grey Creek, Virgin Creek, Coopers Creek
- Waterfalls: Saxon Falls
- Bridges: Karamea Bridge

The Karamea River is located in the West Coast Region of the South Island of New Zealand. The river rises within Kahurangi National Park in the Matiri Range of the Southern Alps. The river rises to the east of Mount Allen, meandering west briefly before turning north. After some 25 km (16 mi) it again turns west, to enter a series of small lakes where its waters are joined by those of the Roaring Lion River. From here the river continues west through steep-sided valleys before leaving the national park and reaching its floodplain 10 km (6.2 mi) from the coast of the Tasman Sea. The river passes the small settlements of Umere and Arapito before reaching the Ōtūmahana Estuary and the Tasman Sea close to the township of Karamea.

The river has a catchment area, including its tributaries, of 1,210 km^{2} (470 mi^{2}), representing around 23% of the entire area of Kahurangi National Park.

== Flood risk ==
There is a history of flooding from the Karamea River. In 1899, a large flood swept away a new bridge across the river and caused damage to settlers homes, farms and crops. Another major flood caused serious damage in January 1915, inundating the main street and the majority of houses.

The Murchison earthquake on 17 June 1929 led to debris blocking the existing mouth of the Karamea River, and a new outlet to the sea formed from the Ōtūmahana lagoon around 1.6 kilometres (0.99 mi) to the south of the existing outlet. Deposits of silt raised the level of the river bed and led to a greatly increased risk of flooding in the townships of Karamea and Market Cross. On 30 December 1929 there was heavy damage in Karamea and Arapito from a sudden flood attributed to the breach of a dam created during the earthquake. In April 1931, floodwaters entered most of the homes around Market Cross, and some in the Karamea township. In August 1931, the settlers were given access to relief funding from the West Coast Earthquake Relief Fund for the damage caused by these floods.

Over the next few years, stop banks and training walls were constructed on the north side of the river to help mitigate the flood risk to the town. In May 1936 the Karamea School Committee notified the Education Board of their concerns about the damage caused by repeated flooding of the school. Relocation to a new site was proposed. In October 1936 there was a further major flood that entered 40 houses in Karamea and Market Cross. In September 1937, a large flood led to the river breaking through to the sea at the location of the old river mouth, cutting a new channel that greatly reduced the flood risk to the town and enabled the entry of vessels at high tide. Further river protection works were installed between 1938 and 1940, and these successfully defended the township during a heavy flood in the river in February 1940.

In an extreme weather event in December 2010, the flow in the river reached the second highest ever recorded, at 3,125 cumecs. The peak flow did not coincide with the time of high tide, and this reduced the level of flooding compared with the flooding experienced in 1998.

Survey records since 1912 indicate that there have been either single or double openings to the sea from the Ōtūmahana Estuary, and that these openings have migrated over 4.5 km (2.8 mi) of shoreline since records began. Between 2008 and 2010, the two openings merged at a location giving a direct exit to the sea for the Karamea River. From December 2010, the combined opening migrated south. Between 2013 and 2015, the channel moved further south by over 2 km (1.2 mi). In 2016, the channel was 3 km (1.9 mi) south of the most direct route from the river to the sea. This new location increases the risk of flooding in some areas of Karamea. A report to the West Coast Regional Council in 2016 recommended mechanical excavation of a breach channel to allow the next major flood to cut a new direct route to the sea, and mitigate the flood risk.

== Rafting ==
The Karamea River is a highly rated wilderness river for rafting expeditions. A 30 km (19 mi) rafting journey is possible over three days, passing through Grade 3 rapids in the upper reaches to Grade 5 rapids in the Karamea Gorge.

== See also ==
- List of rivers of New Zealand
