= Ōtūmahana Estuary =

- Karamea Estuary
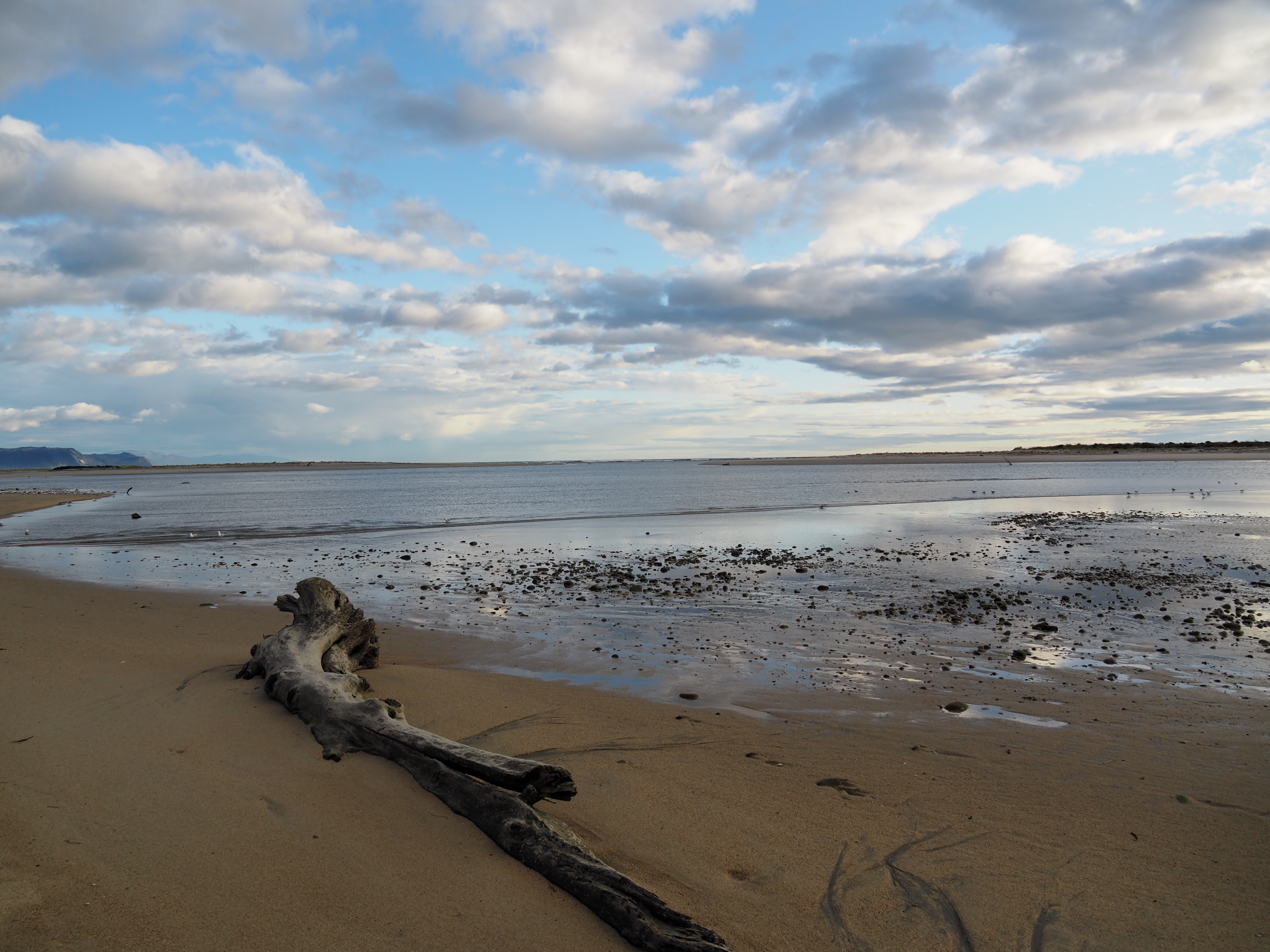

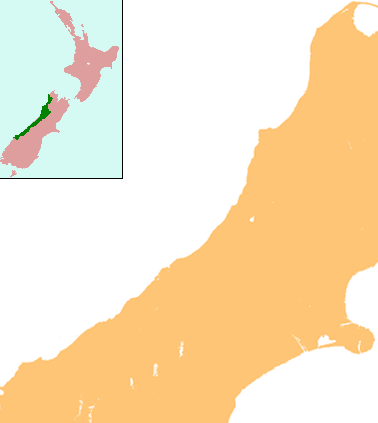
- Location within West Coast
- Location: Buller District
- Coordinates: 41°16′S 172°6′E
- Type: Brackish lagoon
- River sources: Karamea River, Granite Creek
- Primary outflows: Tasman Sea
- Surface area: 400 hectares (990 acres)

Ōtūmahana Estuary, also known as the Karamea Estuary, is a tidal estuary in the Buller District of the West Coast Region of New Zealand. It is located at the mouth of the Karamea River and also receives the outflow of Ōtūmahana creek (also known as Granite Creek).

The estuary is the third largest tidal estuary on the West Coast, after Ōkārito Lagoon and Saltwater Lagoon. It has been classified as a Significant Wetland by the West Coast Regional Council in its Regional Land and Water Plan.

A life-size bronze statue of the extinct Haast's eagle or hōkioi was erected in Karamea in 2020. The initiative was a joint undertaking of the Karamea Estuary Enhancement Project and local iwi Ngāti Waewae. The hōkioi represents the spiritual guardian of the estuary. The statue is called Te Maia Kahurangi, and was unveiled on 22 February 2020. It depicts the ancestor Maia who rode an eagle he raised from a chick. It was cast in bronze by Gillie and Marc and is 300 cm high.

Survey records since 1912 indicate that there have been either single or double openings to the sea from the Ōtūmahana Estuary, and that these openings have migrated over 4.5 kilometres (2.8 mi) of shoreline since records began. Between 2008 and 2010, the two openings merged at a location giving a direct exit to the sea for the Karamea River. From December 2010, the combined opening migrated south. Between 2013 and 2015, the channel moved further south by over 2 kilometres (1.2 mi). In 2016, the channel was 3 kilometres (1.9 mi) south of the most direct route from the river to the sea. This southern location increases the risk of flooding in some areas of Karamea. A report to the West Coast Regional Council in 2016 recommended mechanical excavation of a breach channel to allow the next major flood to cut a new direct route to the sea, and mitigate the flood risk. Breach channels were constructed at the north end of the spit and a direct path was opened to the sea in 2017. The Regional Council cautioned that further interventions could be required in future to keep the outlet in a northern location.

== Gallery ==
Ōtūmahana Estuary

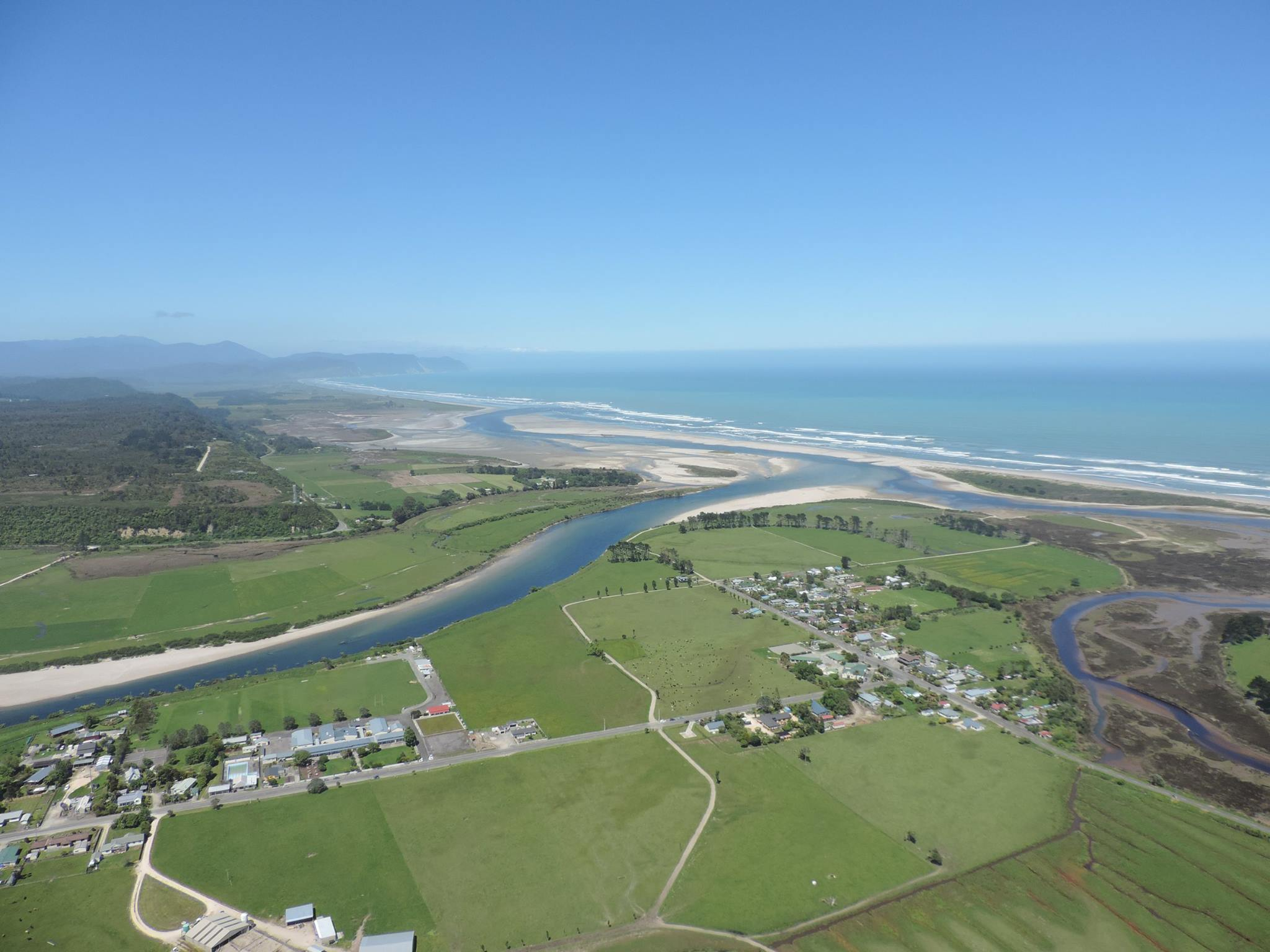
Karamea River and estuary in 2016

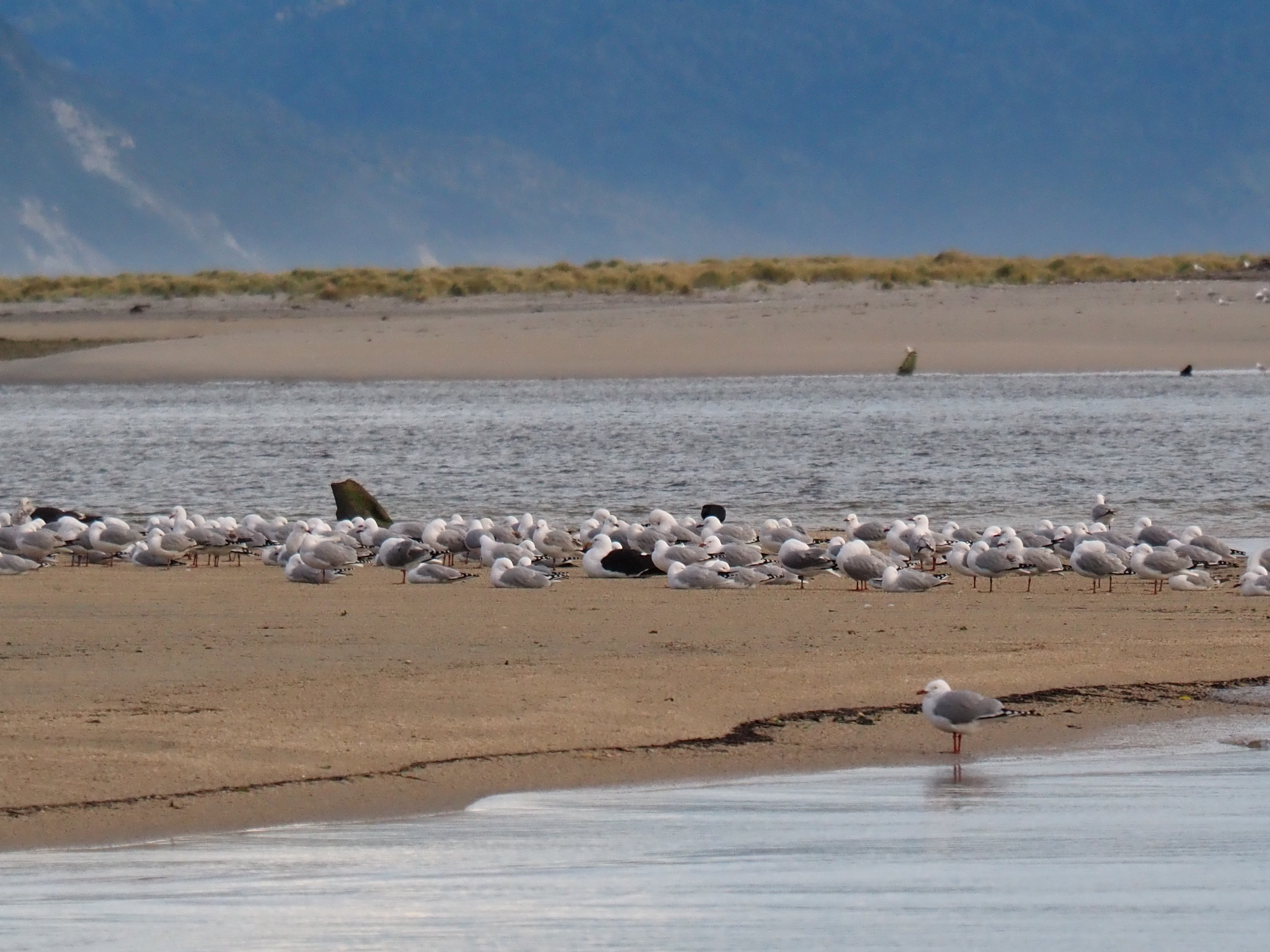

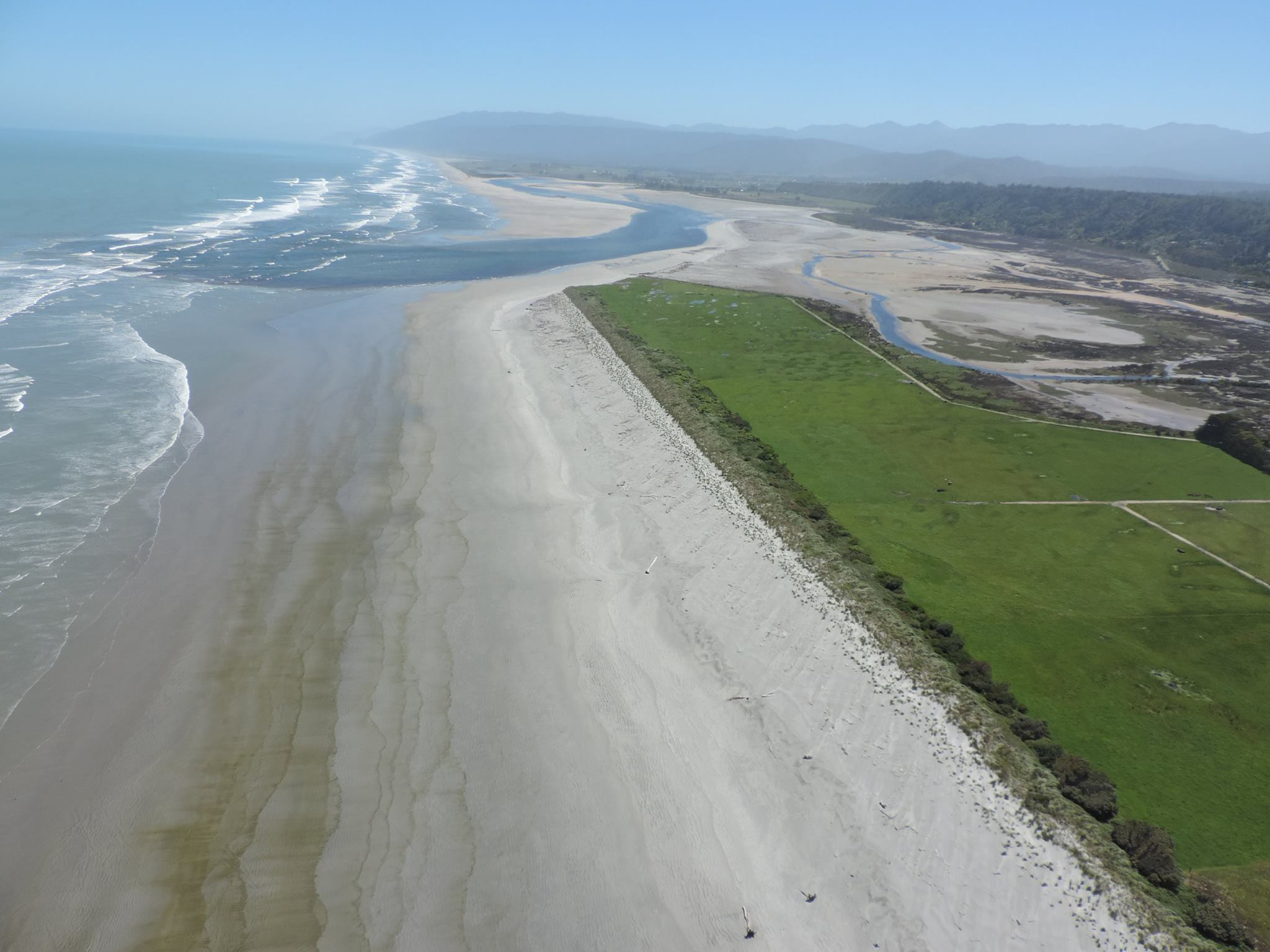
Outlet from estuary in 2016

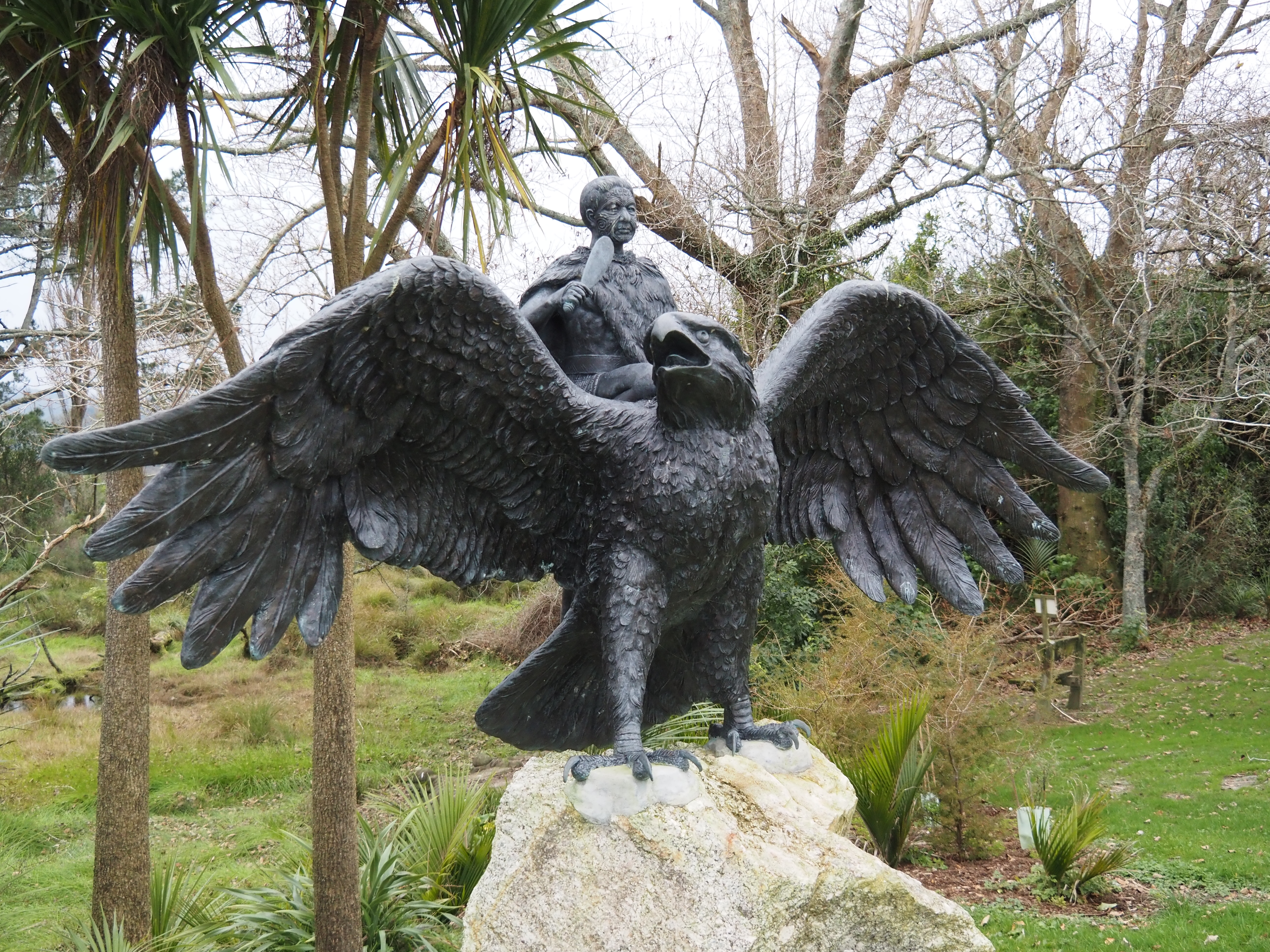
Hōkioi statue

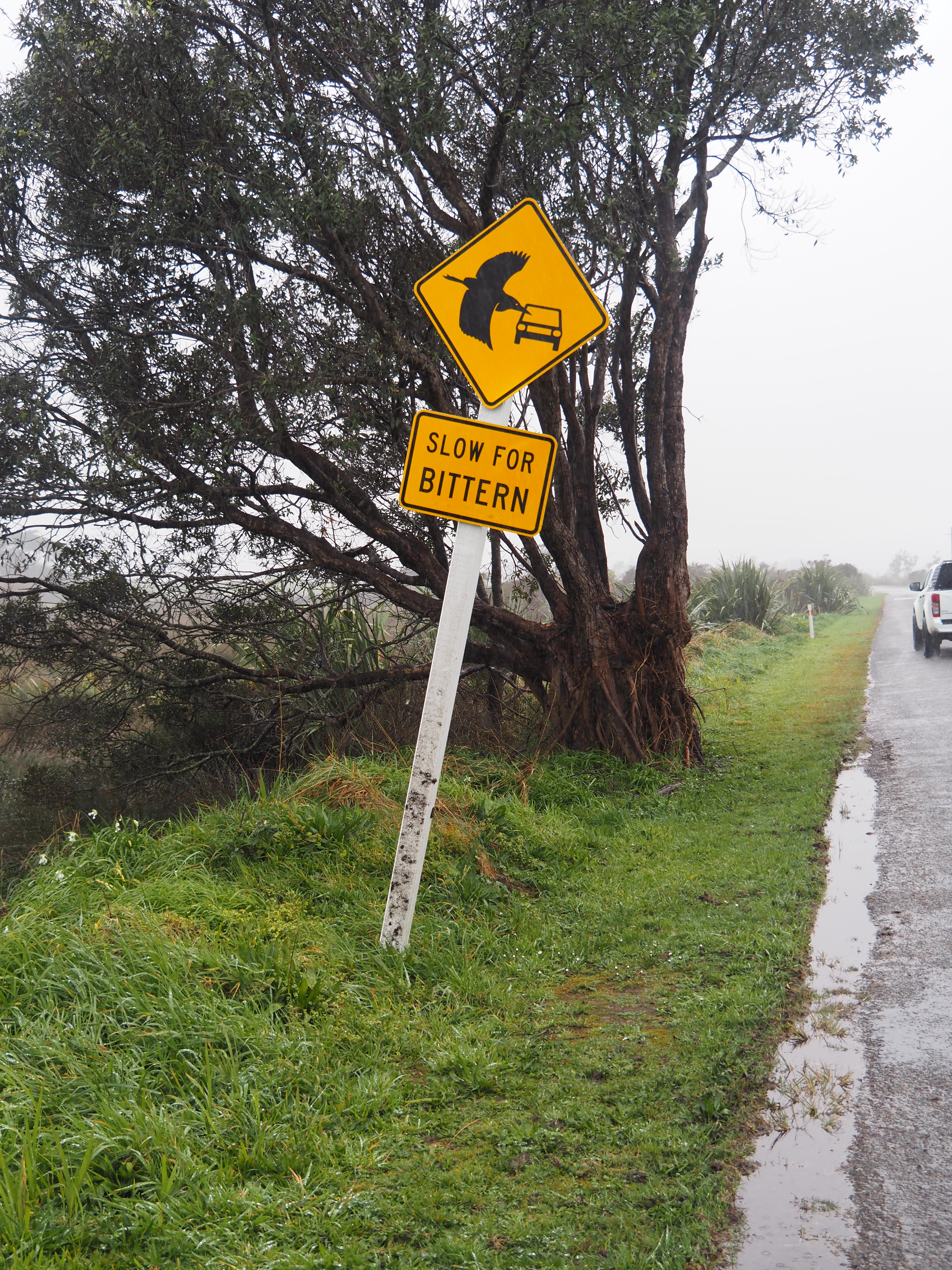
