= Haast to Paringa Cattle Track =

New Zealand tramping track

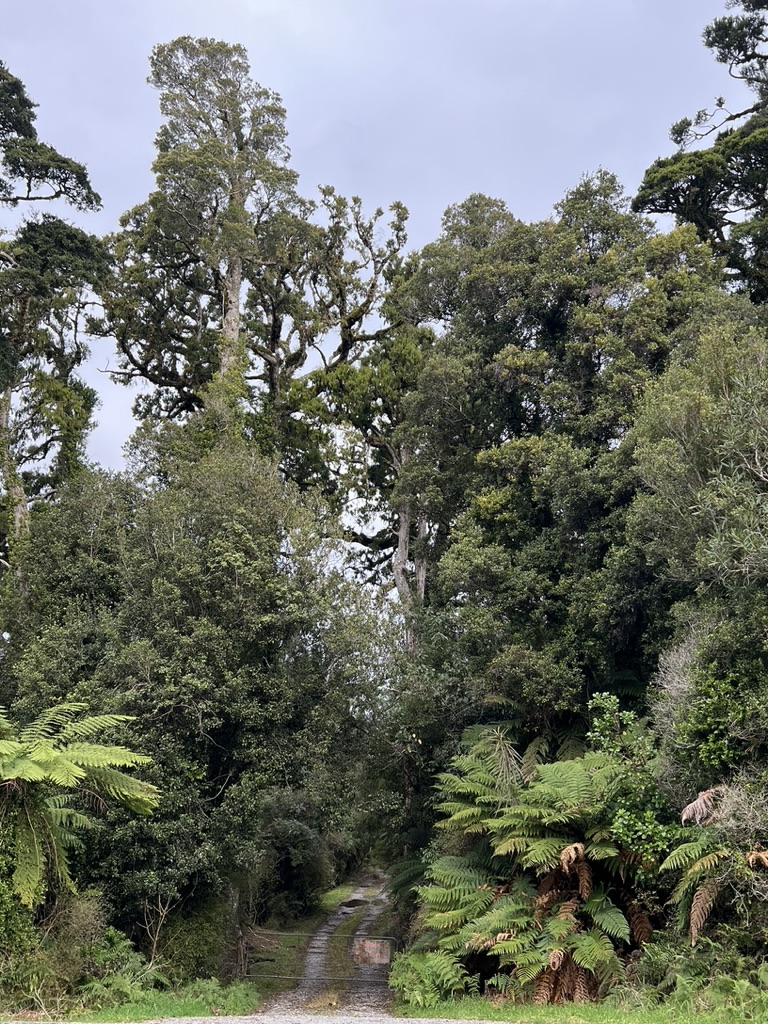
- Southern trailhead
- Length: 33 km (21 mi)
- Location: southern Westland District
- Established: 1981
- Trailheads: Waita River car park 43.791915°S 169.120102°E; Windbag Valley 43.773573°S 169.354248°E
- Use: Tramping
- Difficulty: Advanced
- Season: all year
- Hazards: slips, flooding, fallen trees
- Maintained by: Department of Conservation

The historic Haast to Paringa Cattle Track is a trail through South Westland, New Zealand, constructed in 1875 to allow farmers in the Landsborough and Cascade Valley area to drive their cattle on an annual two-week journey to the sale yards in Whataroa. It was constructed as an inland loop to bypass the precipitous cliffs at Knights Point. For 90 years it was the only land access to the settlements of Haast and Jackson Bay, but the last mob of cattle was driven in 1961, and the construction of a highway connecting Paringa to Haast Pass in 1965 made it redundant. After falling into disuse, the cattle track was converted into a 33-kilometre (21 mi), three-day tramping track, opening in 1981. The track and its three huts (Blue River/Blowfly, Māori Saddle, and Coppermine Creek) are maintained by the New Zealand Department of Conservation.

== History ==
The cattle track follows the route of an old Māori trail. To avoid the steep cliffs and rugged coastline around Knights Point (an area that was labelled by early diggers "run-or-be-damned") travellers up and down the West Coast would head inland along the Waita and Moeraki Rivers, crossing the low (700 m) Paringa Saddle.

The Westland County Council in 1871 decided to clear tracks from Bruce Bay to Haast, and offered contracts of £1380 for 37 miles and £800 for 19 miles. The explorer Charlie Douglas, along with Julies Matthies and a man by the name of McGloin, undertook to clear bush from Lake Paringa to the mouth of the Waita River, the route of the current track. Later contracts formed the road to a width of 4–9 feet, and metalled it with gravel to a depth of 6 inches. All shingle was taken in by wheelbarrow, and unmortered stone culverts were built over waterways. The road was suitable for pack mules and horses, and later enlarged to accommodate drays.

The track took over ten years to complete. By 1882 15 km of the "Mahitahi–Haast" road had been finished (at a cost of £2779), and in 1883 only "three and a half miles" were still to be done, according to the report by Gerhard Mueller.

A road over the Paringa Saddle would be an important connection for the South Westland settlements of Haast, Okuru, and Jackson Bay, which even into the first half of the 20th century were still isolated from the rest of New Zealand. A ship would arrive every two or three months with supplies, but the land access was via the Haast Pass, a route only suitable for horses, rugged, over 80 km long, and requiring boat transport down Lake Wānaka at the end.

By 1875 mobs of cattle were already being driven from the Arawhata and Cascade river valleys north over the Paringa Saddle—now a shorter and easier alternative to the journey over Haast Pass. Mail was taken over the cattle track fortnightly by packhorse, a telephone line was connected over the track in 1910, and radio arrived in the 1930s. To sell their cattle, farmer needed to drive them 130 miles north to the nearest sale yards at Whataroa.

Des Nolan (b. 1920) recalled the process to getting cattle to market from Okuru over the Haast–Paringa track around World War II. By this time there were three huts on the track: Coppermine Creek, the Iron Hut, and the Blue River or Blowfly Hut. First the cattle were herded to a 50 acre holding paddock at Coppermine Creek, where they rested for several days. Then they were driven 20 miles over the Paringa Saddle in one day, past the Iron Hut to the Blue River. The following day took the cattle 11 miles to Paringa, where they stayed in a paddock to recover before a day-long journey to Jacobs River. The Nolans would drive up to 200 cattle at a time, needing at least half a dozen men to accompany the mob over the narrow, difficult track at the Paringa Saddle; each man would need to drive around 35 cattle over the worst sections of road. Over 100 years perhaps 50,000 cattle were taken over the cattle track in this way.

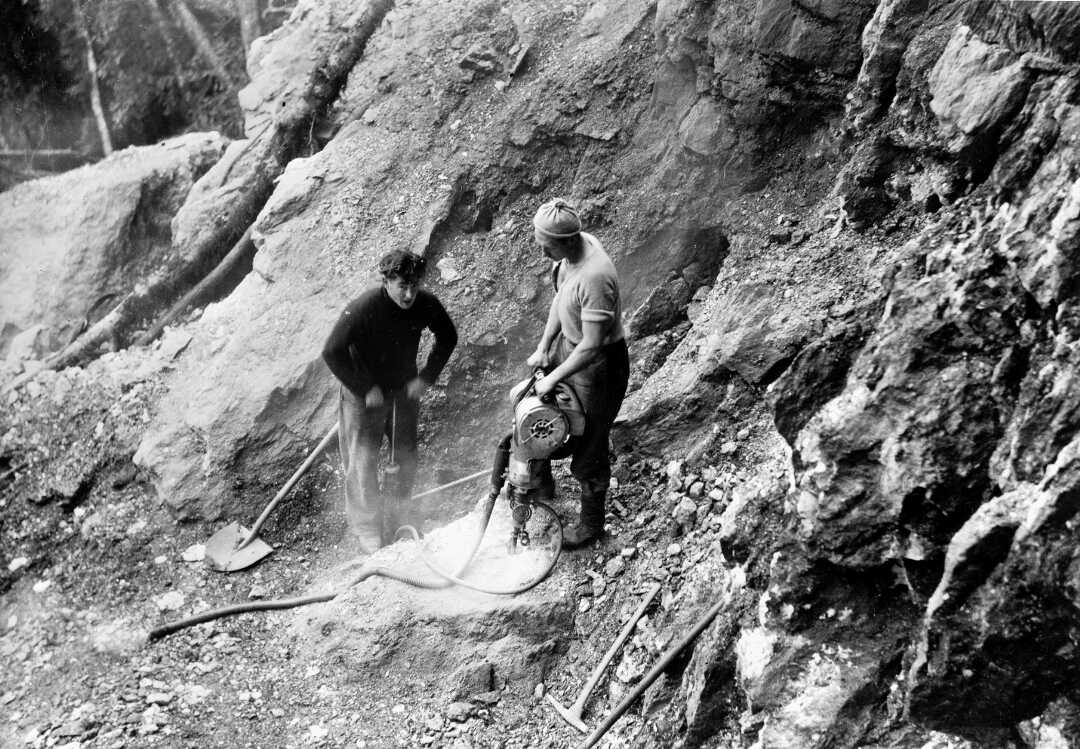
Mining for sheet mica c. 1944–1945

In 1942, a mica mine was developed in the Mataketake Range. Mica was a mineral used in radio condensers and spark-plug washers in Allied aircraft, and was deemed important for the war effort. Charlie Douglas had identified mica deposits in the area in his 1896 geological map, and a sample of sheet mica he collected was displayed at the 1906 Christchurch exhibition. The worldwide mica shortage spurred geologists Harold Wellman and Dick Willett to locate Douglas's mica deposit in 1941. A horse track was cleared up to the pegmatites near Mt Clarke, at an altitude of over 1000 m. In 1944 a more accessible deposit was found at an altitude of 500 m, south of Blowfly Hut; a bridge, road, and what is now known as the Old Mica Mine were built in the bush. Mica was mined until late 1945, but in the end the deposits proved too small and of poorer quality than those overseas.

South Westland became less isolated when a regular air service run by Bert Mercer and Air Travel New Zealand began to Haast and Okuru in 1934. A wharf was finally built at Jackson Bay in 1938, and a road connecting the Bay to Haast. The Coppermine Creek hut was inhabited from 1948 to 1960 by the last roadman, Charlie Driscoll, and his wife. At that point apart from twice-yearly cattle drives the track was mostly used by hunters and trampers; Haast residents preferred to fly to Hokitika.

The road connecting Haast with Otago over the Haast Pass was opened on 12 November 1960, and it was then possible to use trucks to take cattle south to Cromwell; the last mob to be driven over the cattle track was in 1961. Charlie Driscoll had by this time relocated to Big Bay. In 1965 the road north to the glaciers and Hokitika was finished, and there was now a continuous highway loop, bypassing the cattle track, which fell into disrepair.

In 2012 a large slip on near Knights Point raised the possibility of road access to the Haast Pass being eventually cut off. In the 2023 election campaign, independent candidate Patrick Phelps and National MP Maureen Pugh both raised the idea of rerouting State Highway 6 inland through the cattle track.

== Route ==
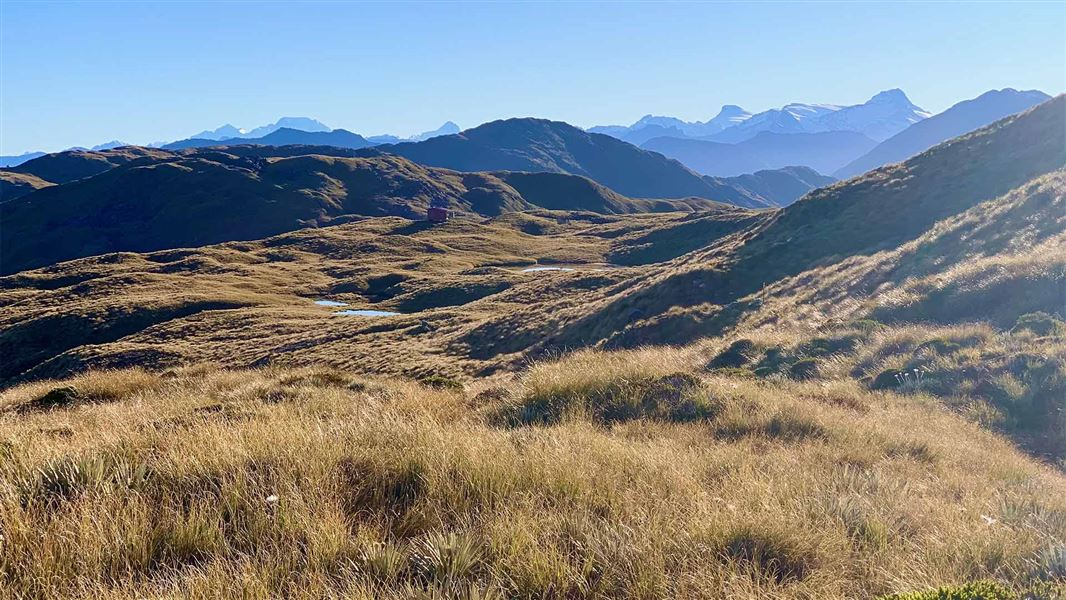
Māori Saddle Route looking towards Mataketake Hut

The track is 33 km, and these days is normally walked from north to south, taking 3–4 days. The northern trailhead begins at State Highway 6, on the low saddle between Windbag Creek and the Moeraki Valley. To avoid wetlands it deviates from the original route of the cattle track, which it joins after 15–20 minutes. The track travels through mixed southern beech/podocarp forest, following the Moeraki River, and crosses a swingbridge to reach Blowfly Hut, an hour and a half from the main road.

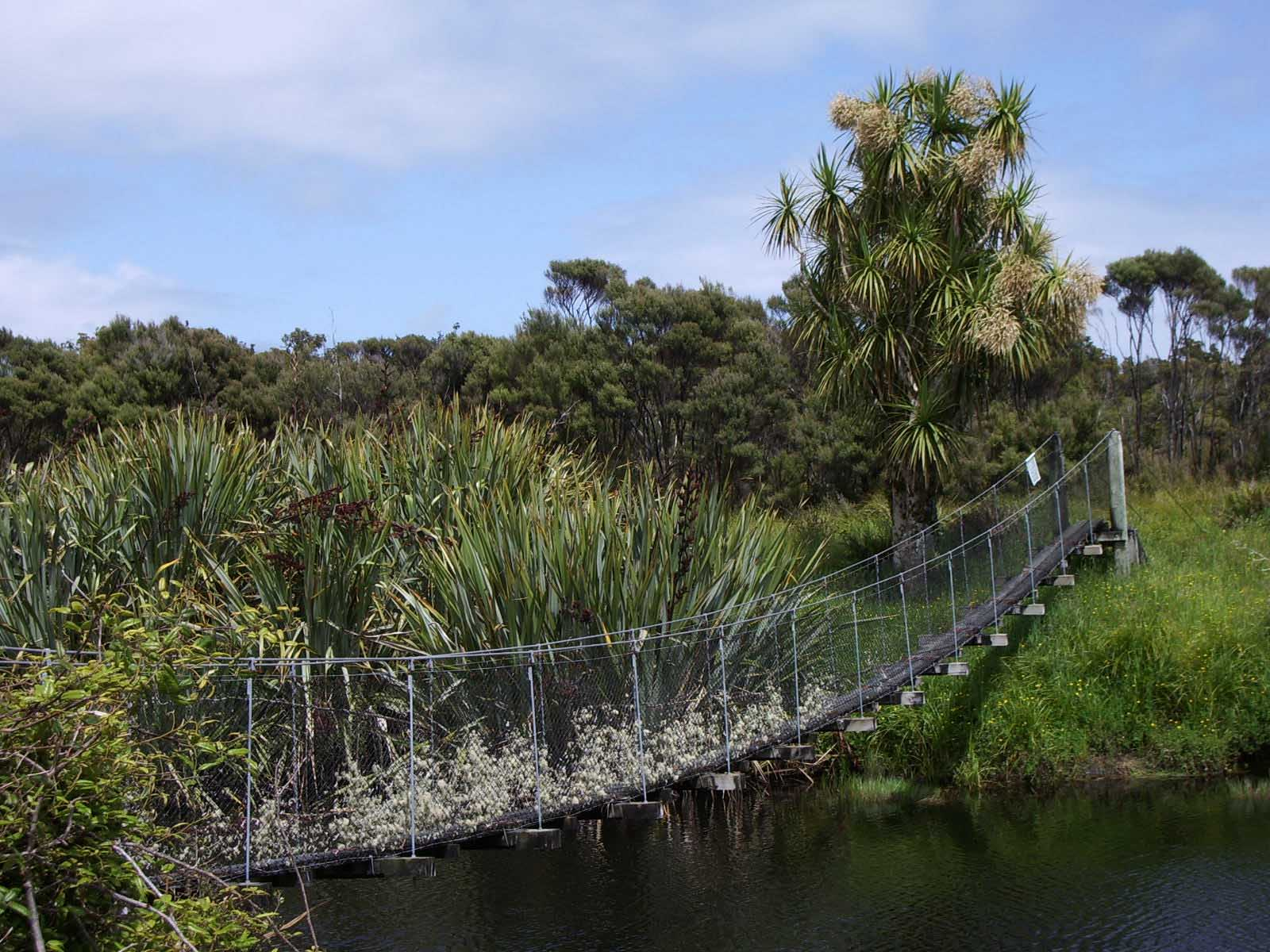
Crossing Coppermine Creek

The track from Blowfly Hut to Māori Saddle takes 4.5 hours, travelling southwest uphill through beech/kāmahi forest, following the western edge of the Mataketake Range. After two hours, there is the Mica Mine Track turnoff, a side track to the Wataketake tops reopened as a poled route in 2021. There are numerous stream crossings and some detours around slips which have covered the original track. Shortly after the Māori Saddle a side track leads to the Mateketake Tops, enabling a return loop via the Mataketake Hut and the Mica Mine Track, creating a 2–3 day circuit.

The longest stretch of the track is downhill, and takes 7 to 9 hours to reach Coppermine Creek Hut. Markers indicate the routes around fallen trees and slips; the track crosses the Alpine Fault and the area is very prone to erosion from heavy rain. On reaching the flats, the track turns north and crosses Coppermine Creek to reach the hut.

From Coppermine Creek a two-hour walk on flat ground leads to the southern terminus of the track, beside the State Highway 6 bridge over the Waita River, 11 km north of Haast.

== Huts ==
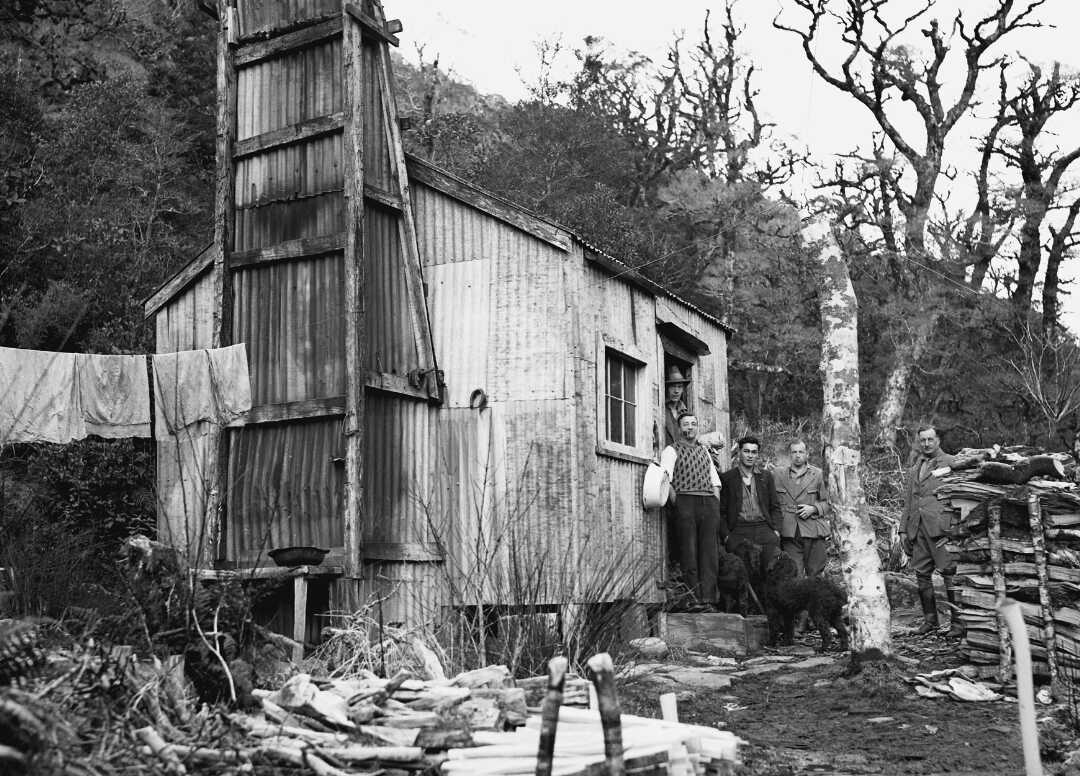
The Iron Hut, around 1920

The cattle track was very subject to slips, and needed constant maintenance by roadmen, who were housed in huts in the forest. After the track was essentially completed in 1883, three huts were built out of corrugated iron: at the Waita River entrance, Blue Hut at the Moeraki (Blue) River, and Iron Hut in between about an hour from Coppermine Creek.

These corrugated iron boxes were servicable but not lavish accommodation. W.D. Nolan describes the Iron Hut as "convenient" if "nothing flash". Travel writer A. Maud Moreland stayed in the Blue River hut around 1909, and was plagued by mosquitoes:

It was nothing but a corrugated-iron box, eight or nine feet square, with a rude bunk, covered with fern, at either side; between them was a dirty cupboard smeared with candle grease, which served as a table; a stool by the wide hearth and two old billies completed the furniture. An axe-head lay near, but the handle had been burnt for fire-wood, and the floor was littered with dirty paper, old tins, sticks, and ferns. A more truly uninviting place would be hard to find.

In the 1940s or 1950s, around the time the bridge was built to the mica mine, new huts were built: Coppermine Creek at the cattle paddocks, and Blowfly Hut (8 bunks), either a rebuild or replacement of the old Blue River Hut. Blowfly Hut probably took its name from the flies generated by cattle manure; a surviving sign identifies it as "Jack Farrell's Hut". The Iron Hut fell into disrepair in the 1950s, and the Waita Hut, renamed the Drovers Rest, was pulled down in 2006 and replaced by a whitebaiter's crib.

Although there were once 200–300 roadmen's huts in New Zealand, only three survive: Blowfly Hut, Jacks Hut in Arthur's Pass, and the hut at Castle Hill Station (restored in 2003).

Current huts on the Haast–Paringa Track

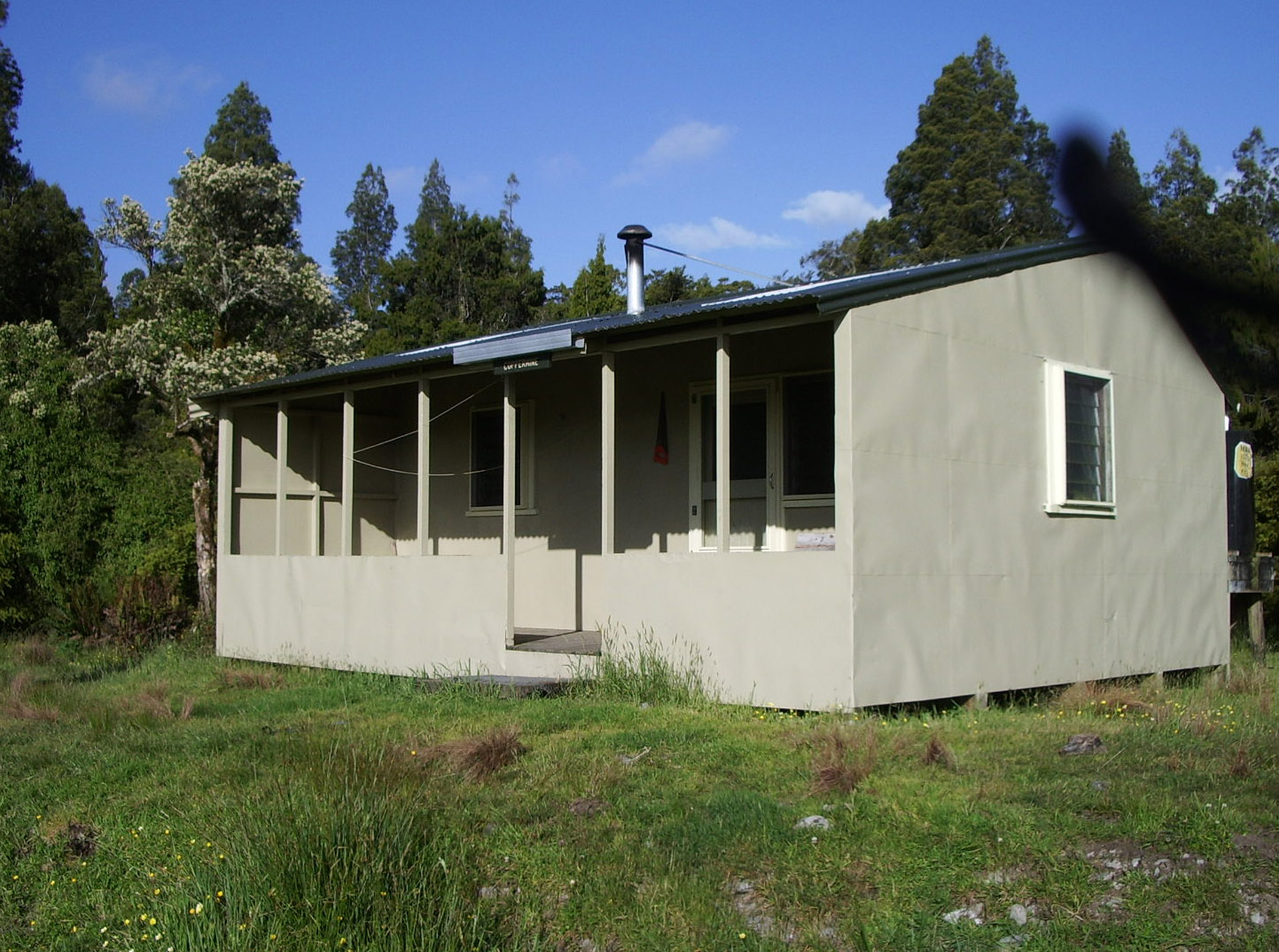
Coppermine Creek Hut

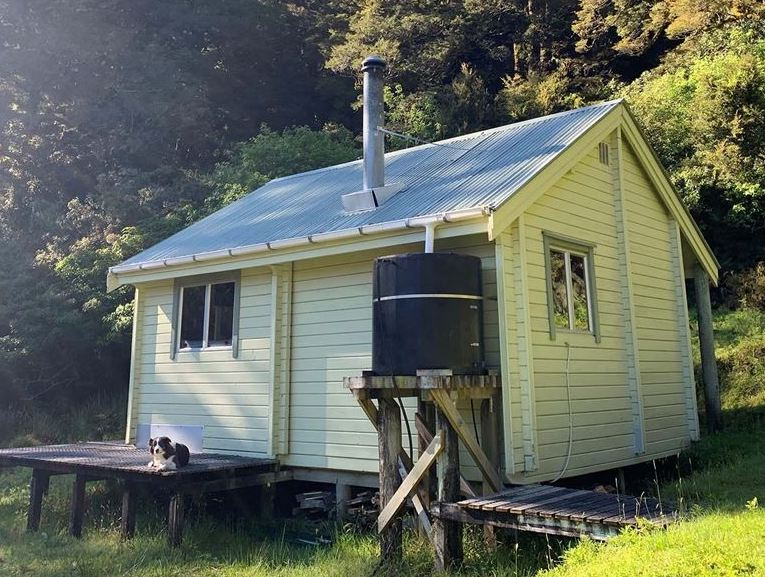
Māori Saddle Hut

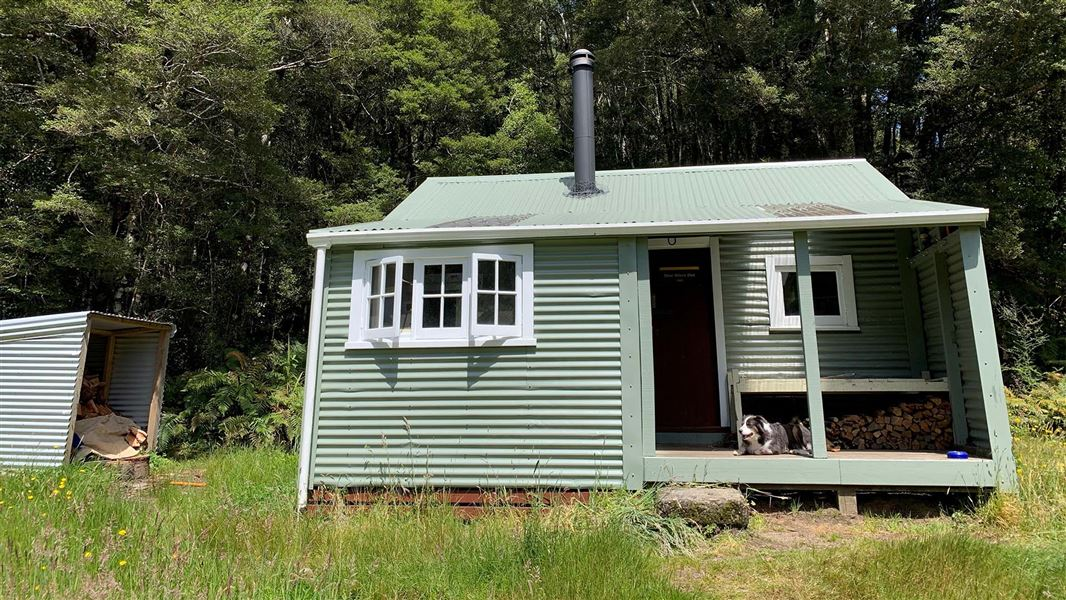
Blowfly Hut

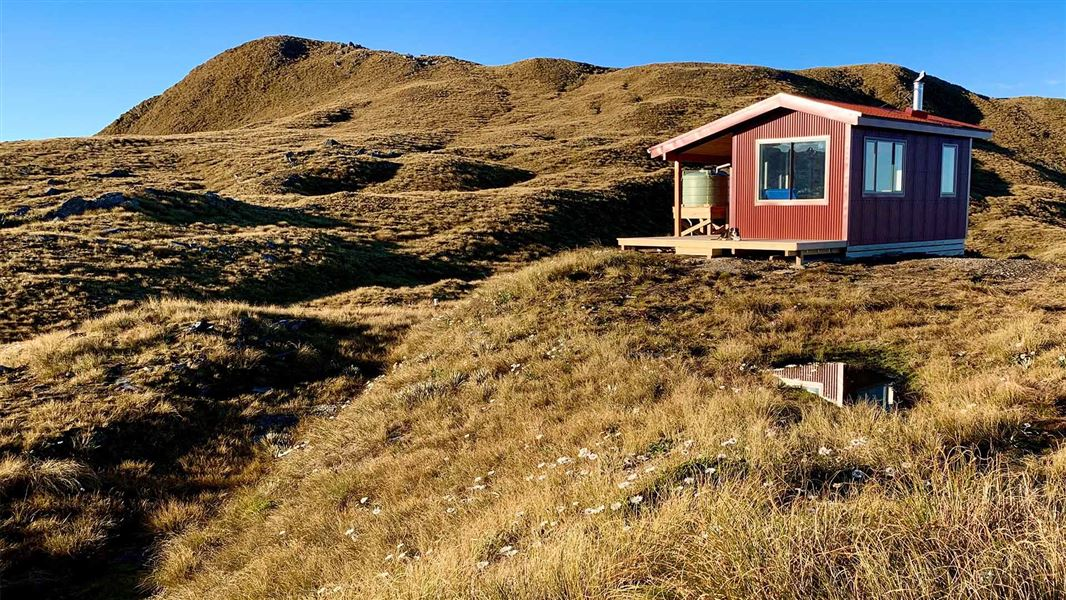
Mataketake Hut

Māori Saddle Hut (10 bunks) and a new hut at Coppermine Creek (6 bunks) were built in 1980 by the New Zealand Forest Service, when the Haast–Paringa track was upgraded for trampers. An eight-bunk hut was built on the Mataketake tops in 2021, dedicated to the memory of conservationist Andy Dennis.

== See also ==
- New Zealand tramping tracks
- Tramping in New Zealand
