= Gorge River =

River in New Zealand

- Route of the Gorge River
- Mouth of the Gorge River Gorge River (South Island) Gorge River (New Zealand)

Location
- Country: New Zealand
- Region: West Coast Region
- District: Westland

Physical characteristics
- Source
  - location: Hope Blue River Range
  - coordinates: 44.1587°S 168.3933°E
- Mouth
  - location: Tasman Sea
  - coordinates: 44°11′00″S 168°11′43″E

Basin features
- Progression: Gorge River → Tasman Sea
- Tributaries
  - left: Duncan River, Murray Creek, Rocky Creek, Gorge Creek, Plateau Creek, Jerry River, Bagpipe Creek, Branchions Creek, Adam Creek, Jacob Creek, Malcolm Creek
  - right: Blackwater Creek, Dans Creek

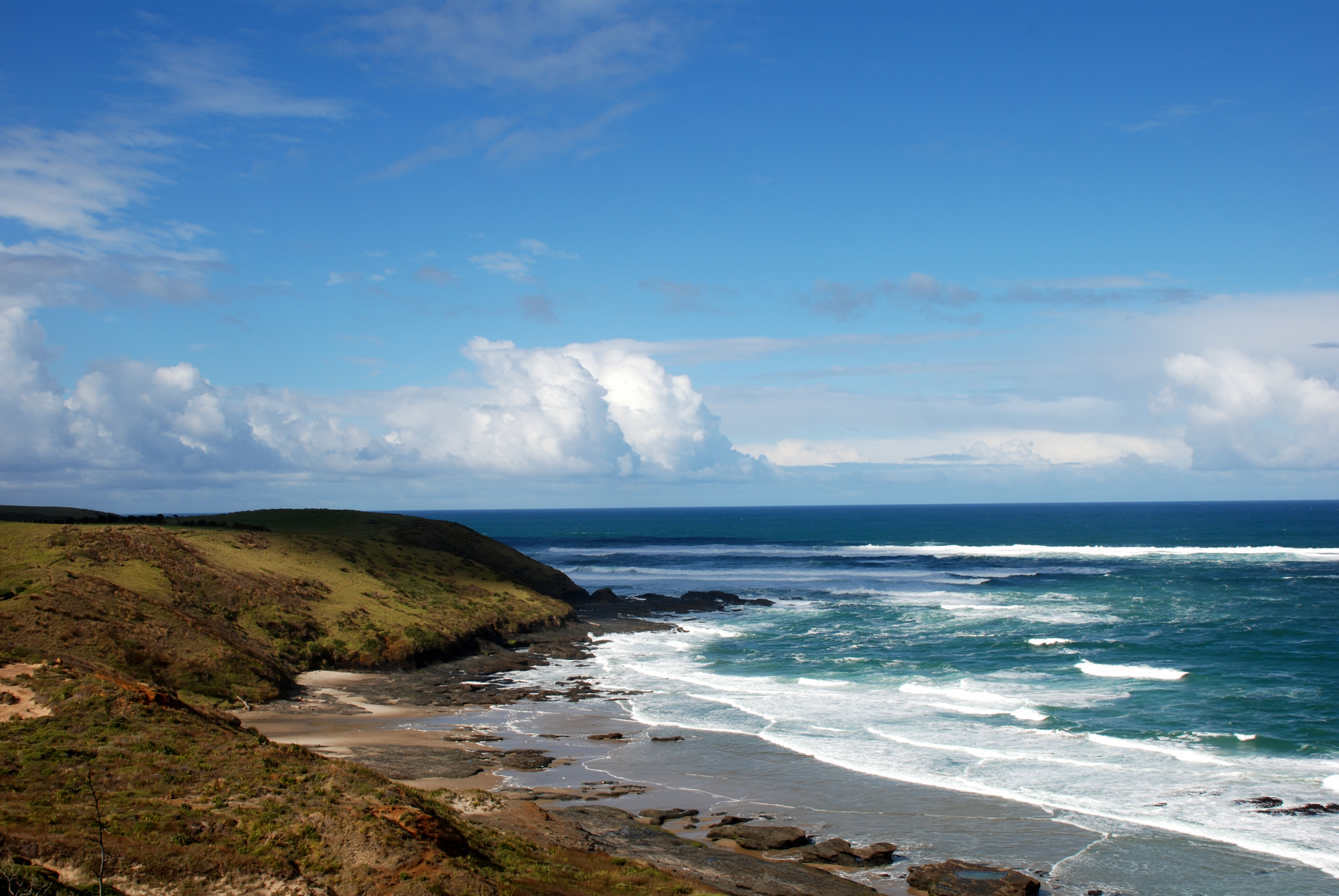
View of the Tasman sea from Hokianga.

The Gorge River is a river on the West Coast of New Zealand's South Island. It arises in the Hope Blue River Range and flows south-west into the Tasman Sea. Its tributaries include the Duncan River and Jerry River. It passes through Cascade Forest. Its mouth is about 15 kilometres (9 miles) north-east of Awarua Point. The Gorge Islands are very small islands near the mouth. At its mouth, it is a fast tidal river.

At the mouth of the river is the home of the Long family, known as "New Zealand's most remote family". It is a two-day walk to the nearest civilisation in Haast. Robert Long began living there in 1980.

== See also ==
- List of rivers of New Zealand
