= Jerry River =

River in New Zealand

- Route of Jerry River
- Mouth of Jerry River Jerry River (South Island) Jerry River (New Zealand)

Location
- Country: New Zealand
- Region: West Coast Region
- District: Westland

Physical characteristics
- Source
  - coordinates: 44.2739°S 168.3499°E
- Mouth
  - location: Gorge River
  - coordinates: 44°11′54″S 168°15′19″E
- Length: 16 kilometres (9.9 mi)

Basin features
- Progression: Jerry River → Gorge River → Tasman Sea
- Tributaries
  - left: Saddle Creek
  - right: Low Creek

The Jerry River is a river of the southwestern South Island of New Zealand. It flows northwest into the Gorge River, which flows into the Tasman Sea between Jackson Bay and Big Bay.

== See also ==
- List of rivers of New Zealand
