= Awarua River =

Awarua River may refer to:

- Awarua River (Northland), New Zealand
- Awarua River (Southland), New Zealand
- Dry Awarua River, New Zealand
