= Cascade River (New Zealand) =

River in New Zealand

- Route of the Cascade River
- Mouth of the Cascade River Cascade River (New Zealand) (New Zealand)
- Native name: Tahutahi (Māori)

Location
- Country: New Zealand
- Region: West Coast Region
- District: Westland

Physical characteristics
- Source: Confluence of Limbo Stream and Retreat Creek
  - coordinates: 44.0434°S 169.2193°E
- Mouth
  - location: Haast River
  - coordinates: 44°01′32″S 169°21′43″E
  - elevation: 0 m (0 ft)
- Length: 67 kilometres (42 mi)

Basin features
- Progression: Cascade River → Tasman Sea
- Tributaries
  - left: Barrington Creek, Granite Creek, Saddle Creek, Kappa Creek, Delta Creek, Gamma Creek, Beta Creek, Colin Creek, Eel Creek, Barn River
  - right: Holland Creek, Malcolm Creek, Arcade Creek, Captains Creek, Falls Creek, McKay Creek, Woodhen Creek, Martyr River, The Old Man

The Cascade River (Māori: Tahutahi) is a river of the South Island of New Zealand. It flows north for 30 kilometres (19 mi) from its source in Mount Aspiring National Park in the Southern Alps, forming a deep valley between the Olivine Range and Red Hills Range. From the end of this valley it turns west to cross a low-lying swampy floodplain before entering the Tasman Sea close to Cascade Point, a headland halfway between Big Bay and Jackson Bay.

== See also ==
- List of rivers of New Zealand
