= Duncan River (New Zealand) =

River in New Zealand

- Route of the Duncan River
- Mouth of the Duncan River Duncan River (New Zealand) (South Island) Duncan River (New Zealand) (New Zealand)

Location
- Country: New Zealand
- Region: West Coast Region
- District: Westland

Physical characteristics
- Source
  - location: Red Hills Range
  - coordinates: 44.2561°S 168.225°E
- Mouth
  - location: Gorge River
  - coordinates: 44°14′42″S 168°05′51″E

Basin features
- Progression: Duncan River → Gorge River → Tasman Sea

The Duncan River is a river in the West Coast Region of New Zealand. It arises in the Red Hills Range and flows north-east to the Gorge River, which flows west into the Tasman Sea.

== See also ==
- List of rivers of New Zealand
