= Martyr River =

River in New Zealand

Coordinates: 44°06′S 168°31′E

Location
- Country: New Zealand

Physical characteristics
- Source
  - location: Olivine Range
- Mouth
  - location: Cascade River
- Length: 20 km (12 mi)

The Martyr River is a river of the West Coast Region of New Zealand's South Island. It flows generally northwest from its sources in the Olivine Range, joining its stream with the braided paths of the Cascade River 10 kilometres from the coast. New Zealand's Alpine Fault, the boundary between the Australian and Pacific tectonic plates, is exposed in the banks of the Martyr River.

== See also ==
- List of rivers of New Zealand
