= Lake Paringa =

Lake in New Zealand

- Tāwhiriraupō
- Tāwhiriraupō (Māori)
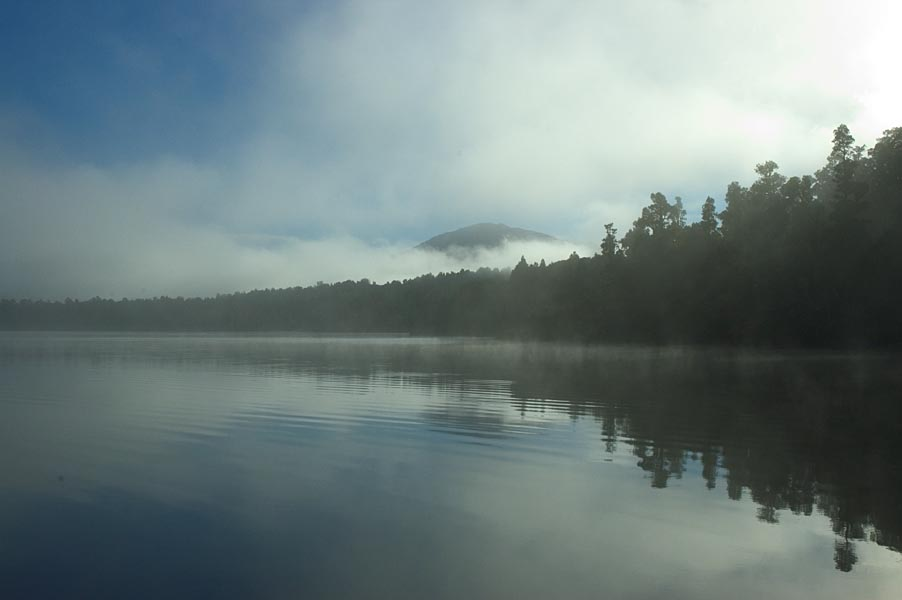
- Lake Paringa in the morning mist

- Location within New Zealand
- Interactive map of Lake Paringa
- Location: Westland District, West Coast Region, South Island
- Coordinates: 43°43′S 169°24′E
- Primary inflows: The Windbag, Collie Creek, Hambone Creek, Jamie Creek, Waihuka Stream, Tui Stream
- Primary outflows: Hall River
- Basin countries: New Zealand
- Surface elevation: 16 metres (52 ft)

Lake Paringa (Māori: Tāwhiriraupō) is a small lake 50 kilometres north of Haast on the West Coast of New Zealand's South Island.

The Hall River drains its waters from the Lake Paringa. The Hall River flows to east and meets the Paringa River.
