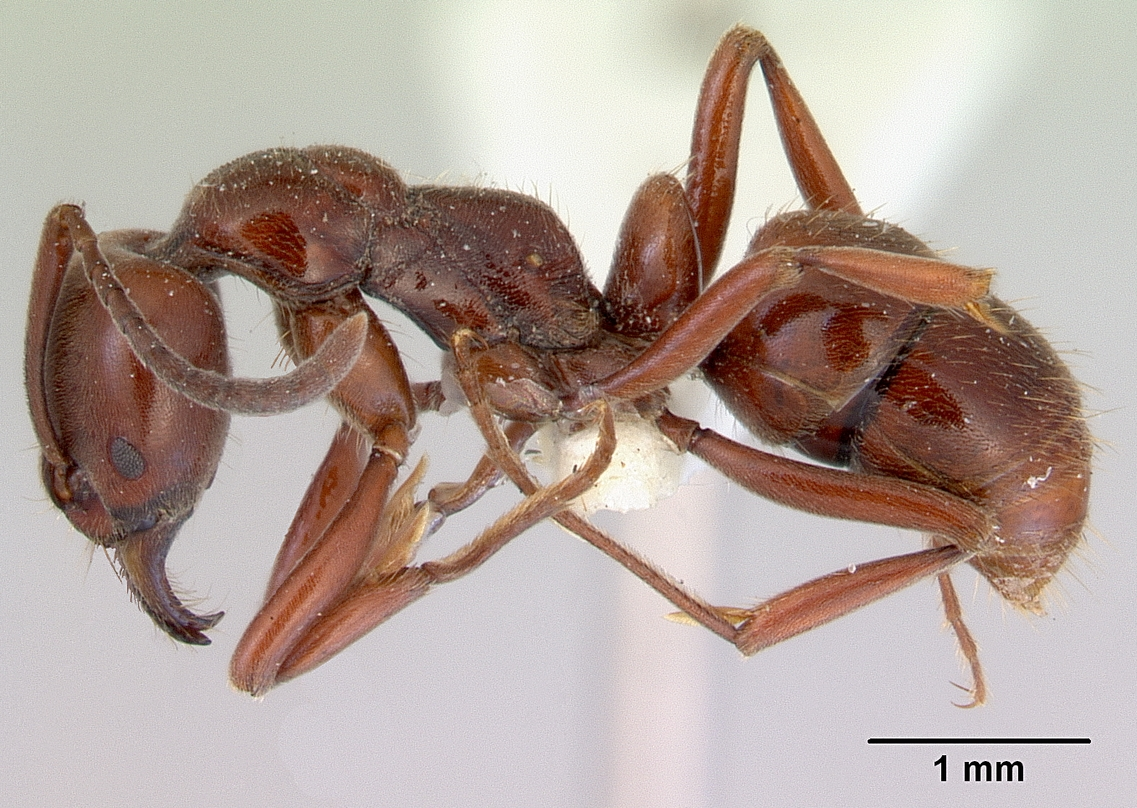
- Austroponera castaneicolor worker

Scientific classification
- Kingdom: Animalia
- Phylum: Arthropoda
- Class: Insecta
- Order: Hymenoptera
- Family: Formicidae
- Genus: Austroponera
- Species: A. castaneicolor

Binomial name
- Austroponera castaneicolor (Dalla Torre, 1893)

= Austroponera castaneicolor =

Species of ant

Austroponera castaneicolor is an ant species of the subfamily Ponerinae, endemic to the North Island, and the north and north west of the South Island, of New Zealand.

== Description ==
The worker ants are typically 5.5 - 6.4mm (10 Workers). Their heads have a width of 1.12 - 1.30mm (10 Workers) with their sides (as seen from the photo provided) slightly and evenly convex. Their eyes are levelled with their antennae. Their mandibles are long with 10 teeth. The colour of their head, body and legs is uniformly yellowish and orange-brown.

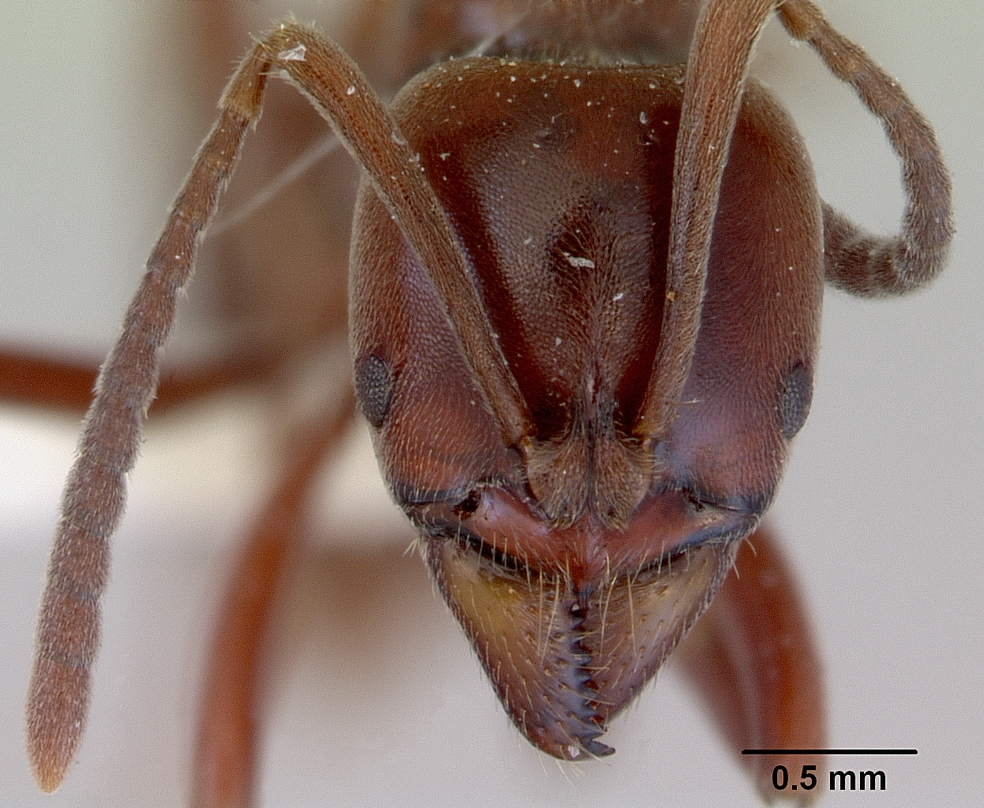
Front view

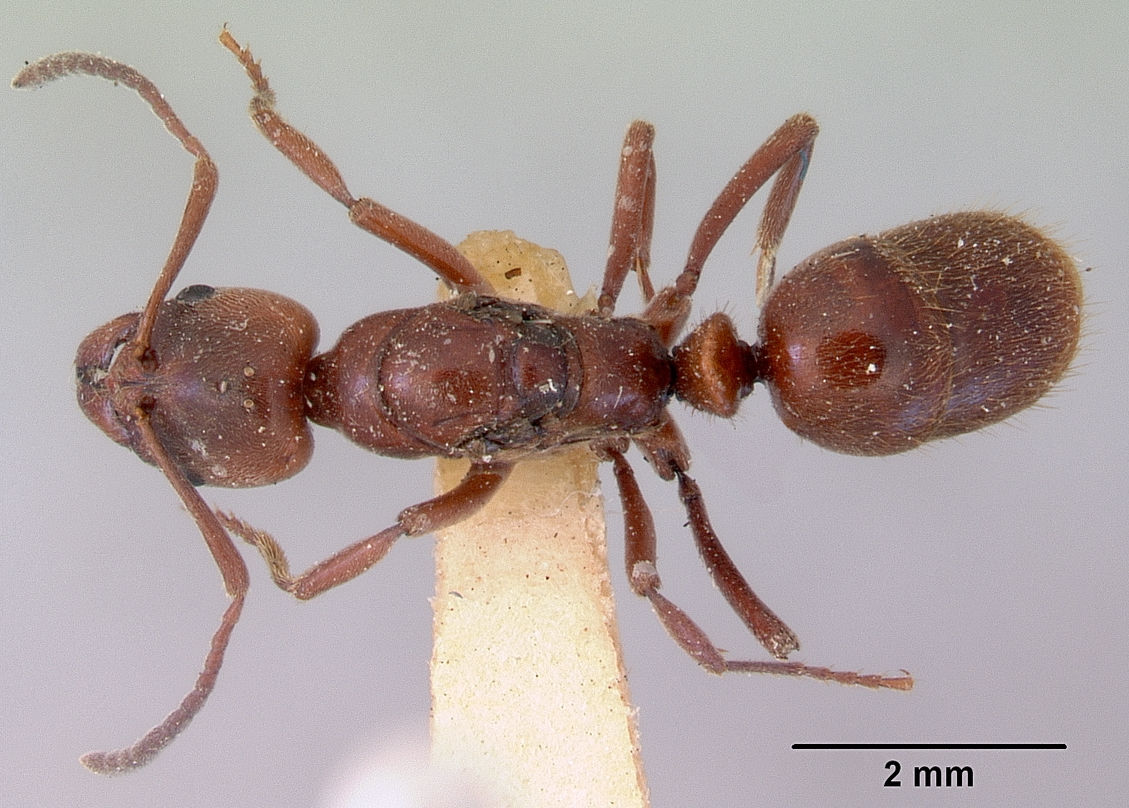
Top view

== Distribution ==
The species are typically found in the North and South Island of New Zealand they are more prevalent in the North Island as they are affected by the cold found in the lower South Island: Nelson province, Marlborough. The southernmost known record is a small sample of workers collected near the shore of Lake Moeraki. On March 29, 1964, workers were collected at Bullock Creek.
