= Hall River (New Zealand) =

River in New Zealand

Coordinates: 43°41′47″S 169°26′02″E

Location
- Country: New Zealand

Physical characteristics
- Source
  - location: Lake Paringa
- Mouth
  - location: Paringa River

The Hall River is a river on the West Coast of New Zealand. It drains Lake Paringa, flowing north to the Paringa River, which drains into the Tasman Sea.

== See also ==
- List of rivers of New Zealand
