= Barn River =

River in New Zealand

- Route of the Barn River
- Mouth of the Barn River Barn River (South Island)

Location
- Country: New Zealand
- region: West Coast Region
- District: Westland District

Physical characteristics
- Source: Hermitage Swamp
- Mouth: Cascade River
  - coordinates: 44°2′58″S 168°23′27″E
  - elevation: < 10 m (33 ft)
- Length: 6.8 kilometres (4.2 mi)

Basin features
- Progression: Hermitage Swamp → Barn River → Cascade River
- River system: Cascade River

The Barn River is a small river in a remote area of the Westland district of New Zealand. Only 6 kilometres (4 mi) long, it acts as the primary drainage of the south half of the Hermitage Swamp near the mouth of the Cascade River.

== See also ==
- List of rivers of New Zealand
