= Awarua Bay =

Awarua Bay may refer to:

- Awarua Bay, part of Bluff Harbour, New Zealand
- Big Bay (Southland), Fiordland, New Zealand
