= Maori River =

River in New Zealand

Coordinates: 43.799337°S 169.117504°E

Location
- Country: New Zealand

Physical characteristics
- Source
  - location: Mataketake Range
- Mouth
  - location: Waita River
- Length: 15 km (9.3 mi)

The Maori River is a river of the West Coast Region of New Zealand's South Island. It flows from several sources in the Mataketake Range east of Haast, passing through the small Tawharekiri Lakes before becoming a tributary of the Waita River, which flows into the Tasman Sea 15 kilometres north of Haast.

== See also ==
- List of rivers of New Zealand
