= Hall River =

Hall River may refer to one of the following waterways:

== Canada ==
- Hall River (Bonaventure River), a tributary of the Bonaventure River in Gaspésie-Îles-de-la-Madeleine, Quebec
  - Hall River West, a tributary of the Hall River

== New Zealand ==
- Hall River (New Zealand)

== United States ==
- Hall River (Florida), Citrus County, Florida

== See also ==
- Halls Stream, a tributary of the Connecticut River, forming part of boundary between Quebec (Canada) and New Hampshire (United States)
- Hell River, a 1974 Yugoslav film
