= Lake Moeraki =

Lake in New Zealand

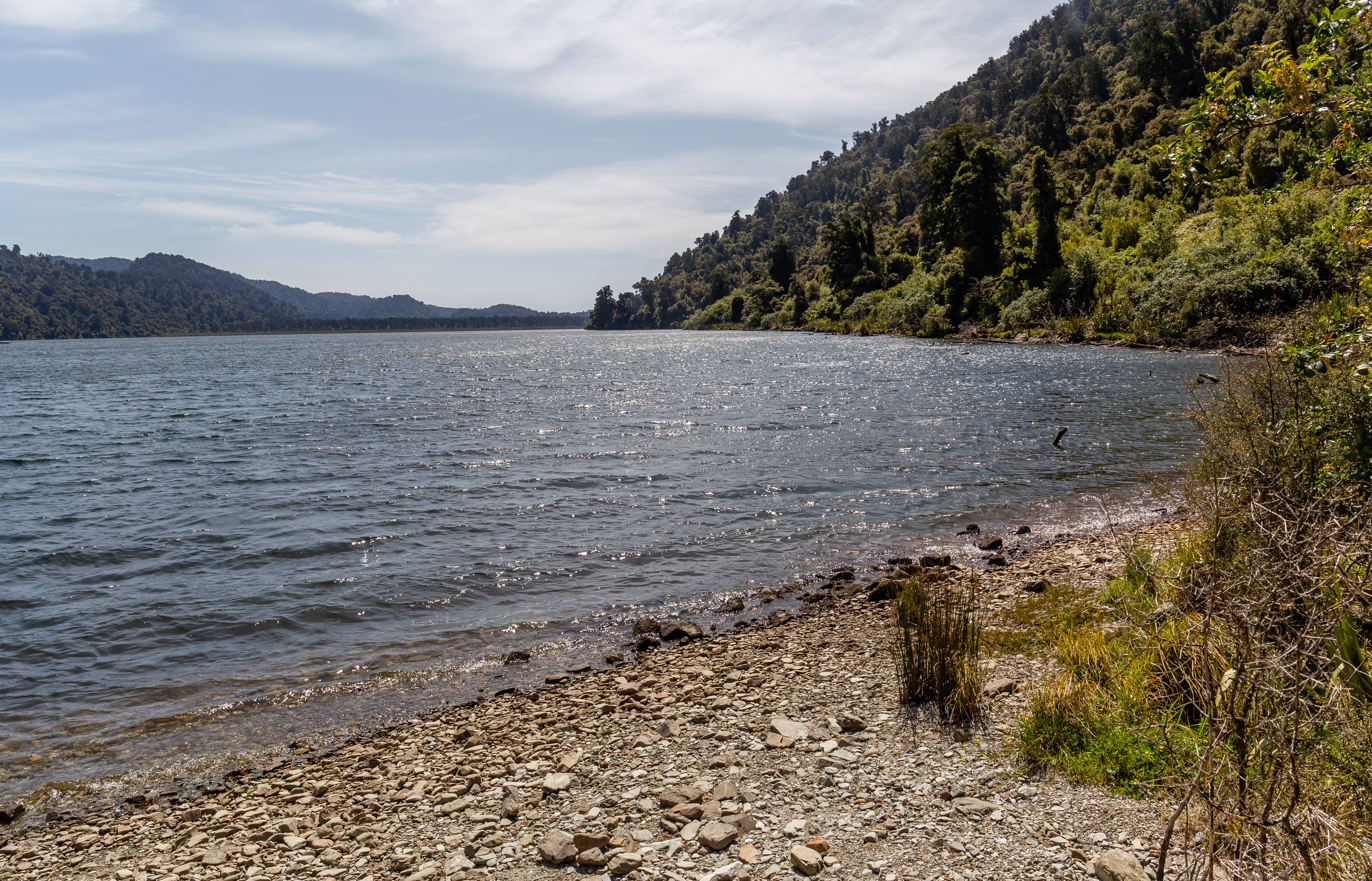
- Lake Moeraki

- The location of Lake Moeraki in New Zealand
- Interactive map of Lake Moeraki
- Location: West Coast, South Island, New Zealand
- Coordinates: 43°44′S 169°17′E

Lake Moeraki is a small lake on the Moeraki River on the West Coast of the South Island of New Zealand. State Highway 6 runs along its northern edge.

The lake is surrounded by native vegetation and lies within the Te Wahipounamu World Heritage site.

Tours to watch Fiordland crested penguins are popular attractions for tourists. Since 1989, a bull southern elephant seal, named "Humphrey" returns annually. This species is rather rare on New Zealand coasts. Another individual sometimes migrate here as well. Occasionally, other pinnipeds such as New Zealand fur seals and sea lions visit around. Hector's dolphins may possibly swim along the shores.

== See also ==
- Lakes of New Zealand
