= Awarua River (Southland) =

- Route of the Awarua River
- Mouth of the Awarua River Awarua River (Southland) (South Island) Awarua River (Southland) (New Zealand)

Location
- Country: New Zealand
- Region: Southland
- District: Southland

Physical characteristics
- Source: Waiuna Lagoon
  - coordinates: 44°18′54″S 168°08′32″E
  - elevation: 15 metres (49 ft)
- Mouth
  - location: Big Bay
  - coordinates: 44°17′35″S 168°07′15″E
  - elevation: 0 metres (0 ft)
- Length: 8.34 kilometres (5.18 mi)

Basin features
- Progression: Awarua River → Big Bay → Tasman Sea

The Awarua River is a short river that flows from the Waiuna Lagoon into Big Bay, also known as Awarua Bay, an embayment at the northern end of Fiordland in New Zealand. The river's mouth is at the northern end of Three Mile Beach, the Big Bay beach. One of the rivers that feeds Waiuna Lagoon is the Dry Awarua River.

The mouth of the Awarua River is near the western boundary between the West Coast Regional Council area and the Southland Regional Council areas. It was formerly the boundary between Canterbury Province and Otago Province from when they were created in 1853.
