= Waita River =

River in New Zealand

Coordinates: 43°47′S 169°07′E

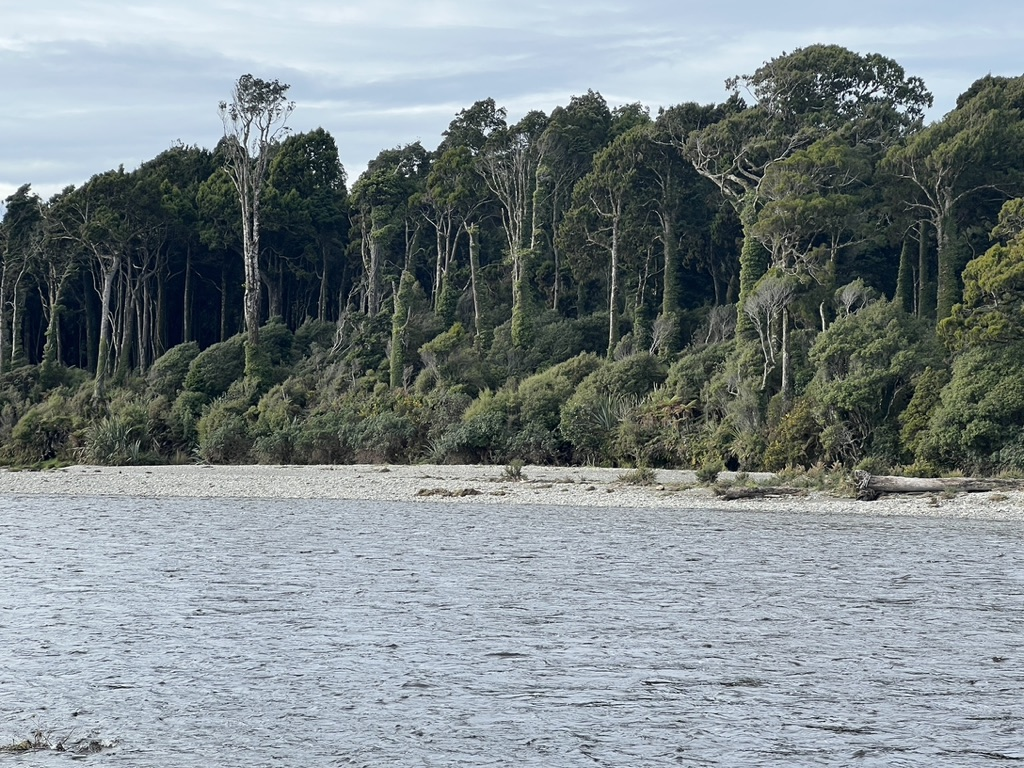

Location
- Country: New Zealand

Physical characteristics
- Source
  - location: Mataketake Range
- Mouth
  - location: Tasman Sea
- Length: 17 km (11 mi)

The Waita River is in the West Coast Region of New Zealand's South Island. It flows generally west to reach the Tasman Sea 10 kilometres northeast of the mouth of the Haast River. The river has its source on the western flanks of the Mataketake Range and passes through dense native forest which opens up into farm land before passing under the State Highway 6. The Maori River is one of the tributaries of the Waita.

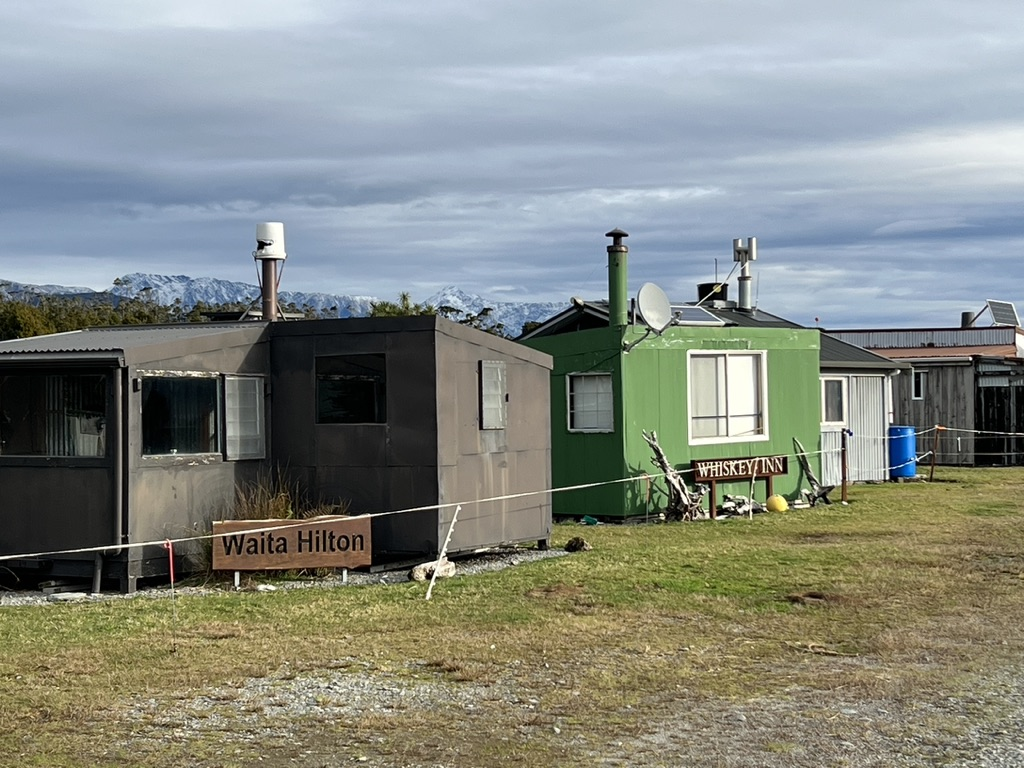
Baches at the mouth of the Waita River

There are a number of baches next to the river after the point where it is crossed by the State Highway. About seven permanent residents live in them, some of which date back to the 1900s and have historic value. The Department of Conservation, which administers the land on which the baches lie, wanted to have the baches removed by 2025 as part of a draft Conservation Management Strategy (CMS). This was on the basis of a policy to avoid private accommodation on public land. The final version of the CMS allowed the baches to stay, but they must be made available to the public where possible.

The settlement at Waita River is also home to a commercial whitebait business. It began in 1970 as a whitebait buying and packing business in a collection of caravans, and added a house and warehouse with packing operation and walk-in freezers, and now sells wholesale whitebait and serves whitebait patties to tourists.

== See also ==
- List of rivers of New Zealand
