= Waiuna Lagoon =

Lake in New Zealand

- Interactive map of Waiuna Lagoon
- Location: Big Bay, Southland, South Island
- Coordinates: 44.304°S 168.138°E
- Primary inflows: Dry Awarua River
- Primary outflows: Awarua River
- Basin countries: New Zealand
- Surface elevation: 15 m (49 ft)

Waiuna Lagoon is a lake in the Southland Region of New Zealand's South Island, just inland from Big Bay. It is 15 metres above sea level, and is drained by the Awarua River.
