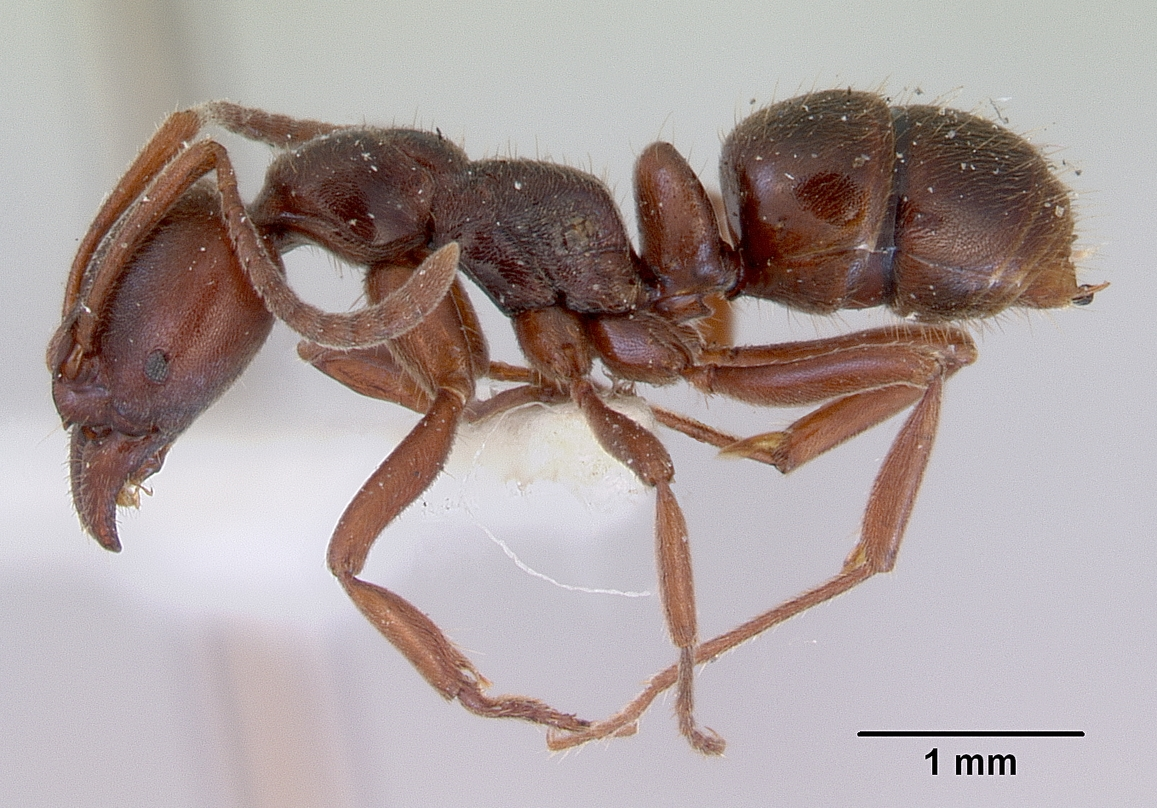
- Austroponera castanea worker

Scientific classification
- Domain: Eukaryota
- Kingdom: Animalia
- Phylum: Arthropoda
- Class: Insecta
- Order: Hymenoptera
- Family: Formicidae
- Genus: Austroponera
- Species: A. castanea

Binomial name
- Austroponera castanea (Mayr, 1865)

= Austroponera castanea =

Species of ant

Austroponera castanea is an ant species in the subfamily Ponerinae. It is endemic to New Zealand.
