= Water pollution in the West Coast Region =

Overview of the water pollution in the West Coast, New Zealand

The West Coast region of New Zealand.

Water pollution is an environmental issue on the West Coast of New Zealand. Water resources and water pollution come under the jurisdiction of the Resource Management Act and is controlled by the regional councils - for the West Coast it is the West Coast Regional Council.

A 2008 State of the Environment report reported that:

- acid mine drainage has significant effects on freshwater ecosystems
- less than 5% of the water samples taken from contact recreation sites indicated unsafe swimming conditions. 17 sites are monitored along a length of 600 km of coastline that drains hundreds of rivers. For the upper 150 km, north of Westport, there is no monitoring
- point source pollution has decreased and nonpoint source pollution has increased
- Water deterioration occurs at the lower levels of a number of catchments
- Water quality improvements were evident in a number of water quality indicators.

== Issues ==
=== Grey River ===
Raw sewage is discharged into the Grey River after heavy rainfall. Historically, sewage and stormwater from Greymouth, Cobden and Blaketown was discharged directly to the Grey River. Changes to the Grey District Council's wastewater schemes provide separation and treatment for sewage, except during periods of high rainfall, such as spring, when the capacity of the sewage treatment is exceeded.

=== Acid mine drainage ===
The West Coast has a long history of mining and some of the waterways suffer from acid mine drainage as a result of the leaching of acidic water from mining activity.

=== Drinking water ===
Eighty two percent of the population is supplied by reticulated drinking water with 28% having some form of treatment to improve water quality. None of the water supplies reach drinking water standards.

=== Lake Brunner ===
The water on Lake Brunner has been monitored since the 1990s and its quality has remained relatively high, although there are concerns about the effects of significant pasture drainage from local dairy farms.

=== Ngākawau River ===
North of Westport Water from the Stockton open cast coal mine pollutes the Ngākawau River.

=== Mokihinui River ===
50 km north of Westport.

This river has a 68,000ha catchment, which is largely pristine and within the conservation estate upstream of the coastal region. There are two small settlements in the low reaches and two large farms, one at the river mouth, the other in Seddonville, behind the coastal range. The Seddonville farm is a large industrial dairy farm that in 2004 was still discharging all dairy effluent into the river. It took a concerted effort on the part of local environmentalists to get the regional council to insist on the farm installing effluent ponds. These ponds then largely discharged into the river via a drain for many years, and were washed out during floods until a particular complaint in 2016 got the regional council to insist on an upgrade, and a shift to above the floodline.

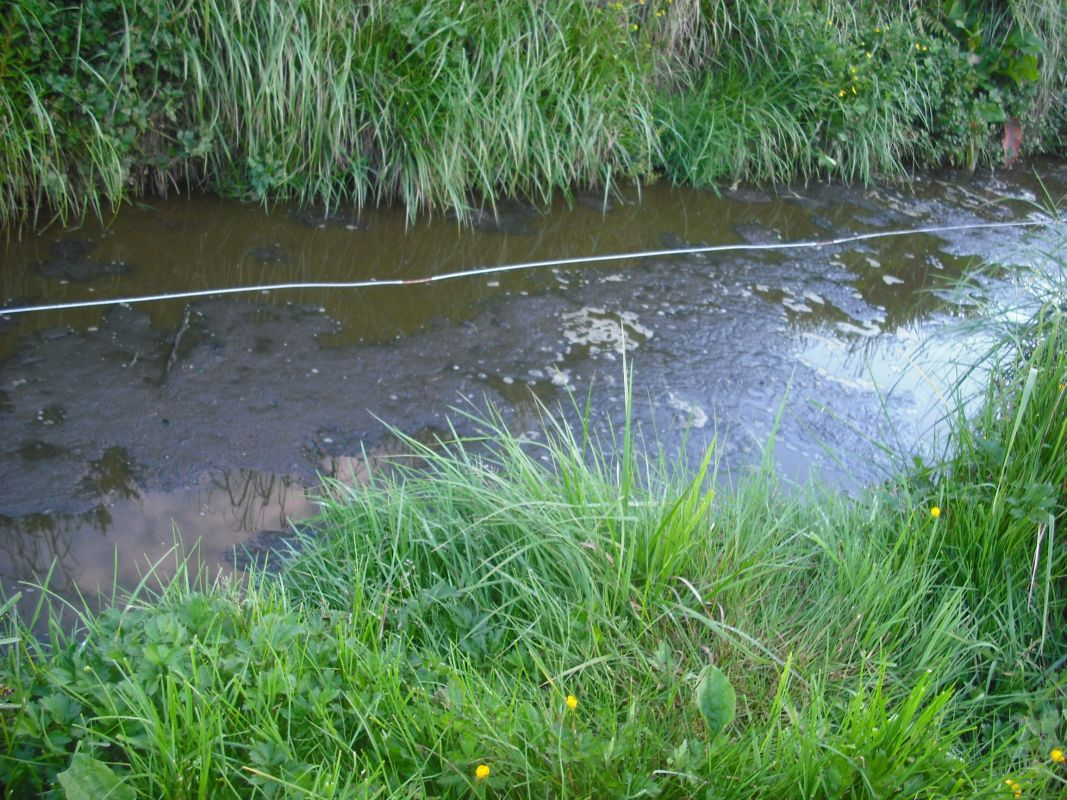
A ditch connecting the dairy effluent pond to Coal Creek

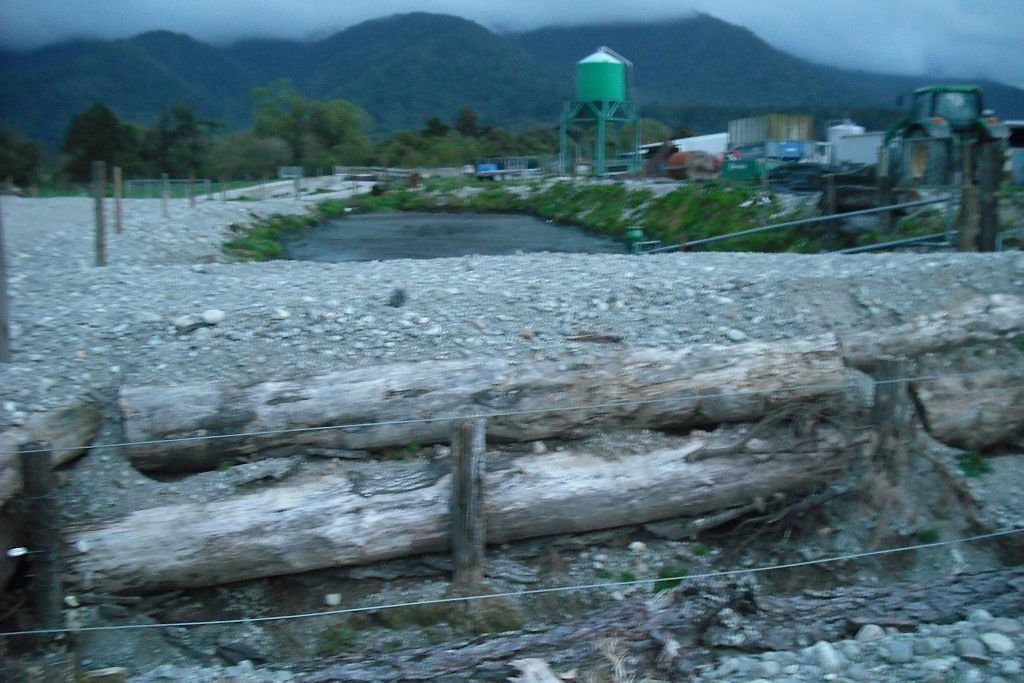
shows the upgraded and moved dairy effluent pond

In September 2017 milk was discovered being discharged into the river via that same drain. Erroneous reporting in the local paper protected the farmer; it is not clear whether the erroneous reporting was the police, the regional council or reporter. Evidence points to the dairy company refusing the milk due to unacceptable penicillin levels. There does not appear to be any contingencies provided on the West Coast for milk rejected by Westland Milk Products.

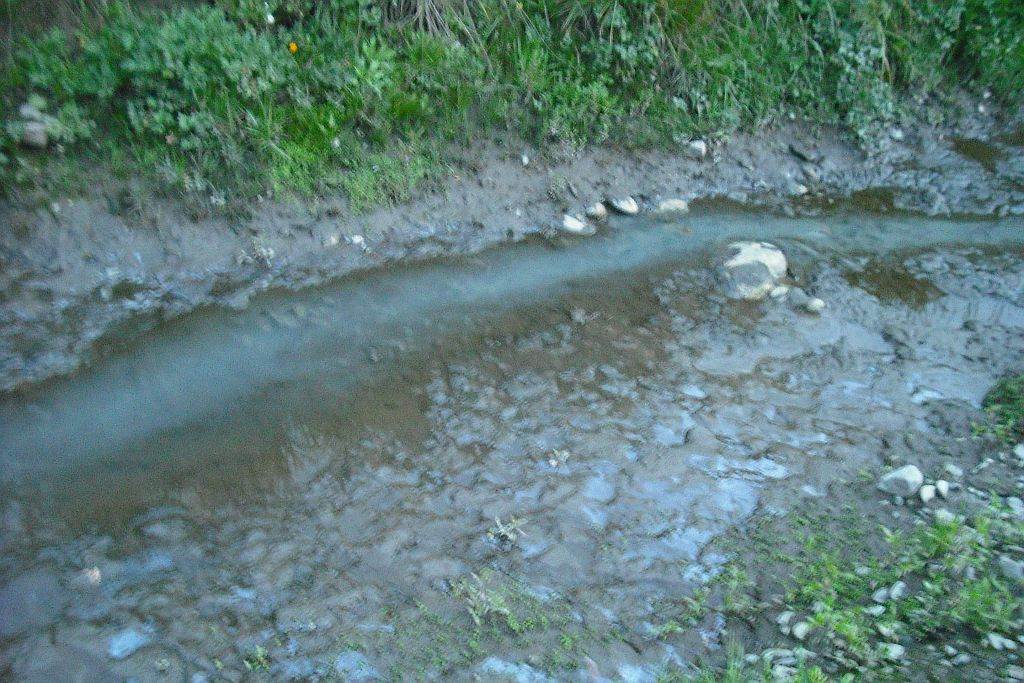
milk being discharged from dairy shed into nearest creek

== See also ==
- Water pollution in New Zealand
- Environment of New Zealand
