= Moeraki River =

River in New Zealand

Coordinates: 43°42′S 169°15′E

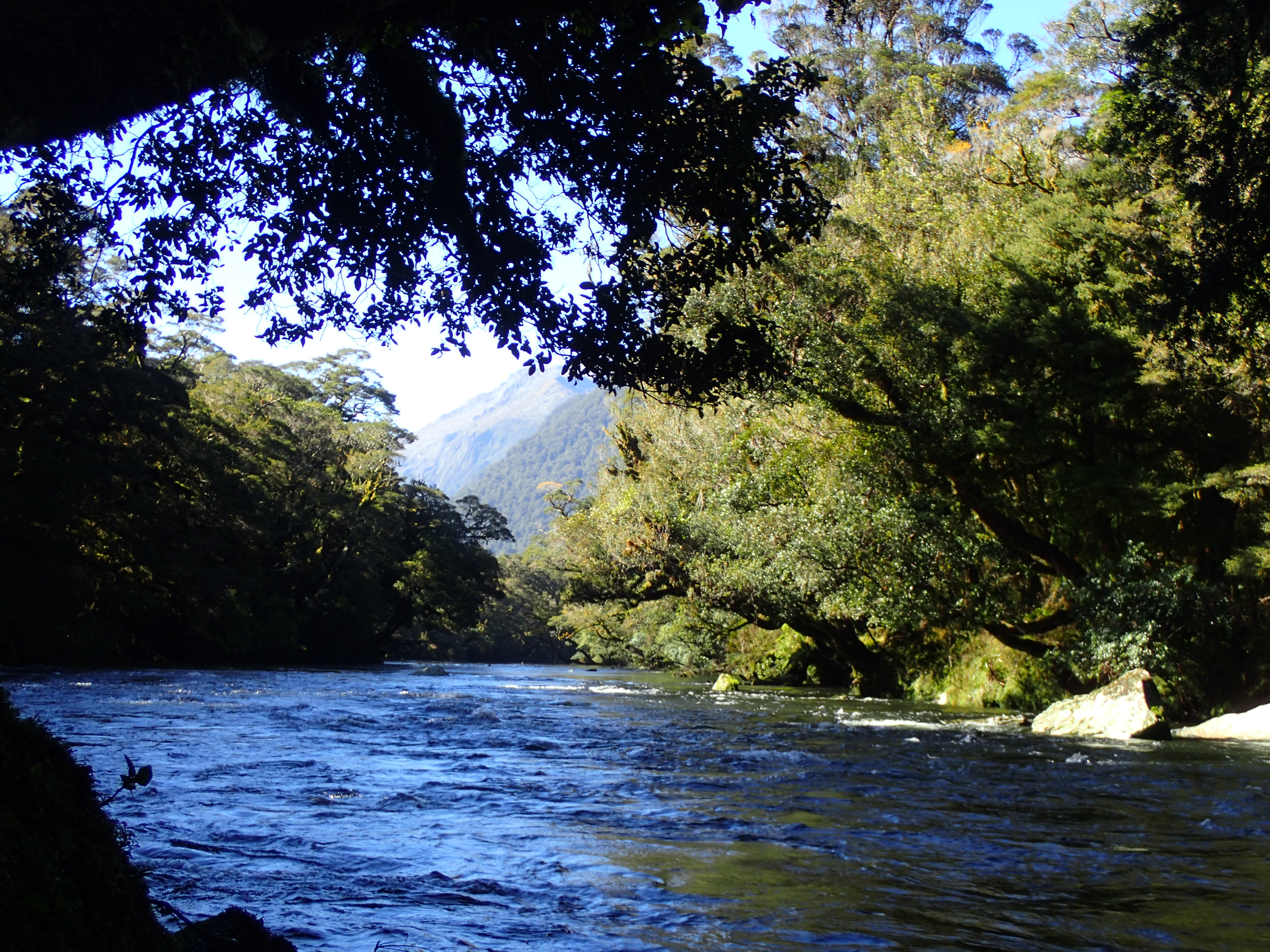
- The Moeraki just south of State Highway 6

Location
- Country: New Zealand

Physical characteristics
- Source
  - location: Southern Alps
- Mouth
  - location: Tasman Sea
- Length: 25 km (16 mi)

The Moeraki River is a river of the West Coast Region of New Zealand's South Island. It flows west from the Southern Alps, veering northwest as it approaches the coast. It flows into the eastern end of the small Lake Moeraki before flowing out the western end to reach the Tasman Sea 20 kilometres northeast of Haast.

== See also ==
- List of rivers of New Zealand
