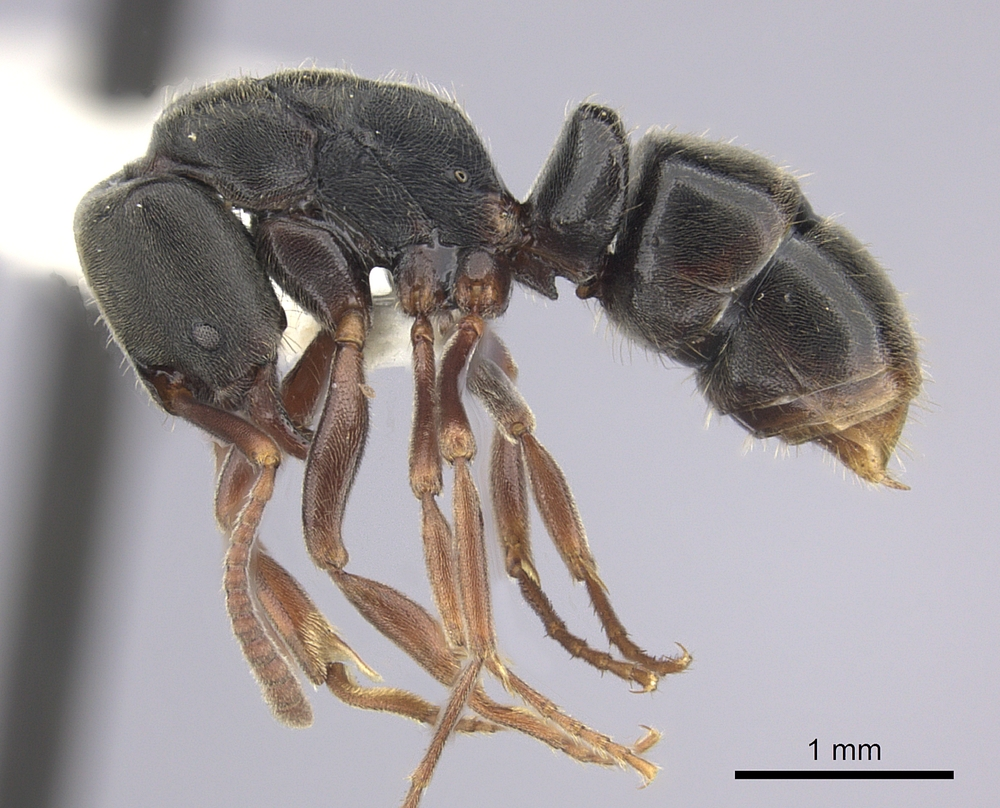
- Austroponera rufonigra

Scientific classification
- Kingdom: Animalia
- Phylum: Arthropoda
- Clade: Pancrustacea
- Class: Insecta
- Order: Hymenoptera
- Family: Formicidae
- Subfamily: Ponerinae
- Tribe: Ponerini
- Alliance: Ponera genus group
- Genus: Austroponera; Schmidt & Shattuck, 2014

Type species
- Euponera rufonigra Clark, 1934

Diversity
- 5 species

= Austroponera =

Austroponera Temporal range: Early Miocene–present, 23.03–0 Ma

Genus of ants

Austroponera is a ponerine genus of ants found in Australia and New Zealand, hence the prefix "Austro-".

== Species ==
As of 2026, Austroponera contains five valid species, including four extant and one extinct.

=== Extant ===
- Austroponera castanea (Mayr, 1865)
- Austroponera castaneicolor (Dalla Torre, 1893)
- Austroponera pachynoda (Clark, 1930)
- Austroponera rufonigra (Clark, 1934)

=== Extinct ===
- †Austroponera schneideri Kaulfuss & Dlussky, 2016

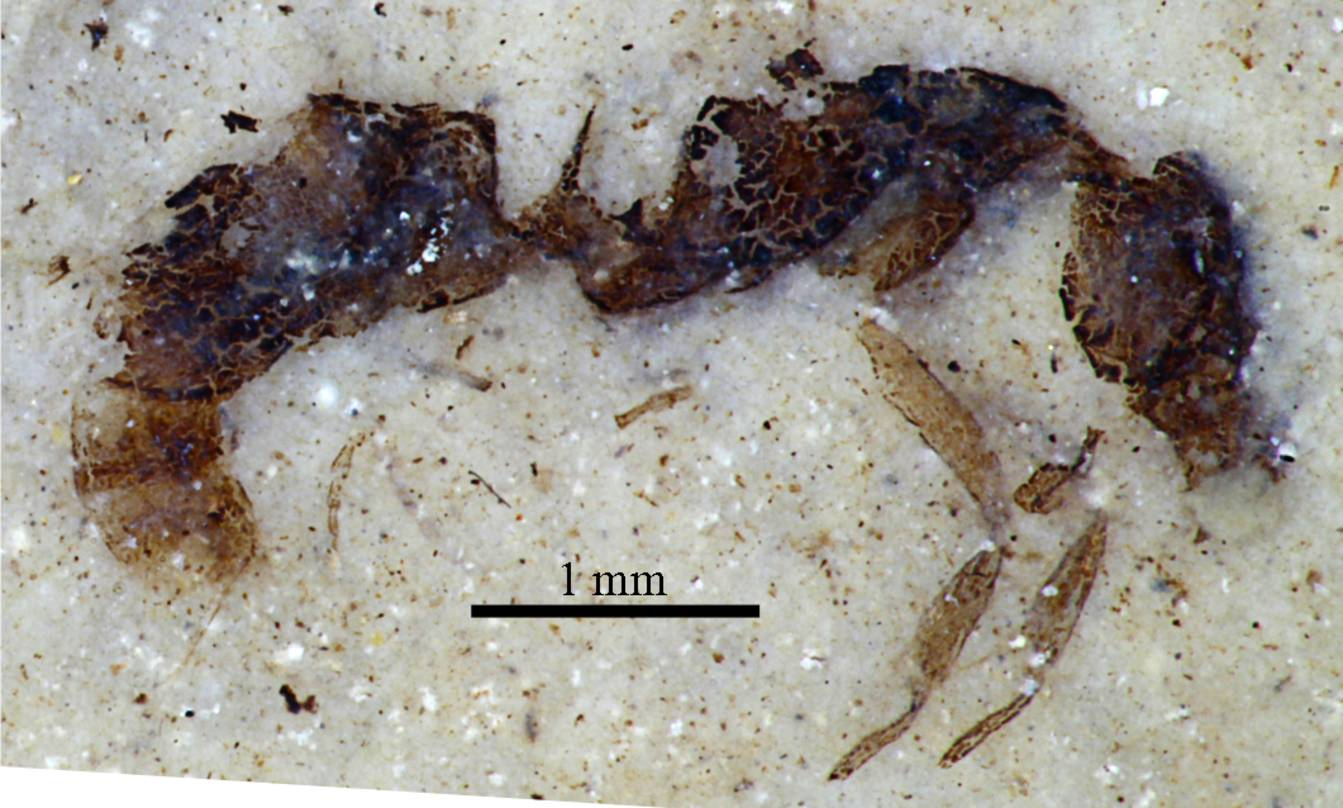
Holotype of Austroponera schneideri from the Foulden Maar
