= Dry Awarua River =

- Route of the Dry Awarua River
- Mouth of the Dry Awarua River Dry Awarua River (South Island) Dry Awarua River (New Zealand)

Location
- Country: New Zealand
- Region: Southland
- District: Southland

Physical characteristics
- Source: McKenzie Range
  - coordinates: 44°15′44″S 168°13′20″E
- Mouth
  - location: Waiuna Lagoon
  - coordinates: 44°18′14″S 168°08′37″E
  - elevation: 15 metres (49 ft)
- Length: 10.7 kilometres (6.6 mi)

Basin features
- Progression: Dry Awarua River → Waiuna Lagoon → Awarua River → Big Bay → Tasman Sea

The Dry Awarua River is a river of northern Fiordland, New Zealand. It rises in the McKenzie Range and flows south and then westward into the Waiuna Lagoon. The Lagoon then discharges into the Awarua River, which flows into Big Bay, also known as Awarua Bay. The Pyke - Big Bay tramping track crosses the Dry Awarua River.

== See also ==
- List of rivers of New Zealand
