= Awarua Point =

- Point
- Location within New Zealand
- Coordinates: 44.2607°S 168.0536°E
- Location: Westland District, New Zealand
- Water bodies: Tasman Sea, Big Bay
- Etymology: From Māori awa - river, and rua - two
- Defining authority: New Zealand Geographic Board

Dimensions
  - Length: 4 kilometres (2.5 mi)
  - Width: 2 kilometres (1.2 mi)

Awarua Point is located on the southwestern coast of New Zealand's South Island, at the northern end of Big Bay, 40 kilometres (25 mi) north of Milford Sound / Piopiotahi, and 15 kilometres (9.3 mi) north of the mouth of the Hollyford River / Whakatipu Kā Tuka.

Traditionally, Awarua Point is regarded as the end of Fiordland and the start of the West Coast region, although the boundary of Fiordland National Park is located 10 kilometres (6.2 mi) further south at the northern end of Martins Bay.

The New Zealand Ministry for Culture and Heritage gives a translation of "two streams" for Awarua.

== See also ==
- Awarua Plains
