= Dick Willett =

New Zealand geologist (1912–1974)

Richard Wright Willett (31 October 1912 – 1974) was a New Zealand geologist. He rose to be Director of the New Zealand Geological Survey from 1956 to 1967, where his major work was the instigation of a 1:250,000 scale national geological map known as the 'Four Mile project'.

As a student at University of Otago he became active in the New Zealand Labour Party during the 1935 election.

Sir Ernest Marsden lobbied for Willet to become the first 'Commonwealth geological liaison officer' which involved Willet and his family moving to London for the period 1951–1954.

In 1958, Willet and two others published a detailed geological description on New Zealand's only uranium-rush, that of Hawks Crag in the Buller Gorge.

In 1965, Willett was awarded an honorary DSc from the University of Otago.

Willett was President of the Royal Society of New Zealand 1970–1974, preceded by John Miles and followed by Sir Malcolm McRae Burns.

== Selected works ==
- A glacial valley, Mount Aurum, Skippers' Creek Survey District. Richard Wright Willett. Wellington : Govt. Printer, 1939.
- Elliotvale Coal-mine H. W. Wellman and Richard Wright Willett, Government Printer, New Zealand, 1944
- Coal at Coal Creek, Centre Hill, Survey District, Southland. New Zealand Department of Scientific and Industrial Research. Wellington, N.Z. : Govt. Printer, 1945.
- The Limestone Resources of Southland, New Zealand. Richard Wright Willett, New Zealand Department of Scientific and Industrial Research, 1950
- Uranium mineralization in the Hawks Crag Breccia of the Lower Buller Gorge Region, South Island, New Zealand. A. C. Beck, J. J. Reed & R. W. Willett. Journal of Geology and Geophysics, 1:3, 432–450, 1958 DOI: 10.1080/00288306.1958.10422773
- Report from the Royal Society of New Zealand Earthquake Risk Subcommittee. Richard Wright Willett. 1962
