= Big Bay (New Zealand) =

Bay in New Zealand

- Te Hokiauau
- Location Big Bay (South Island) Big Bay (New Zealand)
- Location: Fiordland, Southland District, New Zealand
- Coordinates: 44.2988°S 168.0672°E
- River sources: Awarua River, McKenzie Creek

Big Bay, also known as Awarua Bay, is a deep indentation in the southwestern coast of New Zealand's South Island, 40 kilometres north of Milford Sound and immediately to the north of Martins Bay. The bay is eight kilometres in width, and extends eight kilometres into the South Island, making an almost square indentation in the island's coastline. Its northern end is Awarua Point. Immediately beyond Long Reef, the rocky point at the southern end, is the mouth of the Hollyford River and Martins Bay. Big Bay has a sandy beach named Three Mile Beach. The Awarua River enters the bay at the northern end of the beach.

The mouth of the Awarua River is the western end of the boundary between the West Coast Regional Council area and the Southland Regional Council area. It was formerly the boundary between Canterbury Province and Otago Province from when they were created in 1853. Three Mile Beach, the Awarua River and Waiuna Lagoon are within the boundary of Southland region. Awarua Point is within the boundary of the West Coast region. The Dry Awarua River runs from the West Coast region into Waiuna Lagoon in the Southland region.
