= Paringa River =

Coordinates: 43°38′S 169°26′E

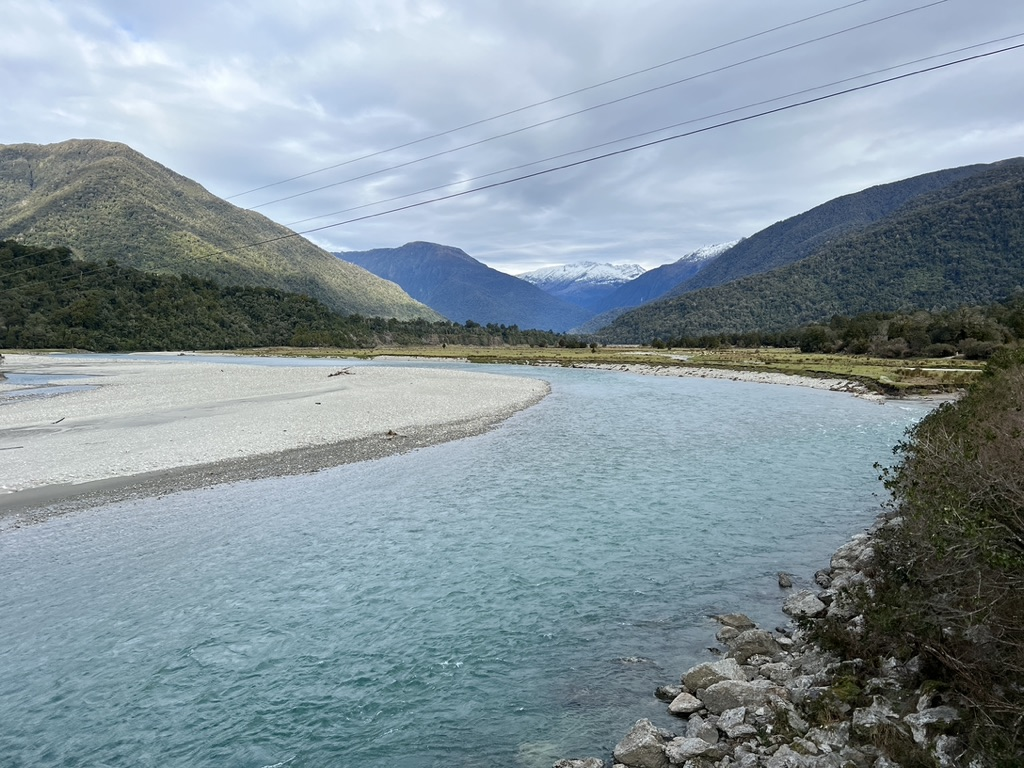

Location
- Country: New Zealand

Physical characteristics
- Mouth
  - location: Tasman Sea
- Length: 37 km (23 mi)

The Paringa River is a river of the West Coast Region of New Zealand's South Island. It flows generally northwest from its origins in the Southern Alps west of Mount McCullaugh, reaching the Tasman Sea 10 km (6.2 mi) southwest of Bruce Bay. Geologist Jeremy Kilner wrote his 2005 bachelor's with honours thesis at the University of Otago about this valley; the title of his thesis was: Geophysical survey of the Paringa River valley, South Westland.

== See also ==
- List of rivers of New Zealand
