= West Coast Region =

Region of New Zealand

West Coast Te Tai Poutini
- Region
- West Coast Region in New Zealand
- Coordinates: 42.6°S 171.4°E
- Country: New Zealand
- Island: South Island
- Seat: Greymouth
- Constituent territorial authorities: List: Buller District; Grey District; Westland District

Government
  - Type: Regional council
  - Body: West Coast Regional Council
  - Chair: Colin Smith
  - Deputy chair: Mark McIntyre

Area
  - Land: 23,245.52 km^{2} (8,975.15 sq mi)

Population (June 2025)
  - Total: 34,700
  - Density: 1.49/km^{2} (3.87/sq mi)

GDP
  - Total: NZ$ 2.101 billion (2021) (15th)
  - Per capita: NZ$ 64,063 (2021)
- HDI (2023): 0.918 very high · 12th
- Website: westcoast.co.nz

The West Coast (Māori: Te Tai Poutini, lit. 'The Coast of Poutini, the Taniwha') is a region of New Zealand on the west coast of the South Island. It is administered by the West Coast Regional Council, and is known co-officially as Te Tai Poutini. It comprises the territorial authorities of Buller District, Grey District and Westland District. The principal towns are Westport, Greymouth and Hokitika. The region, one of the more remote areas of the country, is also the most sparsely populated. With a population of just 32,900 people, the West Coast is the least populous region in New Zealand. The population in the region grew by 0.4% over the year to July 2023.

The region has a rich and important history. The land itself is ancient, stretching back to the Carboniferous period; this is evident by the amount of carboniferous materials naturally found there, especially coal. First settled by Kāi Tahu in approximately 1350 AD, the area was famous across New Zealand for its richness in pounamu greenstone. Kāi Tahu traded millions of modern New Zealand dollars' worth of the stone across New Zealand, making Te Tai Poutini one of the wealthiest regions in the country.

After the arrival of Europeans, the region became famed for its vast and mostly untapped gold reserves, which historically had not been highly valued. The region was subsequently settled by thousands of Irish Catholics after the Irish Famine, who constitute the majority of the population, alongside the indigenous Kāi Tahu and those who come from admixing between the two populations. The West Coast is the only region of New Zealand where coal mining is still widely practiced.

== Naming ==
The name Westland is used by some New Zealanders to refer to the whole of the West Coast, including Grey District, Buller District and Fiordland, and can also refer to the short-lived Westland Province of 1873–76.

Fiordland is on the west coast, but is in the Southland Region rather than the West Coast Region.

Inhabitants of the West Coast are colloquially known as "Coasters".

== Geography ==
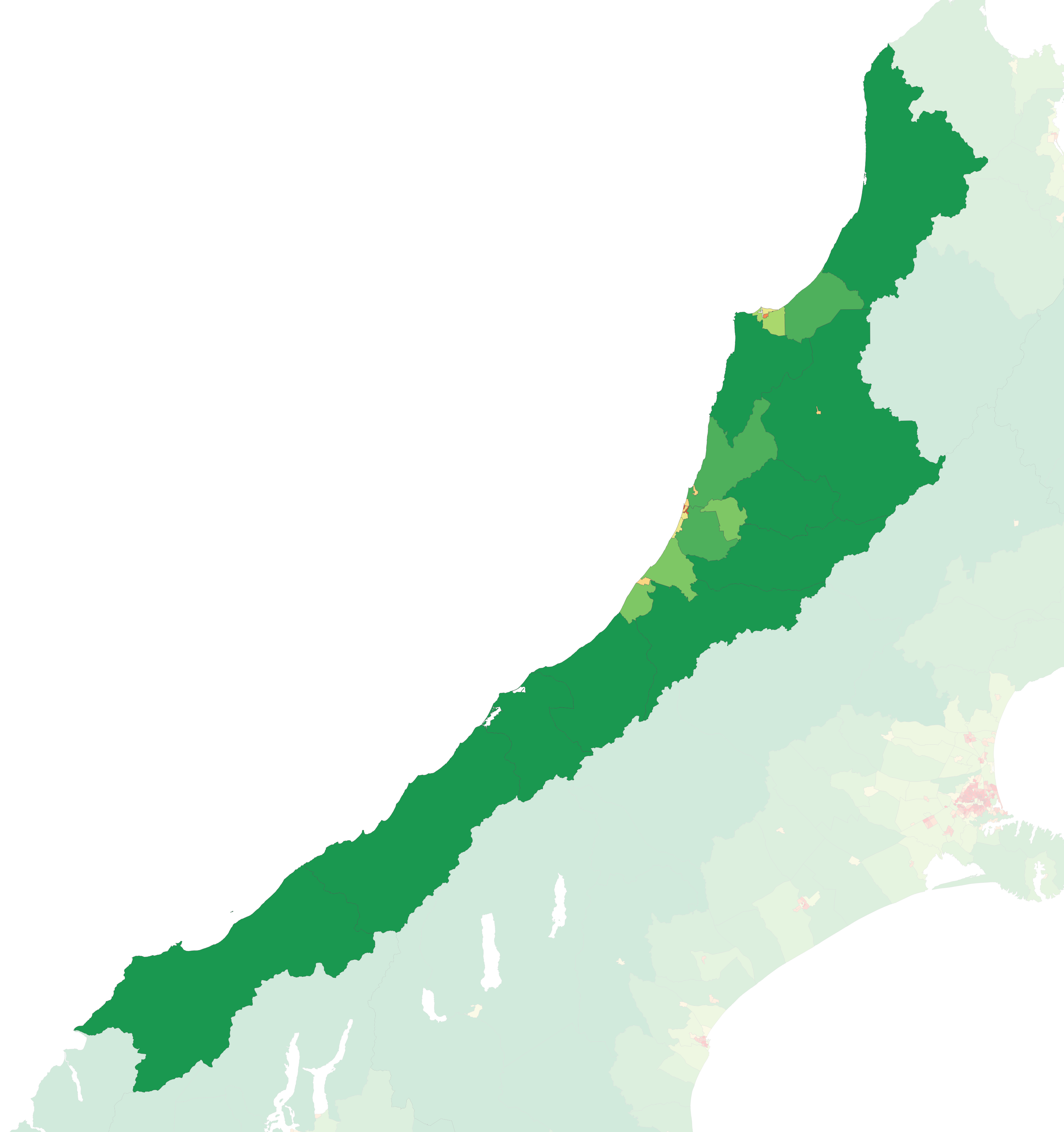
A map showing population density in the West Coast Region at the 2023 census

The region reaches from Kahurangi Point in the north to Awarua Point in the south, a distance of 600 kilometres (370 miles). It has an area of 23,246 km^{2}. To the west is the Tasman Sea (which like the Southern Ocean can be very rough, with four-metre swells common), and to the east are the Southern Alps. Much of the land is rugged, with a coastal plain where much of the population resides. It is divided into the three local government districts of (from north to south) Buller, Grey and Westland.

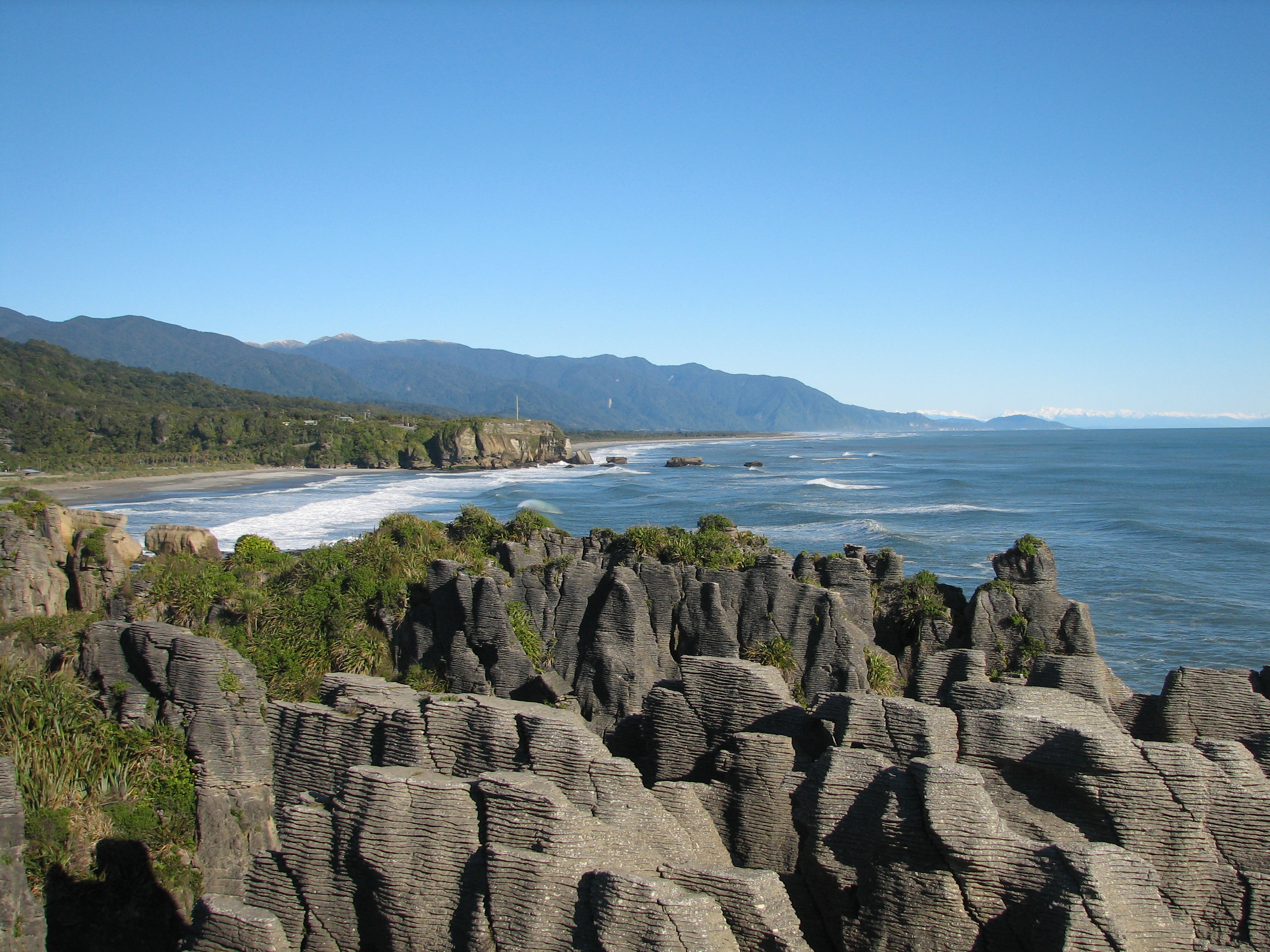
Pancake Rocks, Punakaiki

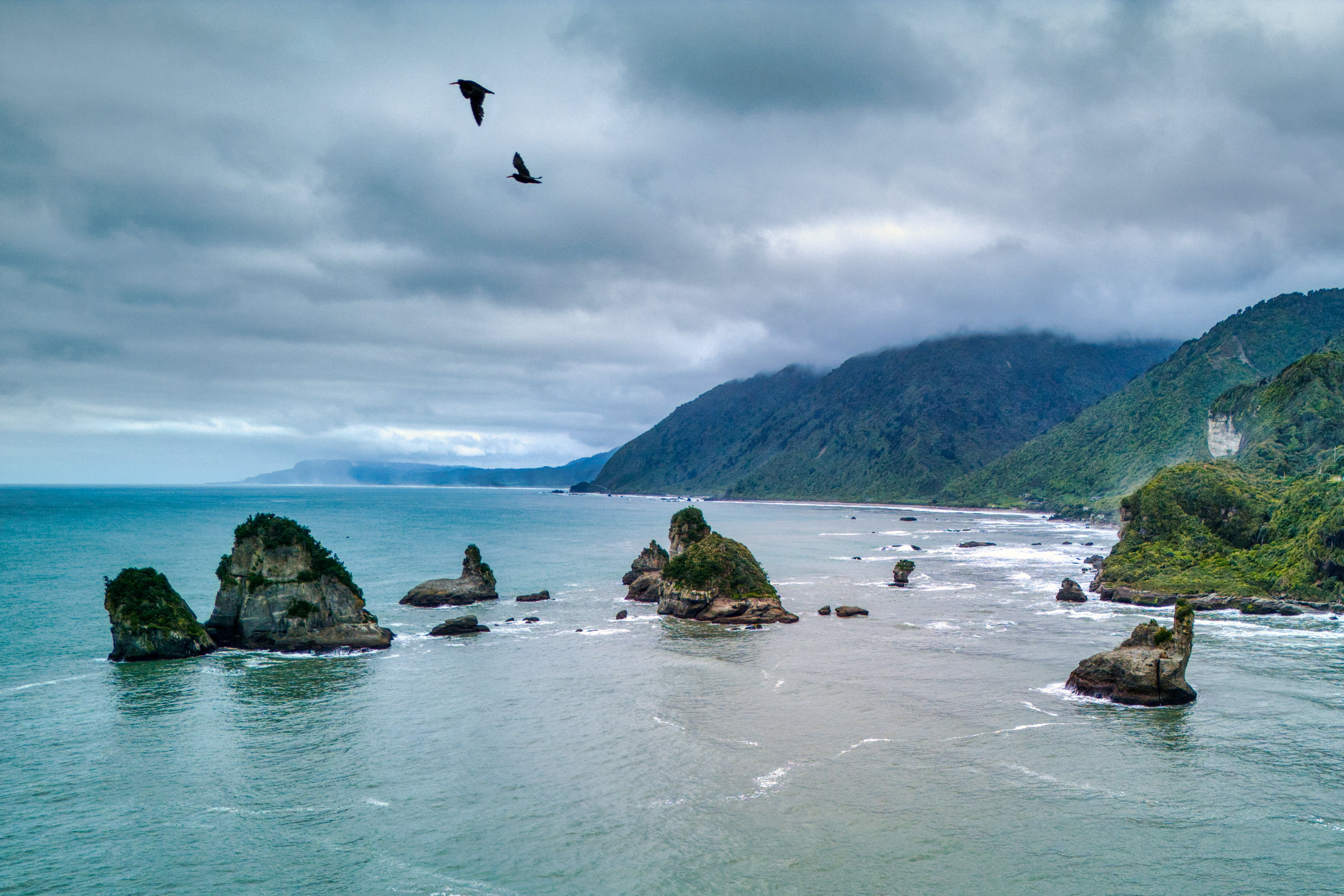
Motukiekie Rocks

The land has wild coastlines, mountains and a very high proportion of native bush, much of it native temperate rain forest. It is the only part of New Zealand where significant tracts of lowland forest remain: elsewhere, for instance on the Canterbury Plains and in the Firth of Thames, they have been almost completely destroyed for settlement and agriculture.

Scenic areas include the Haast Pass, Fox and Franz Josef Glaciers, Hokitika Gorge, Lake Brunner, the Pancake Rocks at Punakaiki, the Oparara Arches and the Heaphy Track.

The region has very high rainfall due to the prevailing northwesterly wind pattern and the location of the Southern Alps, which give rise to heavy orographic precipitation. The rain shadow effect is responsible for the relatively arid climate of the Canterbury Plains on the other side of the Southern Alps.

Climate data for Hokitika Airport (1936–2015, Humidity 1961–2015, Sunshine 1964–2015)
Month	Jan	Feb	Mar	Apr	May	Jun	Jul	Aug	Sep	Oct	Nov	Dec	Year
Mean daily maximum °C (°F)	19.4 (66.9)	19.8 (67.6)	18.8 (65.8)	16.6 (61.9)	14.3 (57.7)	12.3 (54.1)	11.9 (53.4)	12.6 (54.7)	13.8 (56.8)	14.9 (58.8)	16.4 (61.5)	18.2 (64.8)	15.7 (60.3)
Mean daily minimum °C (°F)	11.7 (53.1)	11.9 (53.4)	10.7 (51.3)	8.5 (47.3)	6.0 (42.8)	3.8 (38.8)	2.9 (37.2)	4.0 (39.2)	5.8 (42.4)	7.3 (45.1)	8.7 (47.7)	10.7 (51.3)	7.7 (45.9)
Average rainfall mm (inches)	242.3 (9.54)	178.9 (7.04)	215.0 (8.46)	235.8 (9.28)	242.1 (9.53)	249.3 (9.81)	219.3 (8.63)	231.9 (9.13)	256.5 (10.10)	276.3 (10.88)	239.6 (9.43)	268.5 (10.57)	2,849.7 (112.19)
Average rainy days (≥ 1.0 mm)	12.4	10.4	12.6	13.3	14.7	13.8	13.5	14.8	16.8	17.3	15.0	15.8	170.5
Mean monthly sunshine hours	209.5	186.8	171.9	139.9	119.2	104.0	124.3	138.9	142.8	164.1	181.1	194.6	1,877
Source: CliFlo

Climate data for West Coast
Month	Jan	Feb	Mar	Apr	May	Jun	Jul	Aug	Sep	Oct	Nov	Dec	Year
Record high °C (°F)	34.5 (94.1)	33.5 (92.3)	30.2 (86.4)	26.0 (78.8)	26.7 (80.1)	21.4 (70.5)	20.0 (68.0)	20.8 (69.4)	24.8 (76.6)	26.2 (79.2)	30.9 (87.6)	30.6 (87.1)	34.5 (94.1)
Mean daily maximum °C (°F)	19.9 (67.8)	20.4 (68.7)	19.1 (66.4)	16.6 (61.9)	14.2 (57.6)	11.9 (53.4)	11.6 (52.9)	12.5 (54.5)	13.9 (57.0)	15.1 (59.2)	16.7 (62.1)	18.5 (65.3)	15.9 (60.6)
Daily mean °C (°F)	15.5 (59.9)	15.9 (60.6)	14.6 (58.3)	12.2 (54.0)	9.9 (49.8)	7.7 (45.9)	7.1 (44.8)	8.1 (46.6)	9.6 (49.3)	11.0 (51.8)	12.5 (54.5)	14.3 (57.7)	11.5 (52.7)
Mean daily minimum °C (°F)	11.2 (52.2)	11.4 (52.5)	10.1 (50.2)	7.9 (46.2)	5.7 (42.3)	3.6 (38.5)	2.7 (36.9)	3.8 (38.8)	5.4 (41.7)	6.9 (44.4)	8.3 (46.9)	10.2 (50.4)	7.3 (45.1)
Record low °C (°F)	0.2 (32.4)	0.1 (32.2)	−2.5 (27.5)	−5.0 (23.0)	−8.0 (17.6)	−9.2 (15.4)	−9.2 (15.4)	−7.0 (19.4)	−7.1 (19.2)	−6.4 (20.5)	−3.0 (26.6)	−2.0 (28.4)	−9.2 (15.4)
Average rainfall mm (inches)	267.8 (10.54)	219.9 (8.66)	239.7 (9.44)	248.7 (9.79)	250.2 (9.85)	250.0 (9.84)	213.2 (8.39)	254.5 (10.02)	276.0 (10.87)	272.3 (10.72)	260.2 (10.24)	305.5 (12.03)	3,058 (120.39)
Average rainy days (≥ 1.0 mm)	14.5	12.6	14.7	15.1	16.6	15.8	15.5	17.2	19.3	19.6	17.5	18.0	196.4
Source: Weatherbase

== History ==
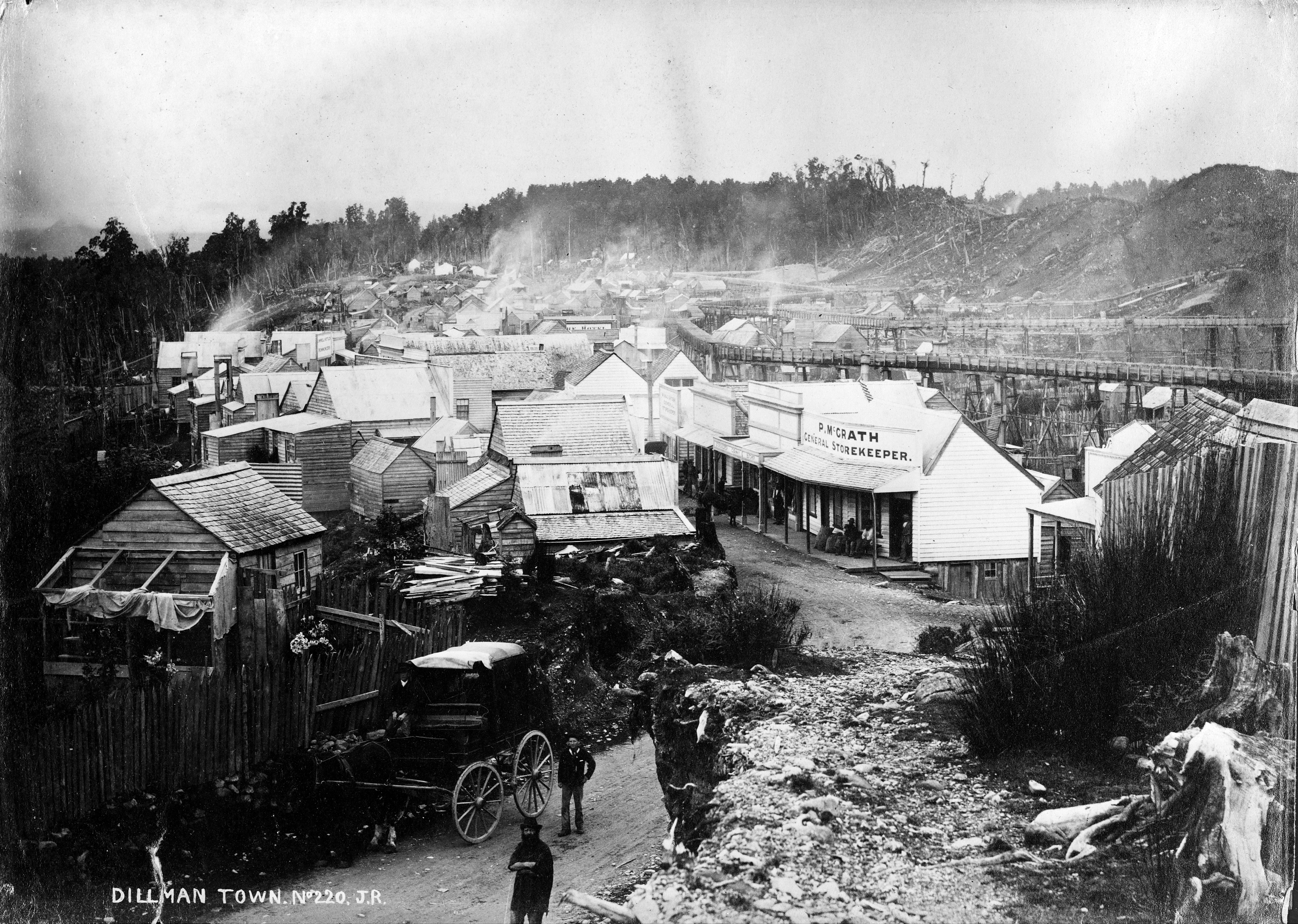
Dillmanstown, a gold mining town

The region is home to Ngāi Tahu, who value it for the greenstone (pounamu) found there in abundance.

The region was only occasionally visited by Europeans until the discovery of gold near the Taramakau River in 1864 by two Māori, Ihaia Tainui and Haimona Taukau. By the end of the year there were an estimated 1800 prospectors, many of them around the Hokitika area, which in 1866 was briefly the most populous settlement in New Zealand.

The region was divided between Nelson Province and Canterbury Province from 1853: in 1873 the Canterbury portion of the region formed its own province, the Westland Province, until the abolition of the provincial system in 1876.

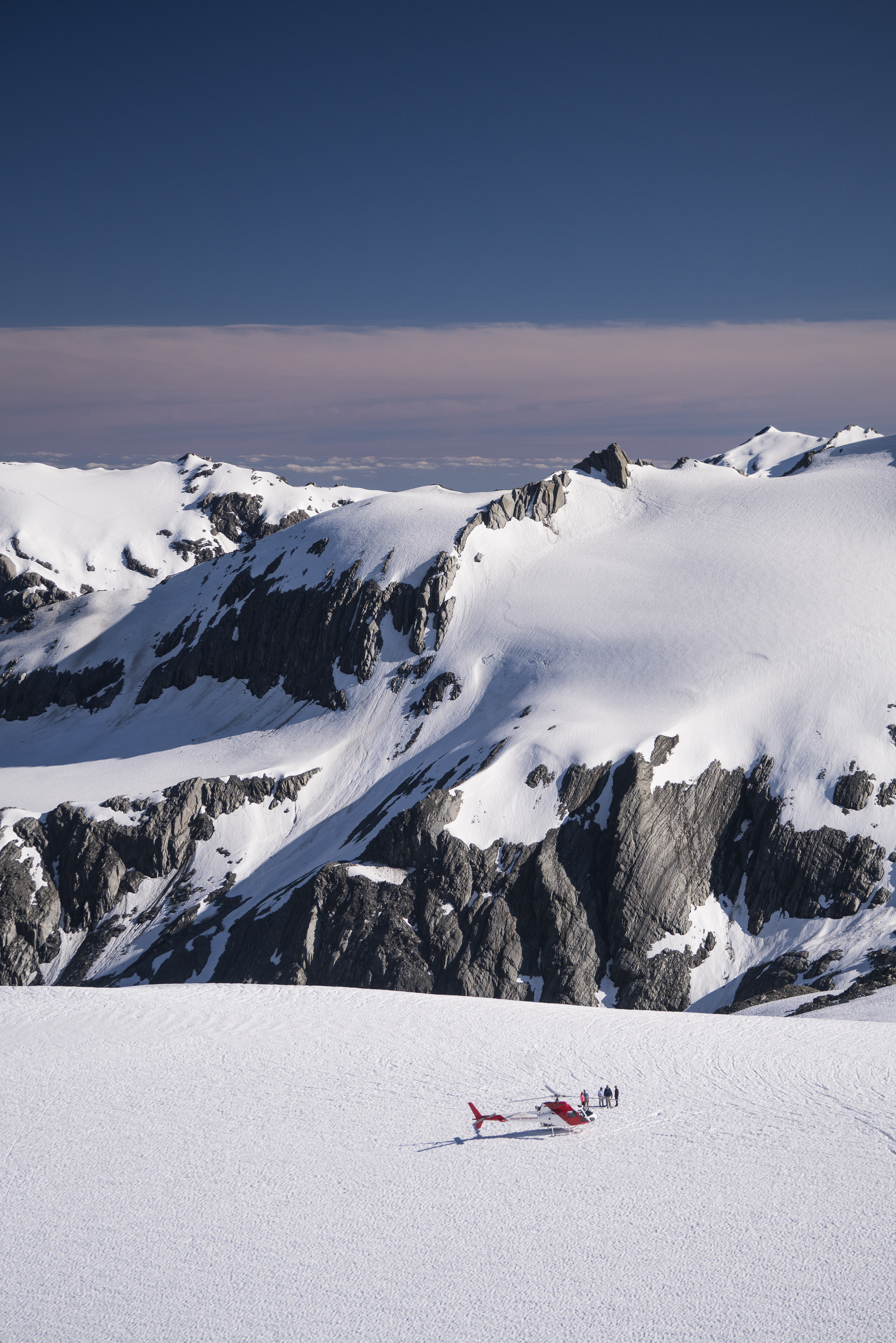
Fox Glacier, a popular visitor destination on the West Coast

The West Coast gold rush between 1864 and 1867 created numerous gold rush towns such as Ōkārito, which at one time was the largest town on the West Coast but quickly almost vanished as miners moved on. After that time, the population dwindled, but the main towns that still exist had become established.

Following greenstone and gold, the next valuable mineral was coal. Discovered near the Buller River in the mid-1840s, mining began in earnest during the 1860s. By the 1880s coal had become the region's main industry, with mines throughout the northern half of the region, especially around Westport. Many of these continued in operation until the mid-20th century, and several survive. In the 1950s there was a brief uranium rush after radioactive minerals were found in the Buller Gorge in 1955, but the deposits were not found to be commercially viable.

Timber has also long been a major industry, although in recent years there has been an uneasy balance between forestry for wood and forestry for conservation. Much of the region is public land administered by the Department of Conservation and the region has some of the best remaining stands of native forest, along with a wealth of rare wildlife. Ecotourism is now an important industry, and this goes hand in hand with the conservation efforts.

== Population ==
The West Coast Region covers 23,245.52 km^{2} (8,975.15 sq mi) and has an estimated population of 34,700 as of June 2025, 0.7% of New Zealand's population. It is the least populous of New Zealand's sixteen regions. The West Coast is also the most sparsely populated region, with just 1.49 people per square kilometre (3.87 per square mile).

Historical population
Year	Pop.	±% p.a.
1991	31,563	—
1996	32,511	+0.59%
2001	30,303	−1.40%
2006	31,326	+0.67%
2013	32,148	+0.37%
2018	31,575	−0.36%
2023	33,390	+1.12%

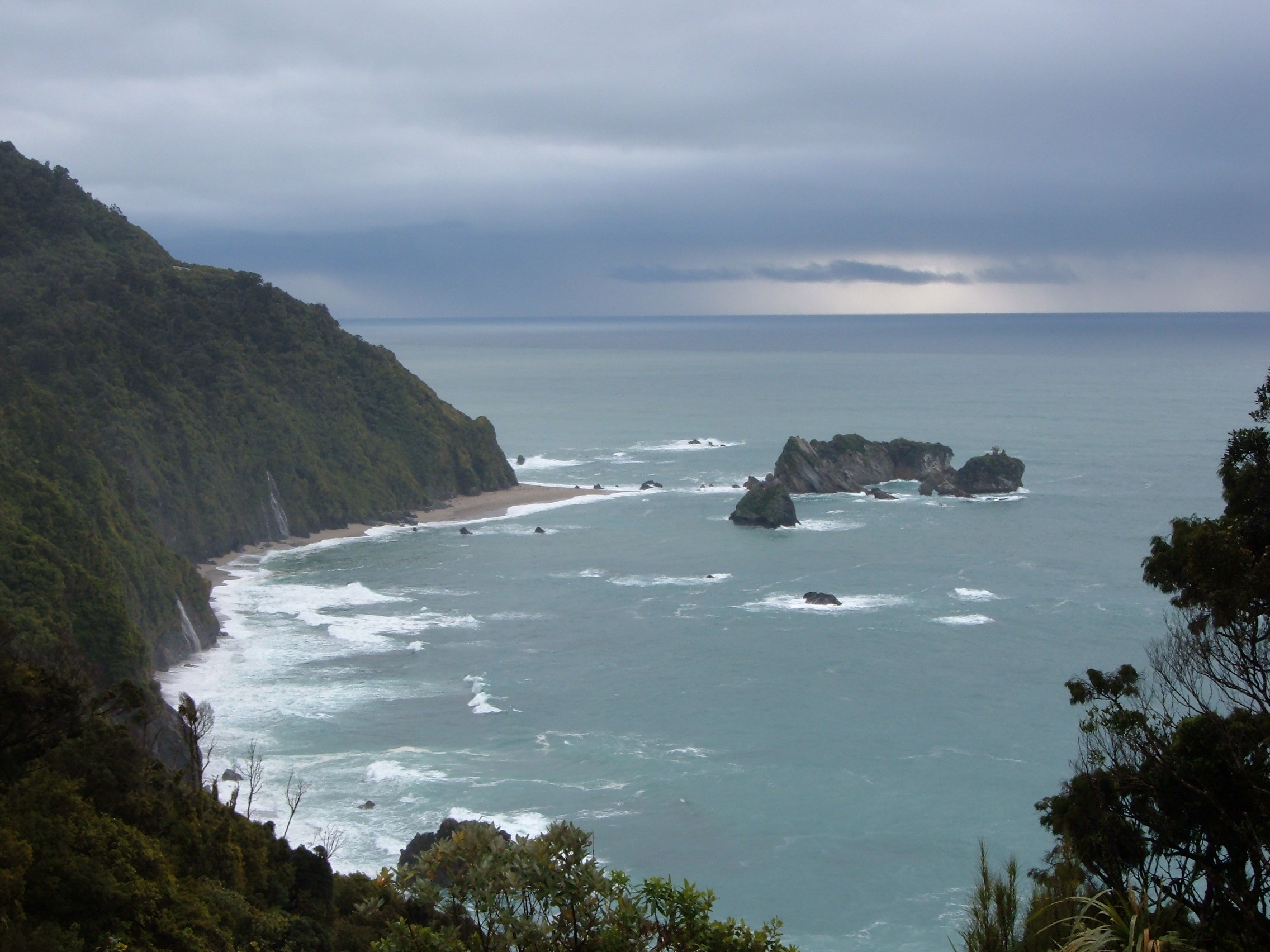
Knights Point, typical rugged coastline of the West Coast

West Coast Region had a population of 33,390 in the 2023 New Zealand census, an increase of 1,815 people (5.7%) since the 2018 census, and an increase of 1,242 people (3.9%) since the 2013 census. There were 17,031 males, 16,245 females and 117 people of other genders in 14,793 dwellings. 2.7% of people identified as LGBTIQ+. The median age was 48.1 years (compared with 38.1 years nationally). There were 5,448 people (16.3%) aged under 15 years, 4,518 (13.5%) aged 15 to 29, 15,861 (47.5%) aged 30 to 64, and 7,563 (22.7%) aged 65 or older.

People could identify as more than one ethnicity. The results were 89.7% European (Pākehā); 13.5% Māori; 1.6% Pasifika; 4.0% Asian; 0.5% Middle Eastern, Latin American and African New Zealanders (MELAA); and 4.3% other, which includes people giving their ethnicity as "New Zealander". English was spoken by 98.0%, Māori language by 2.3%, Samoan by 0.2% and other languages by 5.6%. No language could be spoken by 1.5% (e.g. too young to talk). New Zealand Sign Language was known by 0.5%. The percentage of people born overseas was 13.2, compared with 28.8% nationally.

Religious affiliations were 29.8% Christian, 0.6% Hindu, 0.2% Islam, 0.3% Māori religious beliefs, 0.4% Buddhist, 0.7% New Age, 0.1% Jewish, and 1.2% other religions. People who answered that they had no religion were 57.8%, and 9.0% of people did not answer the census question.

Of those at least 15 years old, 2,658 (9.5%) people had a bachelor's or higher degree, 15,825 (56.6%) had a post-high school certificate or diploma, and 8,490 (30.4%) people exclusively held high school qualifications. The median income was $32,700, compared with $41,500 nationally. 1,956 people (7.0%) earned over $100,000 compared to 12.1% nationally. The employment status of those at least 15 was that 12,819 (45.9%) people were employed full-time, 4,101 (14.7%) were part-time, and 687 (2.5%) were unemployed.

=== Cities and towns ===
There are five towns with a population over 1,000: Greymouth, Westport, Hokitika, Runanga and Reefton. These five towns are recognised as urban areas by Statistics New Zealand.

During the gold rush days, Hokitika had a population of more than 25,000 with more than 100 pubs. A recreation of an early New Zealand settlement is at Shantytown.

Urban area	Population (June 2025)	% of region
Greymouth	8,610	24.8%
Westport	4,600	13.3%
Hokitika	3,420	9.9%
Runanga	1,200	3.5%
Reefton	1,050	3.0%
Dobson	610	1.8%
Kaniere	570	1.7%
Gloriavale	480	1.4%
Karamea	460	1.3%
Franz Josef	440	1.3%

Other towns and settlements include:

- Ahaura
- Blackball
- Carters Beach
- Fox Glacier
- Granity
- Haast
- Hari Hari
- Kaniere
- Kumara
- Ngakawau
- Ross
- Waimangaroa
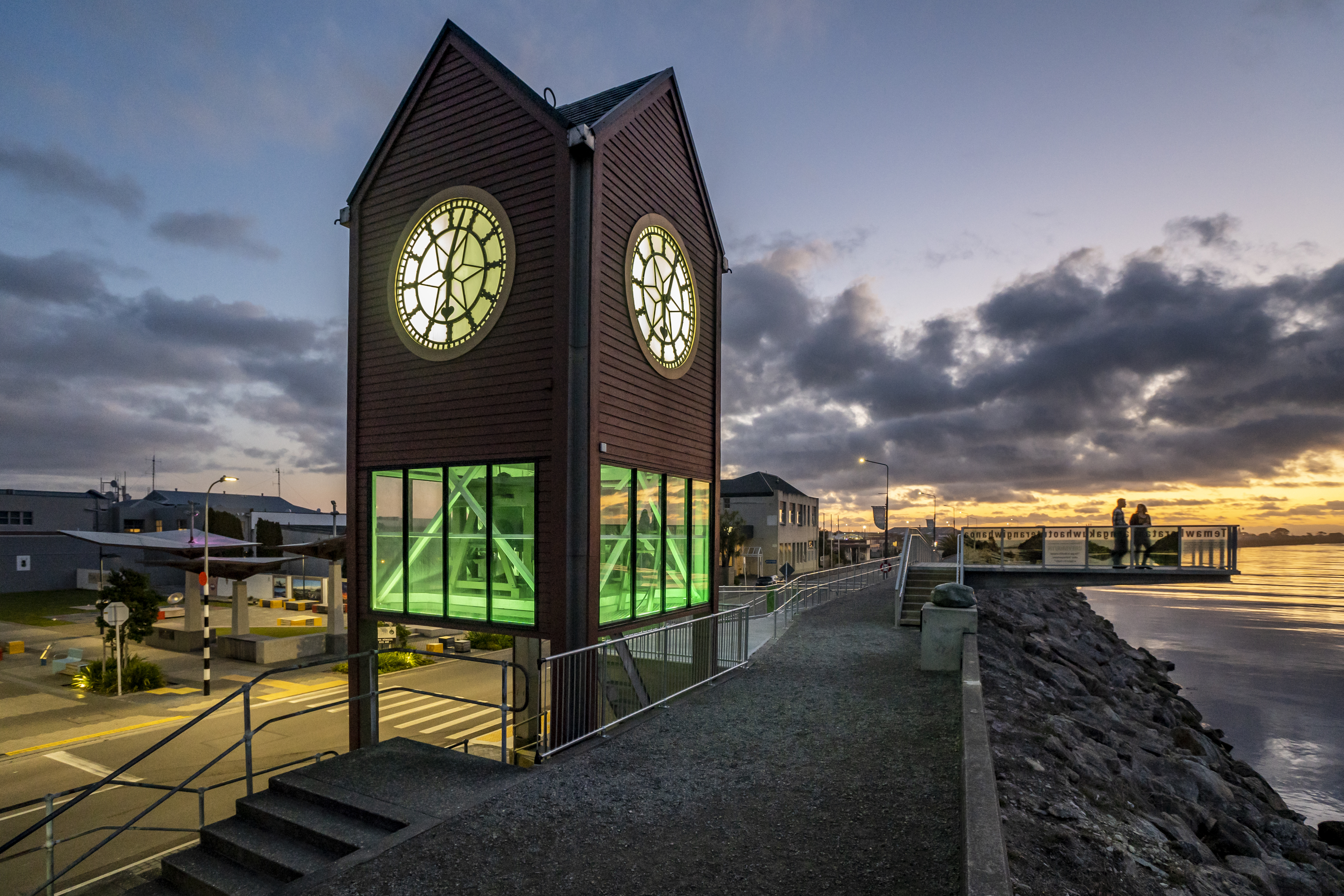
Greymouth

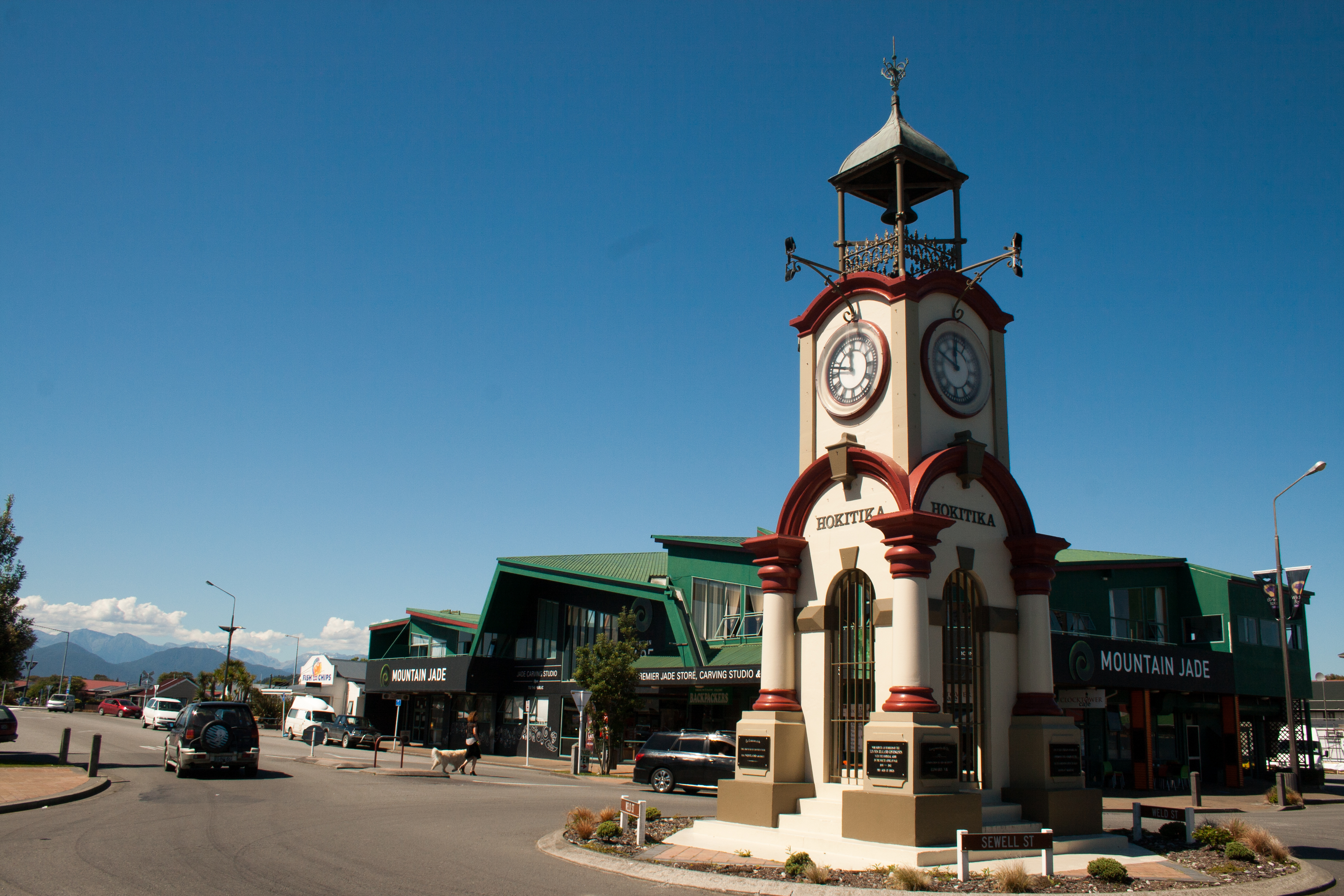
Hokitika

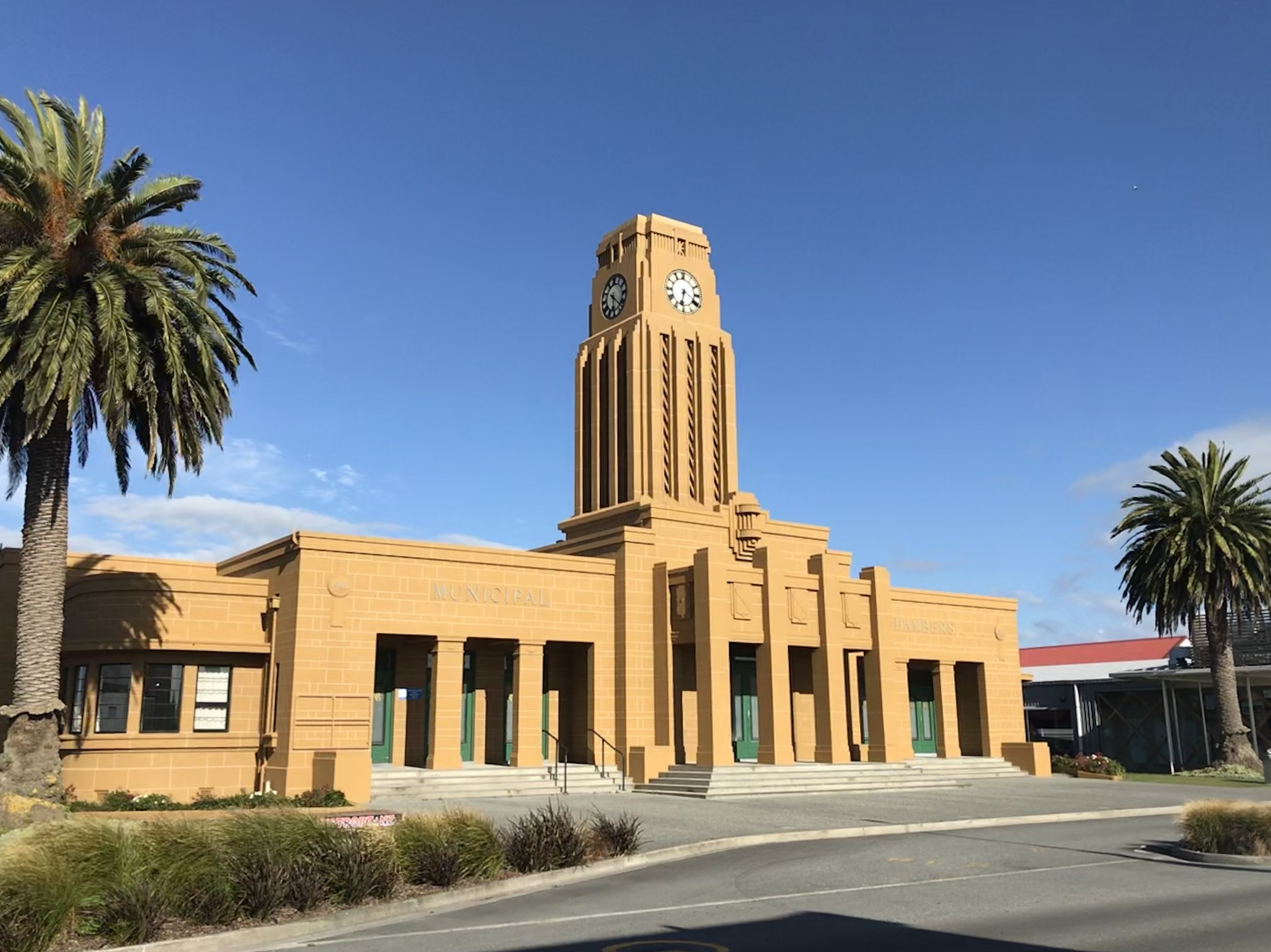
Westport

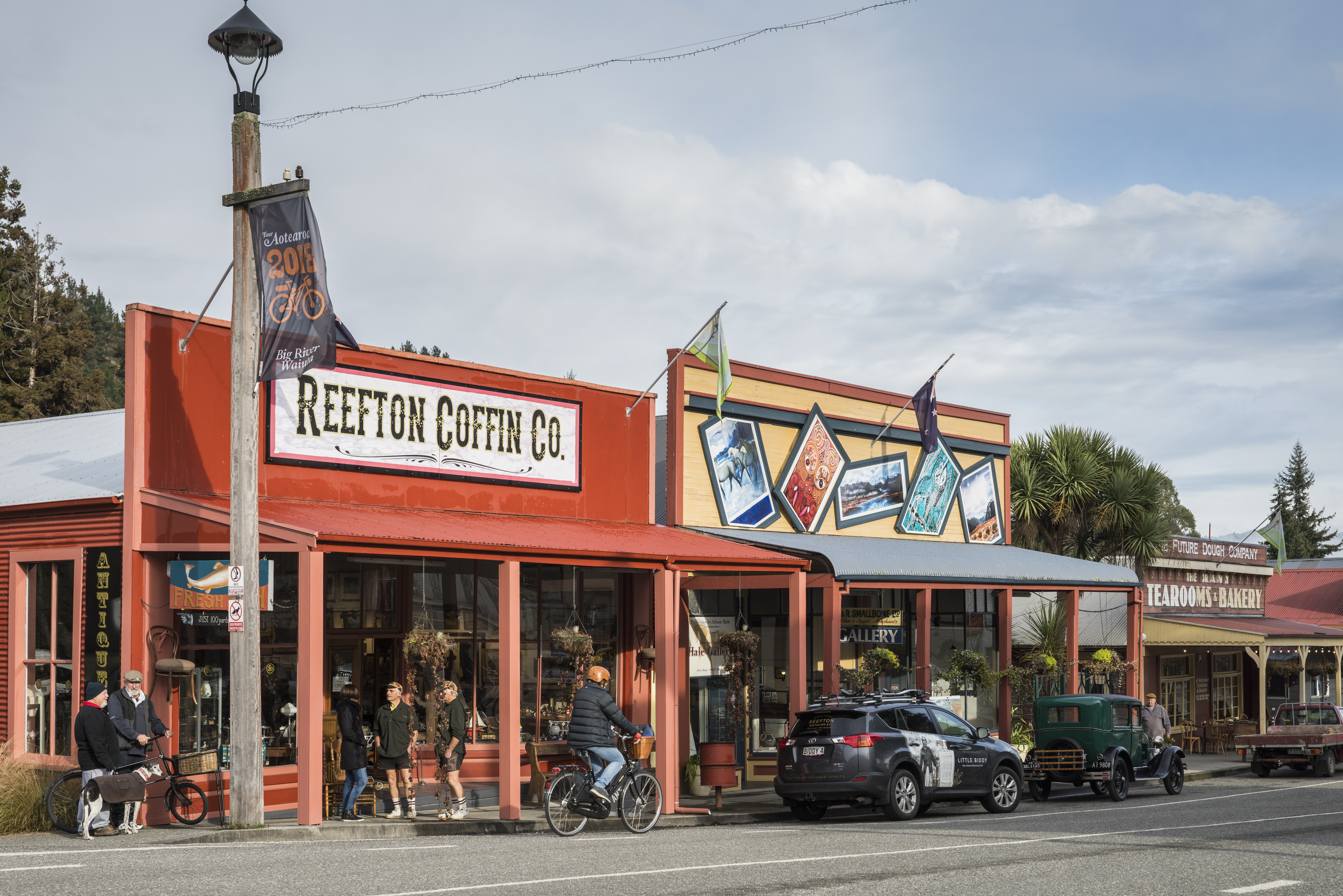
Reefton

== Regional council ==
The West Coast Region is governed by the West Coast Regional Council. As of 29 October 2025, the council is chaired by Colin Smith, with Mark McIntyre as deputy. The five other councillors are Allan Birchfield, Andy Campbell, Ashley Cassin, Chris Coll and Peter Ewen.

== Economy ==
The subnational gross domestic product (GDP) of the West Coast was estimated at NZ$2,373 million in the year to March 2022, 0.7% of New Zealand's national GDP. The regional GDP per capita was estimated at $72,127 in the same period.

Industries include mining for coal and alluvial gold, forestry and wood processing, fishing (including whitebaiting), tourism, farming, manufacturing of greenstone jewellery, sphagnum moss gathering and stone-collection for garden landscaping. There is a brewery, Monteith's, in Greymouth. Dairy farming has grown strongly – the local dairy co-operative Westland Milk Products remained independent when most others merged to form Fonterra in 2001. In the 2019–2020 season, there were 150,000 milking cows on the West Coast, 3.0% of the country's total herd. The cows produced 50,700 tonnes of milk solids, worth $365 million at the national average farmgate price ($7.20 per kg).

== Flora and fauna ==
The region has the only New Zealand nesting place of the kōtuku (white heron), at the Waitangiroto Nature Reserve, visited by tours from the small farming township of Whataroa. This rare bird appears on the $2 coin.

The region was recorded in 1998 as having over 175 taxa of marine algal flora from collections in the region. Significant features of the region's algal flora are hard to discern on the basis of existing knowledge, but include the virtual absence of some common New Zealand species, and extensions to the known distribution of others.

Over 80% of West Coast land is administered by the Department of Conservation, much of this being in National Parks. These include from north to south, parts of Kahurangi NP, Paparoa NP, parts of Arthurs Pass NP, Westland NP, parts of Aspiring NP plus the South Westland World Heritage Area. Each of these parks have flora and fauna common to all areas, as well as species, like kiwi, particular to those areas.

== Transport ==
Four roads run into the West Coast Region. The main road running the length of the region is State Highway 6. It connects to the Tasman District in the north through the Buller Gorge, and to Otago in the south via Haast Pass. Two roads connect to Canterbury to the east, State Highway 7 through Lewis Pass to North Canterbury and State Highway 73 via Arthur's Pass to Christchurch.

The Midland railway line is the only railway line into the region. It links to Christchurch via Arthur's Pass. The TranzAlpine train service runs return between Christchurch and Greymouth daily and freight lines extend to Ngākawau and Hokitika.

Daily passenger flights operate into the region. Air New Zealand flies between Christchurch and Hokitika and Sounds Air between Wellington and Westport.

== See also ==
- Public transport in New Zealand
- Water pollution in the West Coast, New Zealand
