= Fantail Falls =

Waterfall in Haast Pass, New Zealand

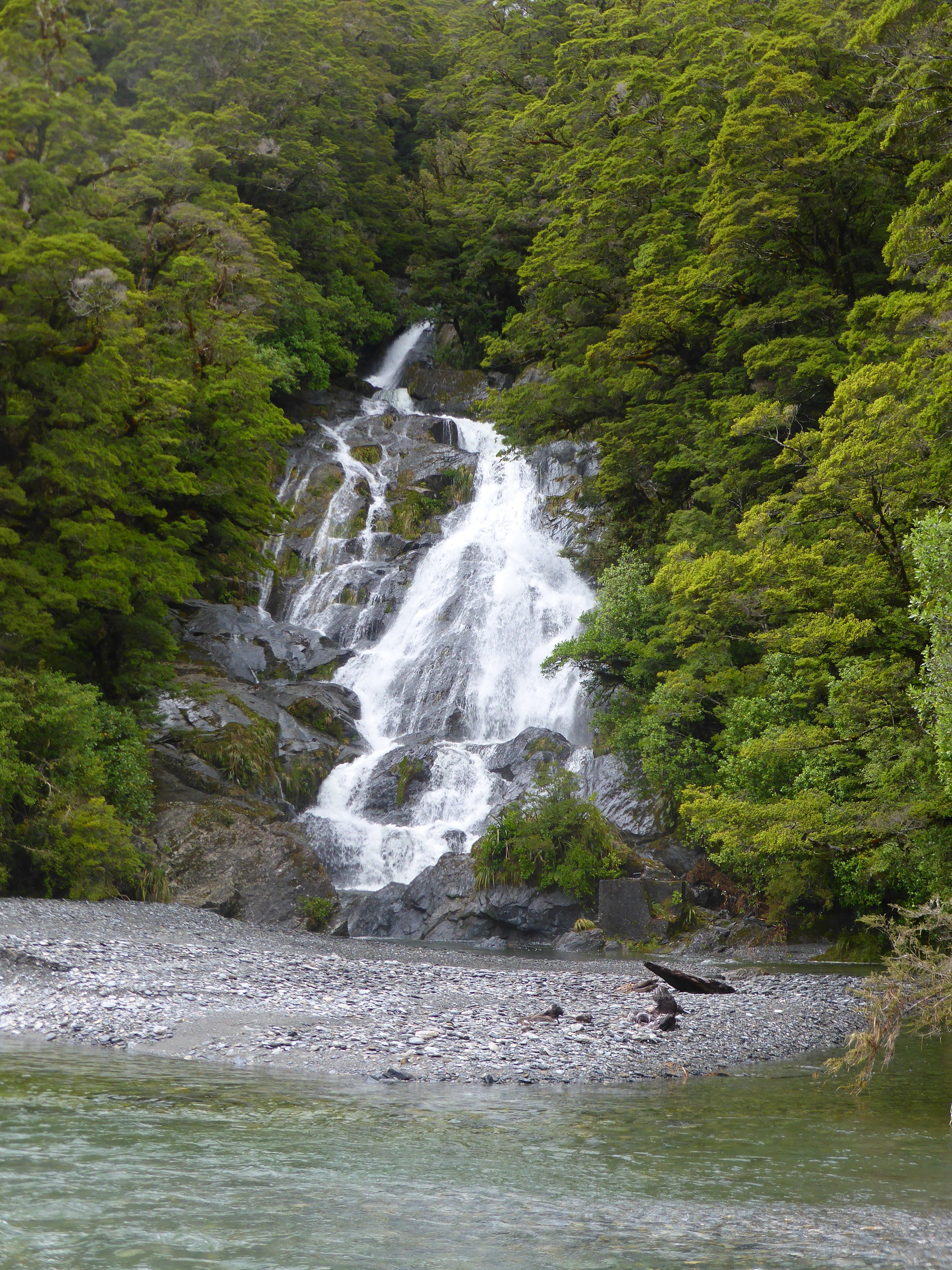
- Fantail Falls
- Interactive map of Fantail Falls
- Location: Mount Aspiring National Park, New Zealand
- Coordinates: 44°4′42.02″S 169°23′10.00″E
- Type: Segmented
- Total height: 23 metres (75 ft)
- Watercourse: Fantail Creek

Fantail Falls is a waterfall in Mount Aspiring National Park, Westland District, New Zealand.

The waterfall is in the Haast Pass, between the Gates of Haast and the pass itself, at an altitude of 450 metres (1,476 ft). It marks where Fantail Creek enters the Haast River, with a drop of 23 metres (75 ft).

Its name derives from the way it spreads out into the shape of a fan at its base, rather than any similarity to the tail of the native bird known as the fantail (pīwakawaka or Rhipidura fuliginosa).

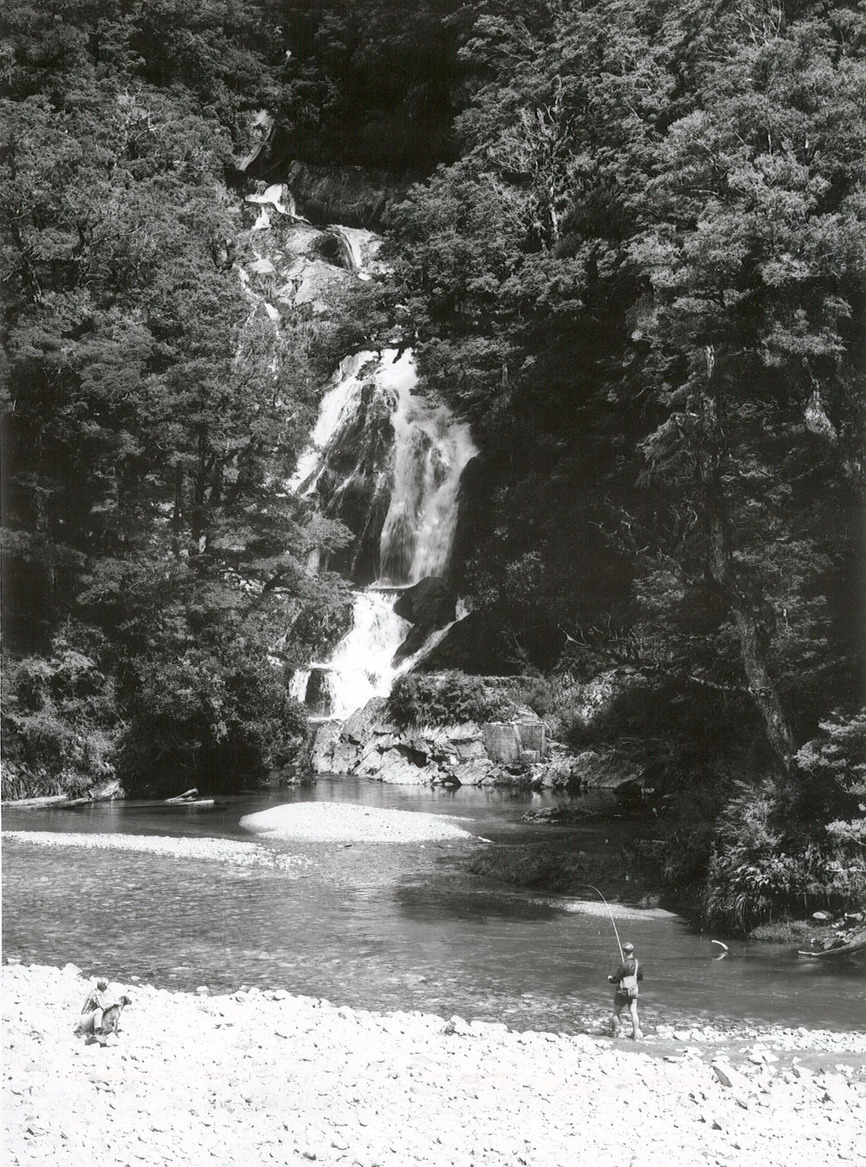
The falls in 1965, taken by the National Publicity Studios

For many years, beginning in the late 1930s, the waterfall had a hydroelectric power plant at its base, which provided power for roadwork machinery being used to construct a road from Makarora to Jackson Bay. The road was commissioned by the Ministry of Public Works and was the first road over the Haast Pass. It was not completed until 1960.

A 5-minute wheelchair-accessible bush walk leads to the riverbank opposite the waterfall from a carpark on State Highway 6. In addition, a steep 5 kilometres (3.1 mi) walk to the Brewster Hut, serviced by the Department of Conservation, starts at the base of the falls.

The walk to the falls passes through almost pure silver beech (Lophozonia menziesii) forest, as these falls are at a higher altitude than the other Haast Pass waterfalls, Roaring Billy Falls (80 m above sea level) and Thunder Creek Falls (110 m), which are set in mixed beech/podocarp forest. Underneath the beech canopy the forest floor is dominated by prickly shield fern (Polystichum vestitum), horopito (Pseudowintera colorata), and broadleaf (Griselinia littoralis).

== See also ==
- List of waterfalls
- List of waterfalls in New Zealand
