= Knights Point =

Headland in New Zealand

- Point
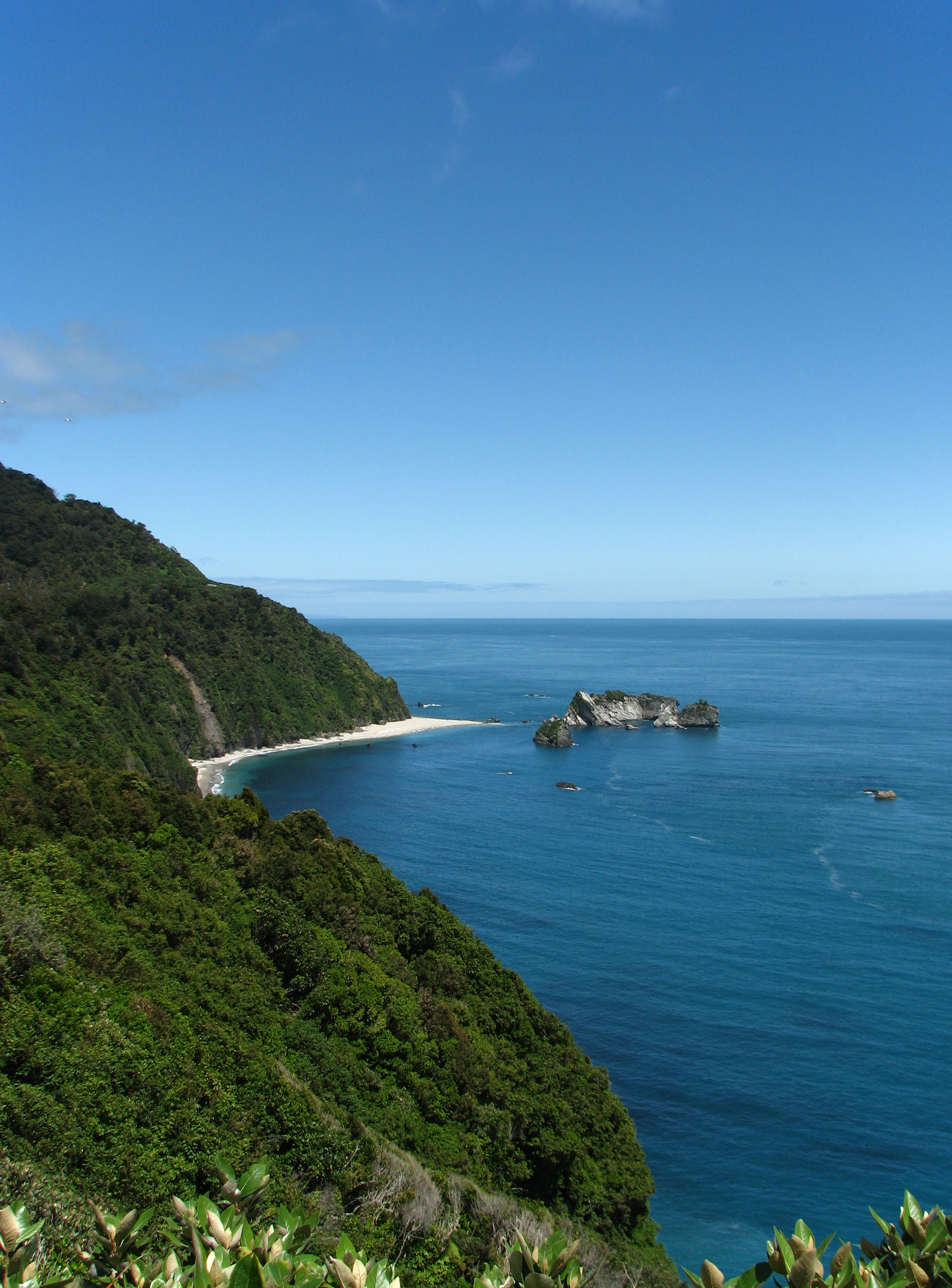
- View from Knights Point lookout to Arnott Point

- Location within New Zealand
- Coordinates: 43°42′45.9″S 169°13′30″E
- Location: Westland District, New Zealand
- Water bodies: Tasman Sea
- Etymology: Named after the dog of one of the construction crew who built the road through the area
- Defining authority: New Zealand Geographic Board

Knights Point is on the West Coast of New Zealand's South Island.

The 1950s were a time of infrastructure development in New Zealand. A related project was the building by the Ministry of Works of a road from the South Island's east coast, across Haast Pass and up the west coast to join the road that terminated at Ross.

Progress was made by pushing the road across the Haast Pass to near the mouth of the Haast River where a bridge was constructed to take the road north along the coast. A second crew began construction south of Ross and progressed south.

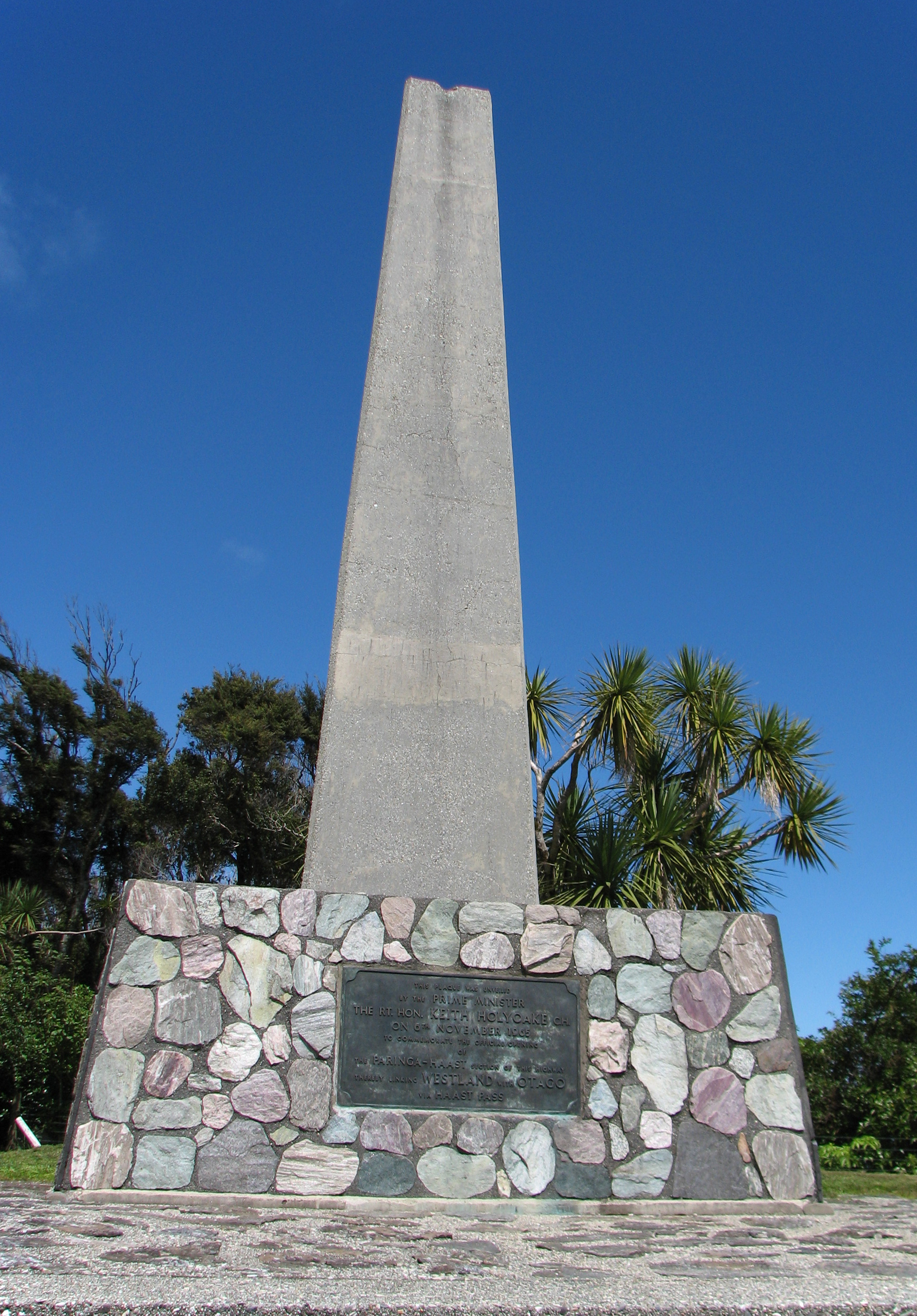
The obelisk monument at Knights Point was set up to celebrate the completion of the highway connecting Westland with Otago.

The two teams met north of Haast, on the coast. As the time for the official opening of the road drew near, officials from the Ministry of Works journeyed to the meeting point to make arrangements for a commemorative monument by the roadside. In the course of conversation with the construction crew, it was mentioned that the location should be named after a senior official of the Ministry of Works employed in the head office in Wellington, the national capital.

The construction crew informed the delegation from Wellington that the area had already been named Knights Point. The officials inquired who "Knight" was and were informed that he was the surveyor's dog. Knights Point was named after Norman McGeorge's dog Knight.

The official opening of this last section of the highway that is now State Highway 6 was on 6 November 1965.

Today the site includes a car park and viewing platform overlooking the coast towards Arnott Point, a resting area for New Zealand fur seals and occasionally elephant seals.
