= Haast =

Haast is a German family name. It may refer to:

- High Availability for Asterisk, a software package which turns any two Asterisk servers into a cluster
- Bill Haast (1910–2011), founder of the Miami Serpentarium and pioneering snake venom collector
- Julius von Haast (1822–1887), German geologist and explorer of New Zealand; several things in New Zealand are named for him:
  - Haast's eagle, extinct species of giant eagle identified by Haast and eventually named for him
  - Haast, New Zealand, township on the Tasman Sea
    - Haast Aerodrome, aerodrome adjacent Haast in New Zealand
  - Haast Pass, a mountain pass in the Southern Alps
  - Haast River, a river on the West Coast of the South Island
  - Haast Schist, kind of rock found in New Zealand
- Anne Haast (born 1993), Dutch chess player
- Cees Haast (1938–2019), Dutch cyclist
