= Ōhikaiti River =

River in New Zealand's South Island

Coordinates: 41.849519°S 171.730652°E

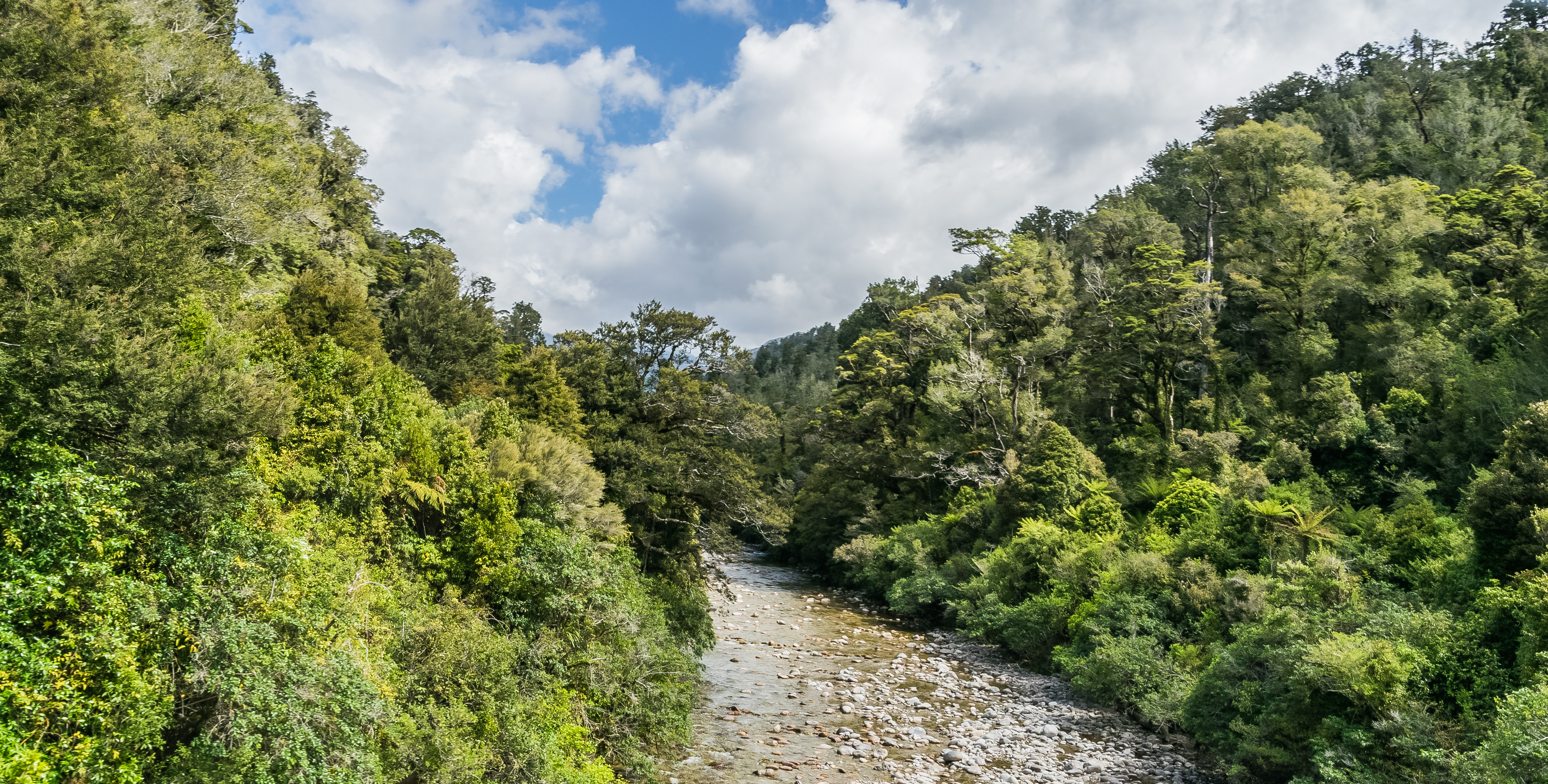

Location
- Country: New Zealand

Physical characteristics
- Source
  - location: Mount Galileo Paparoa Range
  - elevation: 1,256 metres (4,121 ft)
- Mouth
  - location: Buller River
  - elevation: 20 metres (66 ft)
- Length: 12 kilometres (7.5 mi)

The Ōhikaiti River is a river of the West Coast Region of New Zealand's South Island. It flows north from Mount Galileo, in the Paparoa Range, paralleling the course of the larger Ōhikanui River which lies two kilometres to the west. The Ōhikaiti empties into the Buller River at the Buller Gorge, 15 kilometres southwest of Westport.

The New Zealand Ministry for Culture and Heritage gives a translation of "place of small incantations" for Ōhikaiti.

Ōhikaiti River has been the official name of the river since it was gazetted on 21 June 2019. The explanation is given that 'o' means place of, 'hika' is a ritual and 'iti' and 'nui' are small and large. The ritual was for a chief, Te Pūoho-o-te-rangi, who died during a raid.

The river generally follows the Ōhikaiti Fault, which probably formed about 35 million years ago.

A totara bridge over the Little Ohika was built in 1877, but damaged by a flood on 4 November 1877. It was replaced in 1889 by a bridge over the Ohika-iti, with four spans of 30 ft (9.1 m) and one of 20 ft (6.1 m). The 1938 concrete bridge has two spans of 45 ft (14 m) and two of 30 ft (9.1 m). SH6 now crosses the river near its mouth.

== See also ==
- List of rivers of New Zealand
