= Ōhikanui River =

River in New Zealand

Coordinates: 41.844857°S 171.712831°E

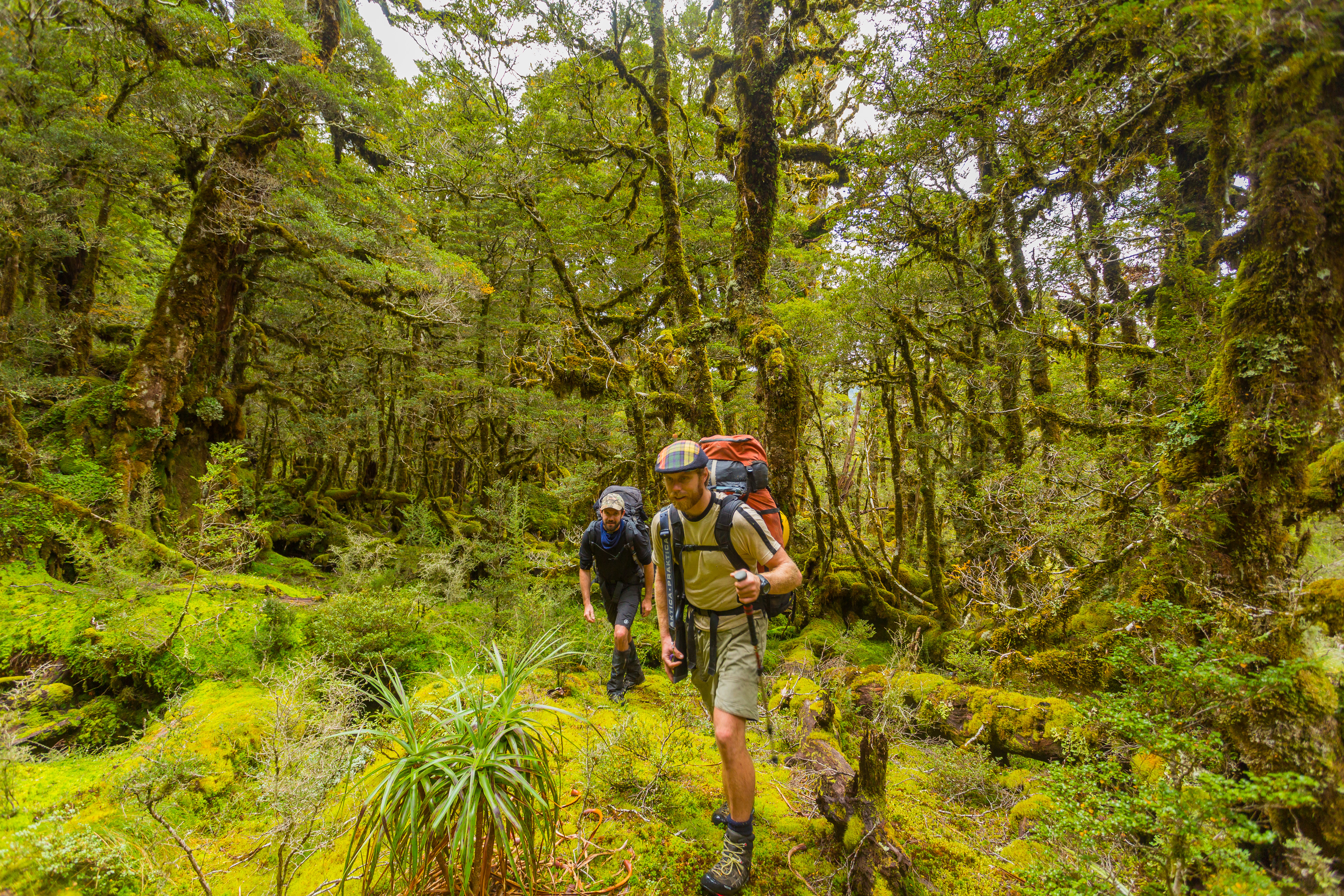
- Bush in the Ōhikanui valley

Location
- Country: New Zealand

Physical characteristics
- Source
  - location: Mount Uriah, Paparoa Range
  - elevation: 1,525 metres (5,003 ft)
- Mouth
  - location: Buller River
  - elevation: 20 metres (66 ft)
- Length: 30 kilometres (19 mi)

The Ōhikanui River is a tributary of the Buller River in New Zealand's South Island. It flows north for 30 km (19 mi), joining the Buller 20 km (12 mi) from its outflow into the Tasman Sea. It and its smaller neighbour the Ōhikaiti River are often called the Big Ohika River and Little Ohika River respectively. Another variation is Ohika-nui. Ōhikanui River has been the official name since 21 June 2019.

The New Zealand Ministry for Culture and Heritage gives a translation of "place of large incantations" for Ōhikanui.

A surveyor named the tributaries to the west of the Ōhikanui River using Greek letters, as Alpha, Beta, Gamma, Delta, Epsilon, Eta, Theta and Iota Creeks. He also named Dumpling Creek after he returned to camp on a cold wet day and was given a dumpling stew.

The Ōhikanui River is a tributary consisting of a bouldery river bed and clear swift water. It flows through the paparoa wilderness area which is unaltered (with no tracks or huts), though Buckland Peak Hut is just outside the catchment. The area is popular with trampers because of its natural environment, with Brown trout fishers, who use the river about 140 times a year, and with deer stalkers.

Most of the valley runs over a Late Devonian pluton of leucocratic muscovite granite. The mountains at the southern end of the valley, made of early Paleozoic Pecksniff metasedimentary gneiss, have been carved by glaciation to form cirques and sharp ridges. The valley has high glacial aggradation, and lower degradation, terraces.

There were never any sawmills in the valley. Forest covers the whole valley, with no grassy flats. Tall forest is replaced by stunted forest, merging to alpine scrub, at 800 m (2,600 ft) to 1,200 m (3,900 ft), depending on aspect, landform and cold air drainage. The valley has an average of over 2,540 mm (100 in) of rain, more than 200 wet days a year and rainfall has been measured at over 5 cm (2.0 in) per hour. In the 1970s red deer, goats and rats were scarce, possums in moderate numbers and stoats everywhere. The valley now has pest control as part of the Paparoa Range TB Management Area.

The lower valley has cabbage tree, northern rātā, rimu, kahikatea, kamahi, kanono, karamu, kareao, kiekie, kōwhai, māhoe, mataī, porokaiwhiri, toro, tutu, yellow silver pine, mountain toatoa and mountain beech. The middle valley has horopito, silver beech, tawhai raunui, mountain tōtara and rimu, with crown fern and bush rice grass (Microlaena avenacea) in the understorey. Silver and mountain beech dominate the upper slopes, with Archeria traversii and mountain neinei. Birds in the valley in the 1970s included blackbird, chaffinch, dunnock, greenfinch, goldfinch, kākāriki, karoro, kāhu, kākā, kakaruwai, kārearea, kawau, kawaupaka, kea, kererū, koekoeā, korimako, kōtare, kōtātā, ngirungiru, pihoihoi, pipipi, pīpīwharauroa, pīwakawaka, redpoll, riroriro, roroa, ruru, silvereye, skylark, song thrush, titipounamu, tūī, weka and whio.

A truss bridge over the Ōhikanui was finished in September 1879, though the approaches, which required rock-cutting, took until March 1880. Its spans were 3 x 60 ft (18 m) and 1 x 18 ft (5.5 m). It was built to cope with floods rising to 39 ft (12 m), but floods in 1925, 1967, 1970 and 1971 covered the bridge. The bridge was raised and rebuilt as a 272 ft (83 m) timber truss on concrete piers in 1927, though in later years it could only take light traffic and had to be supplemented by a bailey bridge. SH6 now crosses the river near its mouth on a concrete bridge built in 1992.

In 1962 the National government agreed in principle to building a 13.6MW hydro-electric power station, with a 58 m (190 ft) head, after Labour had refused in 1960. Since July 2001 the Buller Water Conservation Order has protected the river from development.
