= Wills River =

River in New Zealand

- Route of the Wills River
- Mouth of the Wills River Wills River (New Zealand)
- Etymology: Named after William John Wills

Location
- Country: New Zealand
- Region: West Coast
- District: Westland

Physical characteristics
- Source
  - coordinates: 44.0009°N 169.59°E
- Mouth
  - location: Haast River
  - coordinates: 44°02′43″S 169°23′13″E
- Length: 19 km (12 mi)

Basin features
- Progression: Wills River → Haast River → Tasman Sea
- Tributaries
  - left: Kea Creek, Hold Creek, Cheap Creek, Sweet Nell Creek, Safe Creek, Lost Creek, Dark Creek, Connors Creek, Rabbit Creek, Lodore Creek, Cascade Creek, Fleming Creek, Brewster Creek, Torrance Creek, Brae Creek, Plover Creek
  - right: Clumsy Creek, Swift Creek, Crook Creek, Shell Creek, Dredge Creek, Dun Creek, Dukes Creek, Lily Creek, Pansy Creek, Talent Creek, Shale Creek, Slip Creek

The Wills River is a river of the southern West Coast region of New Zealand's South Island. It flows west to reach the Haast River 10 kilometres north of the Haast Pass.

The river was named by Julius von Haast when he searched for a crossing from Otago to the West Coast. It is named for William John Wills of the Burke and Wills expedition. The nearby Burke River is named for Robert O'Hara Burke.

== See also ==
- List of rivers of New Zealand
