= Burke River (New Zealand) =

River in New Zealand

- Route of the Burke River
- Mouth of the Burke River Burke River (New Zealand) (New Zealand)
- Etymology: Named after Robert O'Hara Burke

Location
- Country: New Zealand
- Region: West Coast Region
- District: Westland
- Protected area: Mount Aspiring National Park

Physical characteristics
- Source: Confluence of Branch Creek and Hope Creek
  - coordinates: 44.0434°S 169.2193°E
- Mouth
  - location: Haast River
  - coordinates: 44°01′32″S 169°21′43″E
  - elevation: 95 m (312 ft)
- Length: 19 kilometres (12 mi)

Basin features
- Progression: Burke River → Haast River → Tasman Sea
- Tributaries
  - left: Tumbling Water, Crazy Cataract, Gabble Brook, Cowan Creek, Expected Brook, Plover Stream, Brisk Water, The Twirligig, Yestev Creek, Strachan Creek, Bonny Stream
  - right: Upper Creek, Clear Creek, Howe Creek, Detour Rivulet, Restless Torrent, Hidden Rivulet, Raving Torrent
- Waterfalls: Churn Rapids

The Burke River is a river of New Zealand's South Island, located in Mount Aspiring National Park. It flows east for 19 kilometres (12 mi) from close to the Mueller Pass, reaching the Haast River 10 kilometres (6 mi) south of the Haast Pass.

The river was named by Julius von Haast when he searched for a crossing from Otago to the West Coast. It is named for Robert O'Hara Burke of the Burke and Wills expedition. The nearby Wills River is named for William John Wills.

== See also ==
- List of rivers of New Zealand
