= Thunder Creek Falls =

Waterfall in Haast Pass, New Zealand

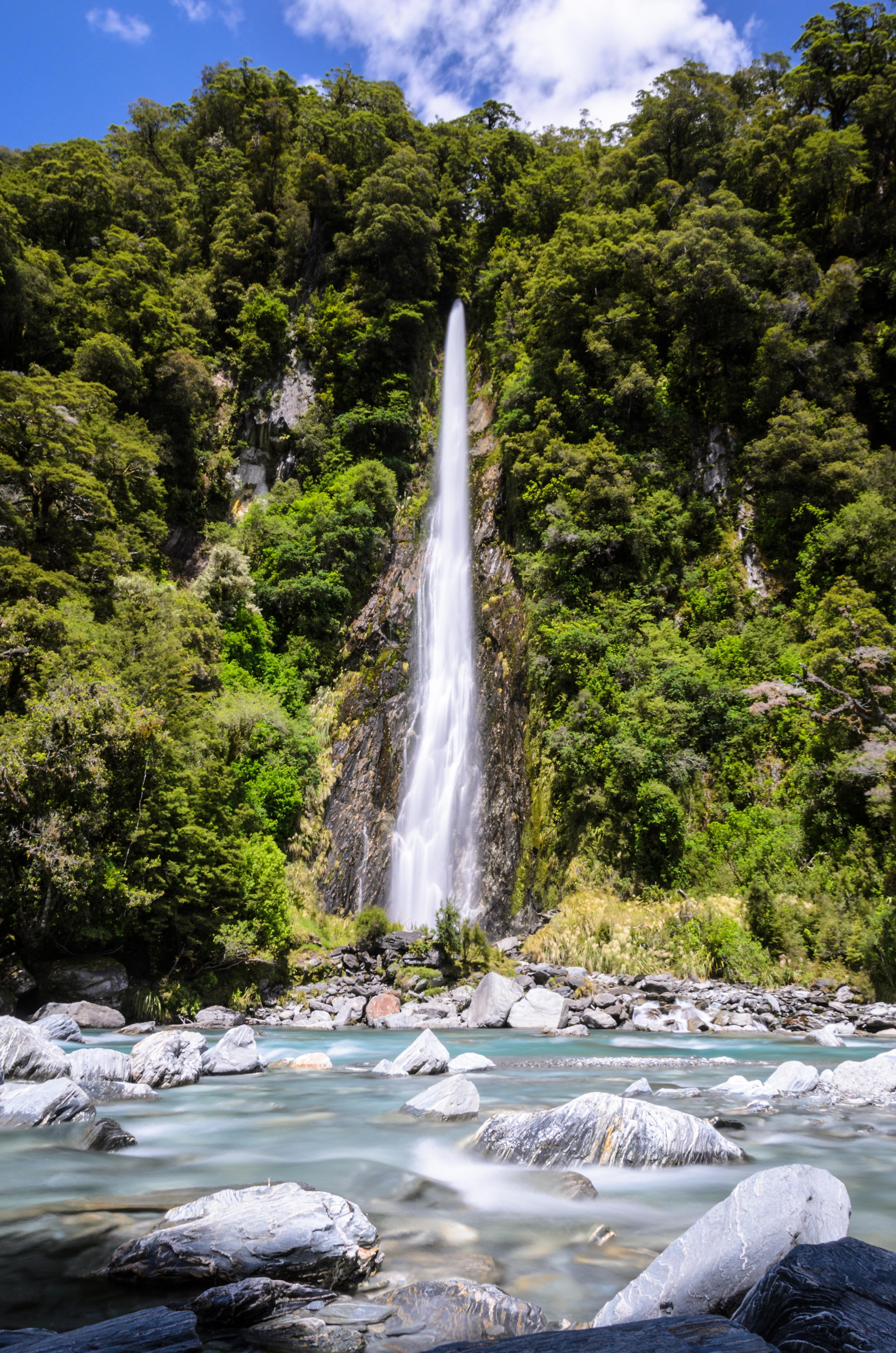
- Interactive map of Thunder Creek Falls
- Location: Mount Aspiring National Park, New Zealand
- Coordinates: 44°02′17″S 169°21′55″E
- Total height: 28 metres (92 ft)
- Watercourse: Thunder Creek

Thunder Creek Falls is a waterfall in Mount Aspiring National Park, Westland District, New Zealand. It is located in the Haast River valley, around 52 kilometres (32 mi) inland from Haast, near the Gates of Haast bridge on State Highway 6. The falls are about 28 metres (92 ft) high (Note: Several sources report the height as 96 m, but this inconsistent with the Department of Conservation sources, and the figure of 90 ft reported in The Press of 29 June 1972.) and the base is at an elevation of around 120 metres (390 ft) where it flows into the Haast River.

The waterfall is the outlet of Thunder Creek, draining from a hanging valley created by erosion caused by the former Haast glacier and the Haast River. Over a period of around 14,000 years, the Haast River has formed a canyon, eroding the bedrock down by approximately the 28 m height of the falls.

== Viewing platform ==
A viewing platform is accessible via a 200-metre-return (220 yd) walk on a sealed track from the carpark on State Highway 6. The track to the viewing platform passes through silver beech and kāmahi forest.

== Vegetation ==
The vegetation in this area has silver beech (Nothofagus menziesii) as the main canopy tree, but there are also podocarps including miro (Prumnopitys ferruginea), mataī (Prumnopitys taxifolia), and rimu (Dacrydium cupressinum). Beneath the canopy there is a variety of broadleaf trees including kāmahi (Weinmannia racemosa), māhoe (Melicytus ramiflorus), wineberry (Aristotelia serrata) and patē (Schefflera digitata). There are many species of fern including the soft tree fern (Dicksonia antarctica) and smaller ferns including crown fern (Lomaria discolor) and hound's tongue fern (Cynoglossum officinale). There are also multiple species of Coprosma, including C. robusta (karamū), Coprosma ciliata, and Coprosma rotundifolia.

== See also ==
- List of waterfalls
- List of waterfalls in New Zealand
