= Roaring Billy Falls =

Waterfall in Haast Pass, New Zealand

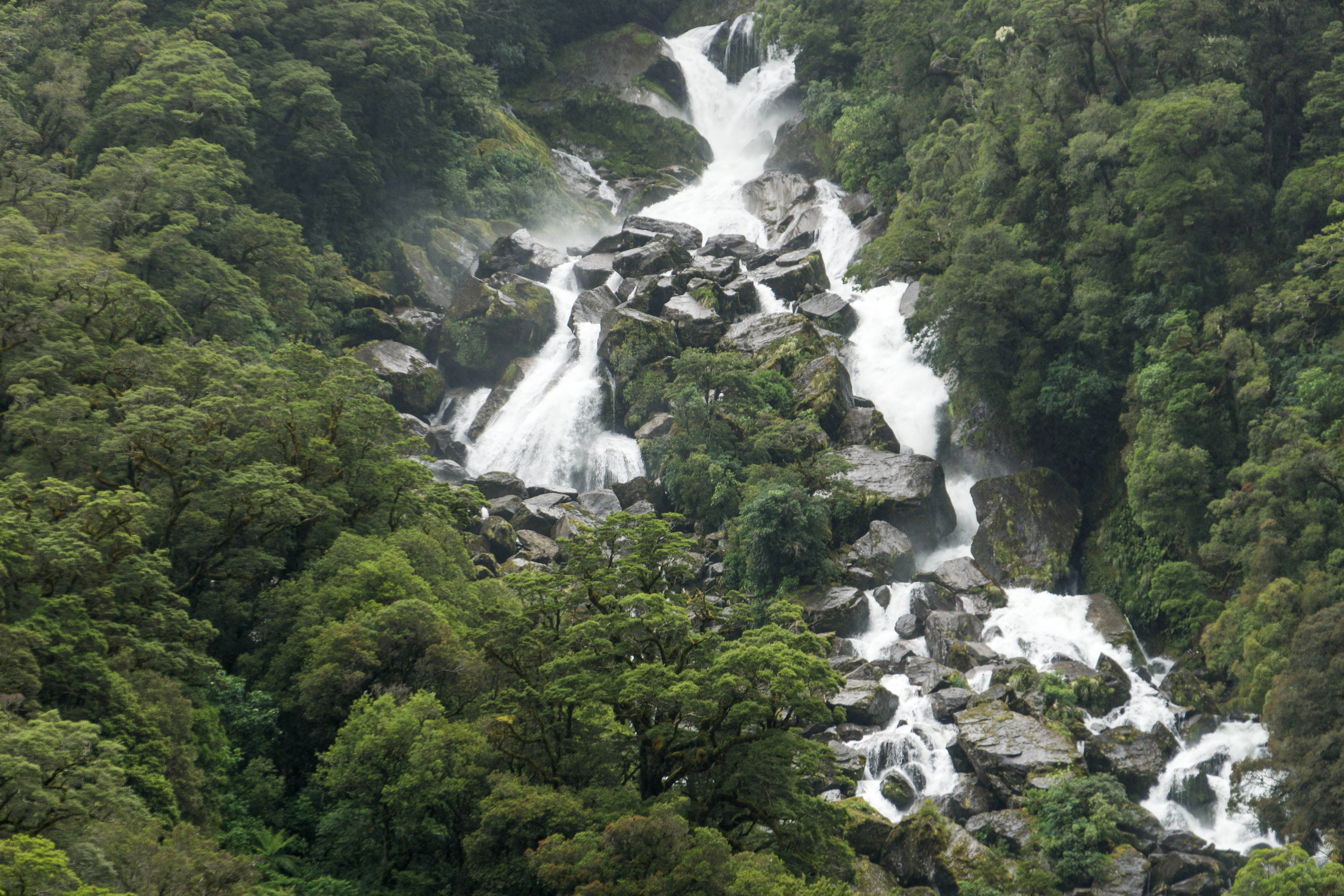
- Interactive map of Roaring Billy Falls
- Location: Mount Aspiring National Park, New Zealand
- Coordinates: 43°55′59″S 169°17′40″E
- Type: Cascade
- Total height: 30 metres (98 ft)
- Watercourse: The Roaring Billy

Roaring Billy Falls is a waterfall in Mount Aspiring National Park, Westland District, New Zealand. It is located in the Haast River valley, around 30 km (19 mi) inland from Haast, near Eighteen Mile Bluff on State Highway 6. The falls are a 30-metre-high (98 ft) cascade on The Roaring Billy stream. The bottom of the cascade is at an elevation of around 80 metres (262 ft) where it flows into the Haast River.

== Viewing point and walkway ==
A viewing point is accessible via a one-kilometre-return (0.62 mi) walkway from the carpark on State Highway 6. The walkway is a gravel and boardwalk path that passes through silver beech and podocarp forest to the gravel bed of the Haast River where there is a view of the falls on the opposite side of the river. The forest understory along the walk has a dense growth of tree ferns.

== Vegetation ==
The path to the viewing point passes through forest on a fertile alluvial terrace with a wide diversity of rainforest plants.

The canopy consists of silver beech (Nothofagus menziesii), southern rātā (Metrosideros umbellata) and kāmahi (Weinmannia racemosa), and a wide range of podocarps including miro (Prumnopitys ferruginea), mataī (Prumnopitys taxifolia), kahikatea (Dacrycarpus dacrydioides), rimu (Dacrydium cupressinum) and Hall's tōtara (Podocarpus laetus). Beneath the canopy there is māhoe (Melicytus ramiflorus), patē (Schefflera digitata), mountain horopito (Pseudowintera colorata), wineberry (Aristotelia serrata), tree fuchsia (Fuchsia excorticata) and Coprosma rotundifolia.

Tree ferns are abundant, mostly the soft tree fern (Dicksonia antarctica) and wheki - the rough tree fern (Dicksonia squarrosa). There are also many smaller ferns including crown fern (Lomaria discolor), hound's tongue fern (Cynoglossum officinale), water fern (Ceratopteris thalictroides), prickly shield fern (Polystichum vestitum), drooping spleenwort (Asplenium flaccidum), creek fern (Cranfillia fluviatilis), comb fern (Schizaea fistulosa), crepe fern (Leptopteris hymenophylloides), Colenso's hard fern (or waterfall fern) (Austroblechnum colensoi) and common strap fern (Notogrammitis billardierei). Some filmy ferns are also present.

== See also ==
- List of waterfalls
- List of waterfalls in New Zealand
