= Pātuki =

New Zealand Māori leader, whaler, goldminer and storekeeper

Tōpi Pātuki (died 28 September 1900), baptised as Hoani Raena (John Reynold), was a New Zealand Māori leader, whaler, goldminer and storekeeper. Of Māori descent, he identified with the Kāti Māmoe iwi. He was born in Waipahi, West Otago, New Zealand as early as 1810 or as late as 1820. He is said to have fired the shot that killed Te Pūoho-o-te-rangi, who had come to Southland to fight Ngāi Tahu.
