= Gates of Haast =

Gorge in New Zealand

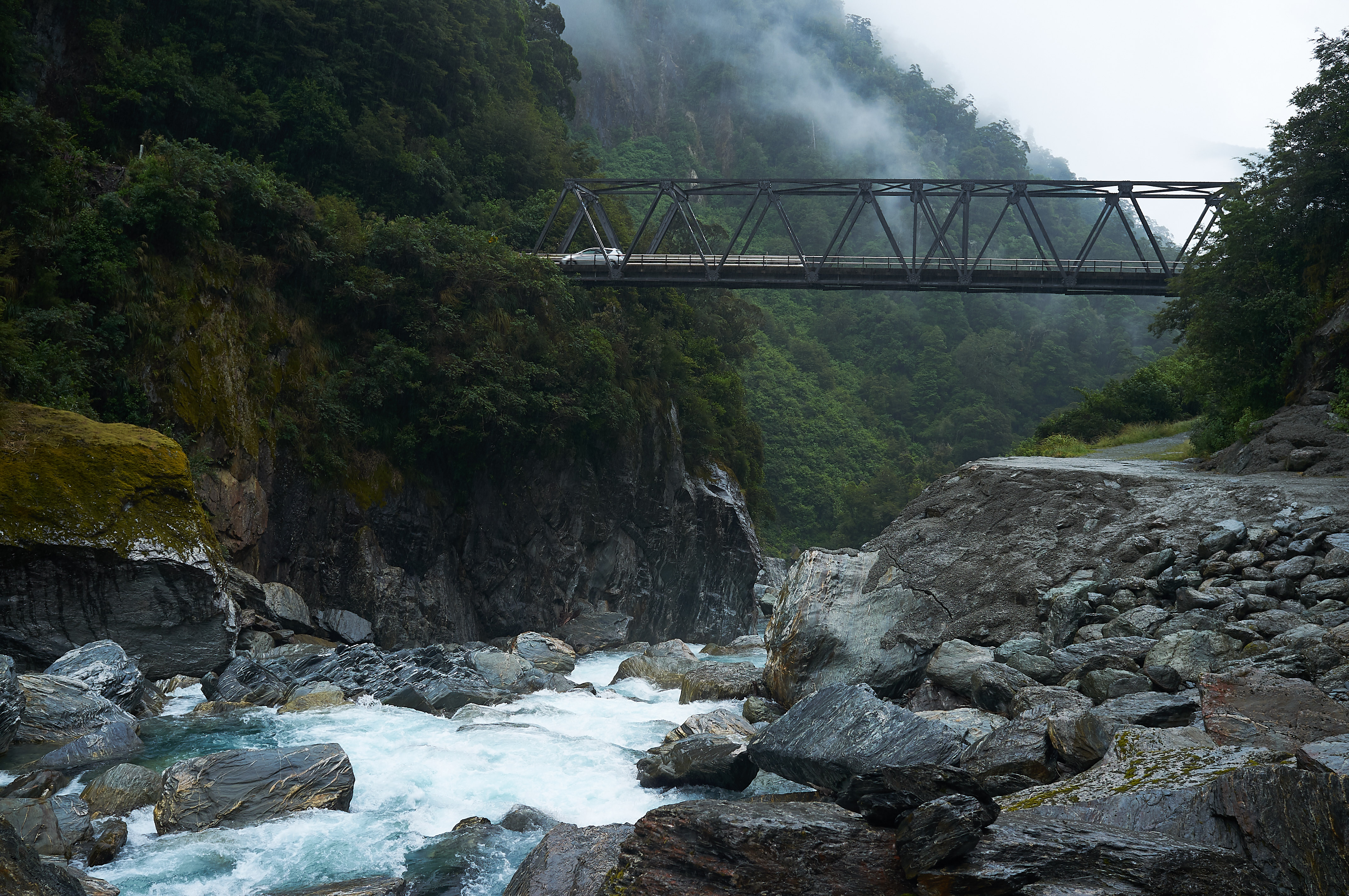
- Gates of Haast gorge and bridge

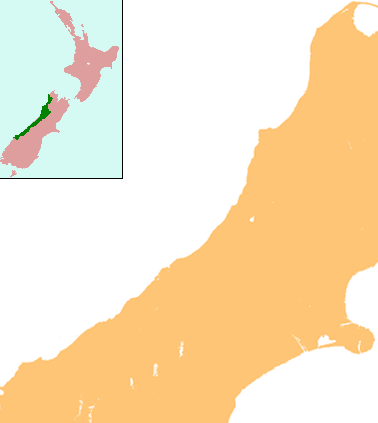
- Location within West Coast
- Long-axis direction: East-West

Geography
- Coordinates: 44°02′22.5″S 169°22′47″E
- Traversed by: State Highway 6
- Interactive map of Gates of Haast

The Gates of Haast is a gorge on the Haast River in Mount Aspiring National Park in the South Island of New Zealand. It is located 56 kilometres (35 mi) inland by road from the township of Haast and 9 kilometres (5.6 mi) from the summit of Haast Pass. The Gates of Haast has sheer rock cliffs above a steep cascade in the Haast River. State Highway 6 crosses the gorge on a single-lane Callender-Hamilton steel truss bridge.

== History ==
The Haast Pass was a route used by Māori in pre-European times. In 1863, the route was used by the explorer and geologist Julius von Haast along with Charles Cameron. By 1880, a packhorse track had been constructed over the pass; however, work to form a road across the pass did not start until 1929 when work began at Lake Hāwea. A further phase commenced from the east at Makarora in 1936, and proceeded as far as the Gates of Haast, but was then halted for several years because of diversion of resources to the Second World War. Further work on the western side of the Gates of Haast did not begin again until 1946. Progress was slow, and by 1955, there was still 10 miles of roadway to be formed on the western side of the gorge.

The Haast Pass road between Otago and southern Westland was officially opened in November 1960, but it was announced that a complete road closure would be required in the New Year to replace the existing temporary Bailey bridge at Gates of Haast with a permanent structure. The permanent replacement was a modular pre-fabricated Callender-Hamilton steel truss bridge. Road closures to replace the existing Bailey bridge commenced after Easter 1961. In May 1961, morning and afternoon road closures were implemented for the construction work, and maximum weight and speed limits were imposed. In the final stages of the construction, the Bailey bridge was closed, allowing only pedestrians to cross. During this period, supplies for the Haast township, normally delivered via the road from Cromwell in Otago had to be hand-carried across a catwalk over the river from one truck on the Otago side to another truck on the West Coast side. In September 1961, the new Callender-Hamilton bridge was opened, after 3 months of total road closure.

Work was still required to complete the remaining sections of the road between Haast and Paringa to connect with the rest of the West Coast. The official opening of the Haast Highway as a complete route was held on 6 November 1965.

In February 1979, the National Roads Board reported that severe floods had caused damage under and around the Gates of Haast bridge that would cost an estimated $0.5 million to repair.

In December 1979, the Ministry of Works and Development advised that exceptionally high flood levels in the Haast River had caused significant damage to the highway in the vicinity of the Gates of Haast Bridge. Heavy erosion had occurred, removing most of the road protection works. Boulders weighing an estimated 500 tonnes had moved or disappeared. The bridge was declared unsafe for traffic, closing State Highway 6 across the pass and causing major impacts on West Coast tourism. The Ministry of Works reported that the bridge foundations of the Haast end had been almost completely undermined. Urgent temporary support measures were put in place to prevent the bridge from collapsing if the foundations failed. Temporary repairs were made to allow the bridge to be re-opened for Christmas holiday traffic, but during day-times only and with a weight restriction. Passengers on tourist buses were required to disembark and walk across the bridge, to lessen the load. It was estimated that full repairs to the bridge would take six months.

In 2010, a proposal was announced for a new bridge and road re-alignment at Gates of Haast. The proposed new bridge would be two-lane and have an estimated cost of $28 million. The proposal was intended to mitigate some of the hazards of slips, erosion and heavy vehicle impact that are a threat to the existing bridge. However, in 2014, these plans were shelved, after three years of investigations concluded that a new bridge could not be engineered to withstand a major landslide or washout that are inherent risks in this section of State Highway 6.
