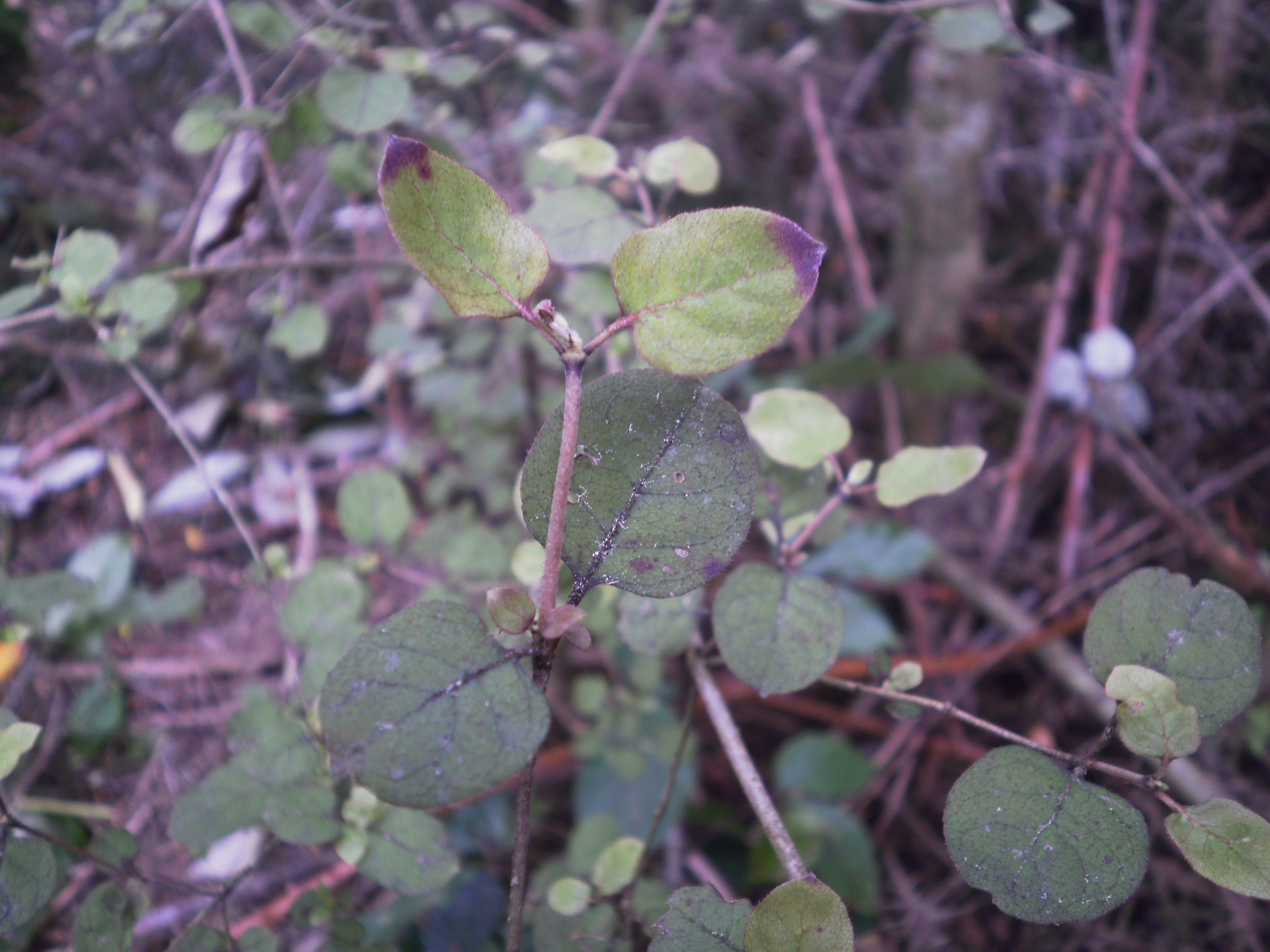

Scientific classification
- Kingdom: Plantae
- Clade: Embryophytes
- Clade: Tracheophytes
- Clade: Spermatophytes
- Clade: Angiosperms
- Clade: Eudicots
- Clade: Asterids
- Order: Gentianales
- Family: Rubiaceae
- Genus: Coprosma
- Species: C. rotundifolia

Binomial name
- Coprosma rotundifolia A.Cunn.

= Coprosma rotundifolia =

Species of flowering plant

Coprosma rotundifolia is a native forest shrub of New Zealand found on the North, South, and Stewart Islands.

== Description ==
Coprosma rotundifolia can grow to a large bushy shrub of up to 6 metres (20 ft) tall. It has small, wide-angled divaricated branches. The branches bear small, tapered leaves 15–25 millimetres (0.59–0.98 in) to 10–20 millimetres (0.39–0.79 in) that end in a sharp tip. The leaves are opposite each other. At the base of the leaf, the stalk is subtended by a small, tooth-like stipule that is blunt and rounded at the base.

The leaves are mainly pale green, often with purple blotches, and covered in short to long soft hairs, particularly on the edges of the leaf. The lamina is very thin with veins that are visible on both sides of the leaf. Domatia are present on the surface of leaves between veins, on the midrib, and near the edges on the underside of the leaf.

It produces orange to red fruit. This fruit is about 4–5 millimetres (0.16–0.20 in) in diameter and grows on short branches separate from other branches supporting foliage. Flowers occur in clusters between September and November.

== Etymology ==
The Māori name for the small-leaved, divaricating forms of coprosma is mikimiki. The word Coprosma originates from the Greek kopros meaning "dung" and osme meaning "odour", because some Coprosma species smell like dung. The word rotundifolia originates from two Latin words: rotundus meaning "round" and folium meaning "leaf".

== Range ==
C. rotundifolia is one of about 60 species of Coprosma found in New Zealand in the North Island from Kaitaia south, and throughout the South and Stewart Islands.

== Habitat ==
It occurs from lowland to montane habitats, particularly in alluvial soils and damp lowland forests. It is most common in riparian forest and scrubland. It has also been planted as a horticultural plant and may be encountered in a wide range of habitats. Plants are hardy, fast-growing and low-maintenance, but require winter pruning. Typically, they are found in ornamental gardens for their unique form.

It grows best in moist, well-drained, fertile soil. The plant also thrives in soils with higher calcium carbonate levels, such as a soil which is limestone rich.

== Life cycle ==
C. rotundifolia produces flowers between September and November in axillary clusters of 2–4. Female and male flowers are produced on separate trees.

Male flowers do not have a calyx. The corolla is funnel-shaped, with the lobes widest at the base and ovate with a sharp tip furthest from the tube.

The fruit is orange to red. Fruits are a globe-shaped drupe formed on short branches 4–5 mm in diameter. The fruit contains two seeds. These are predominantly dispersed by birds that eat the fruit. The seeds germinate in favourable conditions such as soils with higher levels of calcium carbonate, and can grow up to a small tree.

== Herbivores ==
C. rotundifolia is currently not classified as threatened. Common herbivores include introduced grazers such as possums, rats, deer and goats. Other pests include foliage invertebrates and leaf pathogens.
