= Te Pūoho =

New Zealand Māori leader (died 1836 or 1837)

Te Pūoho-o-te-rangi (died 1836 or 1837), also known as Te Pūoho-ki-te-rangi, was a notable New Zealand Māori leader, identified with the Ngāti Tama and Ngāti Toa iwi. Te Pūoho was born in Poutama, Taranaki, New Zealand, possibly in the late eighteenth century. Late in his life, he moved to the South Island and settled at Parapara.

In 1836, Te Pūoho led a 100-person war party (taua), armed with muskets, down the West Coast and over the Haast Pass / Tioripatea: they fell on the Ngāi Tahu encampment between Lake Wānaka and Lake Hāwea, capturing ten people and killing and eating two children. Some of the Ngāi Tahu fled down the Waitaki River to the coast; Te Pūoho took his captives over the Crown Range to Lake Wakatipu and thence to Southland where he was killed and his war party destroyed by the southern Ngāi Tahu leader Tūhawaiki. Pātuki is said to have fired the shot that killed Te Pūoho.
