= Haast Pass =

Mountain pass in New Zealand

Haast Pass / Tioripatea
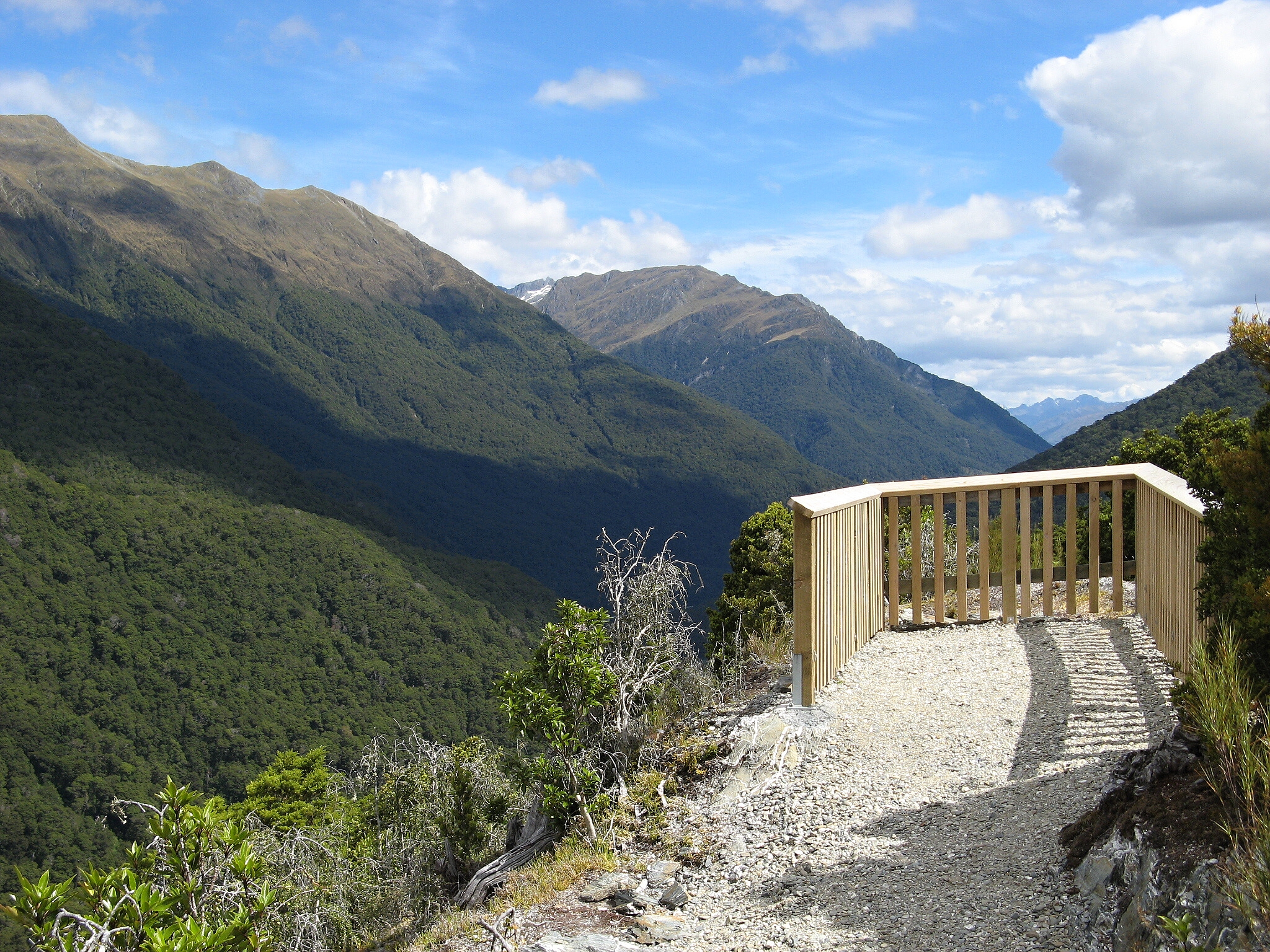
- Lookout point above the summit

- Location within New Zealand
- Elevation: 562 metres (1,844 ft)
- Traversed by: State Highway 6

Third Approach
- Location: West Coast / Otago, New Zealand
- Range: Southern Alps
- Coordinates: 44°06′19″S 169°21′22″E

Haast Pass / Tioripatea is a mountain pass in the Southern Alps of the South Island of New Zealand. Māori used the pass in pre-European times.

The pass takes its name from Julius von Haast, a 19th-century explorer who also served as provincial geologist for the provincial government of Canterbury. Following the passage of the Ngāi Tahu Claims Settlement Act 1998, the name of the pass was officially altered to Haast Pass / Tioripatea. The pass lies within the limits of Mount Aspiring National Park and forms part of the boundary between the Otago and West Coast regions.

The Haast Pass is one of the three passes where a road crosses over the Southern Alps – alongside the Lewis Pass and Arthur's Pass, although the Homer Tunnel passes under the Main Divide. The Haast Pass rises to a height of 562 metres (1,844 ft) above sea level at the saddle between the valleys of the Haast and Makarora Rivers. As such, it is the lowest of the passes traversing the Southern Alps.

The route through Haast Pass (now State Highway 6) was converted from a rough track to a formed road that reached the Haast township in 1960, but was not linked with the rest of the West Coast until 1965.

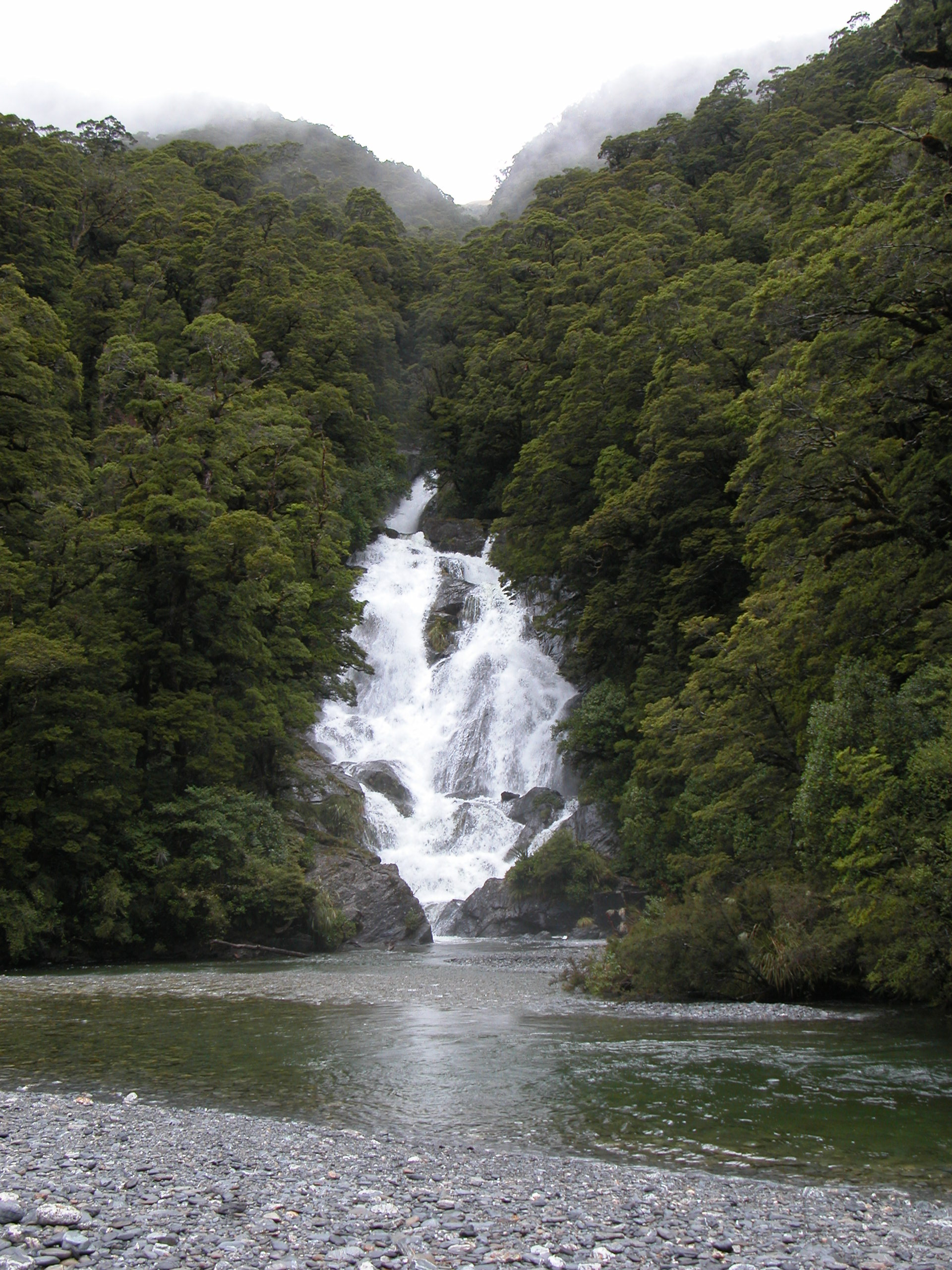
Fantail Falls in Haast Pass

No settlements exist on the Haast Pass road between Haast and Makarora. The road passes through predominantly unmodified beech forest. Between the township of Haast and the summit of the pass, State Highway 6 follows the route of the Haast River, and provides access and viewing points for several notable waterfalls including (west-to-east): Roaring Billy Falls, Thunder Creek Falls, and Fantail Falls.

== History ==
Ngāi Tahu used the pass to cross from Lake Wānaka to the West Coast. At the time of European exploration, it was notorious for its use in 1835 by a large war party led by Te Pūoho-o-te-rangi; a surprise crossing enabled Te Pūoho to ambush seasonal villages in the Makarora valley.

Europeans first learnt of the pass when Huruhuru drew a map for the explorer Edward Shortland in 1844. The first European ascent was from the Wānaka side in March 1861, when the exploring survey John Holland Baker, seeking new sheep country, looked down from the saddle towards the West Coast. Charles Cameron, a gold prospector, claimed to have been the first European to cross to the coast in 1863. However he was widely believed to have only got to the upper reaches of the Haast River / Awarua. The honour of first official crossing was claimed by Julius Haast, Canterbury's provincial geologist, who led a five-man expedition in January 1863. He named the Haast River after himself, "directed, so he said, by his provincial superindendent", and returned to Lake Wānaka "nearly shoeless" after six weeks.

By 1880, there was a good packhorse track across the pass, but work to form a road across the pass did not commence until 1929 when work began at Lake Hāwea. A further phase commenced from the east at Makarora in 1936, and proceeded as far as the Gates of Haast, but was then halted for several years because of diversion of resources to the Second World War. Further work on the western side of the Gates of Haast did not begin again until 1946. Progress was slow, and by 1955, there was still 10 miles of roadway to be formed on the western side of the gorge.

The Haast Pass road between Otago and southern Westland was officially opened in November 1960, but it was announced that a complete road closure would be required in the New Year to replace the existing temporary Bailey bridge at Gates of Haast with a permanent structure. In September 1961, the new Callender-Hamilton bridge was opened, after 3 months of total road closure. During this period, supplies for the Haast township, normally delivered via the road from Cromwell in Otago had to be hand-carried across a catwalk over the river from one truck on the Otago side to another truck on the West Coast side.

The official opening of the entire Haast Highway was held on 6 November 1965, following the completion of the last 50 kilometres (31 mi) section between Haast and Paringa. However, a chipseal surface on the entire route was not completed until 1995.

In the early 20th century, a railway from the West Coast through the pass to Otago was suggested by local MP Tom Seddon; it would have linked the Ross Branch with the Otago Central Railway, which then terminated in Omakau. However, the line never came to fruition; the Otago Central Railway terminated in Cromwell and no railway was built south of Ross, just a lightly laid bush tramway to serve logging interests near Lake Ianthe.

== See also ==
- List of mountain passes#New Zealand
