= Haast River =

River of New Zealand

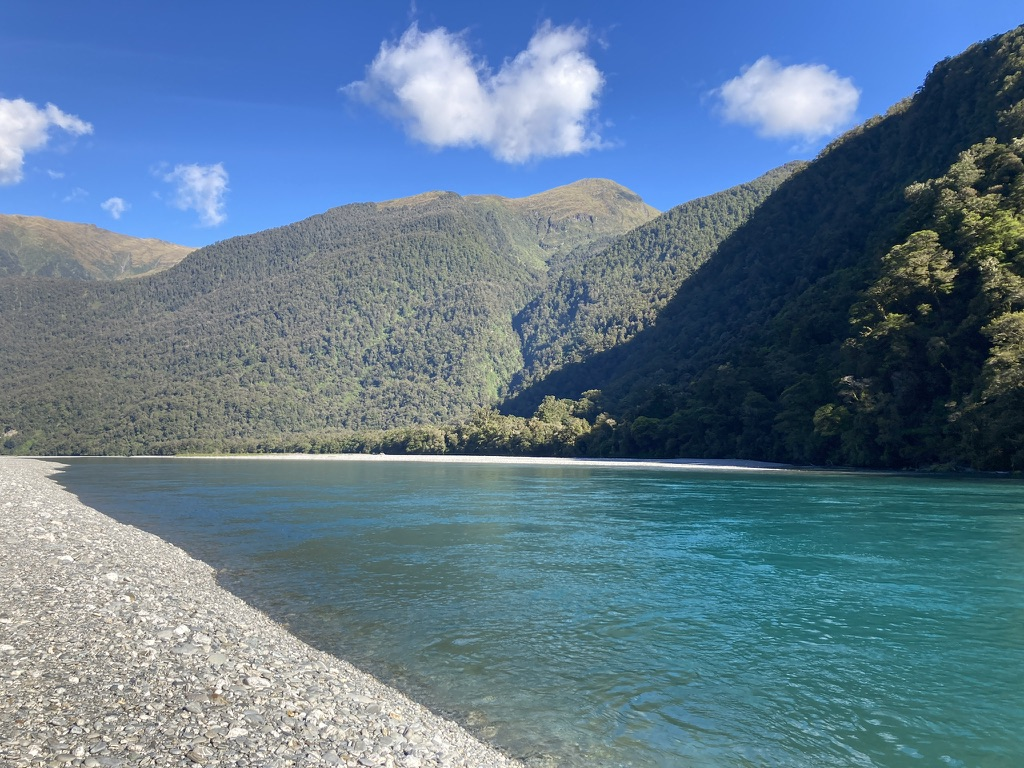
- Haast River near Roaring Billy Falls
- Route of the Haast River
- Mouth of the Haast River Haast River (New Zealand)
- Etymology: Named after Julius von Haast
- Native name: Awarua

Location
- Country: New Zealand
- Region: West Coast
- District: Westland

Physical characteristics
- Source: Haast Pass
  - coordinates: 44.1165°S 169.3862°E
- Mouth
  - location: Tasman Sea
  - coordinates: 43°49′57″S 169°02′15″E
- Length: 100 km (62 mi)

Basin features
- Progression: Haast River → Tasman Sea
- Tributaries
  - left: Cross Creek, Wilson Creek, Robinson Creek, Pyke Creek, Cutter Creek, Pipson Creek, Ford Creek, The Trickle, Thunder Creek, Hutchinson Creek, Burke River, Mather Creek, Muir Creek, Briar Creek, Moa Creek, Big Creek, Solitude Stream, Pivot Creek, Chelsea Creek, Evans Creek, Serpentine Creek, Douglas Creek, Macpherson Creek, Gout Creek, Mossy Creek, Orman Creek, Depot Creek, Cache Creek, Chink Creek, Roaring Swine Creek, Dancing Creek, Joes Creek, Glitter Burn, Harris Creek, Myrtle Creek, Greenstone Creek, Snapshot Creek, Grassy Creek, Crikey Creek
  - right: Zig Zag Creek, Fantail Creek, Shortcut Creek, Wills River, Patsy Creek, Surly Creek, Civil Creek, Landsborough River, Colin Creek, Debris Torrent, Cuttance Creek, The Roaring Billy, Neilson Creek, Brag Creek, Crow Creek, Cushat Creek, Thomas River, Gliding Creek, Jamieson Creek, Omimimi Creek
- Bridges: Gates of Haast Bridge, Haast Rive Bridge

The Haast River / Awarua is a river on the West Coast of the South Island of New Zealand. The Māori name for the river is Awarua. It drains the western watershed of the Haast Pass. The Haast River is 100 kilometres (62 mi) in length, and enters the Tasman Sea near Haast township. The river's main tributary is the Landsborough River.

== Toponomy ==
Julius von Haast named the river after himself, "directed, so he said, by his Provincial Superintendent". Von Haast explored a route from Otago to the West Coast that was long known to Māori; his four companions were William Young (a surveyor), Charles Håring (a retired sailor), William Francis Warner (later the proprietor of Warner's Hotel), and Robert Langley Holmes (later the Canterbury provincial meteorologist). They set out on 22 January 1863 and stood in the surf on 20 February.

== Geography ==
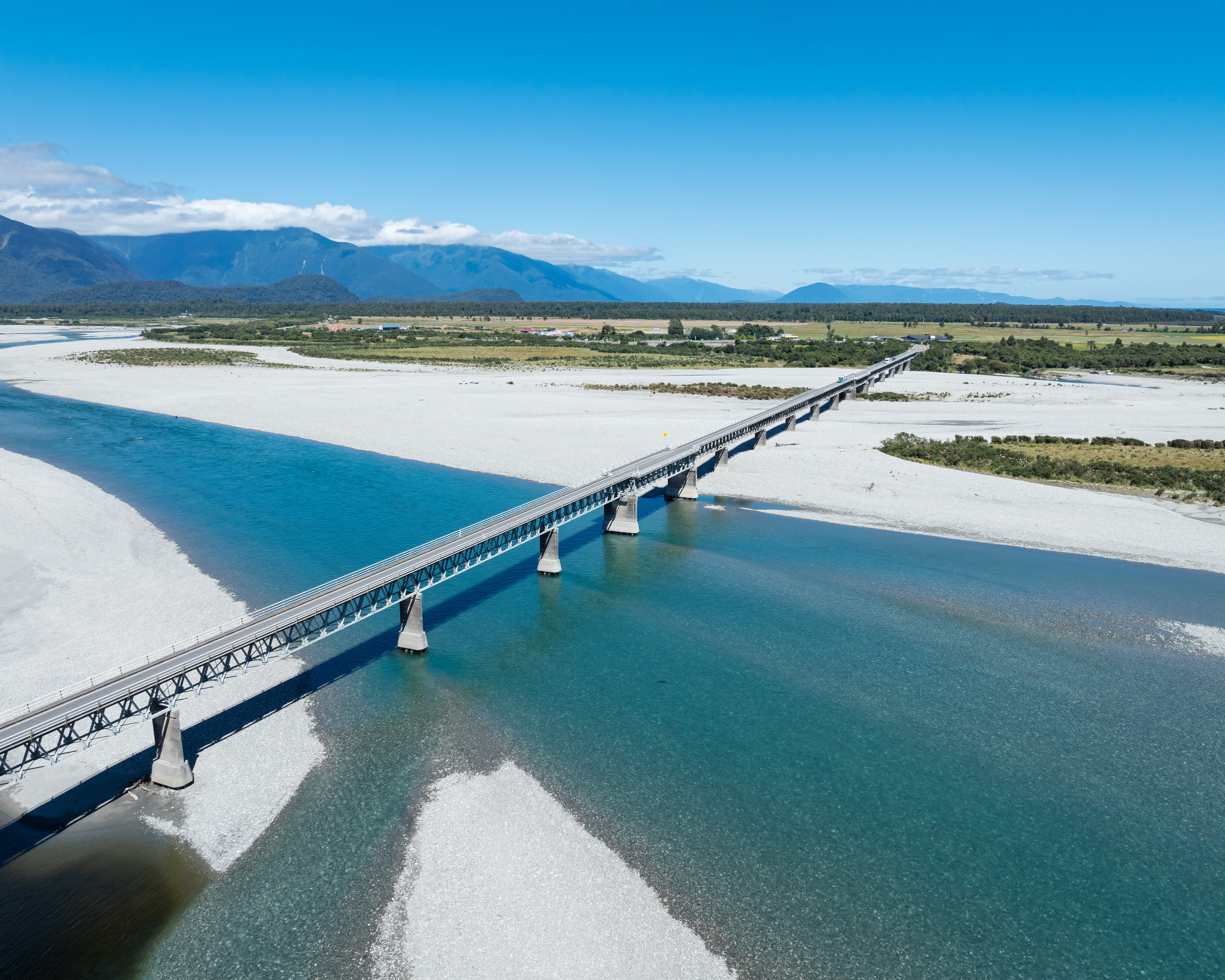
The 737m single-lane bridge over the Haast River

The river is set within the Te Wahipounamu World Heritage Site. The majority of the surrounding land is publicly owned and administered by the Department of Conservation. The grassy flats on the lower reaches are grazed by cattle owned by the local farmers. Tourism operators offer jetboat tours on the river.

State Highway 6 follows virtually the complete length of the river. From near Haast Pass, the state highway is located on the river's true left. It switches to the true right at the Gates of Haast Bridge. At Pleasant Flat, where the valley widens out, the state highway crosses back to the true left. The final bridge is near the coast, just after the turnoff to the Haast township. At 737 metres (2,418 ft) it is the longest one-lane road bridge in New Zealand, and the 7th longest New Zealand bridge overall.

=== The Haast plain ===
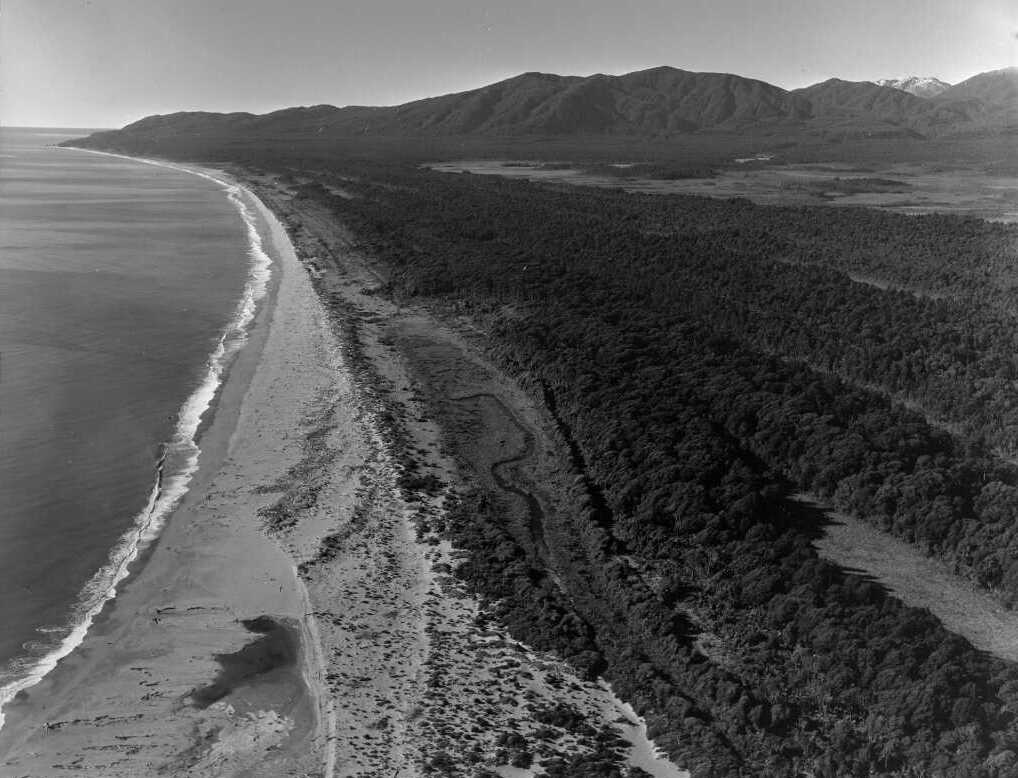
Haast coastline - showing parallel lines of dunes and swales

The Haast plain extends 50 km (31 mi) from Ship Creek to Jackson Bay / Okahu. The plain has an unusual landform, with long parallel lines of low hills with narrow swales in between. In some places, the plain is 10 km (6.2 mi) wide, with six rows of dunes and swales. The landform results from the combined effects of sediment carried to the coast by six large rivers, longshore drift and periodic seismic uplifts. The rivers discharging into the Tasman sea in this region of coastline drain from large catchment areas in the Southern Alps, where there is high rainfall and the mountains have high rates of erosion. The suspended sediment yield of the Arawhata River has been reported as 7.18 Mt/yr, and the Haast River as 5.93 Mt/yr. The total estimated suspended sediment yield from rivers in South Westland is over 50 Mt/yr. Longshore drift leads to much of this sediment being deposited along the Haast coastline, forming dunes. The Alpine Fault runs along the inland edge of the plain, and the entire area is subject to tectonic uplift during major seismic events. Following a major uplift, existing dunes are no longer exposed to the action of the sea, and new dunes begin to form. This creates a longitudinal pattern of dunes with low-lying wetlands in between. The coastal plain is approximately 6,000 years old. The dunes close to the current shoreline have little vegetation, but the older dunes further inland are forested with tall podocarps. The swales contain wetland lakes, pakihi and kahikatea swamp forests.

== See also ==
- Roaring Billy Falls
- Thunder Creek Falls
- Fantail Falls
