= Haast, New Zealand =

Town in the South Island of New Zealand

Haast
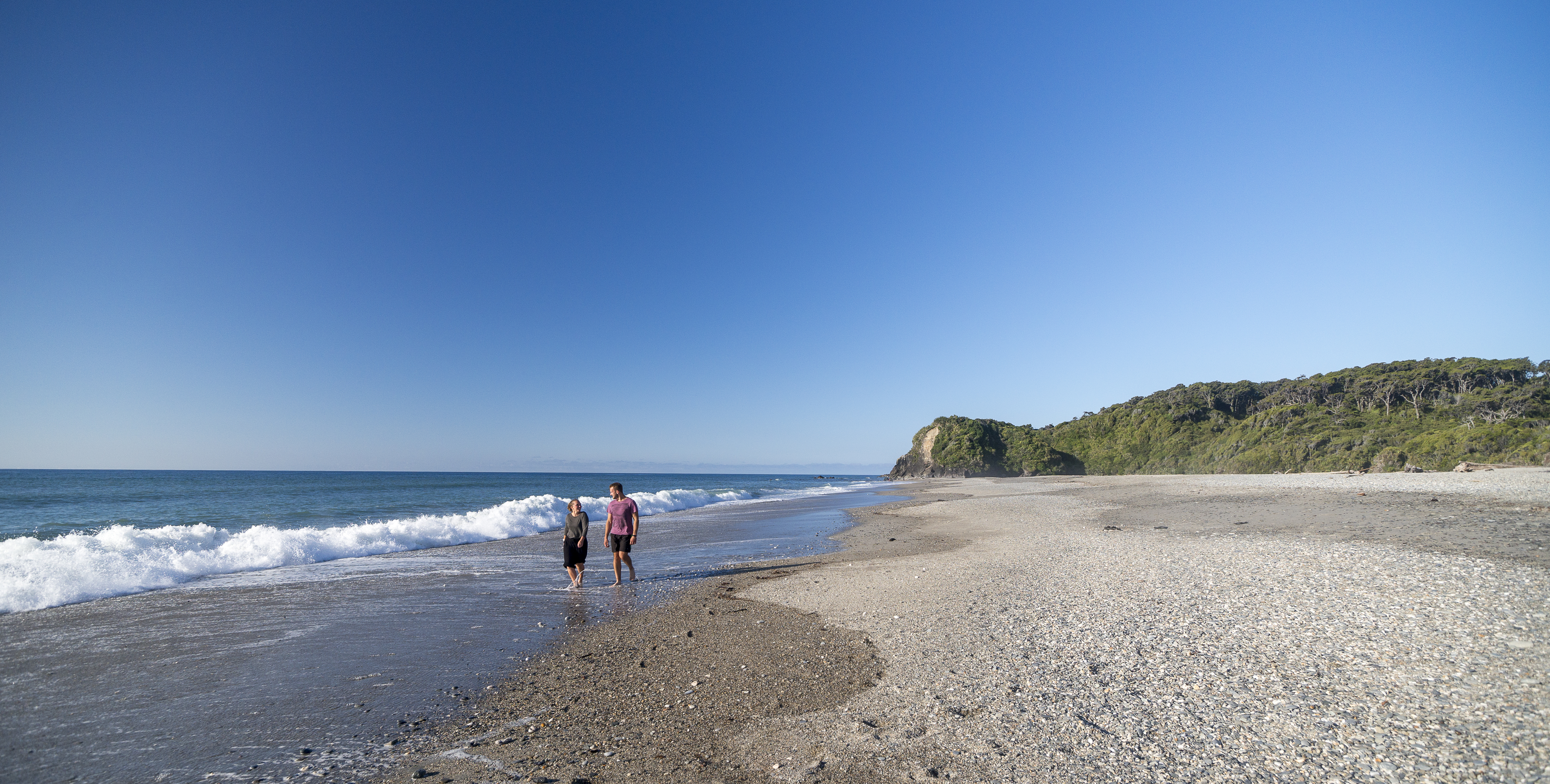
- Interactive map of Haast
- Coordinates: 43°52′52″S 169°2′32″E
- Country: New Zealand
- Region: West Coast
- District: Westland District
- Ward: Southern
- Electorates: West Coast-Tasman; Te Tai Tonga

Government
  - Territorial Authority: Westland District Council
  - Regional council: West Coast Regional Council
  - Mayor of Westland: Helen Lash
  - West Coast-Tasman MP: Maureen Pugh
  - Te Tai Tonga MP: Tākuta Ferris

Area
  - Total: 0.57 km^{2} (0.22 sq mi)

Population (June 2025)
  - Total: 100
  - Density: 180/km^{2} (450/sq mi)
- Time zone: UTC+12 (NZST)
  - Summer (DST): UTC+13 (NZDT)
- Postcode: 7886
- Area code: 03
- Local iwi: Ngāi Tahu

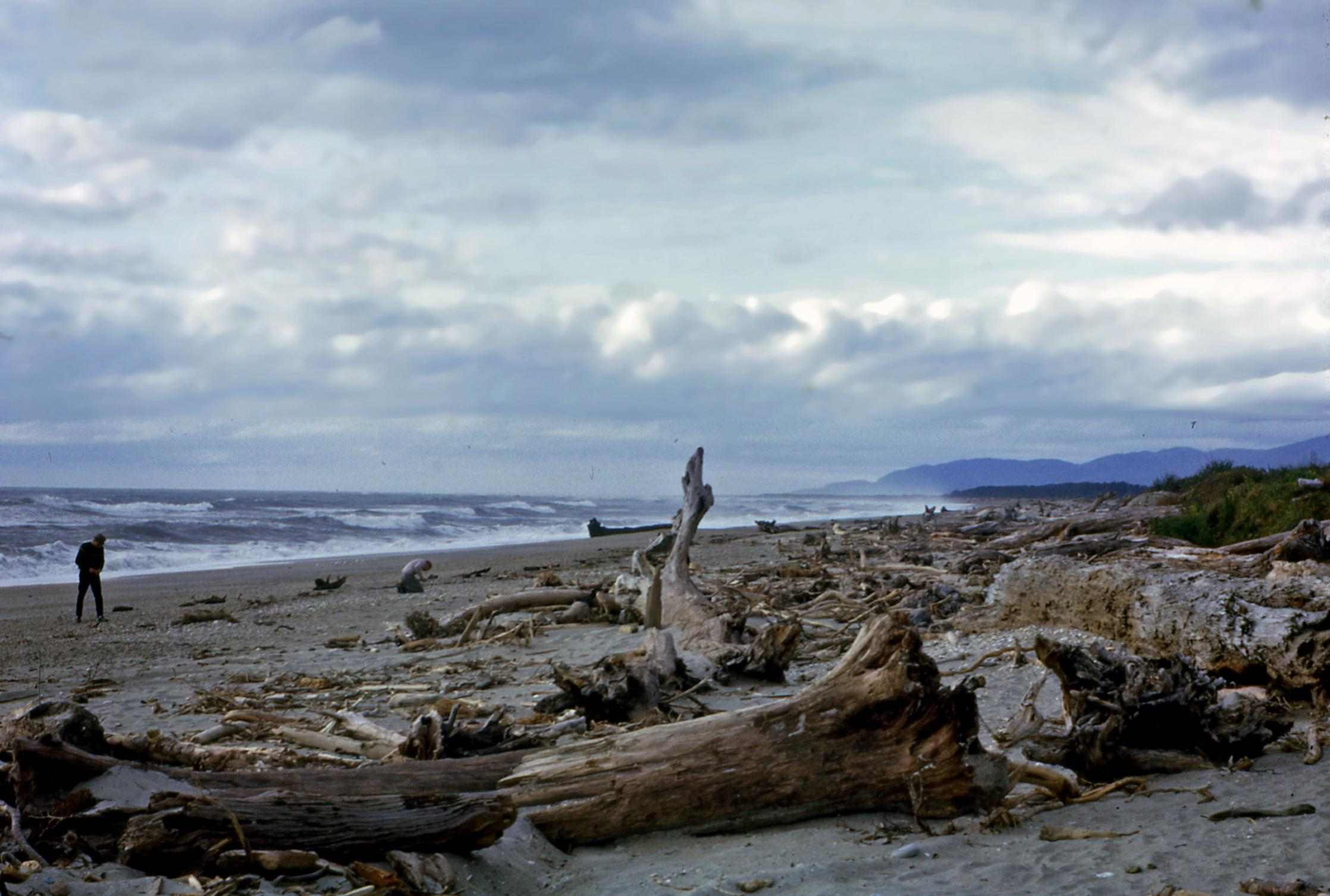
Haast Beach in 1968

Haast is a small town in the Westland District on the West Coast of New Zealand's South Island. The township is beside the Haast River, 3 kilometres (2 mi) south of Haast Junction, on State Highway 6. The Haast region is in Te Wahipounamu – The South West New Zealand World Heritage, a UNESCO World Heritage Site designated in 1990.

== Toponymy ==
The township, the major river that is close to the town, a gorge on the river and the pass across to the eastern side of the Southern Alps are all named after Julius von Haast, a Prussian-born geologist who travelled through the area in 1863. Although the prospector Charles Cameron is said to be the first European to ‘discover’ the pass, Haast was recognised by having the town named after him.

== History ==
The main Māori settlement in the area was the pā Ōkahu at the mouth of the Arawhata River.

The Haast area was extensively used by Māori as a key source of pounamu. Their main route from inland was called Tioripatea.

Ngāi Tahu occupation of the land was ended by attacks by North Island tribes. In 1836, the Ngāti Tama chief Te Pūoho led a 100-person war party, armed with muskets, down the West Coast and over the Haast Pass. He ambushed a Ngāi Tahu encampment between Lake Wānaka and Lake Hāwea, then went south past Lake Wakatipu. His raid ended in Southland where he was killed and his war party destroyed by the southern Ngāi Tahu leader Tūhawaiki.

European settlement of the area dates from the 1860s. The remoteness of the area initially limited access to seagoing vessels, with some rough tracks from the north and east.

Early European explorers searched for the Māori routes to cross from the eastern to the western sides of the South Island and back again, having learnt of the pass when Huruhuru drew a map for the explorer Edward Shortland in 1844. The first European ascent was from the Wānaka side in March 1861, when the exploring surveyor John Holland Baker, seeking new sheep country, looked down from the saddle towards the West Coast. Gold prospector Charles Cameron claimed to have made the first crossing to the coast in 1863 but was widely believed to have only got to the upper reaches of the Haast River / Awarua.

The first "official" crossing was by Julius von Haast, Canterbury's provincial geologist, who led a five-man expedition in January 1863. He named the Haast River after himself, "directed, so he said, by his provincial superindendent", and returned to Lake Wānaka "nearly shoeless" after six weeks.

Haast's party travelled up the headwaters of the Makarora River. On 23 January they reached the open, boggy summit of the pass, which was surrounded by beech forest. Haast made a watercolour which was used to illustrate a later report. The party then crossed the pass and travelled downstream to the coast, which they reached on 20 February.

The present Haast township was originally a New Zealand Ministry of Works road construction camp, which expanded into a permanent township when the opening of the Haast Pass in 1962 made the region more accessible. The road through the pass to Wānaka was upgraded in 1966.

In 1990, the Haast area was included as part of a UNESCO World Heritage Site, giving international recognition to a region of significant natural value, named as Te Wahipounamu – The South West New Zealand World Heritage Area.

== Geography ==
=== Setting ===
The Haast township is located on the Haast River, approximately 3 kilometres (2 mi) south of Haast Junction, on State Highway 6. The Haast River (Māori: Awarua) is 100 kilometres (62 mi) in length, and enters the Tasman Sea near the Haast township. It drains the western watershed of the Haast Pass, and passes through a gorge known as the Gates of Haast.

The New Zealand Department of Conservation operates a visitor centre in Haast Junction, on the southwest bank of the Haast River, immediately south of the Haast Bridge, at the junction of State Highway 6 and the Haast–Jackson Bay Road. The visitor centre offers a wide range of information about the surrounding area.

Lake Moeraki is 30 kilometres (19 mi) to the northeast, and the Haast Pass is 63 kilometres (39 mi) to the southeast by road. The settlement of Okuru is located on the coast 12 kilometres (7.5 mi) south-west of Haast.

The small settlement of Haast Beach is on the coast of the Tasman Sea, approximately 4 kilometres (2.5 mi) west southwest of Haast Junction, on the road to Jackson Bay.

=== Climate ===
Haast holds the distinction of being the wettest town in New Zealand.

Climate data for Haast (1991–2020 normals, extremes 1949–present)
| Month | Jan | Feb | Mar | Apr | May | Jun | Jul | Aug | Sep | Oct | Nov | Dec | Year |
|---|---|---|---|---|---|---|---|---|---|---|---|---|---|
| Record high °C (°F) | 29.4 (84.9) | 28.3 (82.9) | 27.9 (82.2) | 24.9 (76.8) | 21.5 (70.7) | 17.7 (63.9) | 18.9 (66.0) | 19.9 (67.8) | 23.7 (74.7) | 23.3 (73.9) | 28.0 (82.4) | 27.3 (81.1) | 29.4 (84.9) |
| Mean daily maximum °C (°F) | 18.4 (65.1) | 18.8 (65.8) | 18.0 (64.4) | 16.0 (60.8) | 14.0 (57.2) | 12.1 (53.8) | 11.7 (53.1) | 12.3 (54.1) | 13.2 (55.8) | 14.2 (57.6) | 15.4 (59.7) | 17.1 (62.8) | 15.1 (59.2) |
| Daily mean °C (°F) | 14.7 (58.5) | 15.0 (59.0) | 14.0 (57.2) | 12.3 (54.1) | 10.5 (50.9) | 8.4 (47.1) | 7.8 (46.0) | 8.4 (47.1) | 9.3 (48.7) | 10.3 (50.5) | 11.6 (52.9) | 13.4 (56.1) | 11.3 (52.3) |
| Mean daily minimum °C (°F) | 11.0 (51.8) | 11.3 (52.3) | 10.0 (50.0) | 8.5 (47.3) | 6.9 (44.4) | 4.7 (40.5) | 4.0 (39.2) | 4.5 (40.1) | 5.4 (41.7) | 6.5 (43.7) | 7.9 (46.2) | 9.7 (49.5) | 7.5 (45.6) |
| Record low °C (°F) | 3.0 (37.4) | 2.8 (37.0) | 0.7 (33.3) | −1.4 (29.5) | −2.7 (27.1) | −5.1 (22.8) | −3.7 (25.3) | −4.0 (24.8) | −2.0 (28.4) | −3.4 (25.9) | −0.4 (31.3) | 1.0 (33.8) | −5.1 (22.8) |
| Average rainfall mm (inches) | 255.7 (10.07) | 202.7 (7.98) | 246.2 (9.69) | 212.2 (8.35) | 267.8 (10.54) | 268.3 (10.56) | 251.5 (9.90) | 245.7 (9.67) | 299.5 (11.79) | 294.0 (11.57) | 240.9 (9.48) | 339.6 (13.37) | 3,124.1 (122.97) |
Source: NIWA

== Demographics ==
Haast town is described by Stats NZ as a rural settlement, covering 0.57 km^{2} (0.22 sq mi). It had an estimated population of 100 as of June 2025, with a population density of 175 people per km^{2}. The settlement is part of the larger Haast statistical area.

Historical population of the settlement
| Year | Pop. | ±% p.a. |
|---|---|---|
| 2006 | 63 | — |
| 2013 | 54 | −2.18% |
| 2018 | 84 | +9.24% |
| 2023 | 90 | +1.39% |

Haast had a population of 90 in the 2023 New Zealand census, an increase of 6 people (7.1%) since the 2018 census, and an increase of 36 people (66.7%) since the 2013 census. There were 54 males and 36 females in 45 dwellings. 6.7% of people identified as LGBTIQ+. The median age was 44.6 years (compared with 38.1 years nationally). There were 3 people (3.3%) aged under 15 years, 12 (13.3%) aged 15 to 29, 48 (53.3%) aged 30 to 64, and 21 (23.3%) aged 65 or older.

People could identify as more than one ethnicity. The results were 86.7% European (Pākehā), 20.0% Māori, 3.3% Pasifika, and 3.3% Asian. English was spoken by 96.7%, Māori by 3.3%, and other languages by 10.0%. The percentage of people born overseas was 20.0, compared with 28.8% nationally.

Religious affiliations were 26.7% Christian, 3.3% Islam, 3.3% Māori religious beliefs, and 3.3% New Age. People who answered that they had no religion were 63.3%, and 6.7% of people did not answer the census question.

Of those at least 15 years old, 21 (24.1%) people had a bachelor's or higher degree, 39 (44.8%) had a post-high school certificate or diploma, and 27 (31.0%) people exclusively held high school qualifications. The median income was $43,400, compared with $41,500 nationally. The employment status of those at least 15 was 60 (69.0%) full-time, 3 (3.4%) part-time, and 3 (3.4%) unemployed.

=== Haast statistical area ===
Haast statistical area covers 4,099.09 km^{2} (1,582.67 sq mi) and had an estimated population of 280 as of June 2025, with a population density of 0.068 people per km^{2}.

Historical population for the statistical area
| Year | Pop. | ±% p.a. |
|---|---|---|
| 2006 | 300 | — |
| 2013 | 240 | −3.14% |
| 2018 | 258 | +1.46% |
| 2023 | 258 | +0.00% |

The statistical area had a population of 258 in the 2023 New Zealand census, unchanged since the 2018 census, and an increase of 18 people (7.5%) since the 2013 census. There were 144 males, 114 females, and 3 people of other genders in 147 dwellings. 3.5% of people identified as LGBTIQ+. The median age was 55.2 years (compared with 38.1 years nationally). There were 15 people (5.8%) aged under 15 years, 27 (10.5%) aged 15 to 29, 138 (53.5%) aged 30 to 64, and 75 (29.1%) aged 65 or older.

People could identify as more than one ethnicity. The results were 87.2% European (Pākehā); 15.1% Māori; 4.7% Pasifika; 2.3% Asian; 1.2% Middle Eastern, Latin American and African New Zealanders (MELAA); and 2.3% other, which includes people giving their ethnicity as "New Zealander". English was spoken by 97.7%, Māori by 2.3%, Samoan by 3.5%, and other languages by 4.7%. No language could be spoken by 1.2% (e.g. too young to talk). The percentage of people born overseas was 14.0, compared with 28.8% nationally.

Religious affiliations were 30.2% Christian, 1.2% Islam, 1.2% Māori religious beliefs, 1.2% New Age, and 1.2% other religions. People who answered that they had no religion were 58.1%, and 8.1% of people did not answer the census question.

Of those at least 15 years old, 30 (12.3%) people had a bachelor's or higher degree, 126 (51.9%) had a post-high school certificate or diploma, and 84 (34.6%) people exclusively held high school qualifications. The median income was $35,900, compared with $41,500 nationally. 9 people (3.7%) earned over $100,000 compared to 12.1% nationally. The employment status of those at least 15 was 129 (53.1%) full-time, 30 (12.3%) part-time, and 3 (1.2%) unemployed.

== Biodiversity ==
The Haast tokoeka is one of the rarest subspecies of kiwi, with more than half the known population living in an actively managed area of the Haast ranges.

== Economy ==
The main economic activities in the Haast region are farming, fishing and tourism.

== Infrastructure ==
The Haast area is not connected to the national electricity grid. New Zealand Energy operates an electricity distribution network supplying the town. Electricity is generated by an 800-kilowatt hydroelectric scheme on the Turnbull River, constructed in 1972. The scheme is backed up by a 375-kilowatt diesel generator. In 2023, the company applied for consent to build a second hydro power station on the Turnbull River.

Haast received mobile coverage in May 2018. 3G mobile coverage is provided for all three mobile networks within a 3 km (2 mi) radius of Haast township. Fibre broadband and 4G mobile coverage became available in the township in 2022.

== Education ==
The Haast School is a coeducational full primary (years 1–8) school with a student roll of 9 as of July 2026. The school appears to have been extant in 1888. It was destroyed by fire in 1960, and rebuilt. It is the most isolated school in the mainland of New Zealand.

There are no secondary schools in the Haast area. The nearest is Mount Aspiring College, 140 kilometres (85 mi) away over the Haast Pass in Wānaka, too far away to be practical. Most secondary students board at schools in Alexandra, Oamaru or Dunedin.

== See also ==
- Haast Aerodrome
- Haast-Hollyford road
