= State Highway 6 (New Zealand) =

Road in New Zealand

State Highway 6

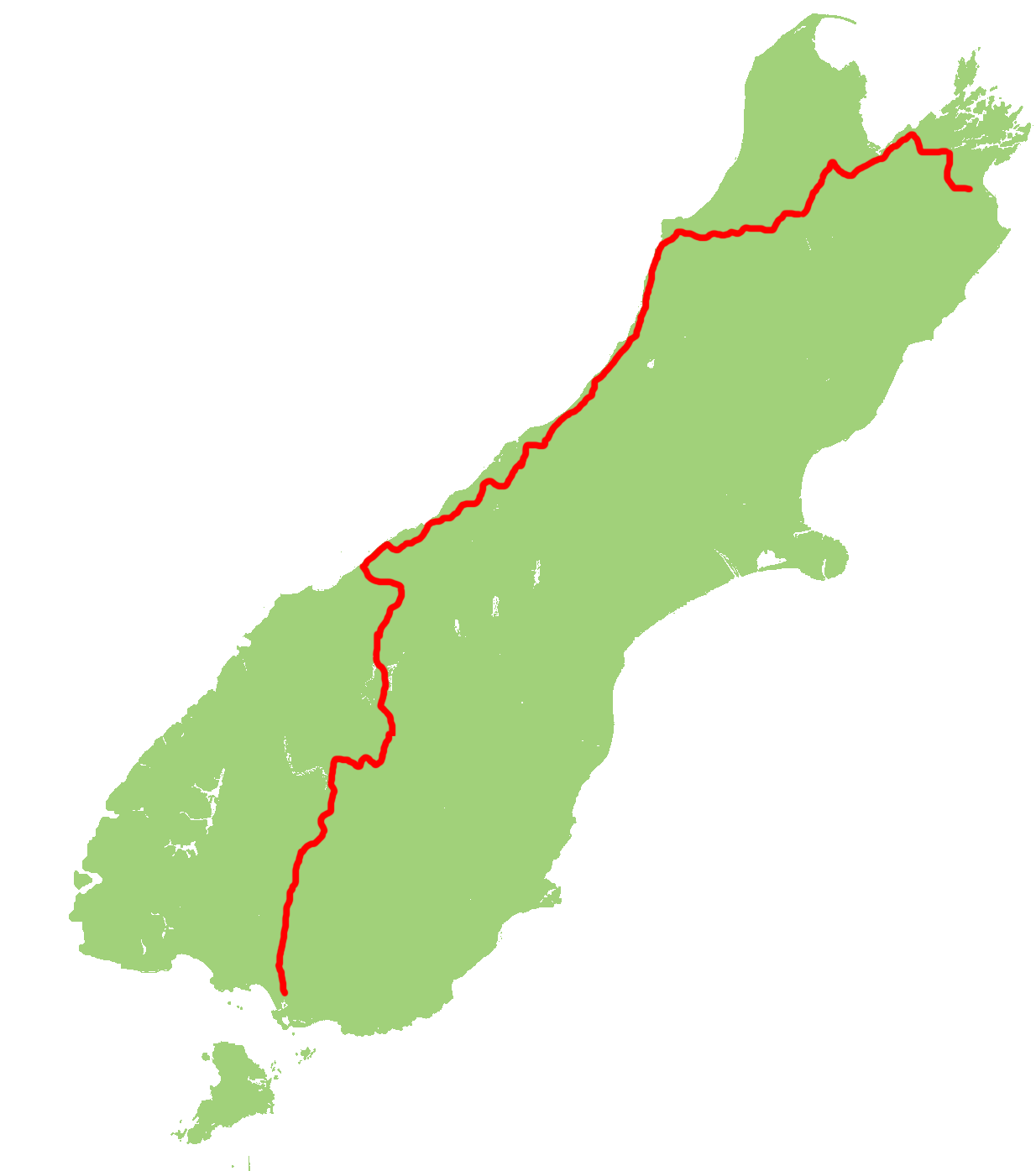

Route information
- Maintained by NZ Transport Agency Waka Kotahi
- Length: 1,162 km (722 mi)
- Tourist routes: Southern Scenic Route between Invercargill-Lorneville and Five Rivers-Queenstown (as of 2010)

Major junctions
- North end: SH 1 (Grove Road/Sinclair Street) at Blenheim
- SH 7 (Omoto Road) at Greymouth; SH 8A (Shortcut Road) to SH 8 at Luggate; SH 8B to SH 8 at Cromwell
- South end: SH 1 (Tay Street/Clyde Street) at Invercargill

Location
- Country: New Zealand
- Primary destinations: Nelson, Murchison, Inangahua Junction, Runanga, Greymouth, Hokitika, Haast, Wānaka, Cromwell, Queenstown, Lumsden, Winton

Highway system
- New Zealand state highways; Motorways and expressways; List
← SH 5	→ SH 7

State Highway 6 (SH 6) is a major New Zealand state highway. It extends from the Marlborough region in the northeastern corner of the South Island across the top of the island, then down the length of the island, initially along the West Coast and then across the Southern Alps through inland Otago and finally across the Southland Plains to the island's south coast. Distances are measured from north to south.

The highway is the longest single highway in the country, though it is shorter than the combined totals of the two highways that comprise SH 1, SHs 1N and 1S.

For most of its length SH6 is a two-lane single carriageway, except for 5.4 km of dual carriageway in Invercargill, and passing lanes in Invercargill and Nelson, with at-grade intersections and property accesses, both in rural and urban areas. Roundabouts are common in major towns, with traffic signals only found in Invercargill, Queenstown, Richmond, and Tāhunanui with signals also controlling Iron Bridge in the upper Buller Gorge, Fern Arch in the lower Buller Gorge near Westport, and the Albert Town Bridge over the Clutha River near Albert Town. NZTA classified the highway as an arterial route, except for two sections between Blenheim (SH 1) and Richmond (SH 60) and between Cromwell (SH 8B) and Five Rivers (SH 97) where SH 6 is classified as a regional strategic route.

== Route ==
=== Marlborough ===
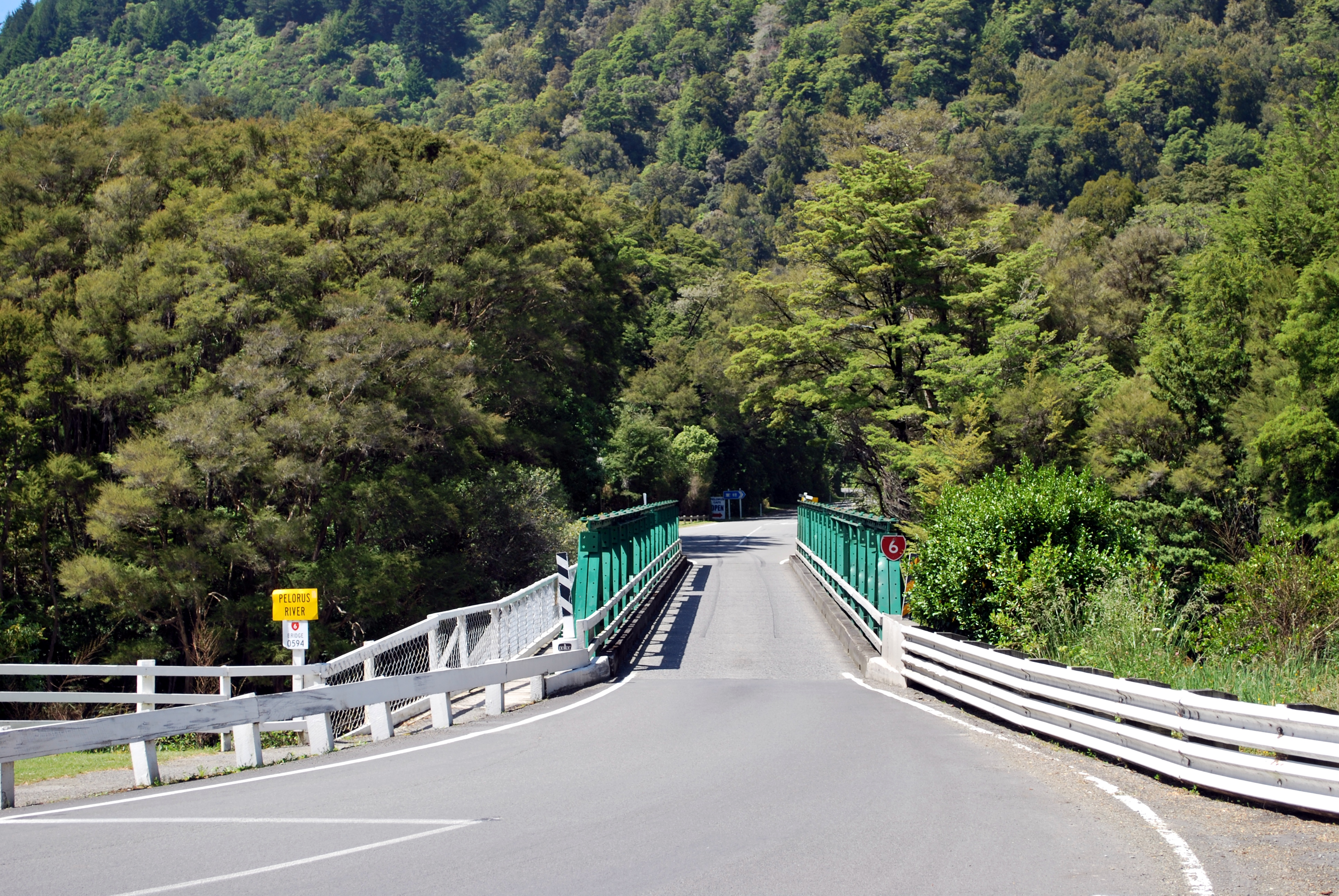
State Highway 6 crossing the Pelorus River in Marlborough

The highway leaves State Highway 1 at Blenheim, initially travelling west through Woodboune to Renwick. At Renwick the highway turns north, crossing the Wairau River and following the Kaituna River valley to meet Pelorus Sound/Te Hoiere at Havelock. From Havelock, the highway heads inland up the valley of the Pelorus River. At Pelorus Bridge the highway again turns north through Rai Valley, and crosses into Nelson region at the Rai Saddle.

=== Nelson-Tasman ===
The highway then tends southwest as it crosses over the Whangamoa Saddle approaching the coast of Tasman Bay / Te Tai-o-Aorere. The highway travels through the city of Nelson and nearby town of Richmond, continuing southwest across the plains of the Wairoa and Motueka Rivers.

From these plains, the road ascends rapidly to the 634-metre Hope Saddle. From here, the highway heads generally westward, along the valley of the Buller River and its tributaries. Beyond Murchison, this valley narrows to become the scenic Buller Gorge, and the highway twists its way high above the waters of the river.

=== West Coast ===
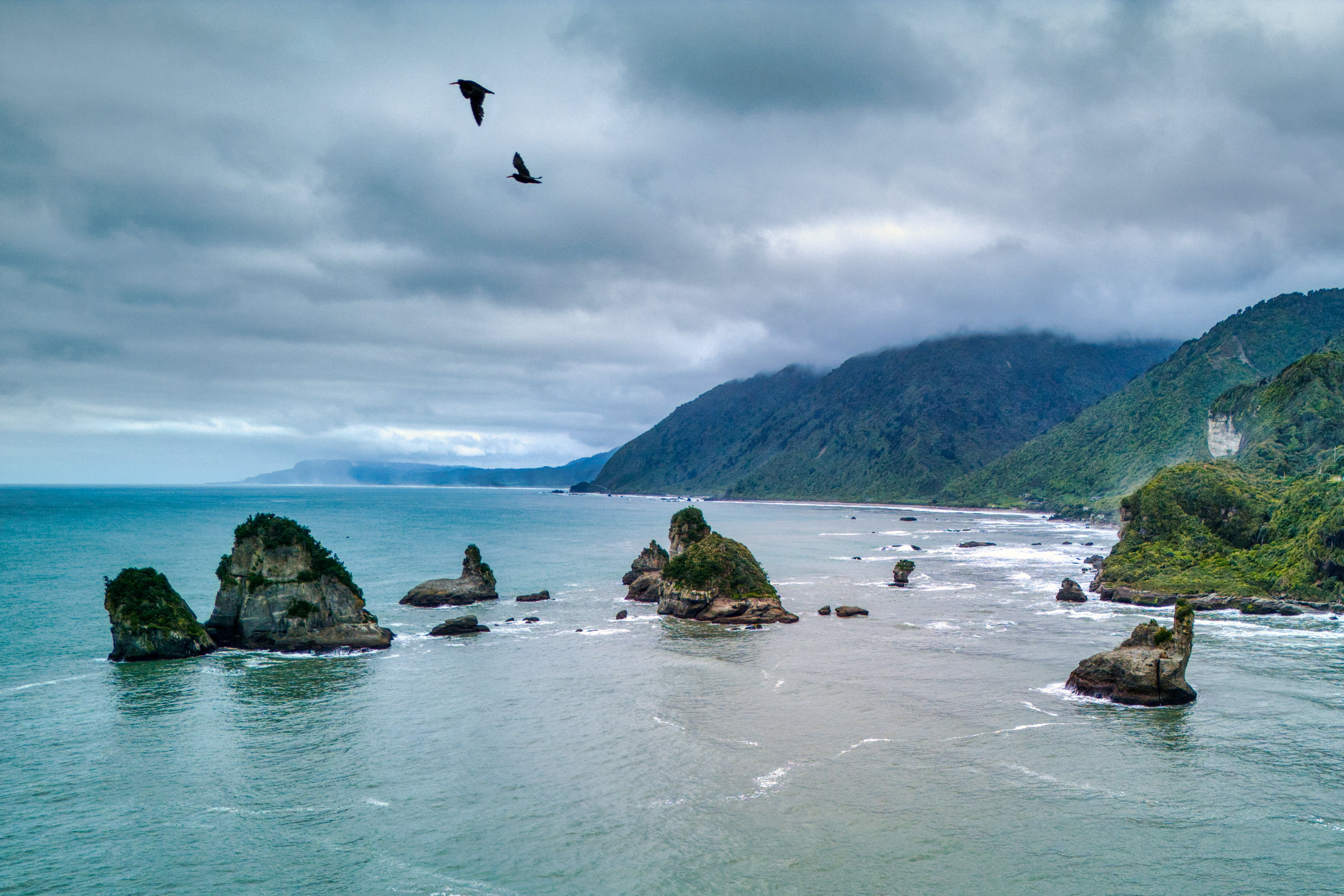
Motukiekie Rocks

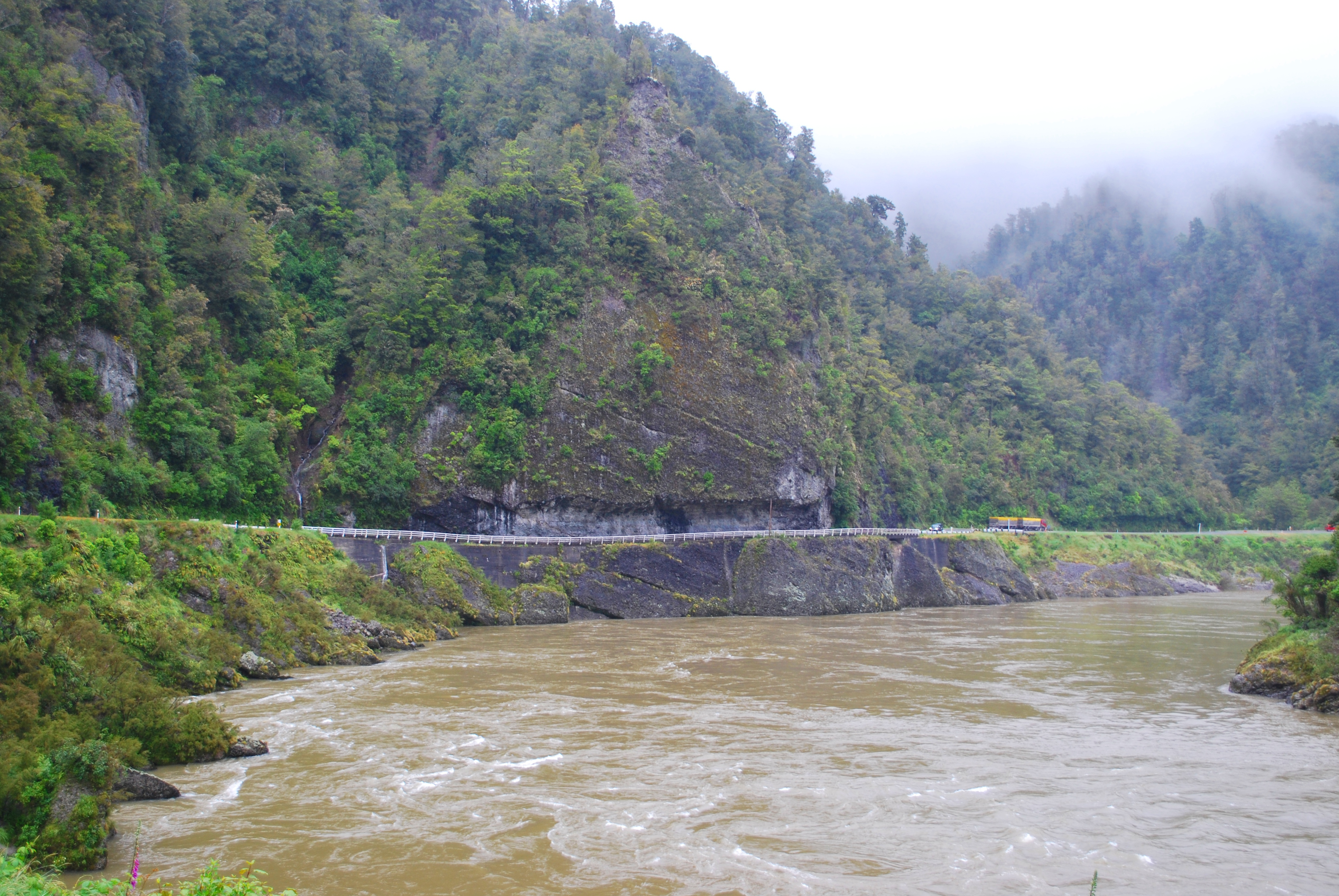
"Hawks Crag", a half-tunnel of a rock shelf carrying State Highway 6 along the bank of the Buller River

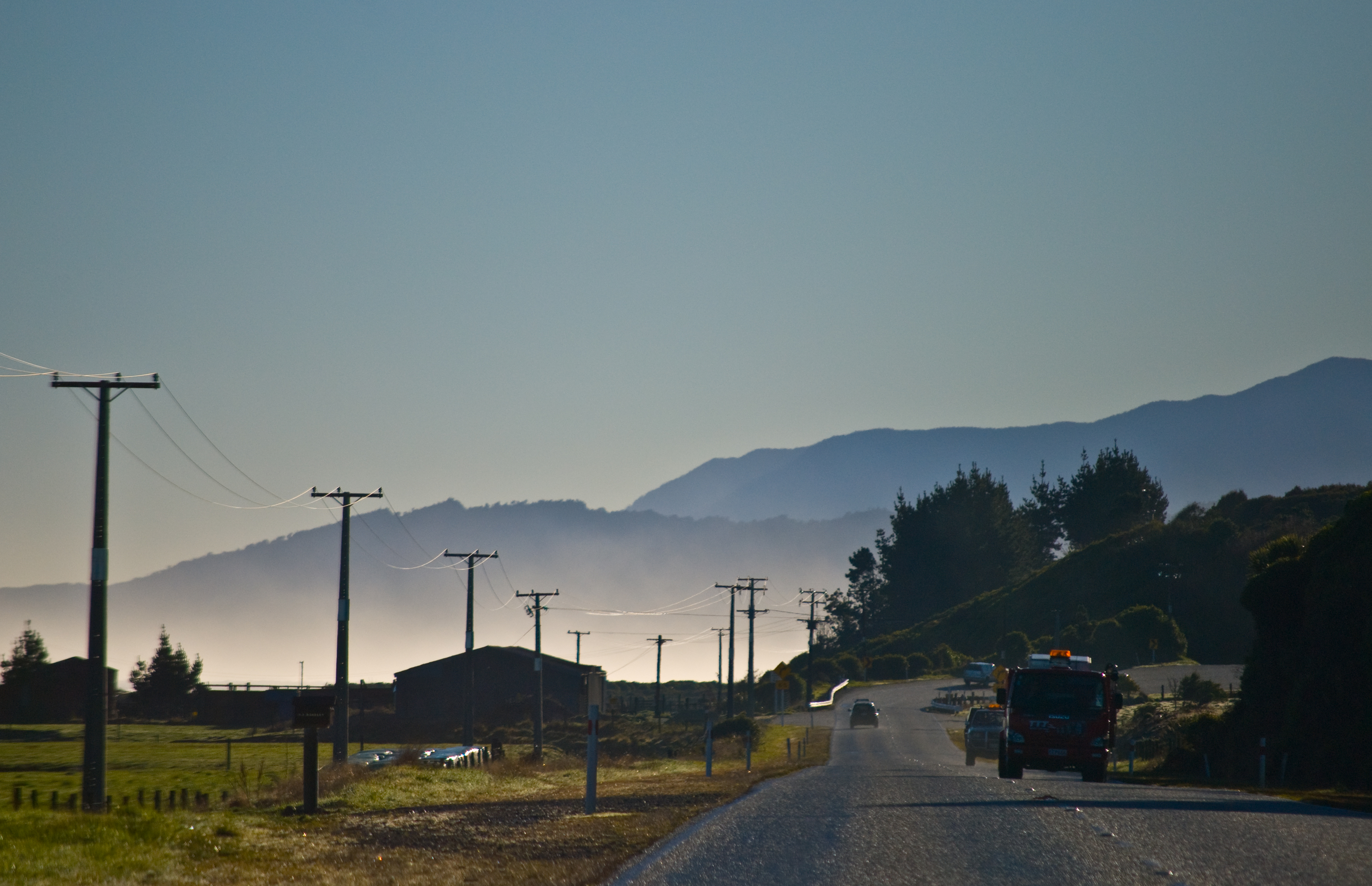
State Highway 6 near Kumara Junction.

The highway leaves the river as its valley broadens, turning south six kilometres from Westport, where the river reaches the sea. From here, the highway keeps close to the Tasman coast from Charleston for over 100 kilometres, turning inland only briefly near Runanga. This 100-kilometre stretch includes two of the coast's larger towns, Greymouth and Hokitika.

From Hokitika, the highway moves away from the coast, though still generally keeps within five kilometres of the sea. The highway continues south past Ross and Harihari, moving through state forests as it crosses several fast-moving rivers. Seventy kilometres south of Harihari, the highway skirts Lake Mapourika and reaches the tourist settlement of Franz Josef Glacier. The glacier itself, one of two within easy walking distance of the highway, lies nearby in the Southern Alps, which here come very close to the Tasman coast. The second glacier, Fox Glacier is located some 20 kilometres further south. The highway again briefly touches the coast at Bruce Bay before heading inland past Lake Paringa, before reemerging on the Tasman coast at Knights Point. The 30 km stretch of highway from here south to Haast is noted for its rugged scenery. After crossing the Haast River, the highway turns eastward and inland up the river's valley, climbing past the Gates of Haast and crossing the 563-metre Haast Pass, the southernmost of the three main road passes across the Southern Alps.

=== Otago ===
From here, the highway again turns south, following the Makarora River valley to the northern tip of Lake Wānaka. The highway skirts the eastern coast of the lake before crossing The Neck, a saddle in the mountains that lie between Lakes Wānaka and Hāwea. The highway continues along the western shore of Hāwea, then south along the Hāwea River to Albert Town, close to the tourist centre of Wānaka.

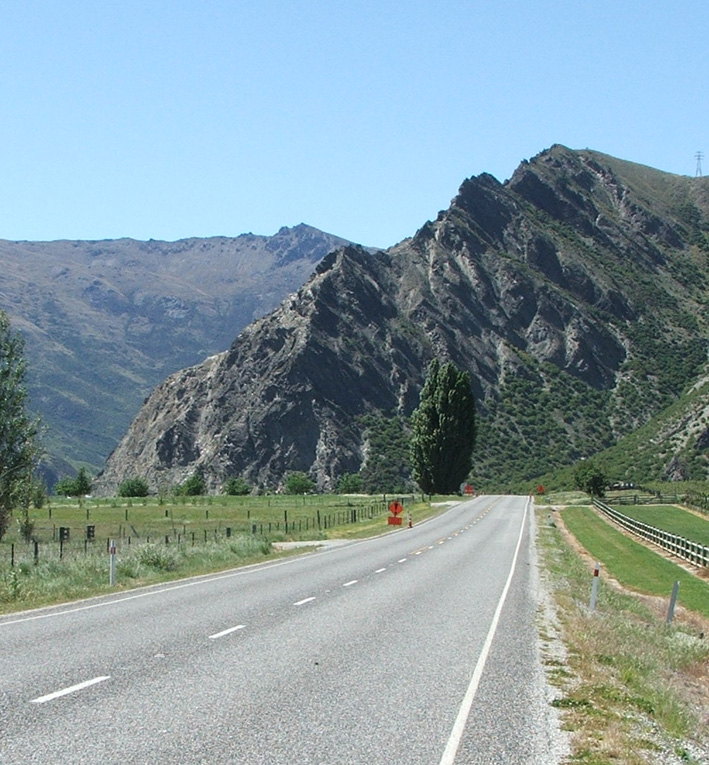
State Highway 6 at the Nevis Bluff.

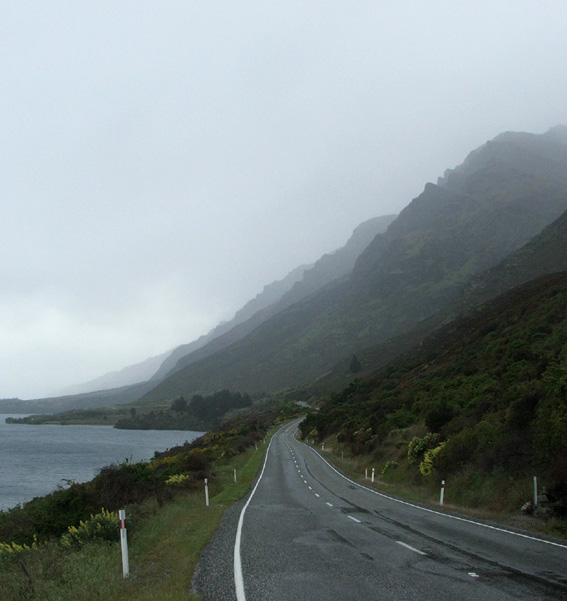
State Highway 6 skirts the slopes of The Remarkables and shore of Lake Wakatipu south of Queenstown.

Ten kilometres from Wānaka, the highway is met by SH 8A, a spur of SH 8 skirting the shore of Lake Dunstan. SH 6 continues south along the western shore of the Lake, paralleling SH 8 which lies on the eastern shore. Close to Cromwell, a second spur, SH 8B, connects the two highways. From here, SH6 turns west, following the narrow and twisting Kawarau Gorge, emerging close to the wine-producing area of Gibbston.

At the western end of the Kawarau Gorge, midway between Cromwell and Queenstown, the highway passes the Nevis Bluff, a steep schist rock outcrop rising 100 m above the Kawarau River. The highway has a history of being disrupted and closed at this point due to instability and rock falls from the bluff. The first road around the bluff was constructed in 1866, opening access to the Wakatipu goldfields. Significant slips occurred at the bluff on 20 February 1940, and blocking SH6 in June 1975. On 17 September 2000, a large-scale rock fall buried the highway at the bluff, and several motorists narrowly avoided being killed. The fall was caught on video and showed a volume of 10,000 m³ for the main fall; the resulting dust cloud was seen 5 km away. Transit New Zealand conducted stabilisation drilling and blasting at the bluff twice in 2006 and again in 2007.

From the Nevis Bluff, the highway continues west, reaching Frankton, close to the shore of Lake Wakatipu. The highway turns south to follow the southeastern shore of the lake, skirting the foot of The Remarkables and the Hector Mountains. This stretch of the highway is in part tortuously winding, and rises and falls over a stretch known as "The Devil's Staircase". The Devil's Staircase was named by Donald Angus Cameron.

=== Southland ===
The highway leaves the lake's shore at Kingston, continuing south to Garston, where, the highway briefly follows the course of the infant Mataura River before heading across the Jollies Hill Pass to the upper reaches of the Ōreti River near Lowther. The highway continues to follow the Ōreti south, through Lumsden, then across the Southland Plains, past the town of Winton before reaching its terminus at a junction with SH 1 in central Invercargill.

== Spur sections ==
SH6 has one spur, designated State Highway 6A (also part of the Southern Scenic Route). This 6.9 km highway links Frankton with the tourist centre of Queenstown.

== Engineering features ==
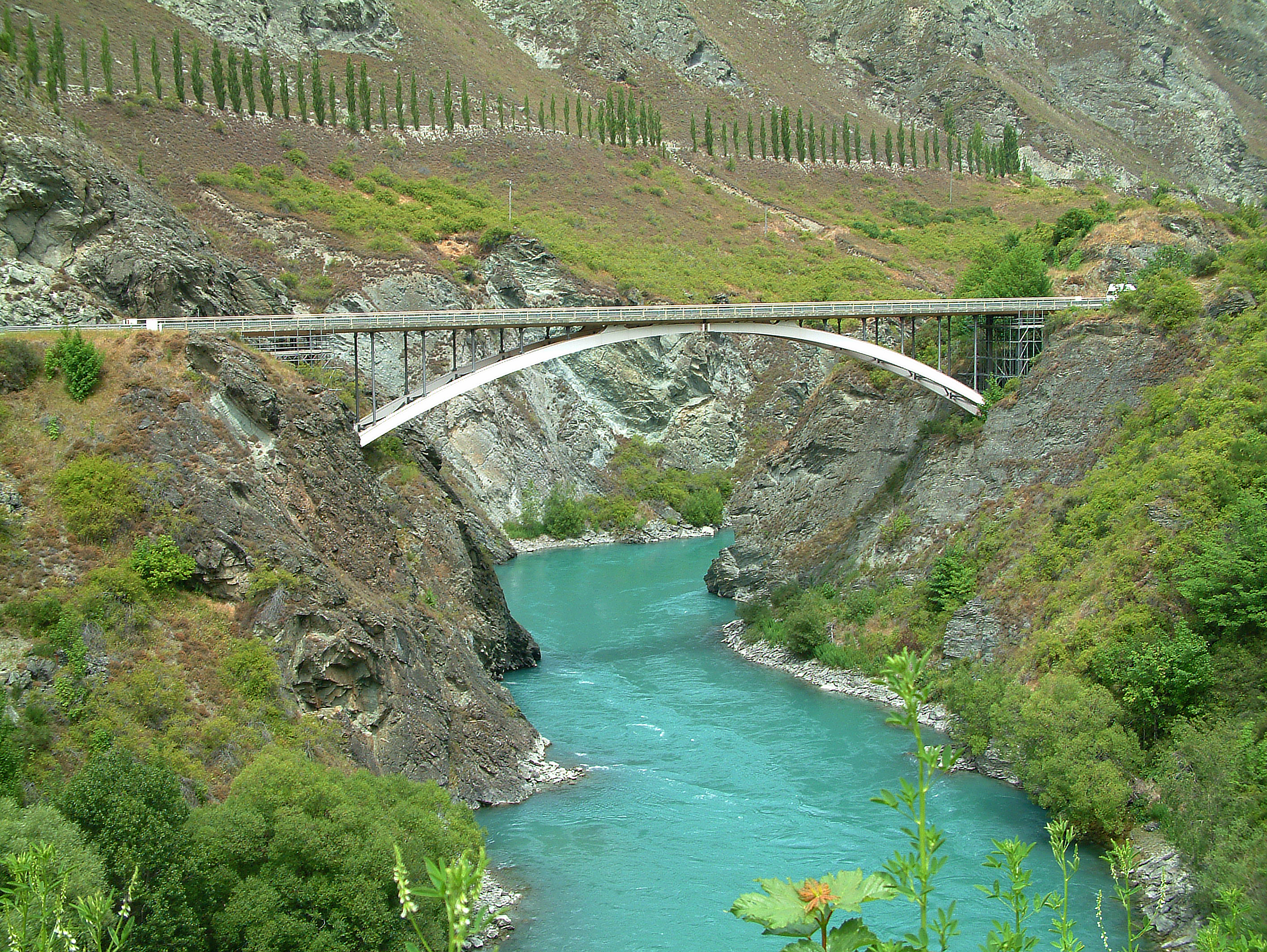
The Kawarau River Bridge on State Highway 6

- Hawk's Crag is a single-lane half tunnel blasted out of a solid rock bluff in the Buller Gorge. It was constructed in 1869.
- The highway featured a number of combined road-rail bridges, but they have all now been replaced.
- The Haast River bridge (km 750.0) is now the longest single-lane bridge in the country, with two passing bays.
- A two-lane bridge was built at Kawarau Falls just south of Frankton. This superseded the one-lane bridge that was up until then the highway crossing. This opened in 2018.

== Route changes ==
SH 6 in Nelson City previously went through Stoke between Annesbrook Drive and the Richmond Deviation via Main Road. In 2003, SH 6 shifted to the newly constructed Whakatu Drive, bypassing much of the residential areas.

== Major junctions ==
Territorial authority	Location	km	mi	Destinations	Notes
Marlborough District	Blenheim	0	0.0	SH 1 north (Grove Road) – Picton, Wellington Ferry; SH 1 south (Grove Road) – Kaikōura, Christchurch	SH 6 begins
Marlborough District	Renwick	10	6.2	SH 63 – St Arnaud, Westport	
Marlborough District	Renwick	14	8.7	SH 62 (Rapaura Road) – Picton	
Nelson City	No major junctions				
Tasman District	Richmond	129	80	SH 60 (Appleby Highway) – Motueka, Collingwood	
Tasman District	Kohatu	169	105	Motueka Valley Highway – Tapawera, Motueka	Former SH 61
Tasman District		196	122	Hope Saddle 634 m (2,080 ft)	
Tasman District	Kawatiri	209	130	SH 63 – St Arnaud, Picton	
Tasman District	Ariki	255	158	SH 65 – Springs Junction, Christchurch (via Lewis Pass	
Buller District	Inangahua Junction	297	185	SH 69 – Reefton, Greymouth, Christchurch (via Lewis Pass)	
Buller District	Westport	328	204	SH 67 – Westport, Karamea	
Grey District	Greymouth	430	270	SH 7 (Omoto Road) – Reefton, Nelson, Christchurch (via Lewis Pass)	
Westland District	Kumara Junction	448	278	SH 73 (Otira Highway) – Arthur's Pass, Christchurch	
Westland District / Queenstown-Lakes District boundary	Mount Aspiring National Park	815	506	Haast Pass 564 m (1,850 ft)	
Queenstown-Lakes District	Mt Iron	893	555	SH 84 (Wanaka Luggate Highway) – Wānaka	
Queenstown-Lakes District	Luggate	901	560	SH 8A (Shortcut Road) to SH 8 – Omarama, Aoraki / Mount Cook, Christchurch	
Central Otago District	Cromwell	942	585	SH 8B to SH 8 – Cromwell, Aoraki / Mount Cook, Dunedin, Christchurch	
Queenstown-Lakes District	Arrow Junction	983	611	Crown Range Road – Cardrona, Wānaka	Former SH 89
Queenstown-Lakes District	Frankton	996	619	SH 6A (Frankton Road) – Queenstown	
Southland District	Five Rivers	1,082	672	SH 97 (Mossburn Five Rivers Road) – Te Anau, Milford Sound/Piopiotahi	
Southland District	Lumsden	1,093	679	SH 94 west (Mossburn Lumsden Highway) – Te Anau, Milford Sound/Piopiotahi	SH 6/SH 94 concurrency begins
Southland District	Lumsden	1,095	680	SH 94 west (Flora Road) – Gore	SH 6/SH 94 concurrency ends
Southland District	Winton	1,143	710	SH 96 west (Winton Wreys Bush Highway) – Nightcaps, Ohai	SH 6/SH 96 concurrency begins
Southland District	Winton	1,145	711	SH 96 east (Winton Hedgehope Highway) – Mataura	SH 6/SH 96 concurrency ends
Invercargill City	Lorneville	1,168	726	SH 98 (Lorne Dacre Road) – Dacre, Gore; SH 99 (Wallacetown Lorneville Highway) – Riverton/Aparima, Tuatapere	
Invercargill City	Invercargill city centre	1,176	731	SH 1 north (Tay Street) – Gore, Dunedin; SH 1 south (Clyde Street) – Bluff	SH 6 ends
Concurrency terminus

== See also ==
- Nelson - Blenheim notional railway; between 1957 and 1979, for the purpose of subsidising passenger and freight rates, the Nelson – Blenheim section of SH6 was deemed by law to be a railway.
