= Lake Ōhau =

Lake in the South Island of New Zealand

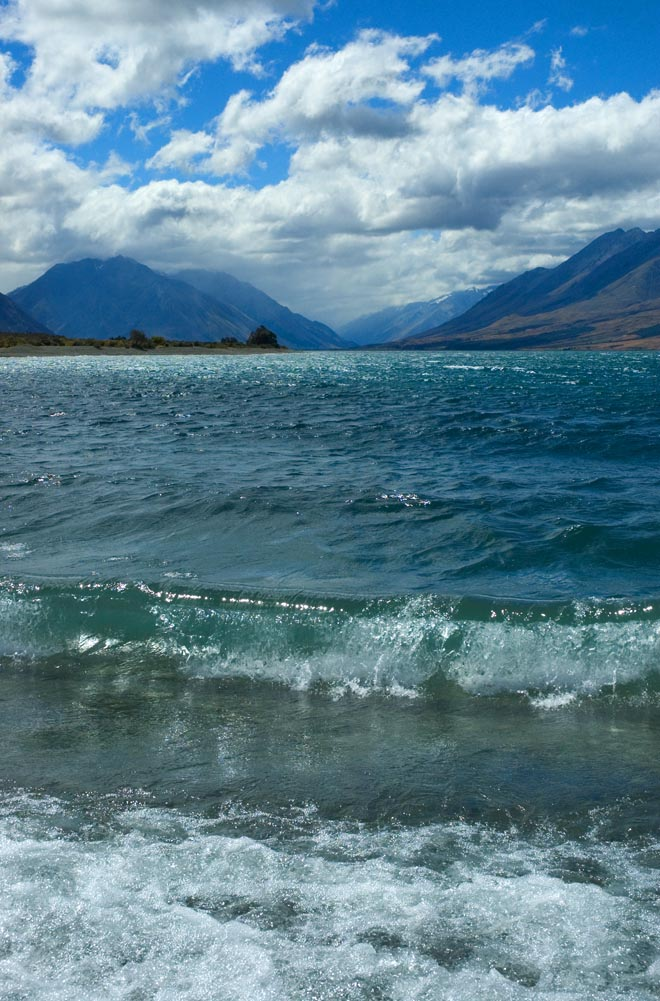
- Lake Ōhau

- Location within South Island
- Interactive map of Lake Ōhau
- Location: Mackenzie Basin, Waitaki District, Canterbury region, South Island
- Coordinates: 44°15′S 169°51′E
- Type: glacial lake
- Primary inflows: Hopkins, Dobson
- Primary outflows: Ōhau
- Catchment area: 1,198 km^{2} (463 sq mi)
- Basin countries: New Zealand
- Surface area: 54 km^{2} (21 sq mi)
- Average depth: 74 m (243 ft)
- Max. depth: 129 m (423 ft)
- Water volume: 4.02 km^{3} (3,260,000 acre⋅ft)
- Surface elevation: 520 m (1,710 ft)

Lake Ōhau is a lake in the Mackenzie Basin in the South Island of New Zealand. The Hopkins and Dobson rivers fed into the northern end of Lake Ōhau. These rivers have their headwaters in the Southern Alps. The lake's outflow is the Ōhau River, which travels from the southeast corner of Lake Ōhau and feeds into the Waitaki River hydroelectric project. The Barrier range (and Mount Sutton 2007m in particular) dominate the western side of Lake Ōhau, while the Ben Ohau range dominates the eastern side of Lake Ōhau. At the northern end of the lake, in between the Hopkins and Dobson rivers, lies the Naumann Range of mountains (with Mount Glenmary 2590m being the tallest).

The New Zealand Ministry for Culture and Heritage gives a translation of "place of Hau" for Ōhau, but an alternative meaning could be "windy place".

Ōhau is the smallest of three roughly parallel lakes running north–south along the northern edge of the Mackenzie Basin (the others are Lake Pukaki and Lake Tekapo). It covers 60 km^{2}.

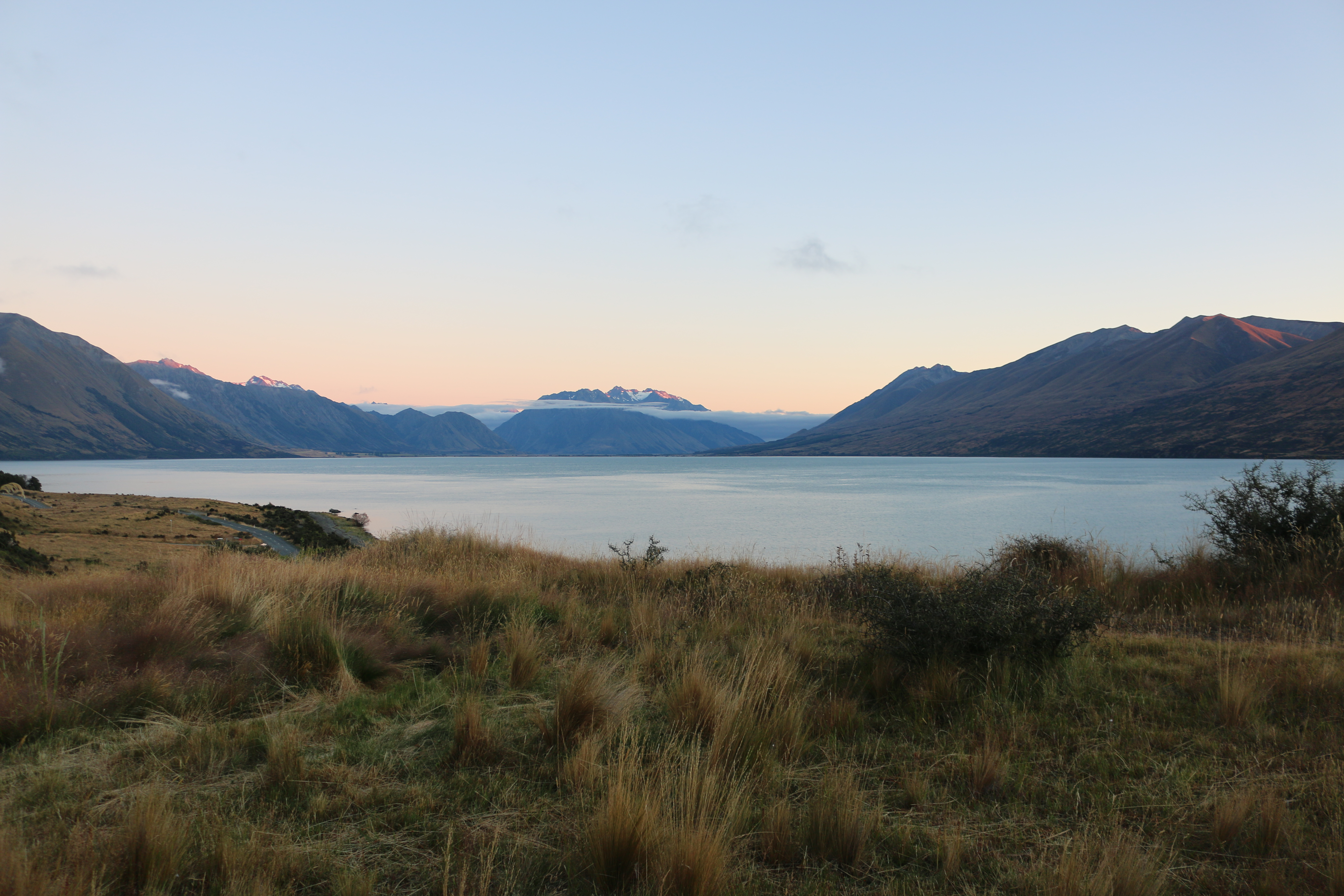
Lake Ōhau with tussocks in the foreground

Lake Ohau Alpine Village is located on the western shore of the Lake.

The lake forms part of the traditional boundary between the Otago and Canterbury regions, Otago's northernmost point being the headwaters of the Hopkins River. Officially the lake lies in the northwestern part of the Waitaki District within the southern part of the Canterbury region.

== Location ==
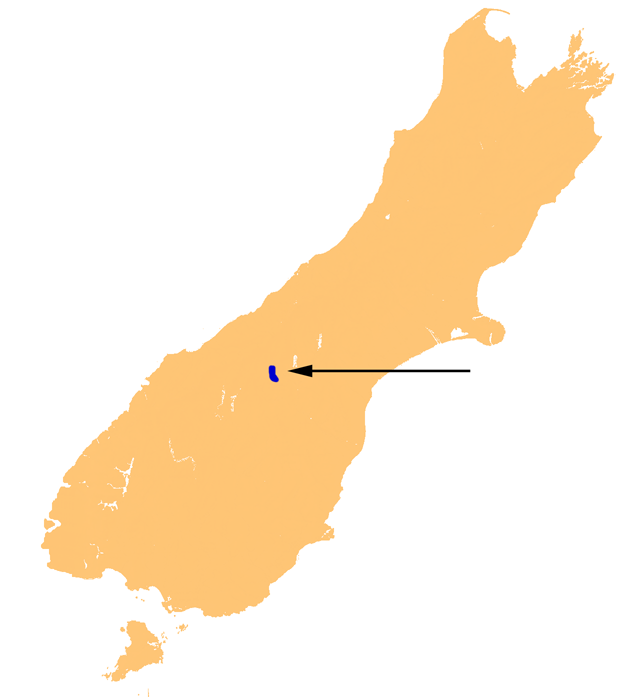
Location

Lake Ōhau is 320 kilometres (four hours drive) west of Christchurch and 275 kilometres (three hours drive) north of Dunedin. It is accessed by turning off State Highway 8 between Twizel and Omarama on to Lake Ōhau Road which arrives at Lake Ōhau after about 17 kilometres.

== Climate ==
The warmest month of the year is February, with an average temperature of 15.4 °C | 59.7 °F. The lowest average temperatures in the year occur in July, when it is around 2.8 °C | 37.0 °F. Monthly rainfall ranges between an average of 57mm in February to 101mm in October. Snow is common in the winter months of June, July and August.

== In Māori culture ==
The legends of Ngāi Tahu speak of Lake Ōhau being one of the lakes dug by the Waitaha explorer Rākaihautū with his Polynesian digging stick which was called [Tūwhakaroria. After arriving in the Uruao waka at Nelson, Rākaihautū divided his people into two groups. Rākaihautū led his group down the middle of the island, digging the South Island freshwater lakes. His son, Rakihouia, led the other group down the east coast of the South Island.

Ngāi Tahu visited Lake Ōhau as part of their seasonal food gathering patterns. It was well known for eels and weka. These were gathered and preserved for the upcoming winter months.

== Population ==
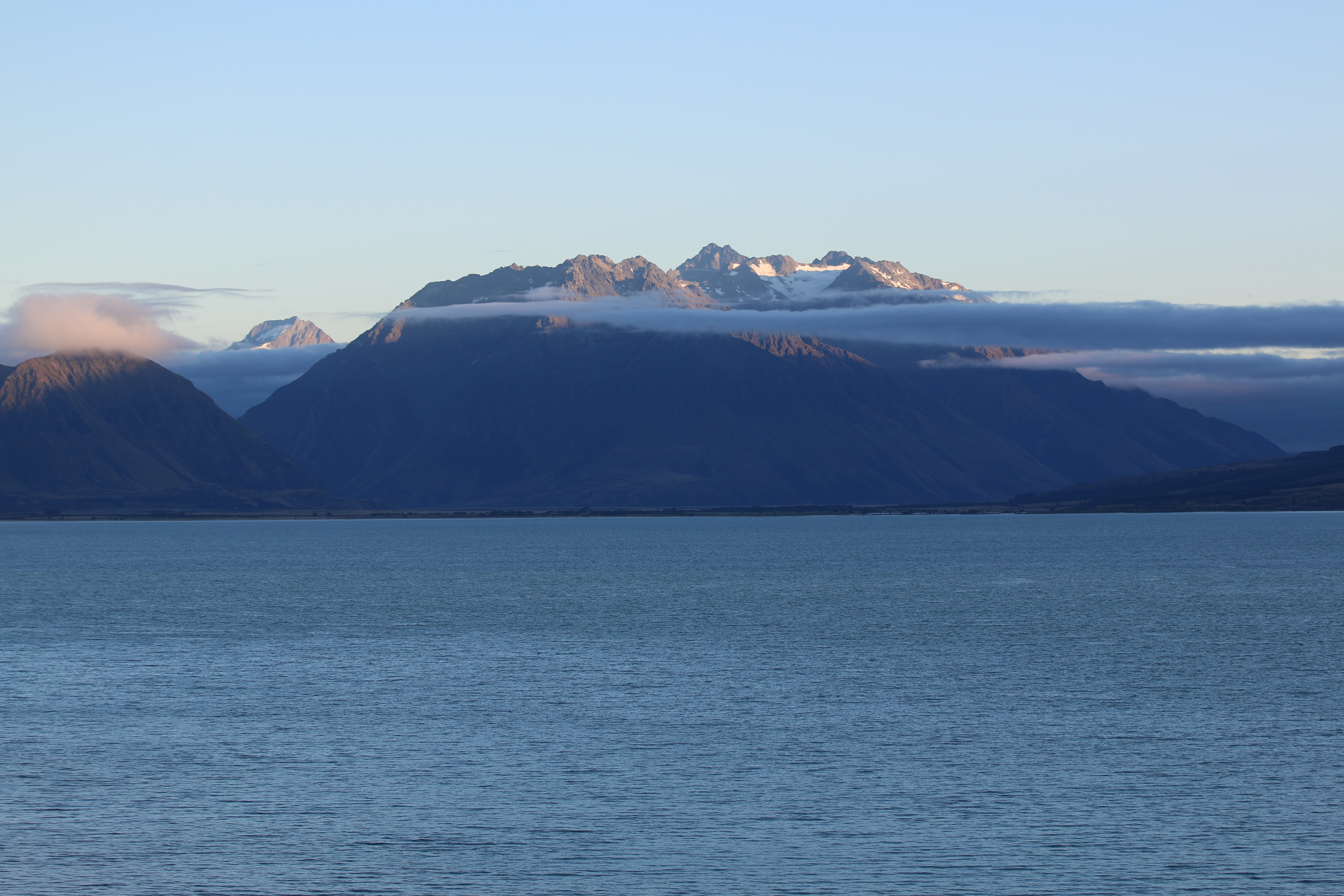
Lake Ōhau, looking north from the Lake Ohau Alpine Village

Lake Ōhau is probably one of the most unpopulated lakes in New Zealand. The Lake Ōhau Alpine Village has 140 sections and around 30 houses, of which the majority are holiday homes. The Village population was increasing, before the 4 October 2020 wildfire destroyed 48 houses in the Village. Visitors are often astounded by the peace and quiet around Lake Ōhau. Some believe Lake Ōhau has benefited from tourism and visitors, However, only the local businesses benefit, and many locals are left cleaning up rubbish and reminding visitors fires, and fireworks, are prohibited.

== Stargazing ==
Lake Ōhau with its clear unpolluted skies and small population is known for the quality of the stargazing. In 2012, a 4300 square kilometre area was declared the Aoraki Mackenzie Dark Sky Reserve, the boundary of which follows the eastern shore of Lake Ōhau. This is one of only eight in the world.

== Farming ==
Farming has been the main economic activity around Lake Ōhau since the late 1800s. Several large high country stations existing in the immediate vicinity. Eileen McMillan wrote a 508 page book entitled "Frugal Country and Hard on the Boots" that covers the history of Lake Ōhau including farming in the region. In 1857 the land south and east of Lake Ōhau, Benmore Station, was leased to brothers George and Edmund Hodgkinson and Ronald McMurdo. In the 1870s, the Benmore Station comprised 101 500 hectares and 65 000 sheep.

In 1859 land at the head of the lake was leased and this high country station was known as the Lake Ohau Station. These huge high country stations were eventually broken up (around 1916) into smaller holdings as the population was unhappy about a small number of people owning the majority of the land. Sheep and beef farming continues to the present around Lake Ōhau.

== Skiing ==
Ōhau Ski Field is located on the western shore of the lake and is a 20 minute drive up a 9.6 km well-formed access road from the Lake Ohau Lodge. It is well known for its consistent snow, variety of runs and friendly atmosphere. The skifield was established in 1953 on Mount Sutton. As of 2020, it has a double chairlift, a platter and a snow mat.

The 2-seater chairlift reaches 1825 metres above sea level and from there, many intrepid skiers walk the remaining 100 vertical metres to the ridge to enjoy the views of the Southern Alps before skiing back down. Ōhau Ski Field has significant snow making capability.

The Glen Mary Ski Club was created in 1958 and a single room building was built on land between Freehold Creek and Parson’s Creek on the shores of Lake Ōhau. The club buildings have expanded over the years to include a 24 bed bunkhouse and a sauna.

== Fishing ==
Lake Ōhau is well known for its brown trout and rainbow trout fishing. It is also possible to catch some small landlocked sockeye salmon, all invasive species of fish which outcompete the native fish species, decreasing the local freshwater biodiversity. Trolling from a boat, spinning from the shore and fly fishing are all popular methods of fishing at Lake Ōhau. Fishing in the Dobson and Hopkins rivers which flow into Lake Ōhau are well known spots for catching trout. There is good access to the lakeshore via the gravel road which runs around the almost all of the eastern and western shorelines. The large weed-beds at the southern end of Lake Ōhau are easily fished with bait such as shrimp and prawn. The Hopkins River mouth provides good fishing however very loose shingle can make wading potentially dangerous. Large floods in this lake following heavy rain occur at regular intervals. On these occasions, Lake Ōhau can be dirty and unfishable for several weeks.

== Mountain biking ==
Lake Ōhau is on the route of the Alps to Ocean Cycle Trail, which has been constructed in the years after approval in 2010.

Stage 3 of the Alps 2 Ocean runs from Twizel to Lake Ōhau Lodge. This 38 km section takes riders along the canal roads to the edge of Lake Ōhau. It then turns into an off-road trail which runs along the lake up to Lake Ōhau Lodge. This section is of an easy skill level, with little traffic.

Stage 4 of the Alps 2 Ocean starts at the Lake Ōhau Lodge. The 45 km section traverses the lower slopes of the Ohau Range past Freehold Creek and climbs to the highest point of the Alps 2 Ocean, 900 metres above sea level, before a long descent with some rough and loose sections, finally arriving at a historic woolshed at the top of Quailburn Road. From here, mountain bikers ride most of the remaining stage on quiet country roads before arriving at Omarama.

== Lake Middleton ==
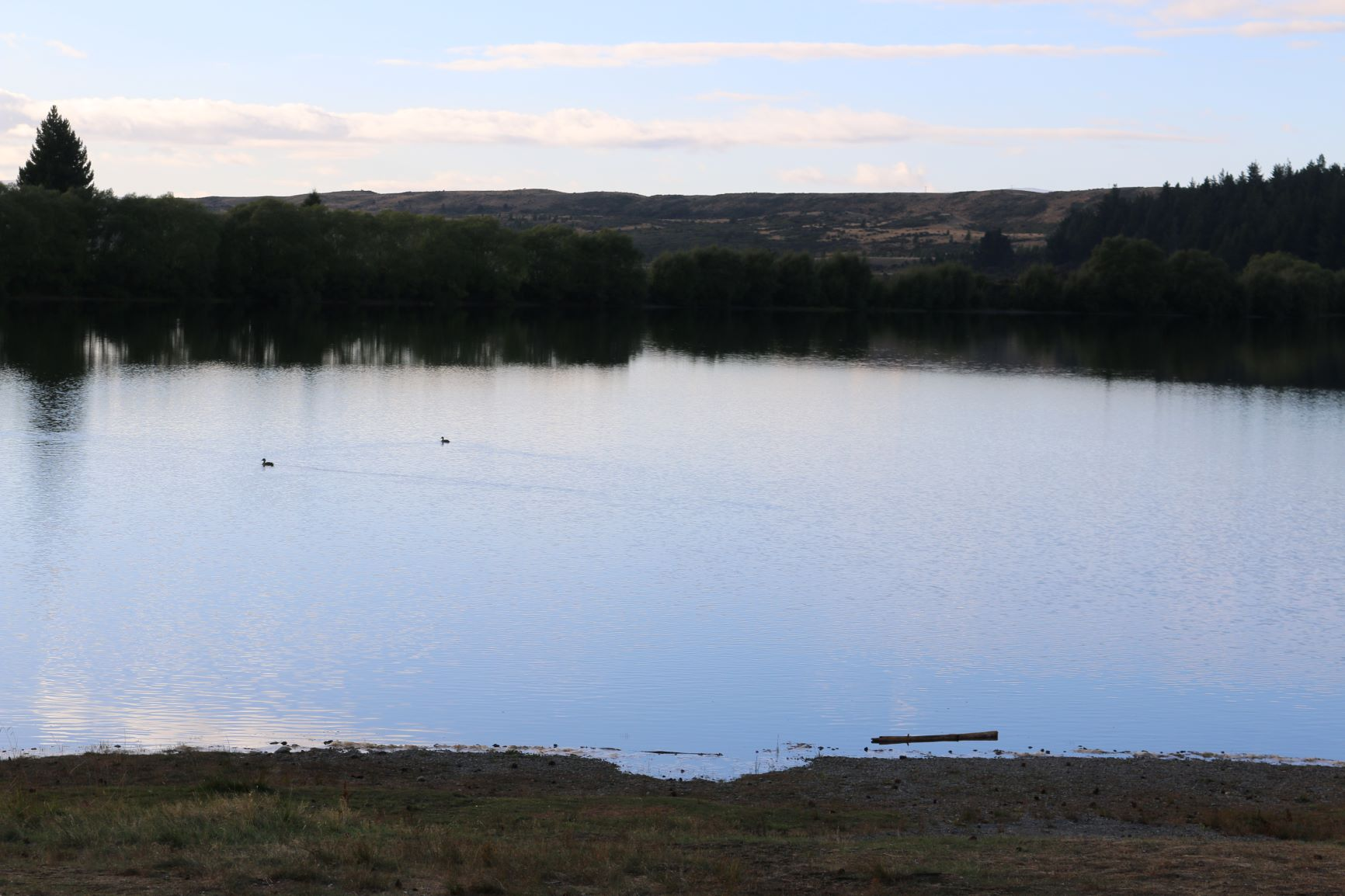
Lake Middleton (February 2018)

Next to Lake Ōhau is the much smaller Lake Middleton. It has a shoreline of just under two kilometres, with a surface area of approximately 24 hectares. It is a popular spot in summer for camping, boating and fishing. The lake is 523 metres above sea level.

Bookings are not required for the campsite, but campsite access is paid for at the roadside sign. Access is available for motor homes and cars. Lake access is available for boats. There is a desire to provide a walking track around Lake Middleton but progress has been slow.

The northern end of the lake is roped off with a buoy line to mark an area for swimming. In 2019, 83% of the water samples met the swimming water quality standard. However the northern end of the lake is filling in with sediment and weed on the lake floor up to one metre deep in some places. The swimming area is now considered unsuitable for swimming

The many indigenous wildlife species at Lake Middleton include four fish, 27 birds, 26 plants (aquatic and terrestrial), 14 invertebrates (aquatic), and lizards present.

== Tramping around Lake Ōhau ==
The many options for tramping around Lake Ōhau range from short walks such as the Freehold Creek Track (6 km, 2–3 hours), to longer over night trips up the Hopkins and Huxley Valleys. Several back country huts in the Hopkins Valley are worth a visit, including Monument Hut, Red Hut, Elcho Hut and Erceg Hut.

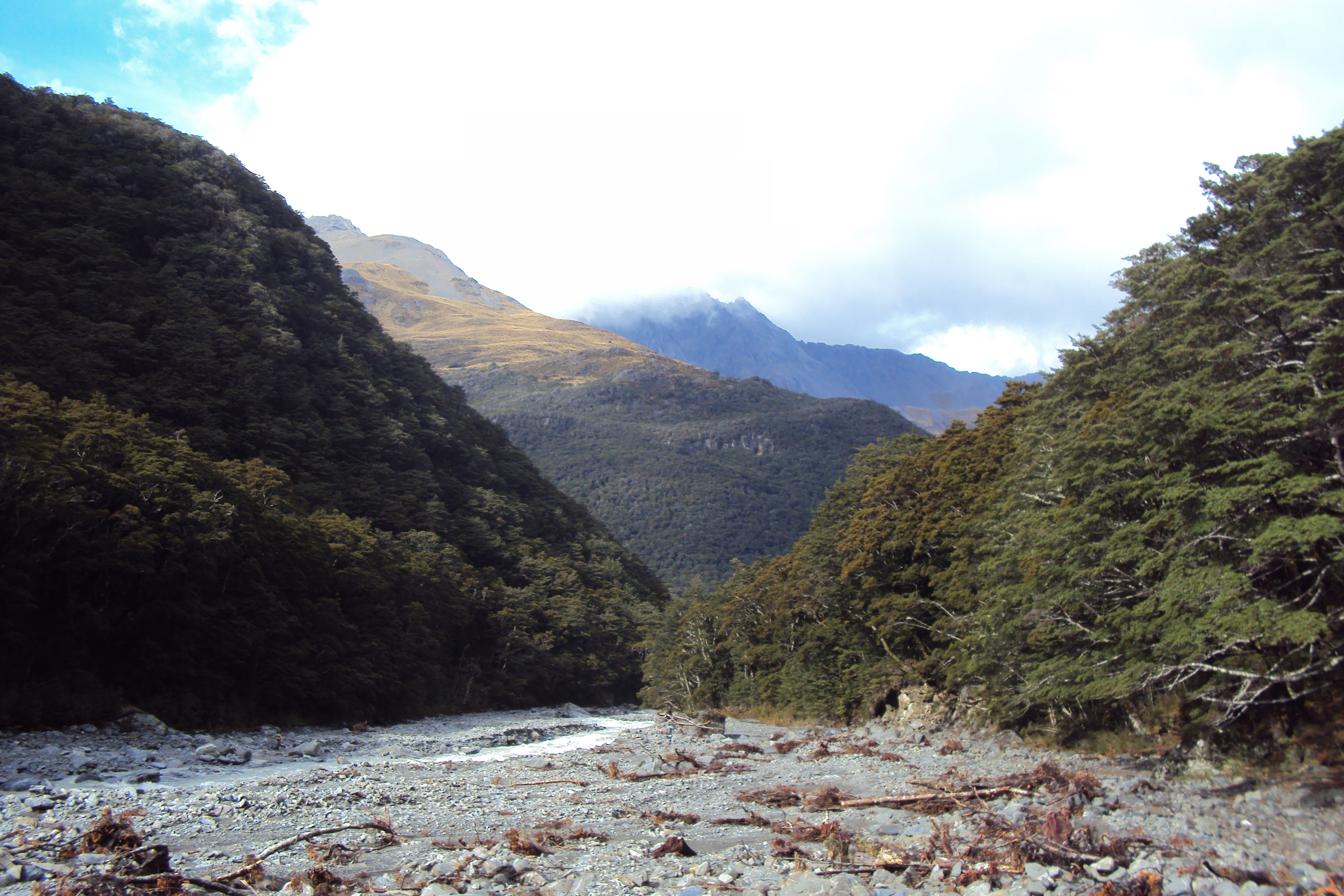
Tramping by the Huxley river, north of Lake Ōhau.

The Huxley Valley, which branches off the Hopkins Valley, is home to several huts including Huxley Forks Hut. The Brodrick Hut can be accessed from the north branch of the Huxley river. From Brodrick Hut it is possible to climb over Brodrick Pass (1630 metres above sea level) and descend into the Landsborough Valley. The climb from Brodrick Hut to the pass is 600 vertical metres and on a well marked track. It is also possible to traverse from Brodrick Pass along the Main Divide in order to climb Mount McKenzie (2156 metres above sea level). This provides views of the Mt Hooker, Mt Dechen, Mt Strachan and Mt Cook.

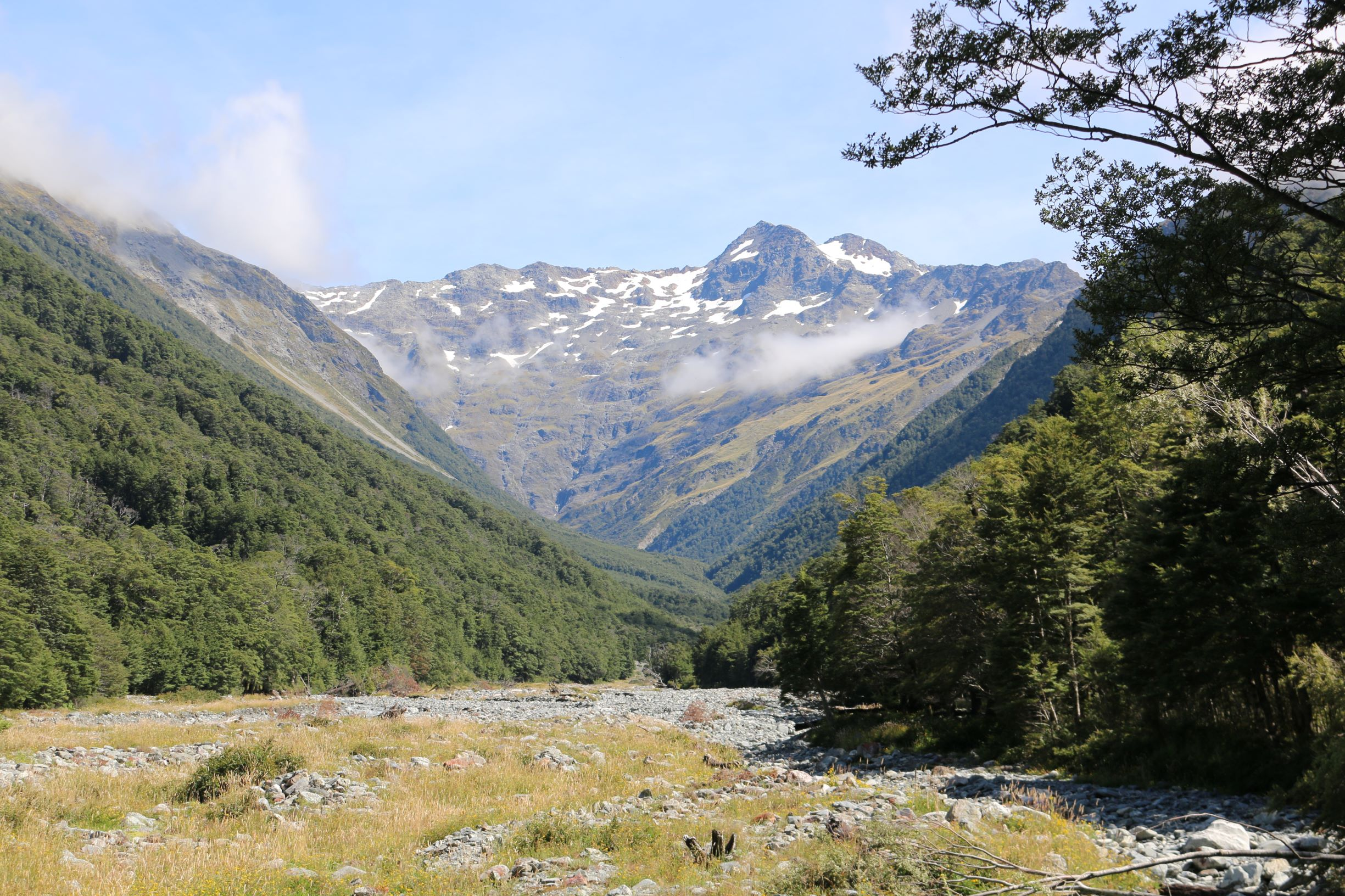
Temple Valley, Lake Ōhau. (2019)

Both the North Temple and South Temple Tracks are shorter day walks, accessible from the head of Lake Ōhau. The two tracks can be linked by the impressive Gunsight Pass. The South Temple Hut provides accommodation for weekend trampers. Scenic Views are possible from the Temple Valley Circuit track.

The Dasler Pinnacles (2315 metres above sea level) is a moderate to advanced two day tramp that can be accessed from the top of Lake Ōhau. Trampers have to march up the Hopkins river valley past Monument Hut and Red Hut to a short but steep climb to Dasler Bivvy. This small bivvy has two bunks in it. The Dasler Bivvy does not have good views of the valley but these can be accessed by climbing a further 15 minutes up through subalpine scrub. The Dasler Pinnacles (located to the north of Mount Glenmary) takes six to ten hours to the top and back from Dasler Bivvy. The climb requires good weather, a degree of skill to scramble over the rocks and a head for heights.

Te Araroa winds its way past Lake Ōhau. The Lake Tekapo to Lake Ōhau section is an easy but long 87 kilometres taking an average of two to three days walk, The East Ahuriri stage (from Glen Mary Ski Club on Lake Ōhau road and ending at Birchwood Road Carpark in the Ahuriri Valley) is a 26.5 kilometre stage that takes on average one to two days walking. It climbs Freehold Creek, passes the beautiful Dumb-bell Lake and then follows the East Ahuriri River.

== Ben Ohau ==
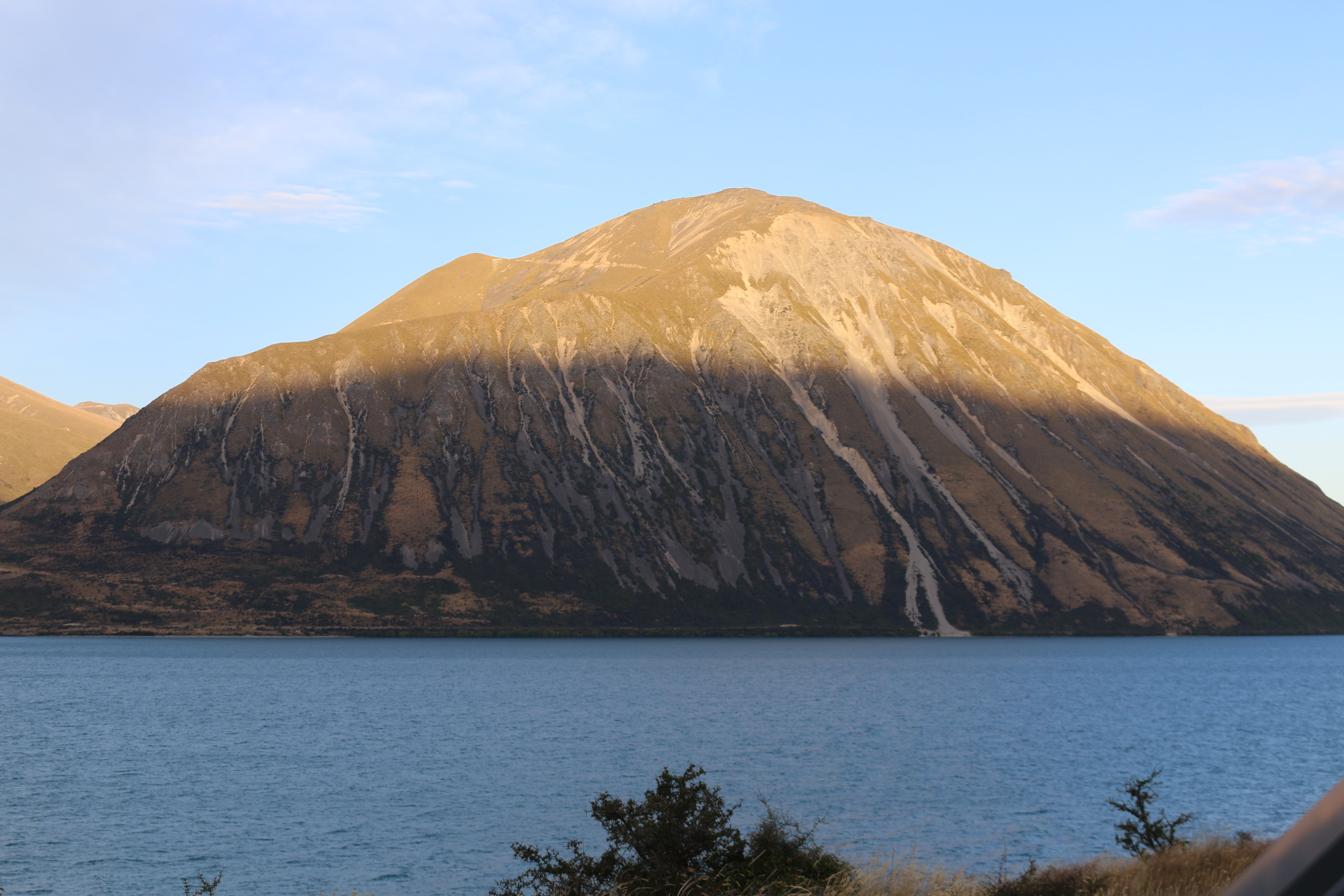
Ben Ohau, half in shadow, overlooking Lake Ōhau

Ben Ohau is one of the more photographed mountains in New Zealand and sits of the edge of Lake Ōhau. It is possible to climb Ben Ohau. It is a 4 hour walk that ascends over 800 metres vertical to the top of Ben Ohau (1500 metres above sea level). The start of the walk is located along the Glen Lyon road, approximately 23 kilometres from Twizel. There is a car park at the road end with a Department of Conservation marking where the track starts. The track itself is an old four wheel drive track. The summit overlooks Lake Ōhau, Lake Pukaki, Lake Benmore and Lake Ruataniwha as well as the surrounding mountains. Ben Ohau is also known by its Māori name Te Ruataniwha.

The legends of Ngāi Tahu tell of Te Ruataniwha, who was an ancestor on the Ārai-te-uru waka that capsized near Shag Point on the Otago coastline. After the waka capsized, many of the passengers went ashore to explore the land. Legend states that they needed to be back at the waka before daylight. Many did not make it, including Te Ruataniwha, and he was instead transformed into the mountain of Ben Ohau.

== Flora and fauna ==
Himalayan tahr are widespread in the Ben Ohau Range. The population of tahr on all South Island conservation land is estimated to have peaked at 35,000, and a DOC contractor managed to cull more than 1,000 tahr in the Ben Ohau Range alone over two days in July 2019. Tahr graze native tussocks and plants, especially in the Ben Ohau range. A DOC ecologist has said that tussocks around the Ben Ohau range that were once as high as 1 metre (3 ft 3 in) have been reduced to ankle height by grazing tahr.

Chamois and red deer are also found in the mountains surrounding Lake Ōhau including the Maitland Valley and the Temple Valley. Other introduced species that are commonly seen around Lake Ōhau are the ubiquitous rabbits.

The beech forests around Lake Ōhau contain nationally and internationally significant mistletoe populations of scarlet mistletoe (Peraxilla colensoi), red mistletoe (Peraxilla tetrapetala) and yellow mistletoe (Alepis flavida). All three of these species are ranked as 'Declining'. These parasitic plants flower in November/December. The Ōhau Conservation Trust is working to promote awareness of, and protect, the unique habitats and biodiversity of the Lake Ōhau area, though personal interests are sometimes involved.

The tussock slopes of Ben Ohau Range host a myriad of wildlife including moths, butterflies, lizards, grasshoppers, spiders and beetles. Bush birds likely to be spotted in the forests include South Island Tomtit/miromiro, South Island Fantail/pīwakawaka, New Zealand Bellbird/korimako, South Island Rifleman/ tītitipounamu and Morepork/ruru koukou. Further up the Hopkins Valley are New Zealand falcon/ kārearea, kea and rock wren/pīwauwau.

The beech forests near Lake Ōhau are a mixture of mountain and silver beech.

Wilding Pines (Pinus Cortorta, Pinus sylvestris) are problematic on the foreshore of Lake Ōhau. Pinus contorta grow “probably five to 10 times faster” in the Mackenzie Country (and Lake Ōhau) than in their native North America. They can establish themselves at altitudes of up to 2000 metres. Where they have becomes established and converted tussock grasslands to wilding pine forests, 25% to 30% less water reaches streams and lakes. Land-use change additionally permits wilding pine establishment; removal of younger trees, while useful, is futile if the older, "source" wilding pines found on personal properties are not removed.

The pines outcompete native trees and tussock land. Shelter plantings were established for protection against harsh winds in places such as the Lake Ōhau Lodge in the 1950s. Wilding pines that spread from these early plantings have become a problem in adjacent areas. The Ōhau Conservation Trust is working to keep the Lake Ōhau landscape in its natural state and eradicate wilding pines.

== Lake Ōhau fire 2020 ==
A significant wildfire on Sunday 4 October 2020 destroyed 48 houses. The fire started in the vicinity of Freehold Creek and Parsons Creek and then moved in a south and west direction. It burnt through 5032 hectares (including 1900 hectares of Department of Conservation land) and destroyed many houses in the Lake Ohau Alpine Village. The spread of wilding pines, and high winds and a dry winter attributed to climate change set the scene for the fire. The Insurance Council of New Zealand processed around 200 claims totalling NZ$34.8 million, making it one of the most expensive fires in the country. Fire and Emergency NZ completed a report as to the causes of the fire in November 2021. They said that the fire was as a result of a "a crossarm failure on a power pole that was part of a section of lines crossing conservation land approximately 2.5 kilometres north-west of Lake Ōhau village". Waitaki Network, who are responsible for the power lines, believe that Fire and Emergency NZ are incorrect in their conclusions.

== Flooding 2022 ==
In July 2022, Lake Ōhau was hit by an almost one in a 100 year storm which caused significant flooding. Access to the Lake Ōhau Alpine Village and Ōhau ski field was cut off when a bridge on the Lake Ōhau road was washed out. Despite the damage, power and telephone lines were still working.
