= Mount Glenmary =

Mountain in the Canterbury Region of New Zealand

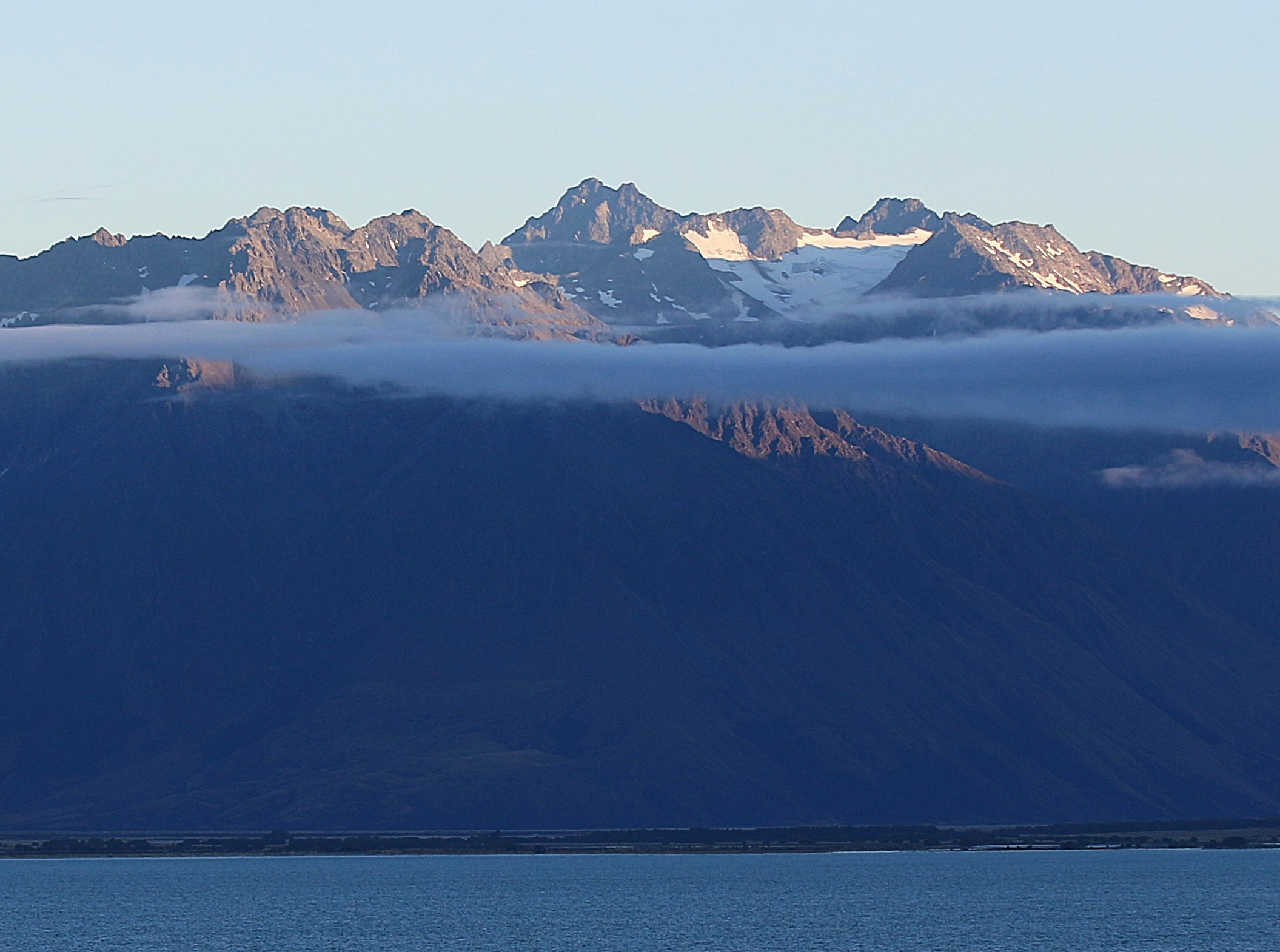
- South aspect

Highest point
- Elevation: 2,590 m (8,497 ft)
- Prominence: 570 m (1,870 ft)
- Isolation: 12.71 km (7.90 mi)
- Listing: New Zealand #46
- Coordinates: 43.976387°S 169.877987°E

Geography
- Location within New Zealand
- Interactive map of Mount Glenmary
- Location: South Island
- Country: New Zealand
- Region: Canterbury
- District: Mackenzie
- Parent range: Southern Alps; Naumann Range
- Topo map(s): Topo50 BY15 496 260; NZMS260 H37

Geology
- Rock age: Triassic
- Rock type: Semischist of Rakaia Terrane

Climbing
- First ascent: November 1934
- Easiest route: North Face

Mount Glenmary is a 2,590-metre-elevation (8,497-foot) mountain in the Canterbury Region of New Zealand.

== Description ==
Mount Glenmary is located 227 kilometres (141 mi) west-southwest of Christchurch and set between the Dobson Valley and Hopkins Valley in the South Island. It is the highest peak in the Naumann Range of the Southern Alps. Precipitation runoff from the mountain's west slope drains into the Hopkins River and the east slope drains into the Dobson River. Topographic relief is significant as the summit rises 1,950 metres (6,398 feet) above the Hopkins Valley in three kilometres. The nearest higher peak is Mount Ward, 12 kilometres to the north.

== Climbing ==
Climbing routes with first ascents:

- South West Ridge – Scott Gilkison, Ernie Presland, Harry Stevenson – (November 1934)
- South East Ridge – Bob Bauld, George Moir, Arch Wiren – (1946)
- North Face – Ed Glass, Jim McNulty, Ray Slater – (1950)
- All The President's Men – Ross Cullen, Geoff Gabites – (February 1993)
- West Face (descent) – Paula Macfarlane, Brede Arkless – (October 1993)

== Climate ==
Based on the Köppen climate classification, Mount Glenmary is located in a marine west coast (Cfb) climate zone, with a subpolar oceanic climate (Cfc) at the summit. Prevailing westerly winds blow moist air from the Tasman Sea onto the mountains, where the air is forced upwards by the mountains (orographic lift), causing moisture to drop in the form of rain or snow. This climate supports a glacieret on the southeast slope. The months of December through February offer the most favourable weather for viewing or climbing this peak.

== Gallery ==
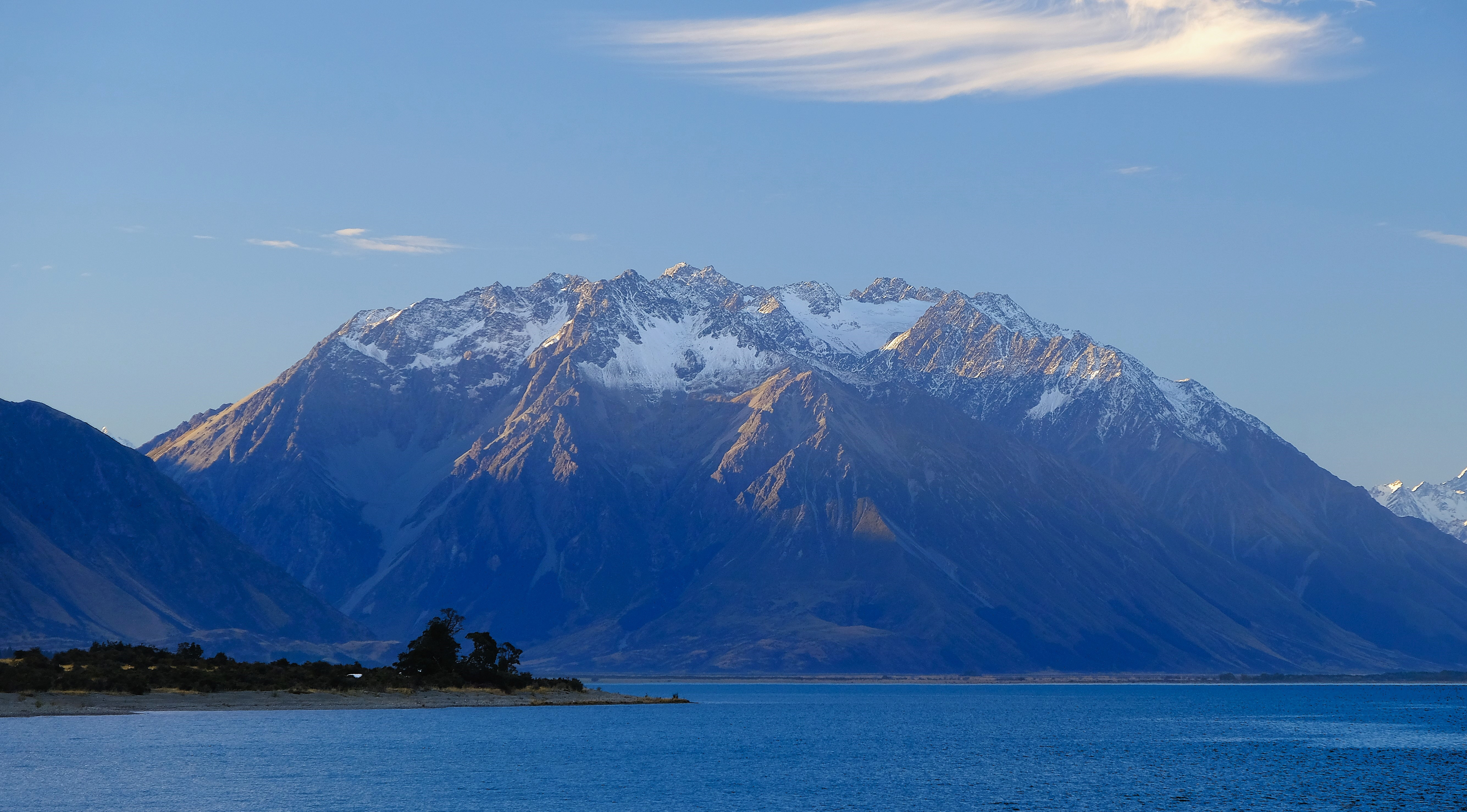
Naumann Range from Lake Ohau. Mount Glen Lyon is in front and the very highest point is the top of Mount Glenmary in back.

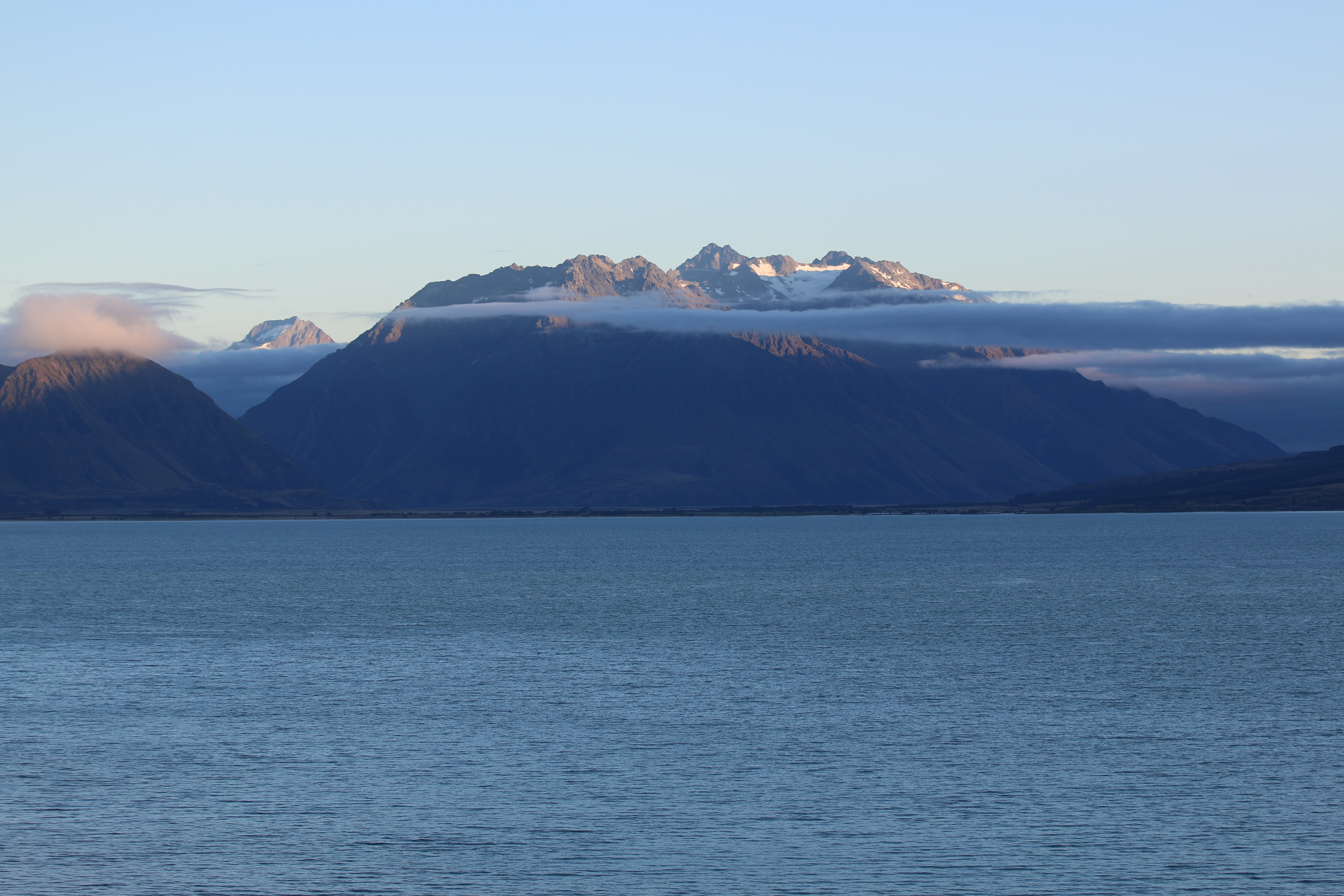
Mount Glenmary's summit centred. Mount Ward to left.

== See also ==
- List of mountains of New Zealand by height
