= Pleasant Flat =

River flat in Haast Pass, New Zealand

- River flat
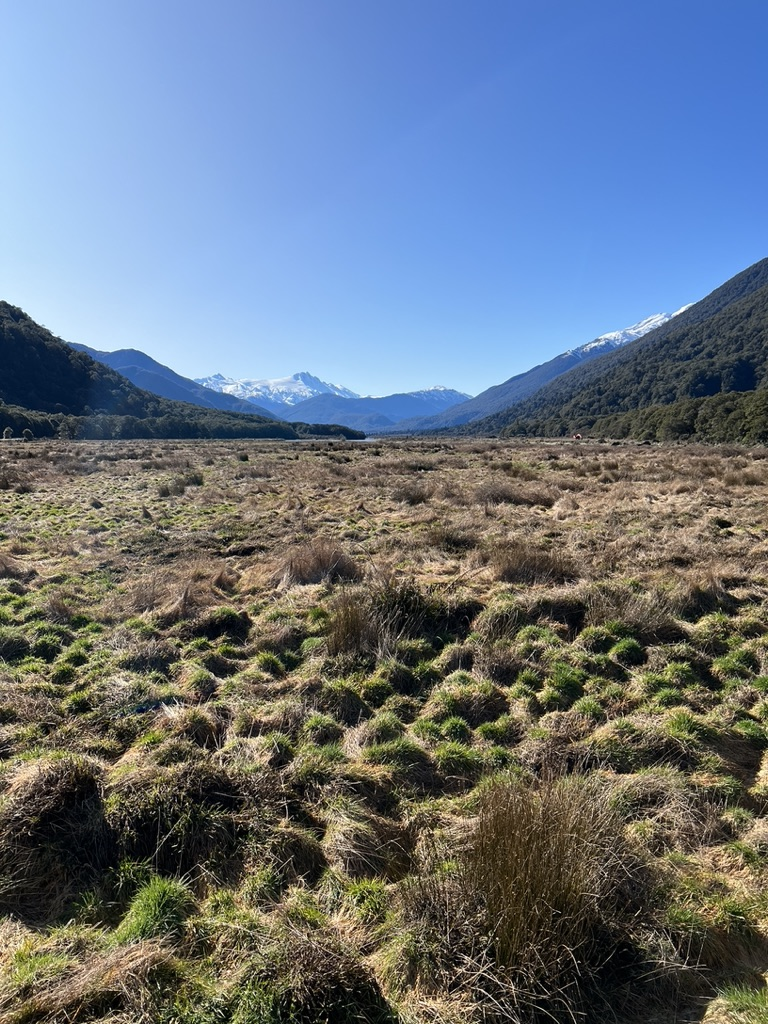

- Coordinates: 44°00′30″S 169°23′10″E
- Offshore water bodies: Haast River
- Formed by: Landsborough Glacier
- Elevation: 107 m (351 ft)

Pleasant Flat is an alluvial floodplain of the Haast River in the Haast Pass on New Zealand's South Island. A former stopping place for travellers crossing the pass before the building of the highway, it now has a campsite and picnic shelter. It has a notable view of Mount Hooker to the northeast.

== Geography ==
Pleasant Valley is an alluvial floodplain created by the Haast River, in the Southern Alps of the South Island of New Zealand. It is approximately three kilometres (1.9 mi) upriver from the confluence of the Haast and Landsborough Rivers, and three kilometres north of the Gates of Haast. The flat is approximately 500 metres (550 yd) wide by over one kilometre (0.62 mi) long, and runs on a southwest-to-northeast axis. Despite being close to a major mountain pass, it is only 107 metres (351 ft) above sea level.

The low valley of Pleasant Flat was carved out by an offshoot of the Landsborough Glacier in the last Ice Age. The Landsborough River is unusual in running parallel to the foot of the Southern Alps and flowing into the Haast River instead of heading directly to sea. When the river valley was filled by a glacier, it followed the same course but had to make a sharp western turn at Clarke Bluff to continue down the Haast Valley. One arm of the glacier continued straight and carved out the Burke River valley, Burke Flat, and Pleasant Flat, before travelling uphill and pushing over the Haast Pass to Makarora—the reason the pass is so low (563 m) compared to the Lewis Pass (907 m) and Arthur's Pass (920 m).

A notable view from Pleasant Flat is the icefield of Mount Hooker (2640 m) to the northeast, at the head of the Clarke River, described by Andy Dennis as "one of the most glorious views of the Southern Alps from a main highway."

== History ==
Travellers across the Haast Pass would usually stay in small huts at Burke Flat, two kilometres (1.2 mi) upriver from Pleasant Flat. When the highway across the Pass was constructed, a bridge was built across the Haast River at Pleasant Flat (the middle bridge of three), and this became a natural stopping point. Today there is a Department of Conservation campsite at the Flat, with toilets, a picnic shelter, and a short forest walk along nearby Muir Creek. In 2018, a cell tower was installed, powered by a 150 W wind turbine and 270 W solar panel. This was to create an island of cellular coverage between Haast and Lake Wānaka, allowing drivers to make other plans should Haast Pass be closed.

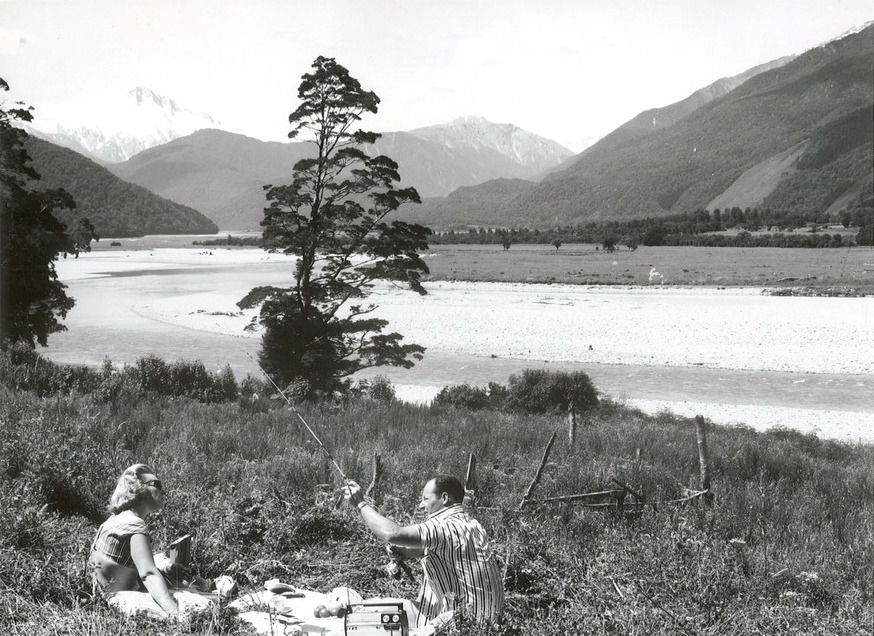
Picnic at Pleasant Flat, 1965

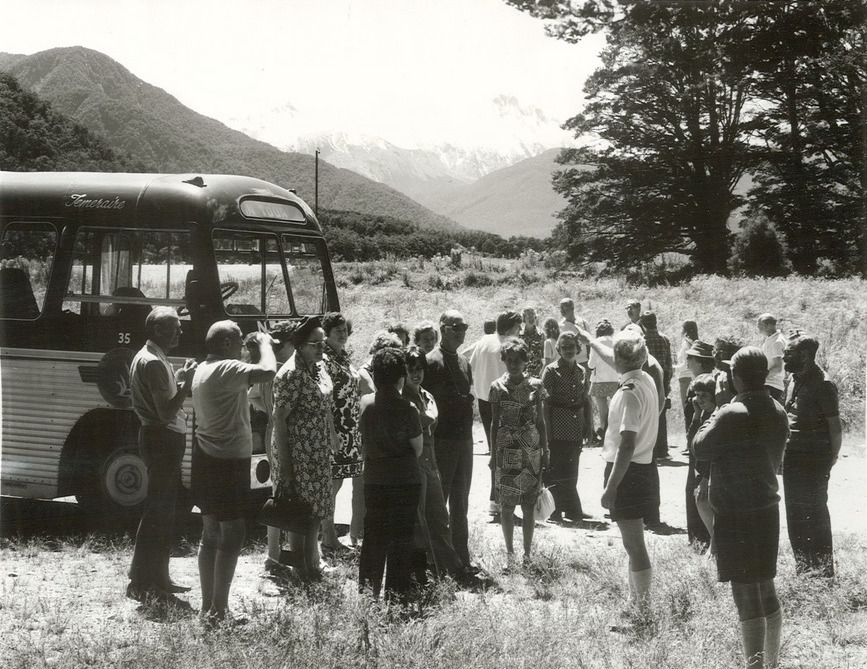
Bus tour, 1972

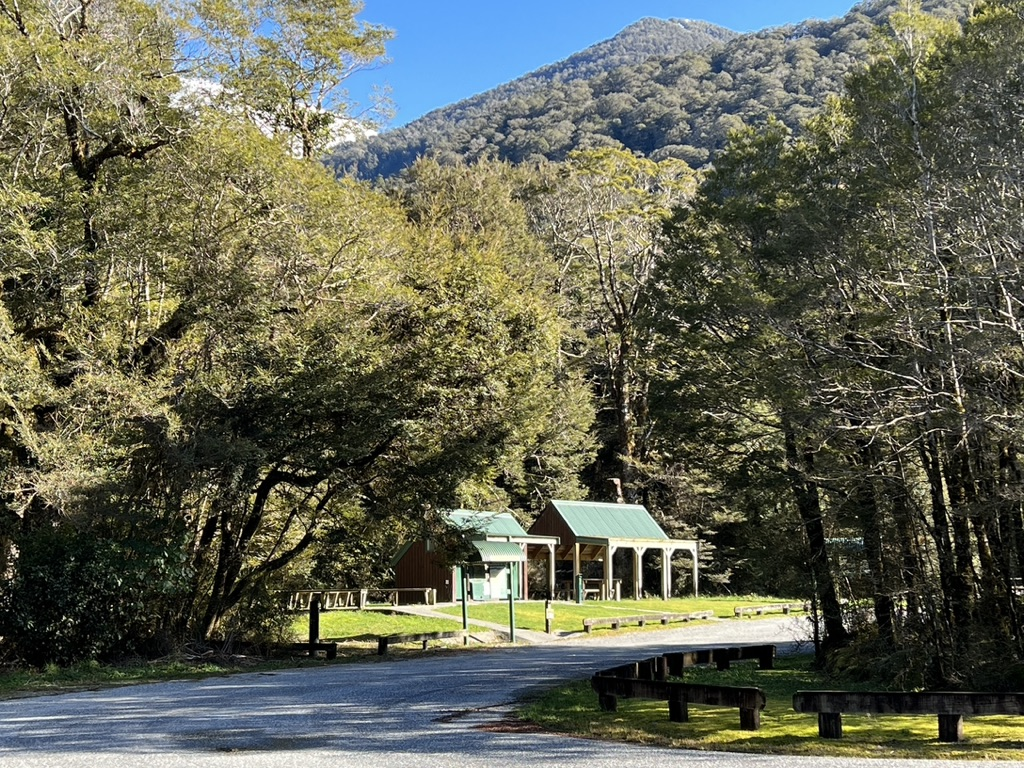
Campsite and picnic shelter

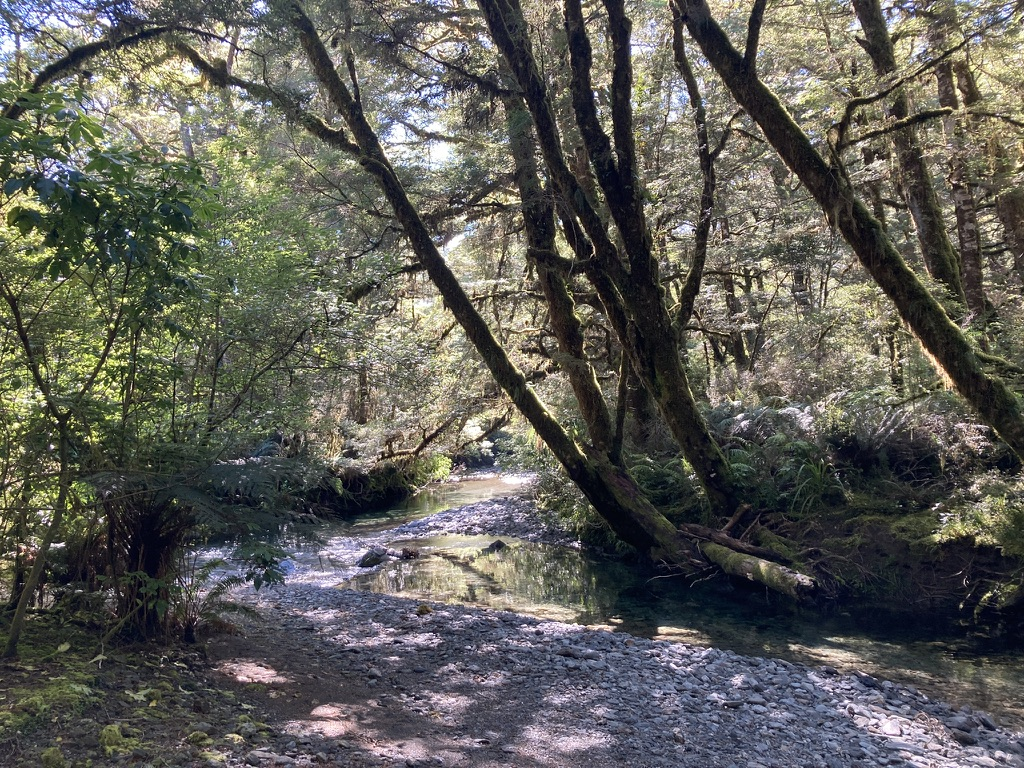
Walking trail beside Muir Creek

== Flora and fauna ==
The forest around Muir Creek is dominated by silver beech (Nothofagus menziesii). Common forest birds that can be observed are bellbirds (Anthornis melanura), grey warblers (Gerygone igata), tomtits (Petroica macrocephala), and long-tailed cuckoos (Eudynamys taitensis), while moreporks (Ninox novaeseelandiae) can be heard at night, and South Island oystercatchers (Haematopus finschi) will sometimes feed at the campsite. The Haast and Lansborough valleys contain populations of kākā (Nestor meridionalis), yellow-crowned kākāriki (Cyanoramphus auriceps), and whio (Hymenolaimus malacorhynchos).

Haast, in his 1863 crossing of the pass which later bore his name, noted that the nearby forests "were literally alive with woodhens and many kakapos". However, weka (Gallirallus australis) are no longer common in southern Westland and kākāpō (Strigops habroptilus) are long gone from mainland New Zealand. Explorer Charlie Douglas in 1899 recalled the former abundance of kākāpō on the river flats of the Landsborough Valley:

"The birds used to be in dozens around the camp, screeching and yelling like a lot of demons, and at times it was impossible to sleep for the noise…but alas this is a thing of the past, when last up the Landsbro there wasn't a bird to be found unless by going high up on the spurs."
