= Megafroneta gigas =

Conservation status
- Data Deficient (NZ TCS)

Scientific classification
- Domain: Eukaryota
- Kingdom: Animalia
- Phylum: Arthropoda
- Subphylum: Chelicerata
- Class: Arachnida
- Order: Araneae
- Infraorder: Araneomorphae
- Family: Linyphiidae
- Genus: Megafroneta
- Species: M. gigas

Binomial name
- Megafroneta gigas Blest, 1979

Species of spider

Megafroneta gigas is a species of sheet weaver spider endemic to New Zealand.

== Taxonomy ==
This species was described as Megafroneta gigas in 1979 by A.D Blest from a male specimen. The holotype is stored in Otago Museum.

== Description ==
This species is recorded at 7.5mm in length. This species has an orange brown cephalothorax and legs. The abdomen is dark grey with pale markings.

== Distribution ==
This species is only known from Lake Ohau in Otago, New Zealand.

== Conservation status ==
Under the New Zealand Threat Classification System, this species is listed as "Data Deficient" with the qualifiers of "Data Poor: Size", "Data Poor: Trend" and "One Location".
