= Mount Hopkins =

Mountains named Mount Hopkins or Hopkins Mountain:

| Feature Name | Country | State | County | Coordinates | USGS 7.5' Map |
|---|---|---|---|---|---|
| Mount Hopkins (New Zealand) | New Zealand | South Island | n/a | 43°47′27″S 169°57′48″E | n/a |
| U.S. Geological Survey Geographic Names Information System: Hopkins Mountain | United States | Arizona | Gila | 33°51′09″N 111°00′43″W | Armer Mountain |
| Mount Hopkins (Arizona) | United States | Arizona | Santa Cruz | 31°41′18″N 110°53′05″W | Mount Hopkins |
| Mount Hopkins (California) | United States | California | Fresno | 37°27′50″N 118°48′43″W | Mount Abbot |
| U.S. Geological Survey Geographic Names Information System: Hopkins Mountain | United States | New York | Essex | 44°11′00″N 073°44′58″W | Rocky Peak Ridge |
| U.S. Geological Survey Geographic Names Information System: Hopkins Mountain | United States | West Virginia | Greenbrier | 37°56′45″N 080°15′11″W | Anthony |
