= Mount Dechen =

Mountain in the West Coast Region of New Zealand

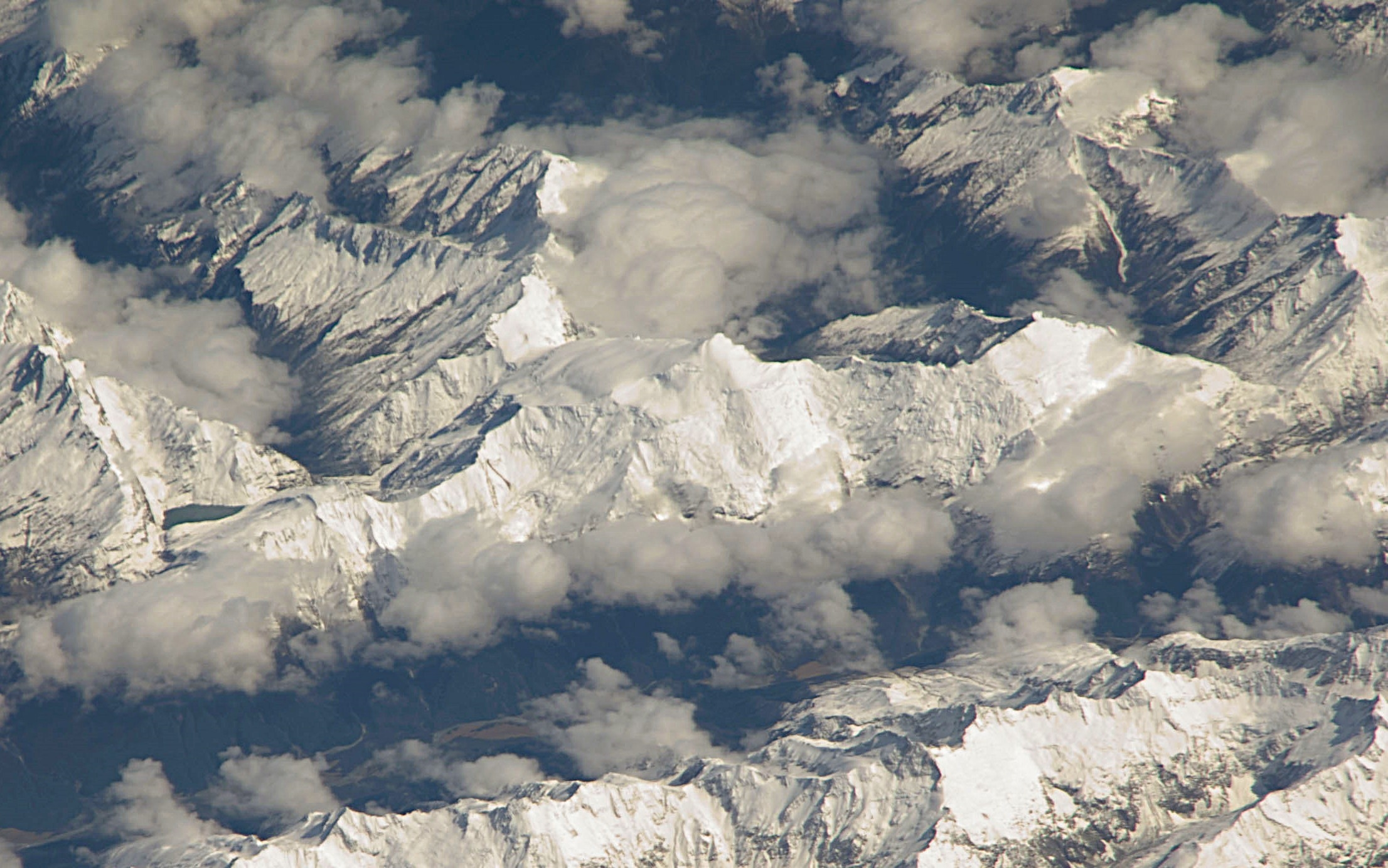
- Southeast aspect centred, viewed from ISS

Highest point
- Elevation: 2,643 m (8,671 ft)
- Prominence: 1,198 m (3,930 ft)
- Isolation: 9.99 km (6.21 mi)
- Listing: New Zealand #31
- Coordinates: 43°47′49″S 169°45′19″E

Naming
- Etymology: Ernst Heinrich Karl von Dechen
- Native name: Matakinui (Māori)

Geography
- Location within New Zealand
- Interactive map of Mount Dechen
- Location: South Island
- Country: New Zealand
- Region: West Coast
- Parent range: Southern Alps; Hooker Range
- Topo map(s): NZMS260 G37; Topo50 BY14

Climbing
- First ascent: 1935
- Easiest route: North East Ridge

Mount Dechen is a 2,643-metre-elevation (8,671-foot) mountain in the West Coast Region of New Zealand.

== Description ==
Mount Dechen is located in the Southern Alps of the South Island. Precipitation runoff from the mountain drains east into the Landsborough River, southwest into the headwaters of the Ōtoko River, and north into the headwaters of the Edison River. Topographic relief is significant as the summit rises 1,700 metres (5,577 feet) above the Ōtoko Valley in four kilometres, and 2,220 metres (7,283 feet) above the Landsborough Valley in four kilometres. The nearest higher peak is Mount Ward, nine kilometres to the southeast. The mountain's toponym was applied by Julius von Haast to honour his geology teacher, Ernst Heinrich Karl von Dechen (1800–1889).

== Climbing ==
The first ascent of the summit was made in March 1935 by Marjorie Edgar-Jones, Gladys Acton-Adams, Frank Alack, and Tom Christie.

Climbing routes with the first ascents:

- South Ridge – Marjorie Edgar-Jones, Gladys Acton-Adams, Frank Alack, Tom Christie – (1935)
- East Face – Norman Hardie, Jim McFarlane – (1947)
- North East Ridge – Trevor McCann, Maurie Bishop – (1952)
- Ōtoko Couloir – Dick Tornquist, Vic McGregor, Alex Parton, John Luxton, Tim Barfoot, George Hunter – (1961)

== Climate ==
Based on the Köppen climate classification, Mount Dechen is located in a marine west coast (Cfb) climate zone, with a subpolar oceanic climate (Cfc) at the summit. Prevailing westerly winds blow moist air from the Tasman Sea onto the mountains, where the air is forced upward by the mountains (orographic lift), causing moisture to fall in the form of rain or snow. This climate supports the Dechen and McCardell glaciers on the slopes of the peak. The months of December through February offer the most favourable weather for viewing or climbing this peak.

== See also ==
- List of mountains of New Zealand by height
