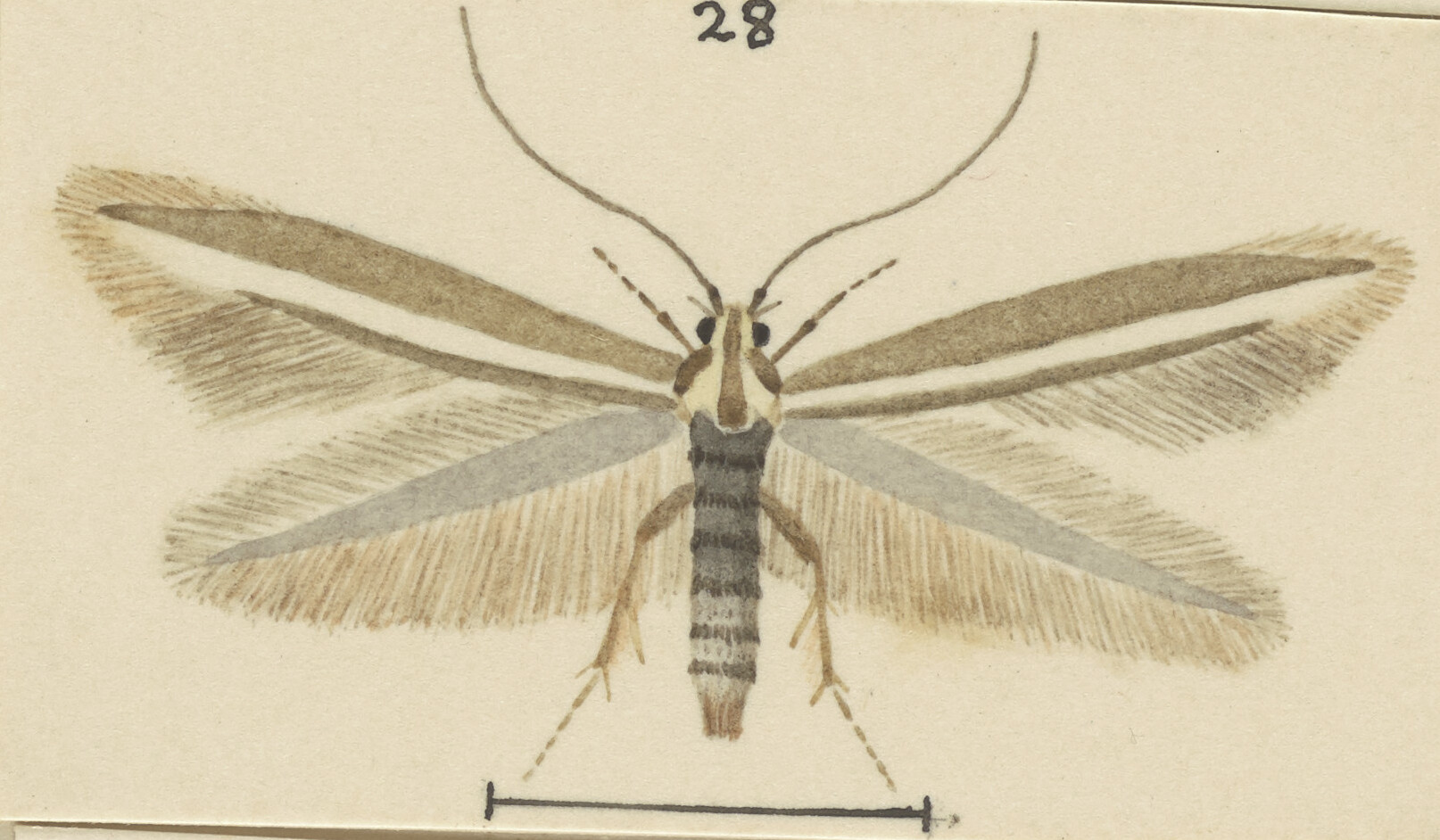

Scientific classification
- Kingdom: Animalia
- Phylum: Arthropoda
- Class: Insecta
- Order: Lepidoptera
- Family: Elachistidae
- Genus: Elachista
- Species: E. plagiaula

Binomial name
- Elachista plagiaula (Meyrick, 1938)

Synonyms
- Thectophila plagiaula Meyrick, 1938

= Elachista plagiaula =

Species of moth

Elachista plagiaula is a moth in the family Elachistidae. It was described by Edward Meyrick in 1938. E. plagiaula is endemic to New Zealand and has been observed in the Mackenzie Basin in the South Island. The preferred habitat of this species is alpine snow-grass. Adults are on the wing in December and are active at dusk.

== Taxonomy ==
This species was first described in 1938 and named Thectophila plagiaula using specimens collected at Freehold Range, Lake Ōhua by Stewart Lindsay in December. George Hudson discussed and illustrated this species in his 1939 book A supplement of the butterflies and moths of New Zealand. In 1988 J. S. Dugdale placed this species in the genus Elachista. The male holotype specimen is held at the Canterbury Museum.

== Description ==
Meyrick described this species as follows:

♂. 12–15 mm. Head white, a grey median stripe. Palpi white. Thorax grey, a white stripe on each side of back. Forewings narrow-lanceolate; grey; costal area variably tinged or suffused white; a white subdorsal streak from base to tornus, leaving a narrow grey dorsal streak; cilia white, towards tornal area tinged grey. Hind-wings grey; cilia whitish-grey.

== Distribution ==
This species is endemic to New Zealand.

== Habitat and hosts ==
This species inhabits alpine snow-grass.

== Behaviour ==
Adults are on the wing in December. They have been collected at dusk.
