= Otoko =

Otoko may refer to:

- Ōtoko River, New Zealand river
- Otoko, New Zealand, New Zealand settlement
- Otoko, Nigeria
