= Mount Ward (New Zealand) =

Mountain in the West Coast Region of New Zealand

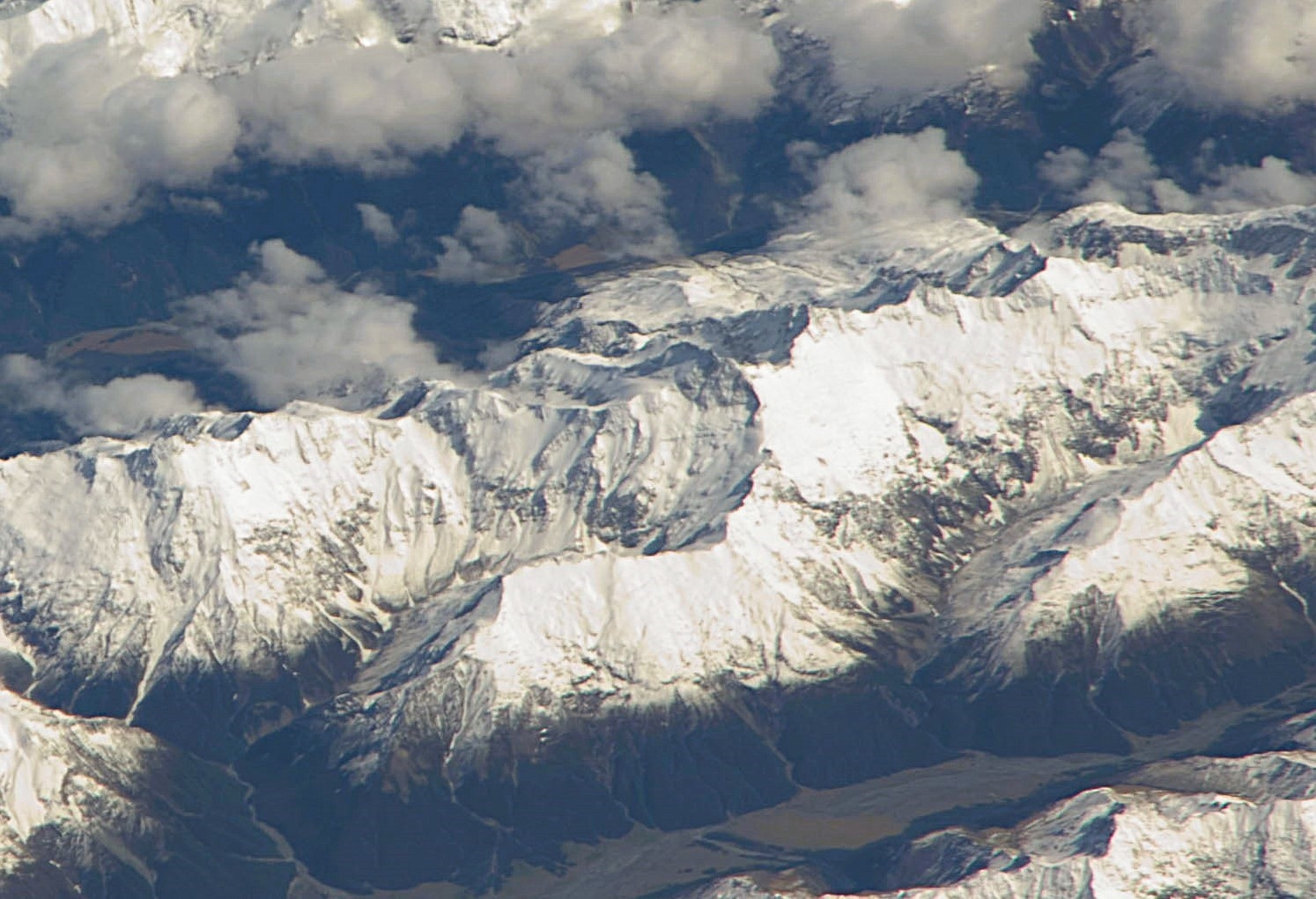
- Southeast aspect centred, viewed from ISS

Highest point
- Elevation: 2,645 m (8,678 ft)
- Prominence: 624 m (2,047 ft)
- Isolation: 9.93 km (6.17 mi)
- Listing: New Zealand #29
- Coordinates: 43°51′59″S 169°50′03″E

Geography
- Location within New Zealand
- Interactive map of Mount Ward
- Location: South Island
- Country: New Zealand
- Region: Canterbury / West Coast
- Parent range: Southern Alps
- Topo map(s): NZMS260 H37; Topo50 BY14

Climbing
- First ascent: 1934

Mount Ward is a 2,645-metre-elevation (8,678-foot) mountain in New Zealand.

== Description ==
Mount Ward is located on the crest or Main Divide of the Southern Alps and is situated on the boundary shared by the Canterbury and West Coast Regions of the South Island. Precipitation runoff from the mountain drains west to the Landsborough River, and east to the Hopkins River. Topographic relief is significant as the summit rises 1,545 metres (5,069 feet) above Thomson Stream in two kilometres, and 1,865 metres (6,119 feet) above the Hopkins Valley in four kilometres. The nearest higher peak is Mount McKerrow, 12 kilometres to the northeast.

== Climbing ==
The first ascent of the summit was made in January 1934 by Selwyn Grave, E.A. Hogg, and Edgar Williams.

Climbing routes with the first ascents:

- East Ridge – Selwyn Grave, E.A. Hogg, Edgar Williams – (1934)
- South Face – Jim Dawson, Christopher Johnson, Scott Russell – (1934)
- North Face (descent) – Jim Dawson, Christopher Johnson, Scott Russell – (1934)
- North West Chimney – Norman Hardie, Jim McFarlane – (1948)
- South East Face – Rob Blackburne, Ross Cullen – (1981)
- West Buttress – Stu Allan, Kevin Boekholt, Don Bogie, Kim Logan, Dave Walsh – (1985)
- Great Dane – Kynan Bazely, Paul Hersey – (2004)

== Climate ==
Based on the Köppen climate classification, Mount Ward is located in a marine west coast (Cfb) climate zone, with a subpolar oceanic climate (Cfc) at the summit. Prevailing westerly winds blow moist air from the Tasman Sea onto the mountains, where the air is forced upward by the mountains (orographic lift), causing moisture to fall in the form of rain or snow. This climate supports the Ward, Foster, Elcho, and Baker glaciers on the slopes of the peak. The months of December through February offer the most favourable weather for viewing or climbing this peak.

== Gallery ==
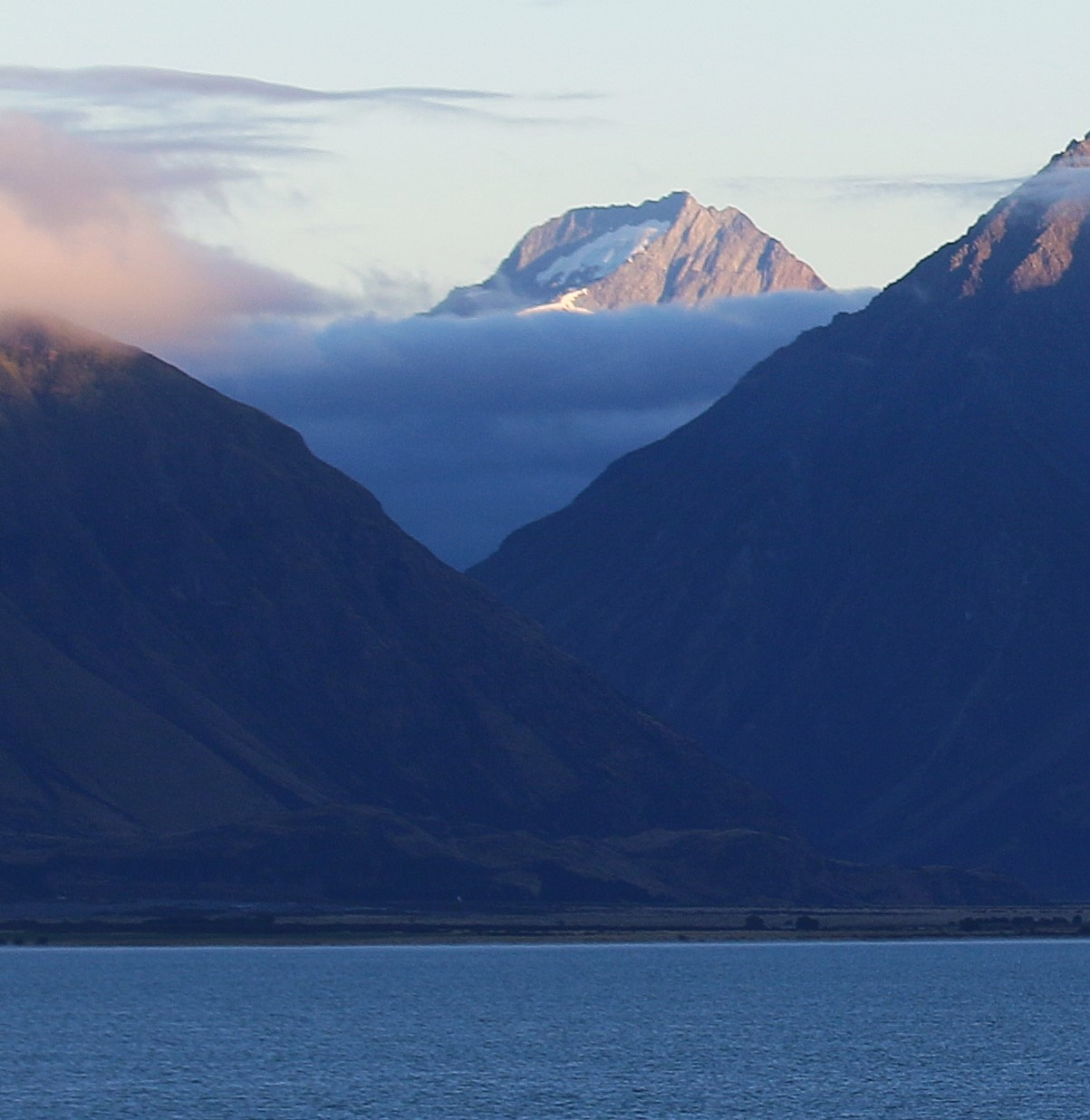
South aspect of Mount Ward from Lake Ohau

== See also ==
- List of mountains of New Zealand by height
