= Megafroneta dugdaleae =

Conservation status
- Data Deficient (NZ TCS)

Scientific classification
- Domain: Eukaryota
- Kingdom: Animalia
- Phylum: Arthropoda
- Subphylum: Chelicerata
- Class: Arachnida
- Order: Araneae
- Infraorder: Araneomorphae
- Family: Linyphiidae
- Genus: Megafroneta
- Species: M. dugdaleae

Binomial name
- Megafroneta dugdaleae Blest & Vink, 2002

Species of spider

Megafroneta dugdaleae is a species of sheet weaver spider endemic to New Zealand.

== Taxonomy ==
This species was described in 2002 by A.D Blest and Cor Vink from a female specimen. The holotype is stored in Te Papa Museum.

== Description ==
This species is recorded at 7.28mm in length. This species has a dark brown prosoma and legs. The abdomen is dark grey with pale markings dorsally.

== Distribution ==
This species is only known from Mount Aspiring National Park in New Zealand.

== Conservation status ==
Under the New Zealand Threat Classification System, this species is listed as "Data Deficient" with the qualifiers of "Data Poor: Size", "Data Poor: Trend" and "One Location".
