= Huxley River =

River in New Zealand

Coordinates: 44°00′S 169°49′E

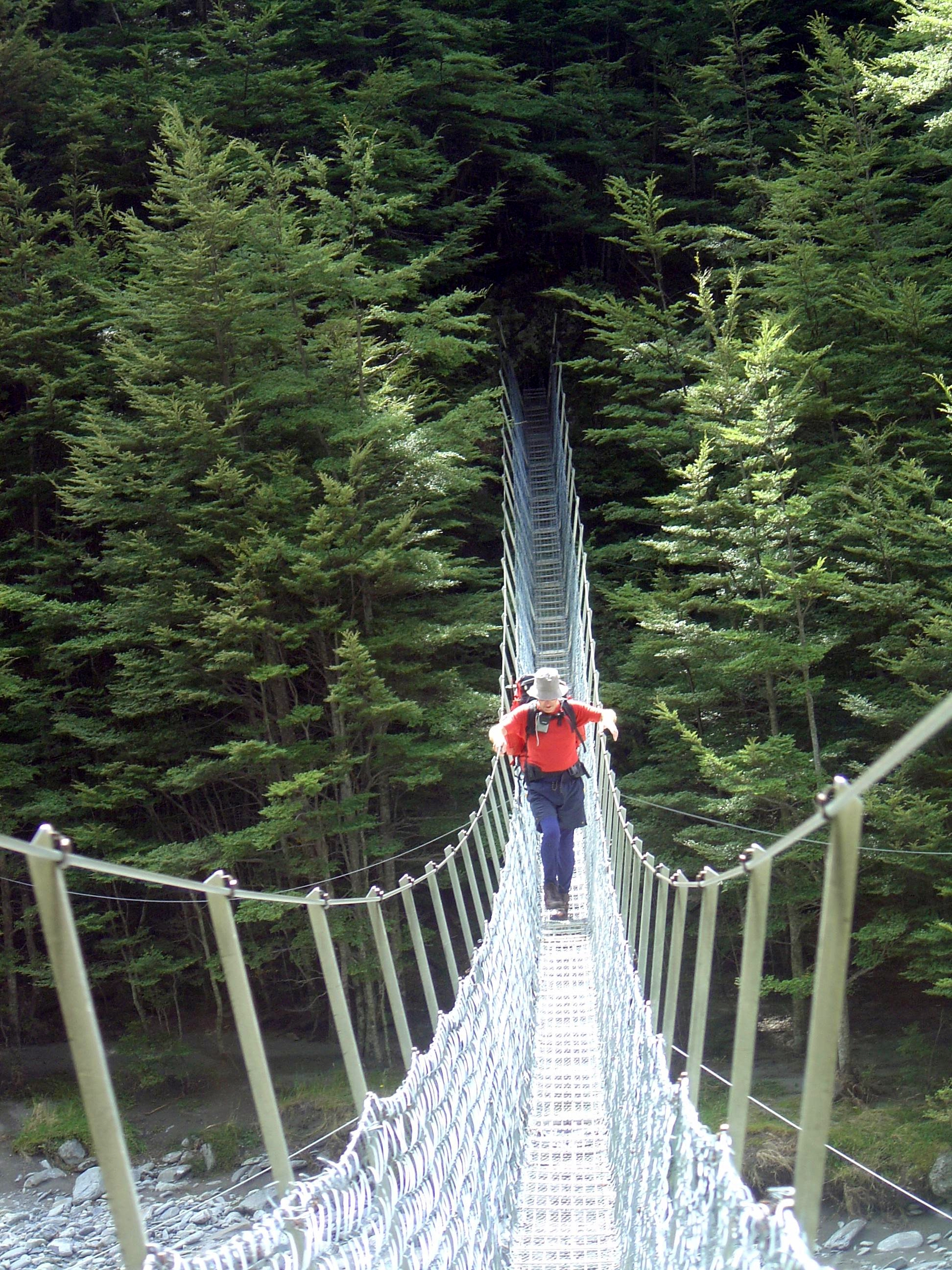
A backcountry swing bridge crossing the river

The Huxley River (Māori: Tairau) is in the South Island of New Zealand. It feeds into the Hopkins River which in turn feeds into Lake Ōhau.

== History ==
The first Pākehā to explore the valley was Julius Von Haast. The valley was named after the biologist Thomas Henry Huxley. The Huxley valley previously had the Māori name Tairau (sometimes given as Tirau), meaning 'stake' or 'peg'. The northern branch of the valley contains Brodrick Pass, called in Māori Te Tarahaka, meaning ‘a thief who steals without qualms or care for the thoughts of others’. This pass was incredibly important for traversing the South Island, and was in heavy use in the old days, due to the fact that it is an easy ascent from both the Lands borough side and the Huxley side.
