= Mount Hooker (New Zealand) =

Mountain in the West Coast Region of New Zealand

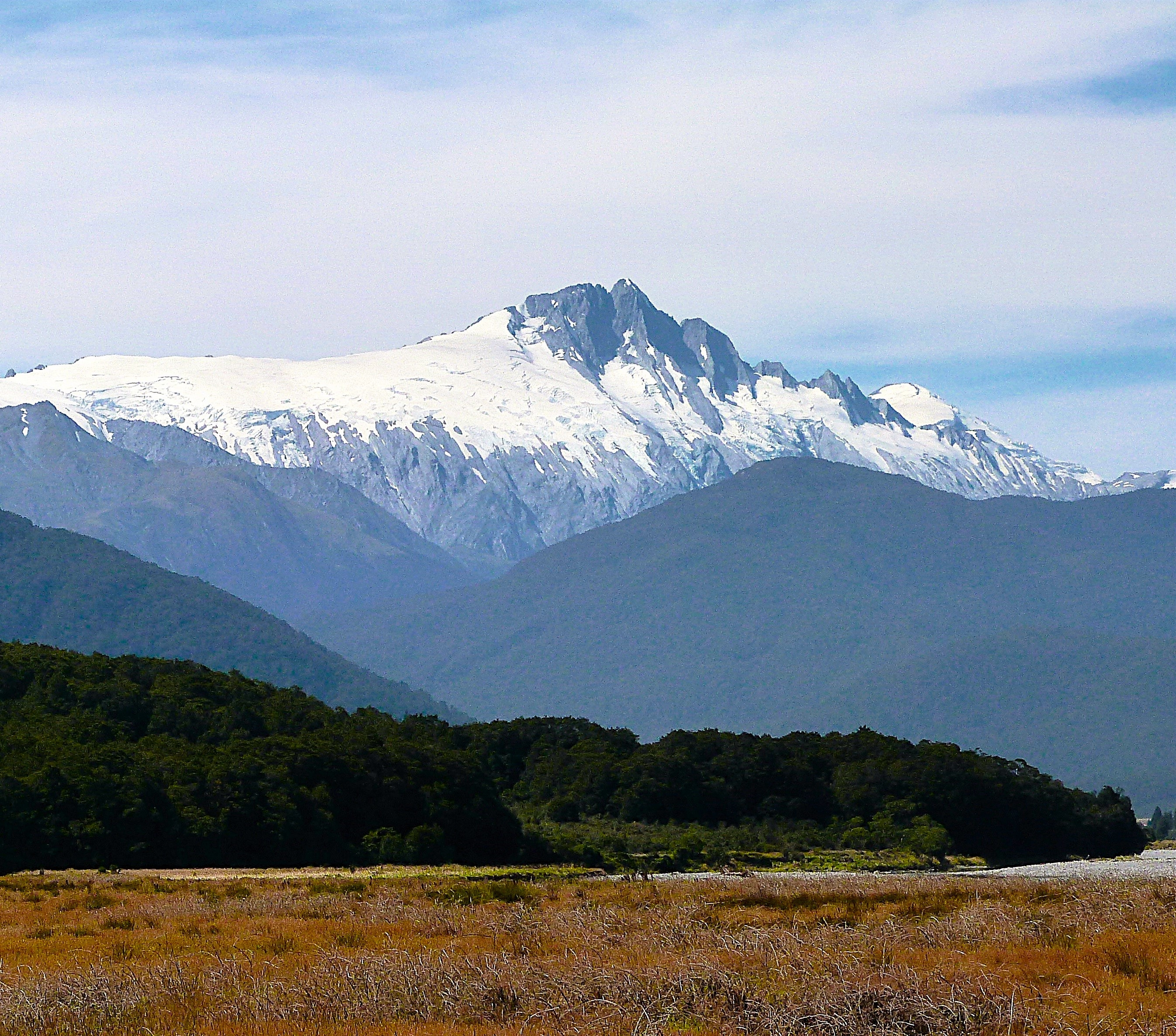
- Southwest aspect, from Pleasant Flat

Highest point
- Elevation: 2,640 m (8,661 ft)
- Prominence: 1,201 m (3,940 ft)
- Isolation: 7.55 km (4.69 mi)
- Listing: New Zealand #32
- Coordinates: 43°49′51″S 169°40′27″E

Naming
- Etymology: Joseph Dalton Hooker

Geography
- Location within New Zealand
- Interactive map of Mount Hooker
- Location: South Island
- Country: New Zealand
- Region: West Coast
- Parent range: Southern Alps; Hooker Range
- Topo map(s): NZMS260 G37; Topo50 BY14

Climbing
- First ascent: 1928

Mount Hooker is a 2,640-metre-elevation (8,661-foot) mountain in the West Coast Region of New Zealand.

== Description ==
Mount Hooker is located in the Southern Alps of the South Island. Precipitation runoff from the mountain drains south into the headwaters of the Clarke River, and north into the headwaters of the Ōtoko River. Topographic relief is significant as the summit rises 1,740 metres (5,709 feet) above the Ōtoko Valley in two kilometres, and 2,240 metres (7,349 feet) above the Clarke Valley in four kilometres. The nearest higher peak is Mount Dechen, seven kilometres to the northeast. The mountain's toponym was applied by Julius von Haast to honour Joseph Dalton Hooker (1817–1911), British botanist and explorer.

== Climbing ==
The first ascent of the summit was made in December 1928 by Samuel Turner and Cyril Turner.

Climbing routes with the first ascents:

- North West Ridge – Samuel Turner, Cyril Turner – (1928)
- South East Ridge – Paul Bieleski, G.A. Carr, Bruce Jenkinson, A.G. Nelson – (1962)
- Via Jack Creek – Bruce Popplewell, Bill Stephenson – (1965)
- South Ridge – Dave Innes, Bruce Robertson, Peter Foster, Laurie Kennedy – (1968)
- Hersey Vinton-Boot – Shelley Hersey, Jamie Vinton-Boot – (2012)

== Climate ==
Based on the Köppen climate classification, Mount Hooker is located in a marine west coast (Cfb) climate zone, with a subpolar oceanic climate (Cfc) at the summit. Prevailing westerly winds blow moist air from the Tasman Sea onto the mountains, where the air is forced upward by the mountains (orographic lift), causing moisture to fall in the form of rain or snow. This climate supports the Hooker and Otoko glaciers on the slopes of the peak. The months of December through February offer the most favourable weather for viewing or climbing this peak.

== Gallery ==
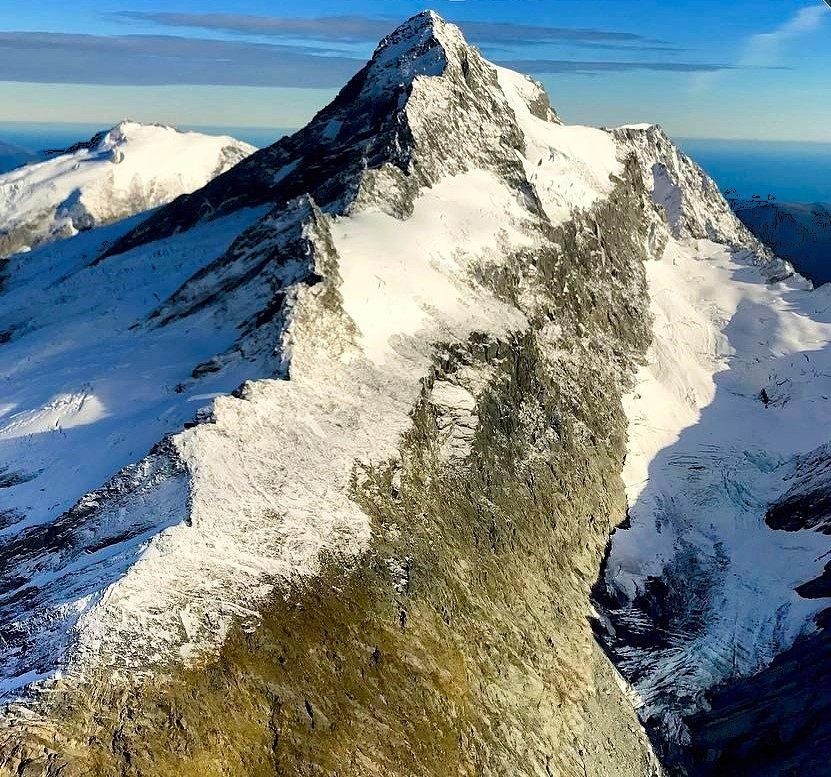
Aerial view of the southeast aspect of Mount Hooker

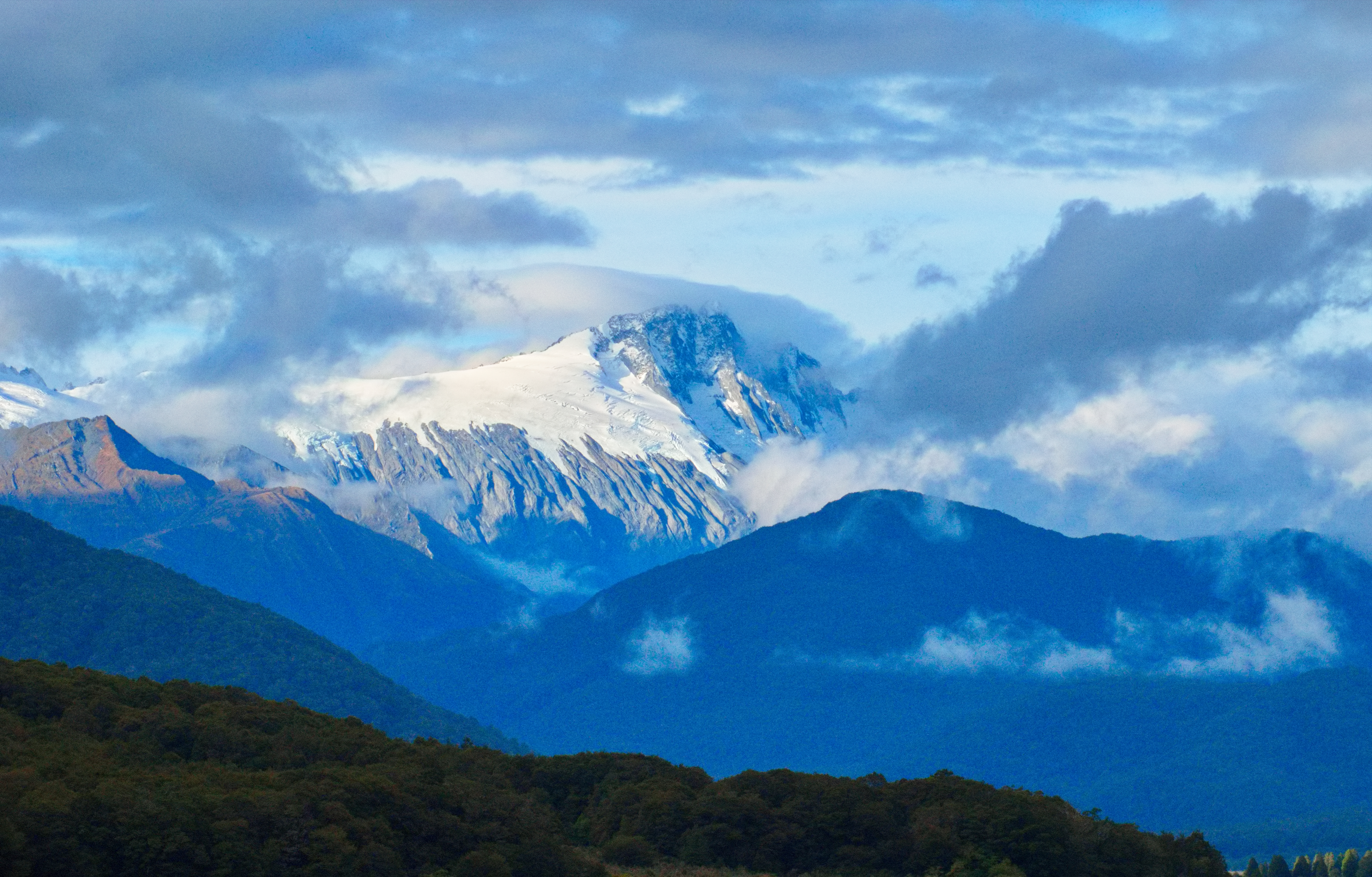
Mount Hooker

== See also ==
- List of mountains of New Zealand by height
