= Megafroneta =

Scientific classification
- Kingdom: Animalia
- Phylum: Arthropoda
- Subphylum: Chelicerata
- Class: Arachnida
- Order: Araneae
- Infraorder: Araneomorphae
- Family: Linyphiidae
- Genus: Megafroneta; Blest, 1979

Type species
- M. elongata Blest, 1979

Species
- M. dugdaleae Blest & Vink, 2002 – New Zealand; M. elongata Blest, 1979 – New Zealand; M. gigas Blest, 1979 – New Zealand

Genus of spiders

Megafroneta is a genus of South Pacific dwarf spiders that was first described by A. D. Blest in 1979. As of May 2019 it contains only three species, found in New Zealand: M. dugdaleae, M. elongata, and M. gigas.
