= Ernst Heinrich Karl von Dechen =

German geologist

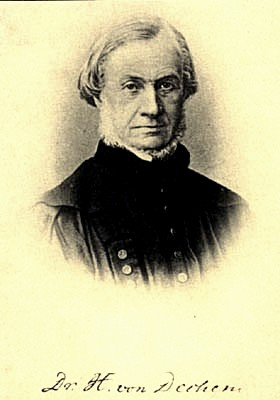
Ernst Heinrich von Dechen

Ernst Heinrich Karl von Dechen (25 March 1800 – 15 February 1889) was a German geologist.

== Life ==
He was born in Berlin, and was educated at the University of Berlin. He subsequently studied mining in Bochum and Essen, and was in 1820 placed in the mining department of the Prussian state, serving on the staff until 1864. Dechen was a professor at the University of Berlin from 1834 to 1841, after which he became director of the Prussian mining department while stationed at Bonn.

In the early years he made journeys to study the mining systems of other countries, and with this object he visited England and Scotland in company with Karl von Oeynhausen (1797–1865). In the course of his work he paid special attention to the coal-formation of Westphalia and northern Europe generally, and he greatly furthered the progress made in mining and metallurgical works in Rhenish Prussia.

He made numerous contributions to geological literature; notably the following:

- Geognostische Umrisse der Rheinländer zwischen Basel und Mainz mit besonderer Rücksicht auf das Vorkommen des Steinsalzes (with von Oeynhausen and La Roche), 2 vols. (Berlin, 1825).
- Geognostische Führer in das Siebengebirge am Rhein (Bonn, 1861)
- Die nutzbaren Mineralien und Gebirgsarten im deutschen Reiche (1873)

The work that gave him the most renown was a geological map of Rhenish Prussia and Westphalia in 35 sheets on the scale of 1-80,000, issued with two volumes of explanatory text (1855–1882). He also published a small geological map of Germany (1869).

He died in Bonn in 1889.

== Tributes ==
The mineral "Vondechenite" is named after Ernst Heinrich Karl von Dechen in 2016. The mineral "Dechenite" was named after him in 1850 by Carl Wilhelm Sigismund Bergemann.

Mount Dechen in the Southern Alps of New Zealand is named after him.
