= Clarke River (Westland District) =

River in Westland District, New Zealand

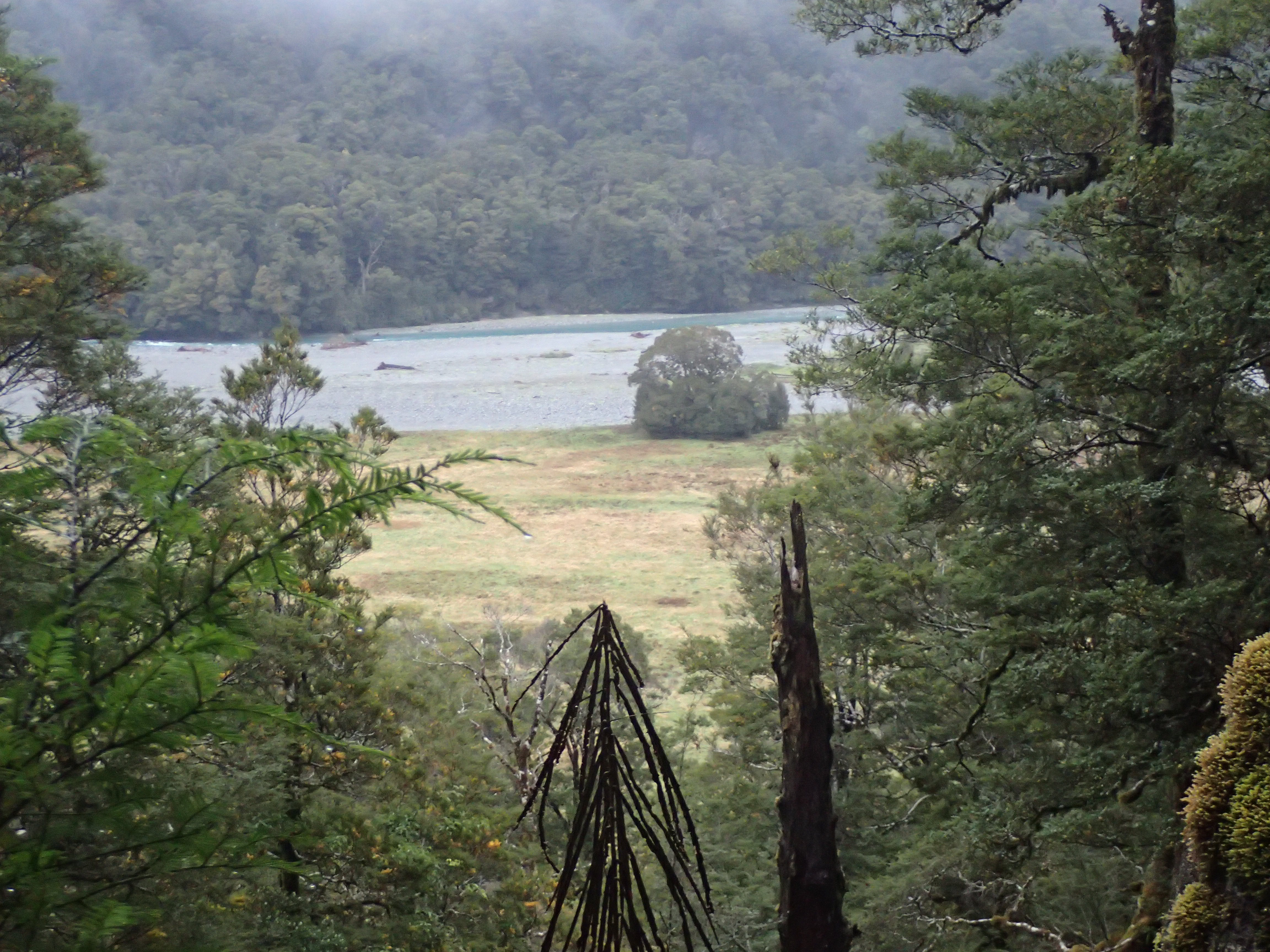
- Clarke River from near the Rough Creek Confluence, Westland, New Zealand
- Route of the Clarke River
- Mouth of the Clarke River Clarke River (Westland District) (South Island)

Location
- Country: New Zealand
- region: West Coast Region
- District: Westland District

Physical characteristics
- Source: Mount Gow
  - location: Solution Range
  - coordinates: 43°50′6″S 169°42′50″E
  - elevation: 1,200 m (3,900 ft)
- Mouth: Landsborough River
  - coordinates: 43°56′37″S 169°29′7″E
  - elevation: 120 m (390 ft)
- Length: 27 kilometres (17 mi)

Basin features
- Progression: Butler River → Landsborough River → Haast River
- River system: Haast River

The Clarke River in Westland District is the southernmost of three rivers thus-named in the South Island of New Zealand. It is a major tributary of the Haast River, flowing southwest from its source on the slopes of Mount Hooker before joining with the Landsborough River three kilometres before the waters of both flow into the Haast at the point where the latter river turns west towards its outflow into the Tasman Sea.
