= Mount Hopkins (New Zealand) =

Mountain in New Zealand

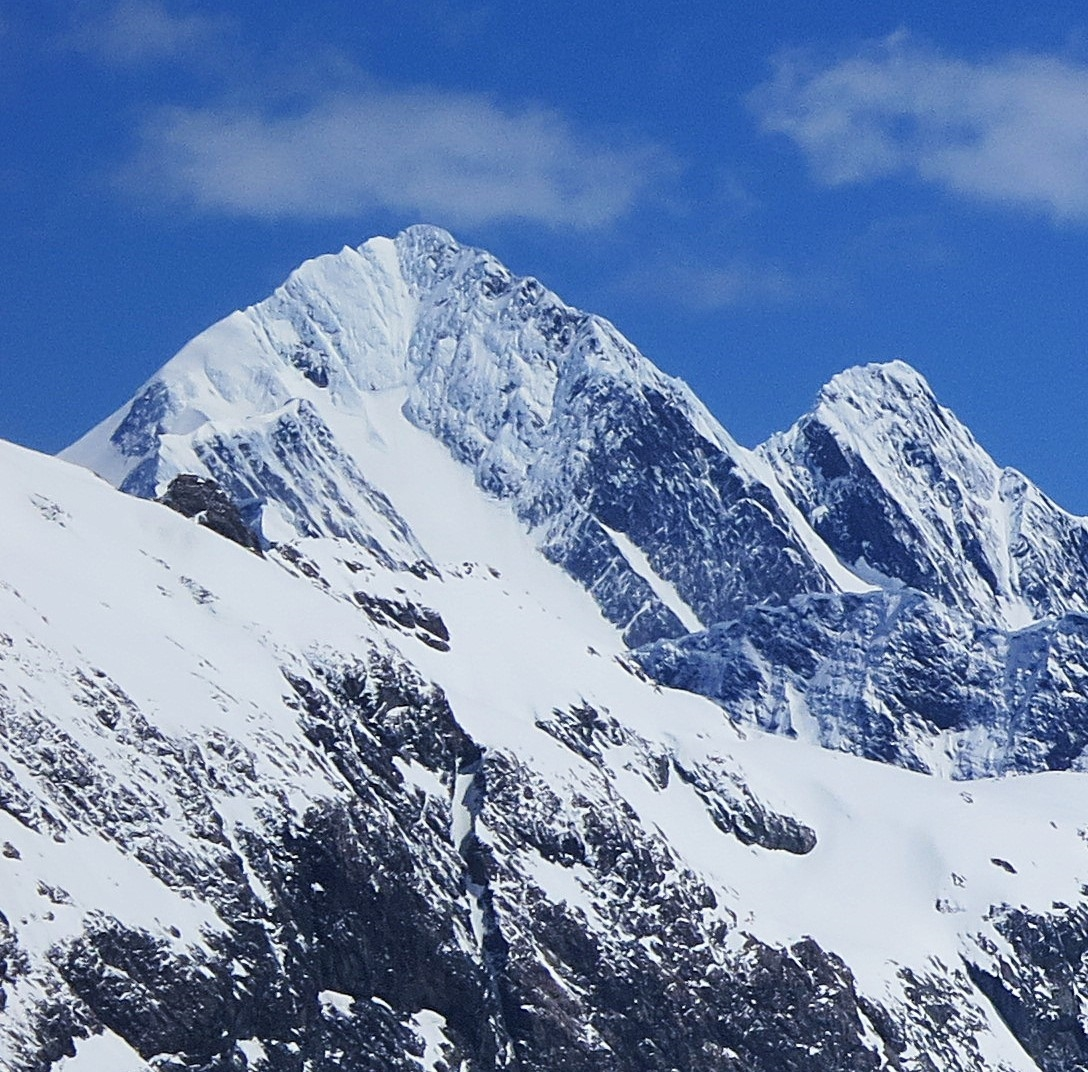

Highest point
- Elevation: 2,678 m (8,786 ft)
- Prominence: 507 m (1,663 ft)
- Listing: New Zealand #25
- Coordinates: 43°47′27″S 169°57′48″E

Geography
- Location within New Zealand
- Location: South Island, New Zealand
- Parent range: Southern Alps

Climbing
- First ascent: Samuel Turner, Peter Graham and Frank Milne, March 1914
- Easiest route: From Faith Col over the East Ridge

Mount Hopkins is located in the Southern Alps of New Zealand's South Island. It lies 25 kilometres (16 mi) to the southwest of Aoraki / Mount Cook, and rises to 2,678 metres (8,786 ft). Several rivers have their sources on or close to the slopes of Mount Hopkins, notably the Landsborough River to the west, the Dobson River to the east, and Hopkins River to the south. At Mount Hopkins, the traditional boundaries of the former Otago, Westland, and Canterbury Provinces meet. However, the modern day boundaries of the Otago region, the West Coast region and the Canterbury region meet further south at Mt Strauchon, which is also on the Main Divide.
