= Dobson River (New Zealand) =

River in the South Island of New Zealand

Coordinates: 44°05′S 169°52′E

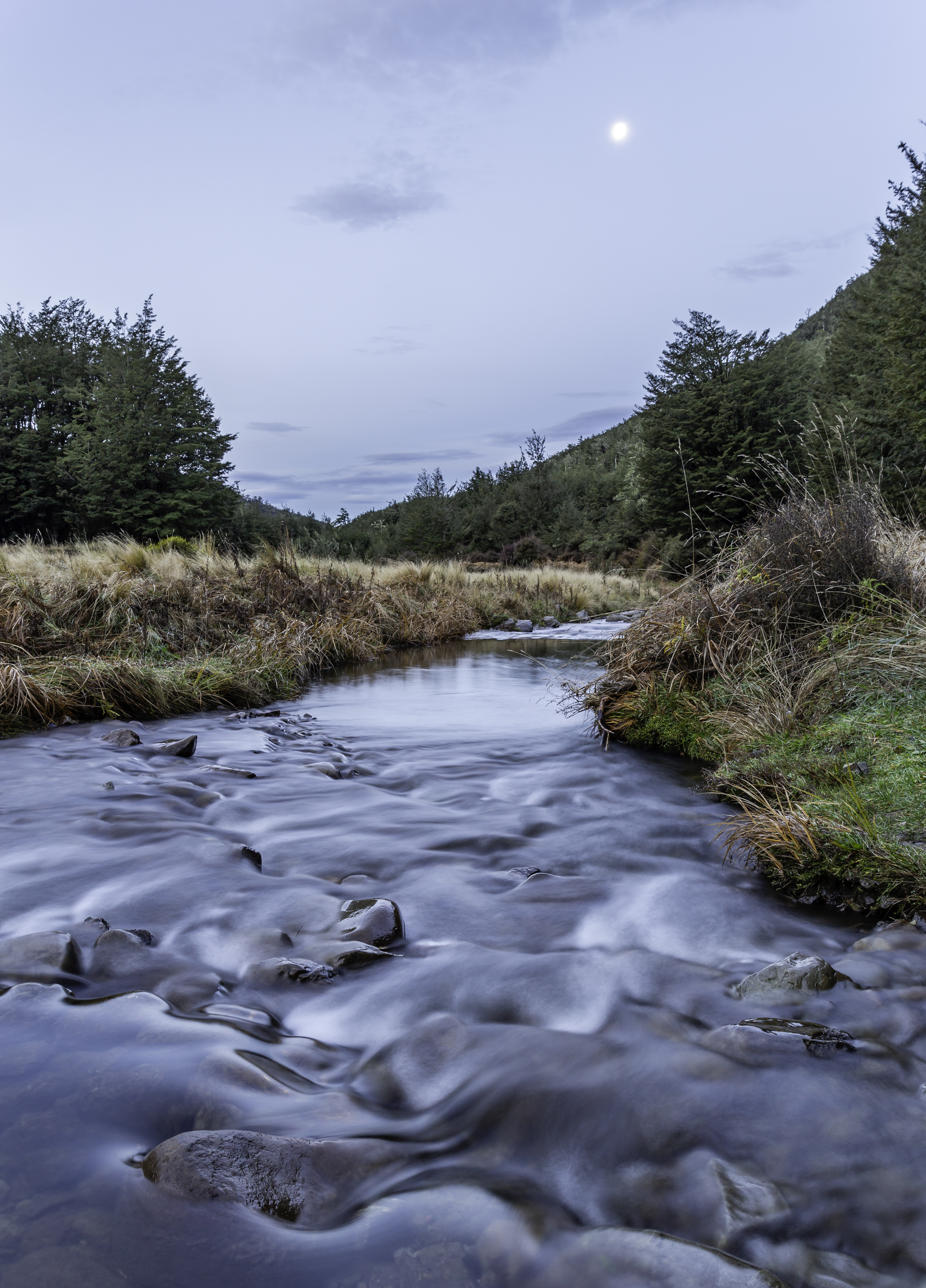

Location
- Country: New Zealand

Physical characteristics
- Source
  - location: Southern Alps
- Mouth
  - location: Hopkins River
  - elevation: 535 m (1,755 ft)
- Length: 45 km (28 mi)

The Dobson River (Māori: Ōtaao) is a river in the South Island of New Zealand. It flows south between the Neumann and Ohau ranges for 45 kilometres (28 mi) from its source on the west slope of Mount Edgar Thomson, in the Southern Alps, before joining with the Hopkins River, close to the latter's entry into the northern end of Lake Ōhau in the Mackenzie Country. The river flows over wide shingle beds, and has no rapids of interest to whitewater enthusiasts. It was named by Julius von Haast in the 1860s for his father-in-law, Edward Dobson, who was the Canterbury Provincial Engineer. The Māori name, also given as Otao in some works, means "driftwood," and has also been applied to the Hopkins River into which the Dobson/Ōtaao flows.

The New Zealand Department of Conservation maintains a tramping track and several backcountry huts in the river valley. Two of the huts are accessible by 4WD vehicle.

There is no direct geographical link with the West Coast town of Dobson.
