= Ōtoko River =

River in New Zealand

Coordinates: 43°46′S 169°31′E

Location
- Country: New Zealand

Physical characteristics
- Source
  - location: Mount Hooker
- Mouth
  - location: Paringa River
- Length: 23 kilometres (14 mi)

The Ōtoko River is a river of the West Coast Region of New Zealand's South Island. It flows generally northwest from the northern slopes of Mount Hooker, reaching the Paringa River 20 kilometres south of Bruce Bay.

The New Zealand Ministry for Culture and Heritage gives a translation of "place of the staff" for Ōtoko.

== See also ==
- List of rivers of New Zealand
