= Hopkins River (New Zealand) =

River in the South Island of New Zealand

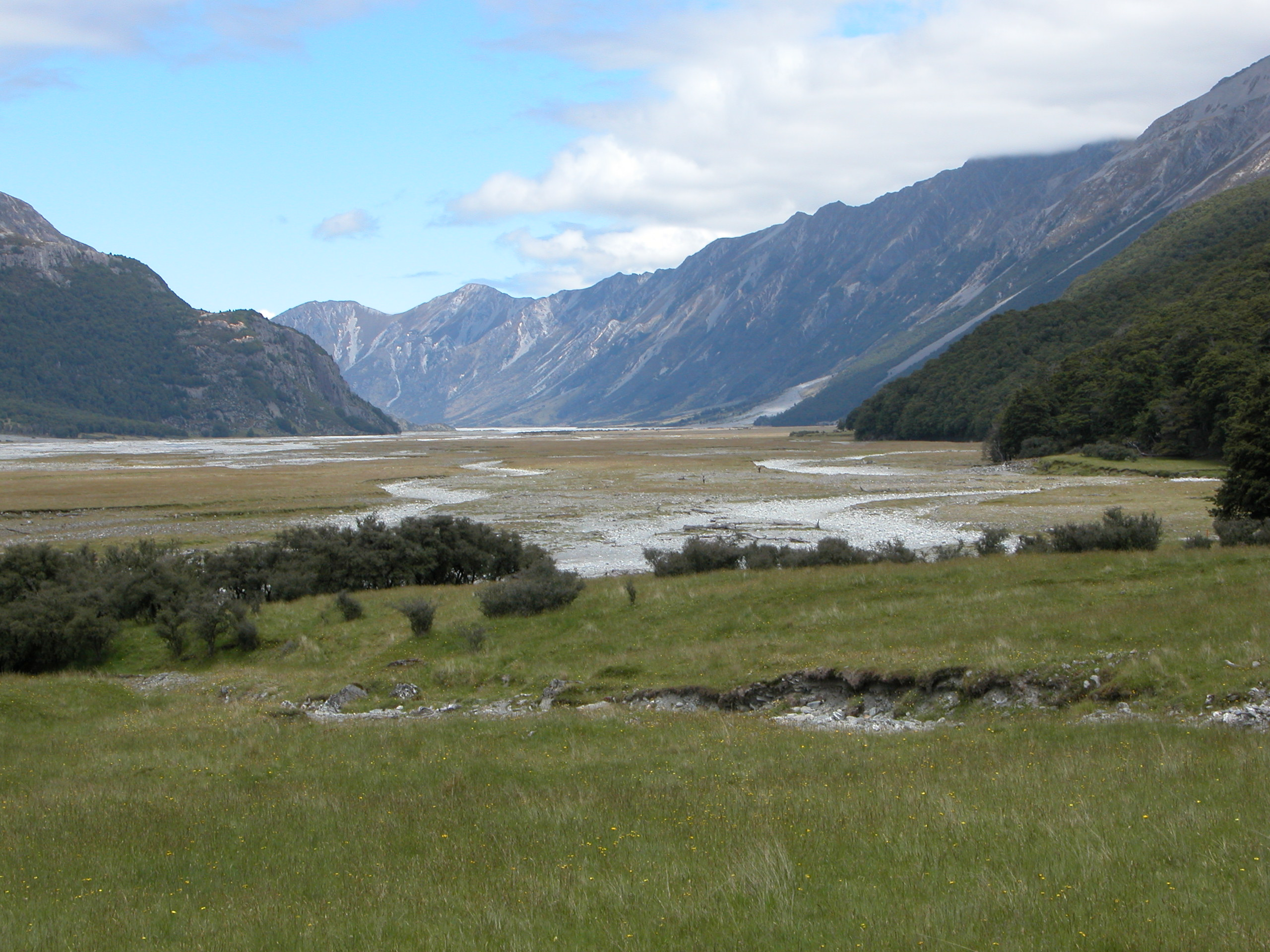
- Hopkins River as viewed from Elcho Hut

- Location of the Hopkins River
- Etymology: Probably named after William Hopkins
- Native name: Te Awa Aruhe (Māori)

Location
- Country: New Zealand
- Region: Canterbury
- Territorial authorities: Waitaki and Mackenzie Districts

Physical characteristics
- Source: Richardson Glacier
  - coordinates: 43.8167°S 169.9343°E
  - elevation: 1,100 metres (3,600 ft)
- Mouth: Lake Ōhau
  - coordinates: 44.1821°S 169.8616°E
  - elevation: 530 metres (1,740 ft)
- Length: 45.5 kilometres (28.3 mi)

Basin features
- Progression: Lake Ōhau→ Ōhau River→ Lake Benmore→ Lake Aviemore→ Lake Waitaki→ Waitaki River→ Pacific Ocean
- Tributaries
  - left: S Bend Creek, Dodger Stream, Dobson River
  - right: Thomson Stream, Elcho Stream, Thar Creek, Paradise Creek, Huxley River, Temple Stream, Maitland Stream

The Hopkins River (Māori: Te Awa Aruhe) is in the central South Island of New Zealand. It flows south for 45 kilometres (28 mi) from the Southern Alps / Kā Tiritiri o te Moana into the northern end of Lake Ōhau in the Mackenzie Country.

Its headwaters, on the southern slopes of Mount Hopkins, form the northernmost point of Otago, and the river's braided valley is part of the border between Otago and Canterbury. The river's main tributary is the Dobson River.
