= Landsborough River =

River in New Zealand

Coordinates: 43°59′S 169°29′E

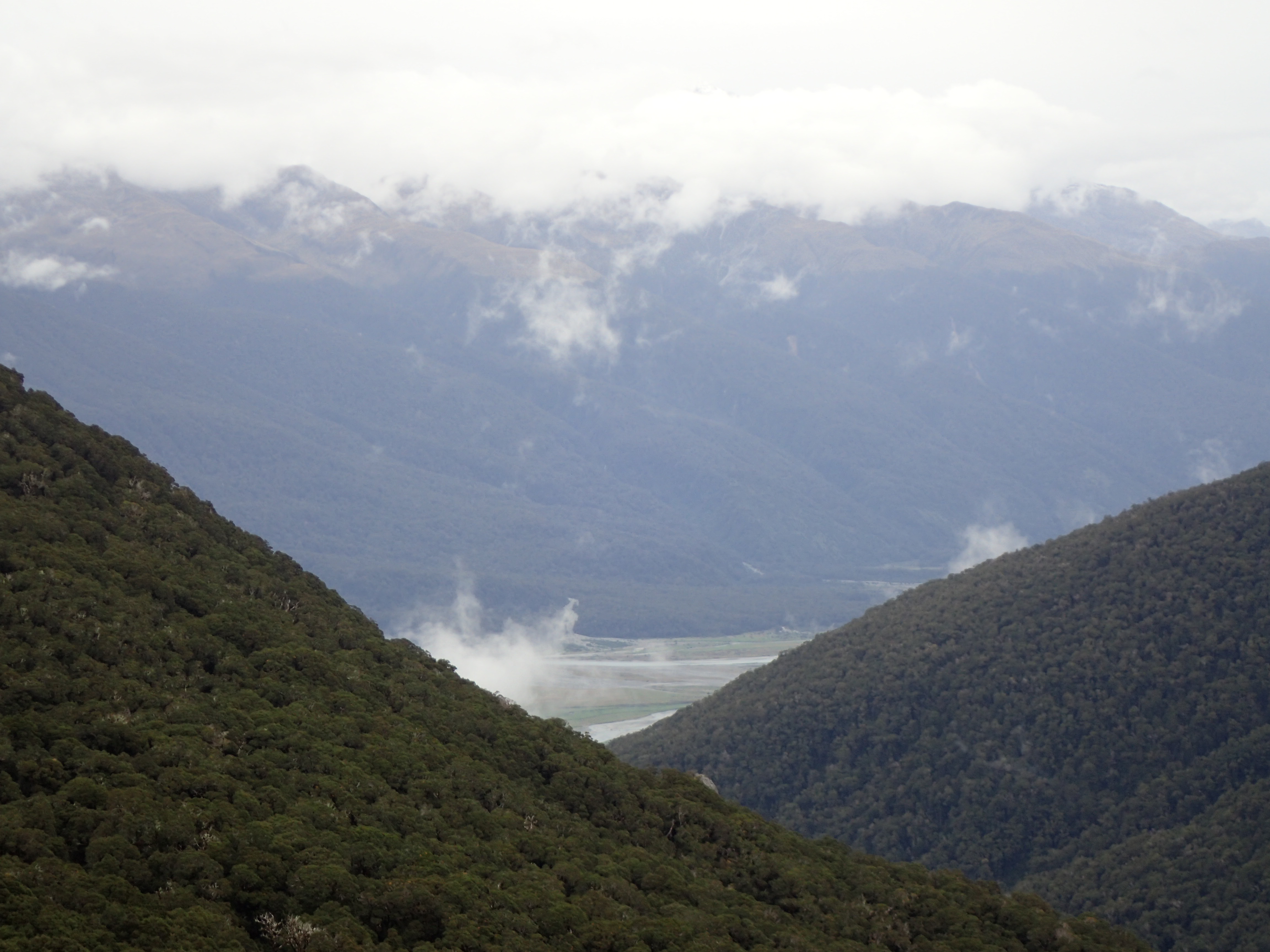
Landsborough River (At back) meets the Clarke River

The Landsborough River is located in New Zealand's South Island. A major tributary of the Haast River, it flows southwest, parallel with the Southern Alps, for 50 kilometres from its source five kilometres north of Mount Hopkins to meet the Haast 12 kilometres below the Haast Pass.

In April 2005 the Nature Heritage Fund purchased private land in the Landsborough River valley to the south as an addition to the Mount Aspiring National Park.
