= Mount Turner (New Zealand) =

Mountain in New Zealand

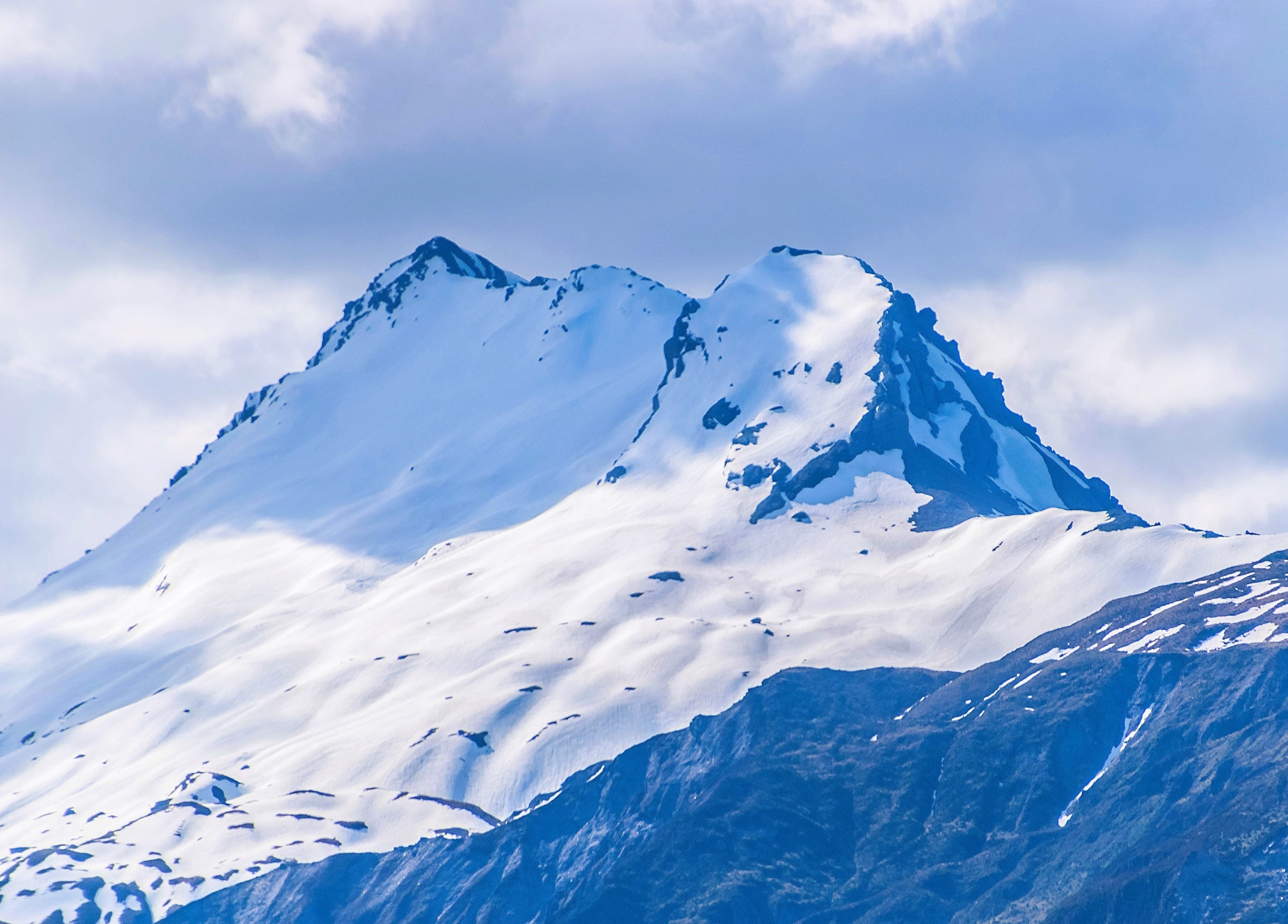
- Southeast aspect

Highest point
- Elevation: 2,150 m (7,054 ft)
- Prominence: 437 m (1,434 ft)
- Isolation: 8.66 km (5.38 mi)
- Coordinates: 44°13′06″S 169°05′10″E

Geography
- Location within New Zealand
- Interactive map of Mount Turner
- Location: South Island
- Country: New Zealand
- Region: Otago
- Protected area: Mount Aspiring National Park
- Parent range: Southern Alps
- Topo map: NZMS260 F38

Climbing
- First ascent: 1953

Mount Turner is a 2,150-metre-elevation (7,054-foot) mountain in the Otago region of New Zealand.

== Description ==
Mount Turner is located 12 kilometres (7.5 mi) northwest of the community of Makarora and is set in Mount Aspiring National Park on South Island. It is part of the West Wanaka Mountains which are part of the Southern Alps. Precipitation runoff from the mountain drains to the Wilkin River and the Makarora River. Topographic relief is significant as the summit rises 1,550 metres (5,085 feet) above Siberia Valley in two kilometres, and 1,850 metres (6,070 feet) above the Wilkin Valley in three kilometres. The nearest higher peak is Mount Awful, eight kilometres to the north. The first ascent of the summit was made in January 1953 by D. Ball, L.W. Bruce, A.R. Craven, and M. McGuire.

== Climate ==
Based on the Köppen climate classification, Mount Turner is located in a marine west coast (Cfb) climate zone with a subpolar oceanic climate (Cfc) at the summit. Prevailing westerly winds blow moist air from the Tasman Sea onto the mountains, where the air is forced upward by the mountains (orographic lift), causing moisture to drop in the form of rain or snow. This climate supports a small unnamed glacier on the south slope. The months of December through February offer the most favourable weather for viewing or climbing this peak.

== See also ==
- List of mountains of New Zealand by height
