= Mount Awful =

Mountain in New Zealand

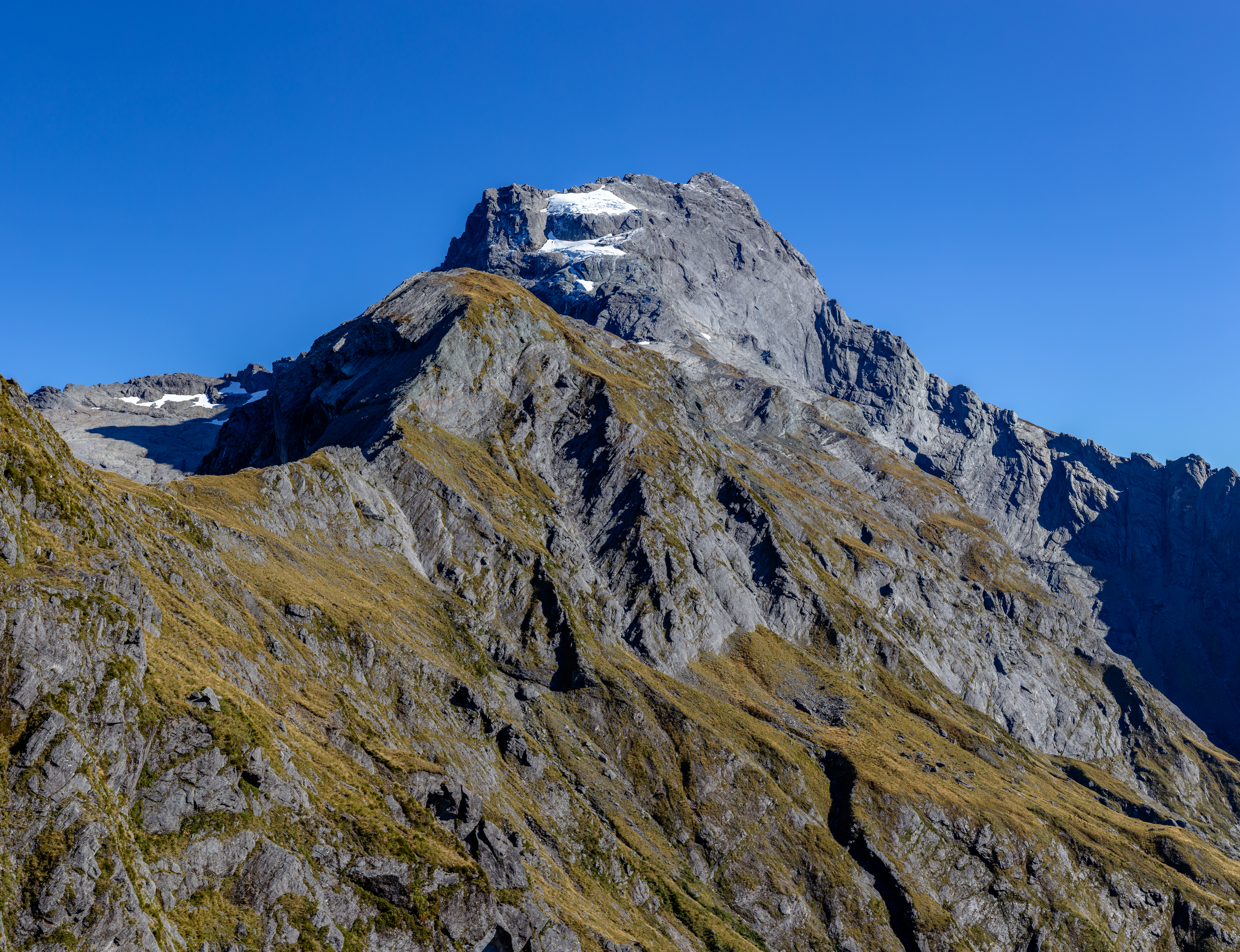
- South aspect

Highest point
- Elevation: 2,192 m (7,192 ft)
- Prominence: 662 m (2,172 ft)
- Isolation: 6.49 km (4.03 mi)
- Listing: Mountains of New Zealand
- Coordinates: 44.141095°S 169.0625°E

Geography
- Location within New Zealand
- Interactive map of Mount Awful
- Location: South Island
- Country: New Zealand
- Region: Otago
- Protected area: Mount Aspiring National Park
- Parent range: Southern Alps
- Topo map(s): NZMS260 F38; Topo50 BZ12

Climbing
- First ascent: 1944

Mount Awful is a 2,192-metre-elevation (7,192-foot) mountain in Otago, New Zealand.

== Description ==
Mount Awful is located 15 kilometres northwest of the community of Makarora in the Southern Alps of the South Island. It is set within Mount Aspiring National Park which is part of the Te Wahipounamu UNESCO World Heritage Site. Precipitation runoff from the mountain's west and south slopes drains to the Wilkin River via Siberia Stream, whereas the north and east slopes drain into the headwaters of the North and South branches of the Young River. Topographic relief is significant as the summit rises 1,400 metres (4,593 feet) above the North Branch in two kilometres. The nearest higher neighbour is Mount Alba, six kilometres to the southwest.

== Climate ==
Based on the Köppen climate classification, Mount Awful is located in a marine west coast climate zone, with a subpolar oceanic climate (Cfc) at the summit. Prevailing westerly winds blow moist air from the Tasman Sea onto the mountain, where the air is forced upwards by the mountains (orographic lift), causing moisture to drop in the form of rain and snow. The months of December through February offer the most favourable weather for viewing or climbing this peak.

== Climbing ==
The first ascent of the summit was made in December 1944 by J.W. Aitken, J. Gillespie, E. Miller, and F. Wilkinson.

Climbing routes:

- North West Ridge – J.W. Aitken, J. Gillespie, E. Miller, F. Wilkinson – (1944)
- Weta Walk (East Face) – Clinton Beavan, Allan Uren – (1996)
- A Stitch in Time (East Face) – Anna Gillooly, David Hiddleston – (2000)
- South West Ridge – Mark Morrison, Regan Low – (2001)
- Wicked (East Face) – Milo Gilmour, Llewellyn Murdock – (2013)
- Summer of Yes (East Face) – Milo Gilmour, Nick Flyvbjerg, Rich Tribe – (2013)
- A Very Hungry Weka (East Face) – Timothy Hargrave, Alan Goldbetter – (2014)
- South East Ridge – FA unknown

== See also ==
- List of mountains of New Zealand by height
