= Mount Pollux =

Mountain in New Zealand

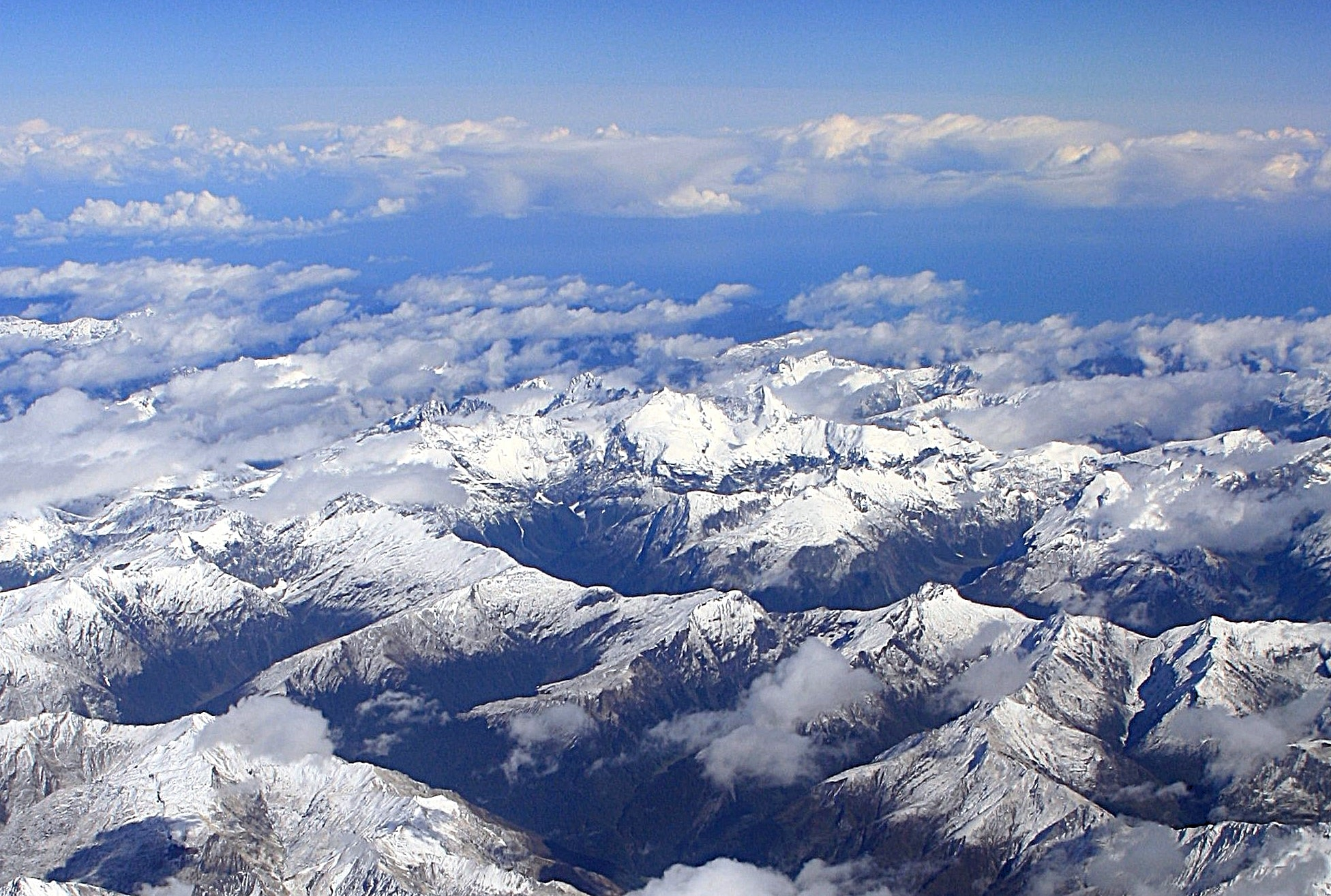
- Southeast aspect, centred in frame

Highest point
- Elevation: 2,536 m (8,320 ft)
- Prominence: 1,127 m (3,698 ft)
- Isolation: 19.93 km (12.38 mi)
- Listing: New Zealand #61
- Coordinates: 44.232386°S 168.873483°E

Naming
- Etymology: Pollux

Geography
- Location within New Zealand
- Interactive map of Mount Pollux
- Location: South Island
- Country: New Zealand
- Region: West Coast / Otago
- Protected area: Mount Aspiring National Park
- Parent range: Southern Alps
- Topo map(s): NZMS260 F38; Topo50 BZ11

Climbing
- First ascent: January 1934

Mount Pollux is a 2,536-metre-elevation (8,320-foot) mountain in New Zealand.

== Description ==
Mount Pollux is located 1.5 kilometre southwest of Mount Castor on the crest or Main Divide of the Southern Alps. The summit is set on the boundary shared by the Otago and West Coast Regions of the South Island. It is also within Mount Aspiring National Park which is part of the Te Wahipounamu UNESCO World Heritage Site. Precipitation runoff from the mountain's slopes drains east to the Wilkin River, northwest to the Drake River, and southwest into the headwaters of the Donald River. Topographic relief is significant as the summit rises 1,708 metres (5,604 feet) above Lucidus Lake in two kilometres. The nearest higher neighbour is Mount Aspiring, 20 kilometres to the southwest. Mount Castor and Mount Pollux were named by Charlie Douglas after the twin peaks in the Swiss Alps, which in turn were named after Castor and Pollux of Greek mythology.

== Climate ==
Based on the Köppen climate classification, Mount Pollux is located in a marine west coast climate zone, with a subpolar oceanic climate (Cfc) at the summit. Prevailing westerly winds blow moist air from the Tasman Sea onto the mountain, where the air is forced upwards by the mountains (orographic lift), causing moisture to drop in the form of rain and snow. This climate supports the Pickelhaube and Donald glaciers on the mountain's slopes. The months of December through February offer the most favourable weather for viewing or climbing this peak.

== Climbing ==
Climbing routes with first ascents:

- Chasm Pass Route – E. Miller, J.S. Shanks, G.B. Thomas, A.J. Scott, W. Young, J. Dumbleton – (1934)
- Bluffs Route – C.C. Benzoni, R.R. Edwards, G.L. Edwards, L.W. Divers, D.C. Peters – (1937)
- Diana Buttress – Roger Coombs, Brian Dawkins, Rob Mitchell – (1973)
- Donald Glacier Route – Allan Brent, Nina Dickerhof, James Thornton – (2017)

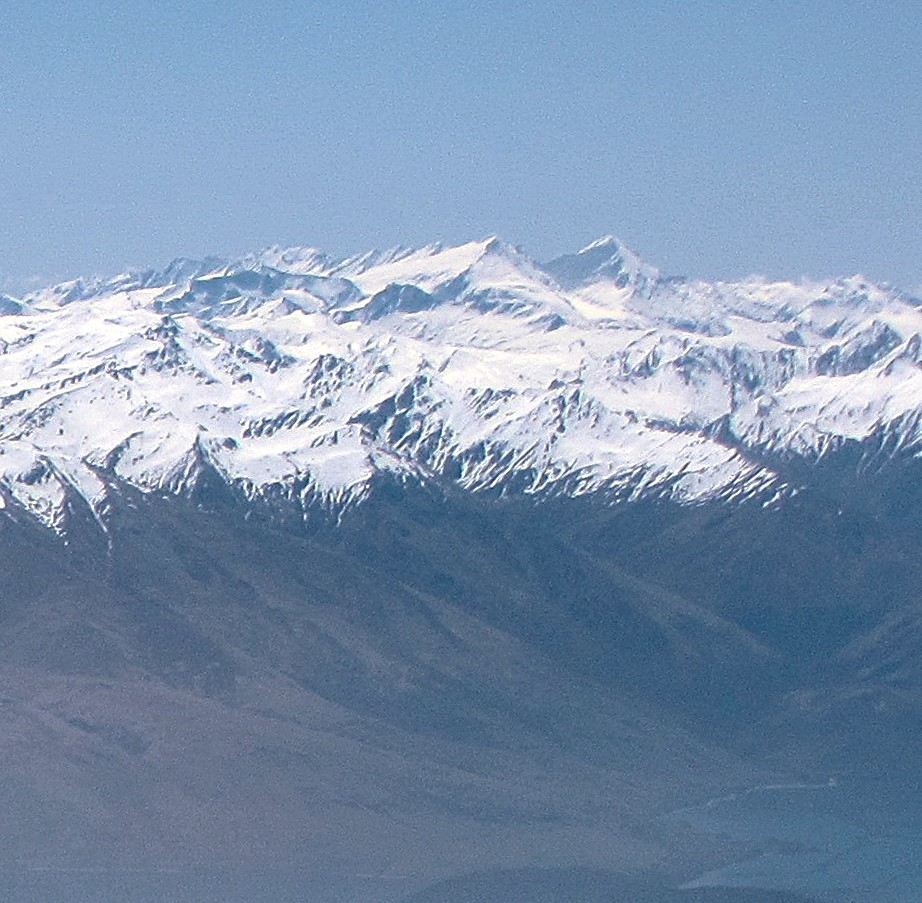
Mount Pollux centred on skyline. Mount Castor to immediate right

== See also ==
- List of mountains of New Zealand by height
