= Mount Castor =

Mountain in New Zealand

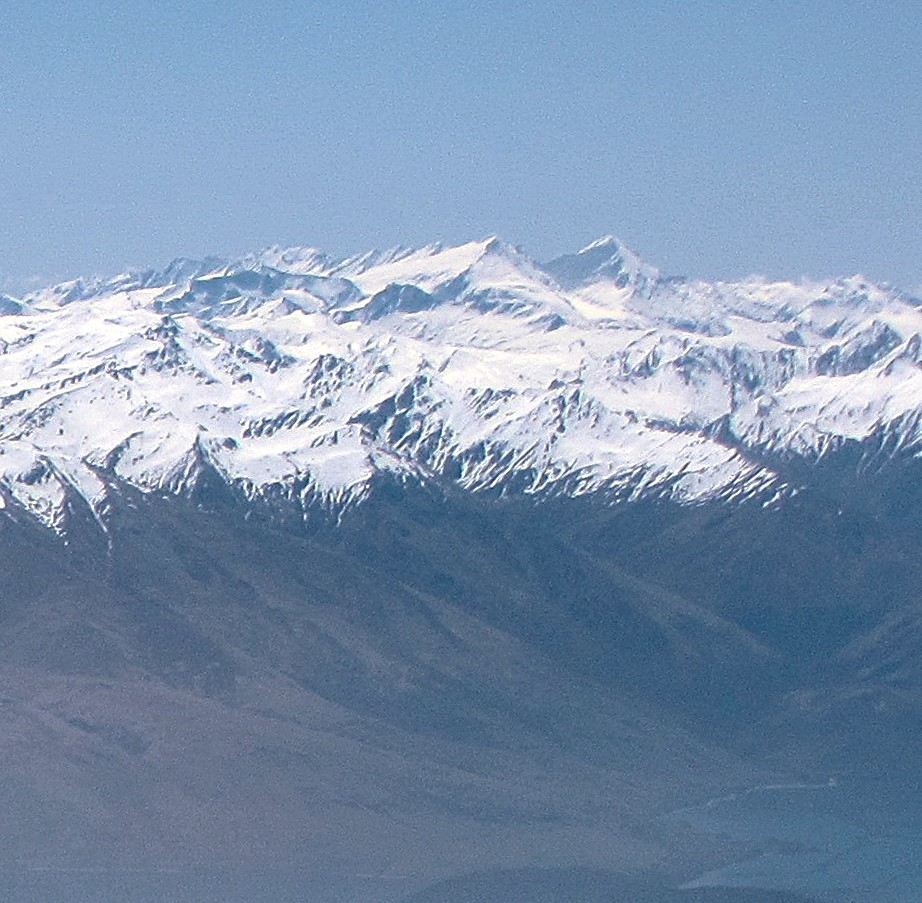
- Mount Pollux centred on skyline with Mount Castor to immediate right

Highest point
- Elevation: 2,518 m (8,261 ft)
- Prominence: 303 m (994 ft)
- Isolation: 1.5 km (0.93 mi)
- Listing: New Zealand #66
- Coordinates: 44.221107°S 168.883832°E

Naming
- Etymology: Castor
- Native name: Hinemakawe (Māori)

Geography
- Location within New Zealand
- Interactive map of Mount Castor
- Location: South Island
- Country: New Zealand
- Region: West Coast / Otago
- Protected area: Mount Aspiring National Park
- Parent range: Southern Alps
- Topo map(s): NZMS260 F38; Topo50 BZ11

Climbing
- First ascent: March 1937

Mount Castor is a 2,518-metre-elevation (8,261-foot) mountain in New Zealand.

== Description ==
Mount Castor is located 1.5 kilometre northeast of Mount Pollux on the crest or Main Divide of the Southern Alps. The summit is set on the boundary shared by the Otago and West Coast Regions of the South Island. It is also within Mount Aspiring National Park which is part of the Te Wahipounamu UNESCO World Heritage Site. Precipitation runoff from the mountain's slopes drains southeast to the North Branch Wilkin River and northwest to the Drake River. Topographic relief is significant as the summit rises 1,690 metres (5,545 feet) above Lucidus Lake in less than two kilometres. The nearest higher neighbour is Mount Pollux, 1.5 kilometre to the southwest. Mount Castor and Mount Pollux were named by Charlie Douglas after the twin peaks in the Swiss Alps, which in turn were named after Castor and Pollux of Greek mythology.

== Climate ==
Based on the Köppen climate classification, Mount Castor is located in a marine west coast climate zone, with a subpolar oceanic climate (Cfc) at the summit. Prevailing westerly winds blow moist air from the Tasman Sea onto the mountain, where the air is forced upwards by the mountains (orographic lift), causing moisture to drop in the form of rain and snow. This climate supports the Pickelhaube and unnamed glaciers on the mountain's slopes. The months of December through February offer the most favourable weather for viewing or climbing this peak.

== Climbing ==
Climbing routes with first ascents:

- Pickelhaube Glacier via Chasm Pass – C.C. Benzoni, R.R. Edwards, G.L. Edwards, L.W. Divers, D.C. Peters – (1937)
- East Ridge – Ian Baine, Graham McCallum – (1963)
- South East Face – Margaret Fyfe, Graham McCallum – (1975)
- Pickelhaube Glacier via Drake River – Matt Warwick, Geoff Spearpoint – (1979)

== See also ==
- List of mountains of New Zealand by height
