= Kahukura =

The Māori name Kahukura (red cloak) may refer to:

- Kahukura (mythology), a figure from Māori mythology
- Kahukura, the Māori name for Mount Alba in New Zealand
- Kahukura (sport), a group of affiliated sports clubs from Rotorua
- Kahukura Bentson (born 1978), New Zealand boxer
- Kahukura Marine Reserve, a Fiordland's marine reserve in the Gold Arm of Charles Sound, South Island, New Zealand
- New Zealand red admiral, butterfly (known as kahukura in Māori)
