= Mount Turner =

Mount Turner may refer to:

- Mount Turner (Alberta) in Banff National Park, Alberta, Canada
- Mount Turner (Fairweather Range) on the Canada - United States border
- Mount Turner (New Zealand) in Southern Alps
- Mount Turner (Yukon) in Yukon, Canada
