= Mount Alba =

Mountain in New Zealand

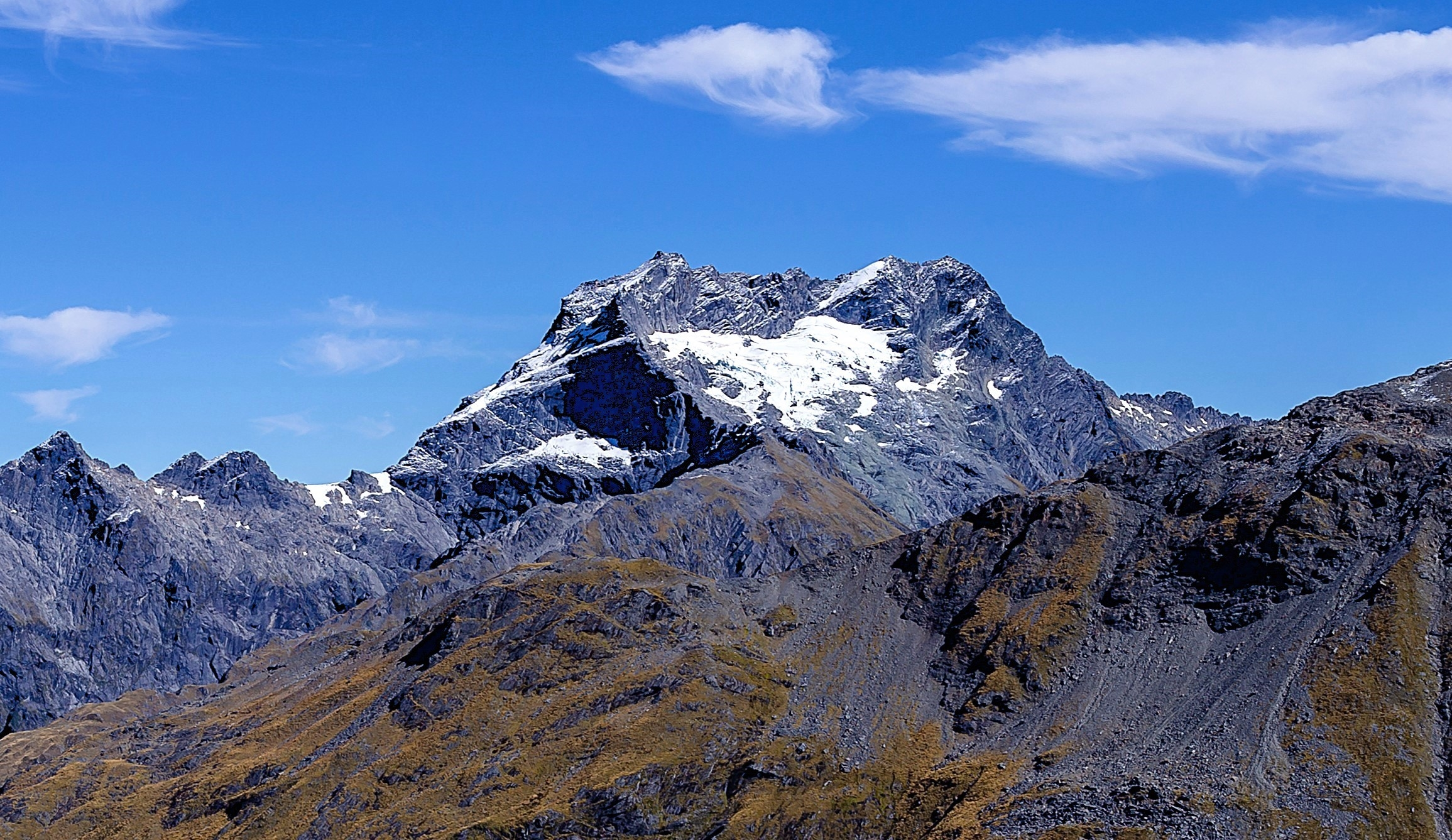
- East aspect

Highest point
- Elevation: 2,360 m (7,743 ft)
- Prominence: 784 m (2,572 ft)
- Isolation: 10.2 km (6.3 mi)
- Coordinates: 44°10′05″S 168°59′17″E

Naming
- Native name: Kahukura (Māori)

Geography
- Location within New Zealand
- Interactive map of Mount Alba
- Location: South Island
- Country: New Zealand
- Region: West Coast / Otago
- Protected area: Mount Aspiring National Park
- Parent range: Southern Alps
- Topo map: NZTopo50 BZ12

Climbing
- First ascent: 1939

Mount Alba is a 2,360-metre-elevation (7,743-foot) mountain in New Zealand.

== Description ==
Mount Alba is set on the crest or Main Divide of the Southern Alps and is situated on the common boundary shared by Otago and West Coast Regions of South Island. This remote peak is located 330 kilometres (205 mi) west-southwest of the city of Christchurch and is set in Mount Aspiring National Park. Precipitation runoff from the mountain drains east to the Wilkin River via Siberia and Newland streams, whereas the west slope drains into the Te Naihi River. Topographic relief is significant as the summit rises nearly 1,200 metres (3,937 feet) above Crucible Lake in one kilometre, and over 1,700 metres (5,577 feet) above the Siberia Valley in three kilometres. The nearest higher peak is Mount Castor, 10 km to the southwest.

== Etymology ==
The origin of the mountain's name is not documented, but it is recorded as a Latin word which can mean white. Mount Alba could thus be construed as "Mount White" which would be analogous to Mont Blanc of the French Alps. The Māori name for this mountain is "Kahukura" which means multicoloured or rainbow, and in mythology Kāhukura is the atua of rainbows.

== Climbing ==
Climbing routes on Mount Alba:

- South West Face – First ascent 1939 by J.D. Knowles, A & G Edwards, L & A Divers
- North Face – H.P. Barcham, A.W. Bowden, D.E. Boyd, R.J. Cunninghame – (1961)
- South East Face – Phil Penney, Allan Uren – (1993)
- East Ridge – FA unknown

== Climate ==
Based on the Köppen climate classification, Mount Alba is located in a marine west coast (Cfb) climate zone, with a subpolar oceanic climate (Cfc) at the summit. Prevailing westerly winds blow moist air from the Tasman Sea onto the mountains, where the air is forced upward by the mountains (orographic lift), causing moisture to drop in the form of rain or snow. This climate supports the Axius Glacier on this mountain's west slope and small unnamed glaciers on the other surrounding slopes. The months of December through February offer the most favourable weather for viewing or climbing this peak.

== See also ==
- List of mountains of New Zealand by height
