= Yong River =

Yong River may refer to:

- Yong River (Zhejiang) in Zhejiang, China
- Yong River (Guangxi) in Guangxi, China
- Nyong River, also known as Yong River, in Cameroon

== See also ==
- Yon River in France
- Young River (disambiguation)
