= Young River (New Zealand) =

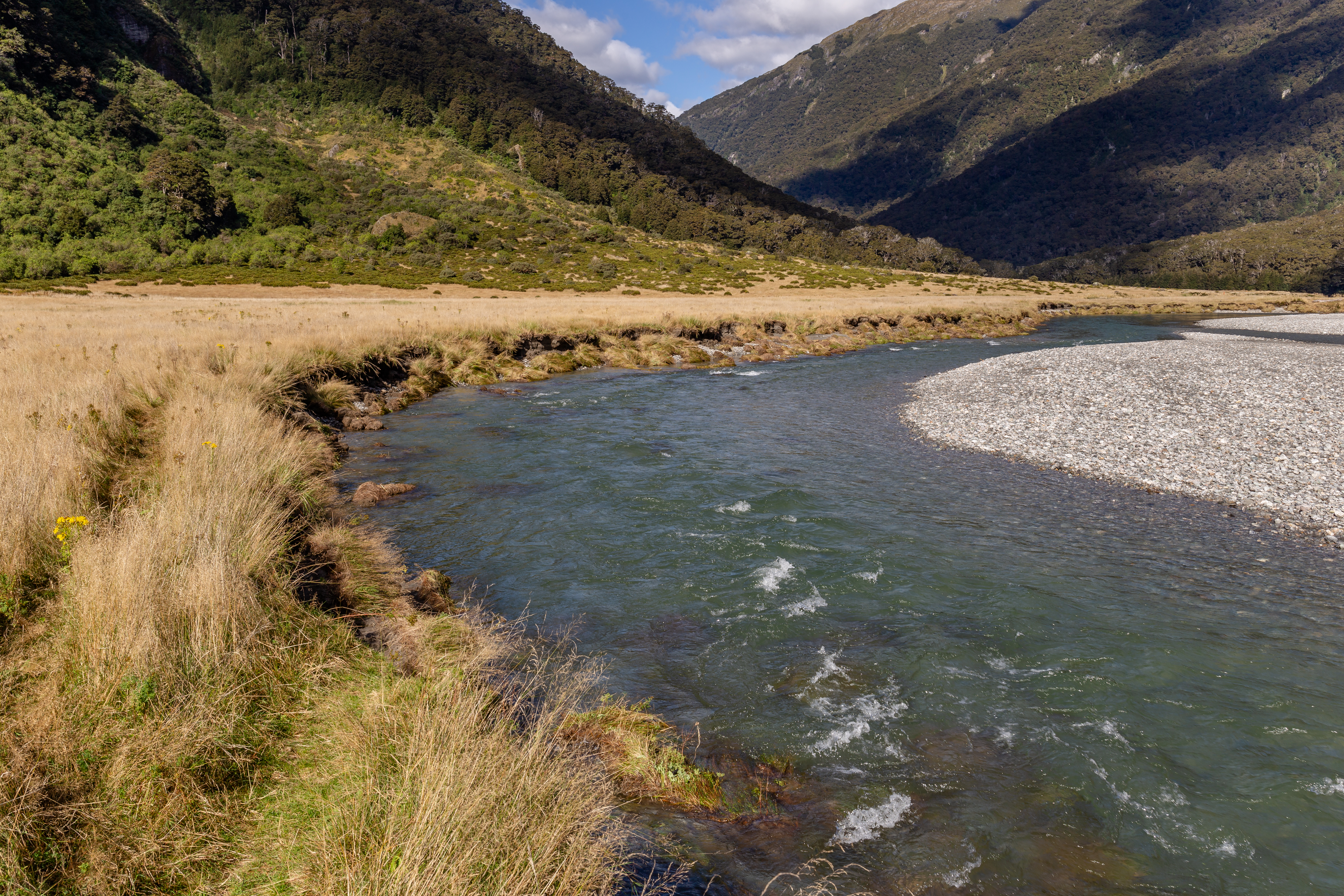
- Route of the Young River
- Mouth of the Young River Young River (New Zealand) (New Zealand)
- Native name: Te Awamakarara (Māori)

Location
- Country: New Zealand
- Region: Otago
- District: Queenstown-Lakes

Physical characteristics
- Source: Young River North Branch
  - location: Mount Doris
  - coordinates: 44.11911°S 169.04322°E
- 2nd source: Young River South Branch
  - location: Mount Awful
  - coordinates: 44.1404°S 169.0674°E
- Mouth
  - location: Makarora River
  - coordinates: 44°12′00″S 169°13′59″E
  - elevation: 305 metres (1,000 ft)
- Length: 21 kilometres (13 mi)

Basin features
- Progression: Young River → Makarora River → Lake Wānaka → Clutha River / Mata-Au → Pacific Ocean
- Tributaries
  - left: Waterfall Creek (North Branch), Stag Creek (North Branch)

Young River (Māori: Te Awamakarara) is in the Otago region of the South Island of New Zealand. It lies within the Mount Aspiring National Park and feeds into the Makarora River 3 kilometres (2 mi) upriver from Makarora.

== Course ==
The ultimate source of the Young River is at the head of Young River North Branch on the eastern slopes of Mount Doris on the main divide of the Southern Alps / Kā Tiritiri o te Moana. The river flow eastwards from it source. There is a landslide dam and 2.5 kilometres (2 mi) long lake 9 kilometres (6 mi) downstream, that formed in 2007. At the lake the river bends to the right and flows southwards for 6 kilometres (4 mi). The Gillespie Pass Circuit tramping track crosses the river using the Young Fork Bridge.

At Young Fork approximately 14 kilometres (9 mi) downstream from the source of the north branch the Young River South Branch merges from the right. The river continues in flowing eastwards for 7 kilometres (4 mi) until it ultimately merges with the Makarora River 3.5 kilometres (2 mi) north of the village of Makarora

== 2007 landslide ==
At 4:40 a.m. on August 29, 2007, a debris avalanche occurred blocking the Young River North Branch. Approximately 11 million cubic metres (390×10^{6} cu ft) of material fell in to the river valley from above forming a 70-metre (230 ft) high landslide dam. A new lake began forming behind the dam. The lake eventually overtopped the dam on 5 October 2007. When fill, the lake is 2,500 metres (8,200 ft) long and 500 metres (1,600 ft) wide and has a volume of 23 million cubic metres (812×10^{6} cu ft).

== See also ==
- List of rivers of New Zealand
