= Donald River (West Coast) =

River in West Coast Region, New Zealand

- Route of the Donald River
- Mouth of the Donald River Donald River (West Coast) (South Island)

Location
- Country: New Zealand
- region: West Coast Region
- District: Westland District

Physical characteristics
- Source: Donald Glacier
  - location: Southern Alps / Kā Tiritiri o te Moana
  - coordinates: 44.2343°S 168.84°E
  - elevation: 1,540 m (5,050 ft)
- Mouth: Waiatoto River
  - coordinates: 44.2308°S 168.78369°E
  - elevation: 120 m (390 ft)
- Length: 6 km (3.7 mi)

Basin features
- Progression: Donald River → Waiatoto River → Jackson Bay / Okahu

The Donald River is a short tributary of the Waiatoto River within Mount Aspiring National Park. It flows west for 6 kilometres (4 mi) from the Donald Glacier on the western slopes of Mount Pollux.
