= Blue River (New Zealand) =

River in the South Island of New Zealand

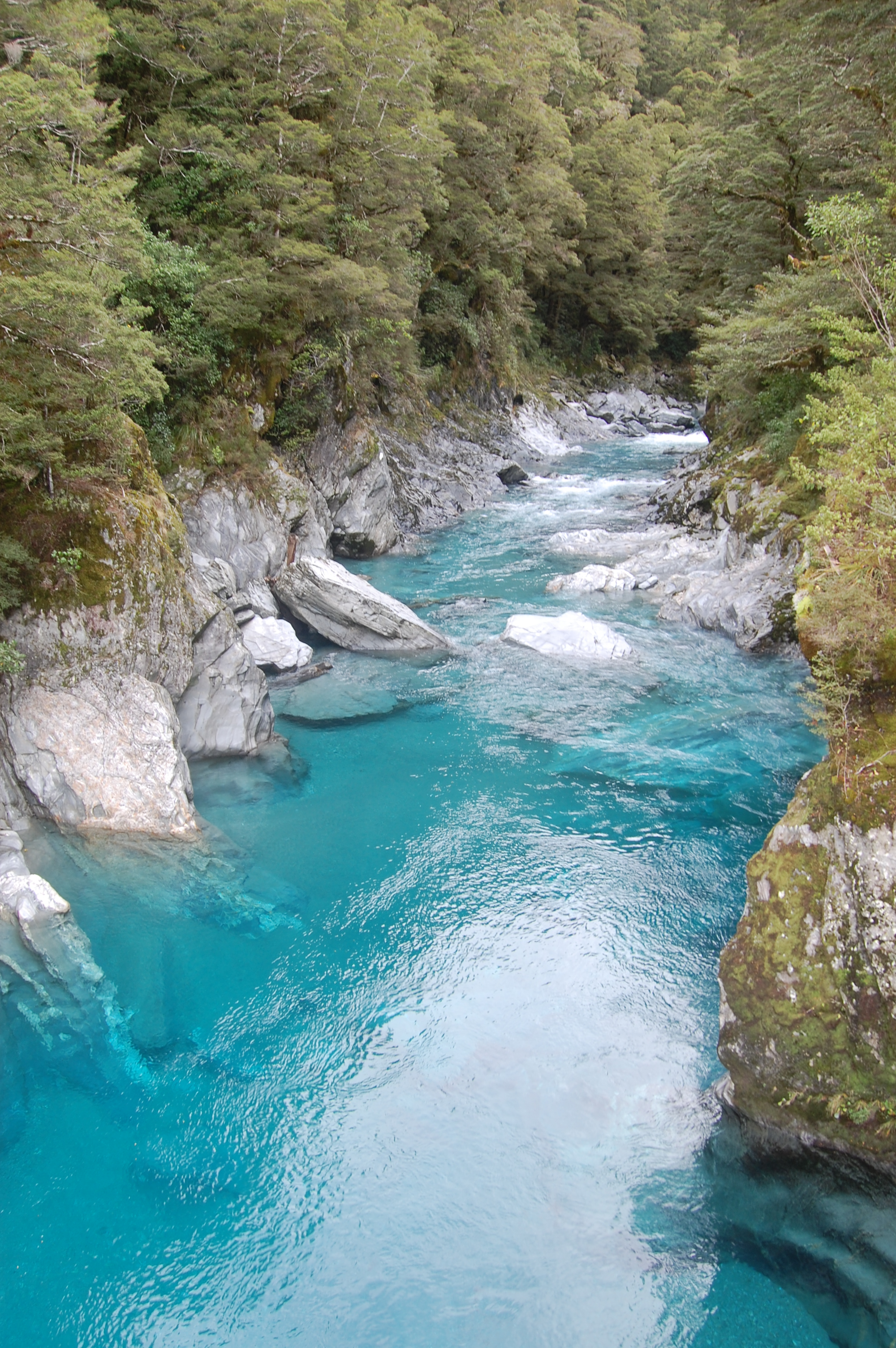
- Blue River gorge at Blue Pools
- Route of the Blue River
- Location of the Blue RIver

Location
- Country: New Zealand

Physical characteristics
- Source: Eyetooth
  - location: Southern Alps
  - coordinates: 44.08581°S 169.13259°E
  - elevation: 1,600 metres (5,200 ft)
- Mouth: Makarora River
  - coordinates: 44.163105°S 169.270692°E
  - elevation: 320 metres (1,050 ft)
- Length: 18 km (11 mi)

Basin features
- Tributaries
  - left: Blue River North Branch
  - right: Blue River South Branch

The Blue River is a small river in the South Island of New Zealand. It flows its entire length within the Mount Aspiring National Park, and although on the southeastern side of the main divide, the river is within the boundaries of the West Coast region for its entire length.

The headwaters are southeast of the main range of the Southern Alps near the mountain Eyetooth, with the smaller Blue River North Branch and South Branch joining the main Blue River later. Shortly before flowing into the Makarora River, the river passes through a narrow gorge.

At its confluence with the Makarora River, the aptly named Blue Pools are the destination of a popular short walk from State Highway 6, with a bridge crossing the Blue River and providing good views upstream into the gorge and downstream over the river flowing into Makarora River. The longer Blue Valley tramping track leads deep into the Blue River Valley and along most of the length of the river.
