= Bettne River =

River in New Zealand

- Route of the Bettne River
- Mouth of the Bettne River Bettne River (South Island)

Location
- Country: New Zealand
- region: West Coast Region
- District: Westland District

Physical characteristics
- Source: Purity Glacier
  - location: Southern Alps / Kā Tiritiri o te Moana
  - coordinates: 44°19′49″S 168°49′20″E
  - elevation: 1,800 m (5,900 ft)
- Mouth: Jackson Bay / Okahu
  - coordinates: 44°18′5″S 168°46′55″E
  - elevation: 300 m (980 ft)
- Length: 5.7 kilometres (3.5 mi)

Basin features
- Progression: Purity Glacier → Bettne River → Waiatoto River → Jackson Bay / Okahu
- River system: Waiatoto River
- Tributaries
  - left: Finis Creek

The Bettne River is a river of South Westland, New Zealand. A tributary of the Waiatoto River, it rises in the Southern Alps / Kā Tiritiri o te Moana and flows north-westward to join that river 4 kilometres (2.5 mi) south of the Bonar Flats.

== See also ==
- List of rivers of New Zealand
