= Bonar River =

- Route of the Bonar River
- Mouth of the Bonar River Bonar River (New Zealand)

Location
- Country: New Zealand
- Region: West Coast Region
- District: Westland

Physical characteristics
- Source: Bell Glacier
  - coordinates: 44.2711°S 168.8502°E
- Mouth
  - location: Waiatoto River
  - coordinates: 44°15′56″S 168°47′35″E
- Length: 5 km (3 mi)

Basin features
- Progression: Bonar River → Waiatoto River → Jackson Bay / Okahu → Tasman Sea
- Tributaries
  - right: Stormwater Stream

The Bonar River is a short river of New Zealand. It is in Mount Aspiring National Park and flows west for 5 kilometres (3 mi) before joining the Waiatoto River. Its source is on the slopes of Mount Taurus, 15 kilometres (9 mi) northeast of Mount Aspiring / Tititea.

== See also ==
- List of rivers of New Zealand
