= Mount Brewster (New Zealand) =

Mountain in the Southern Alps, New Zealand

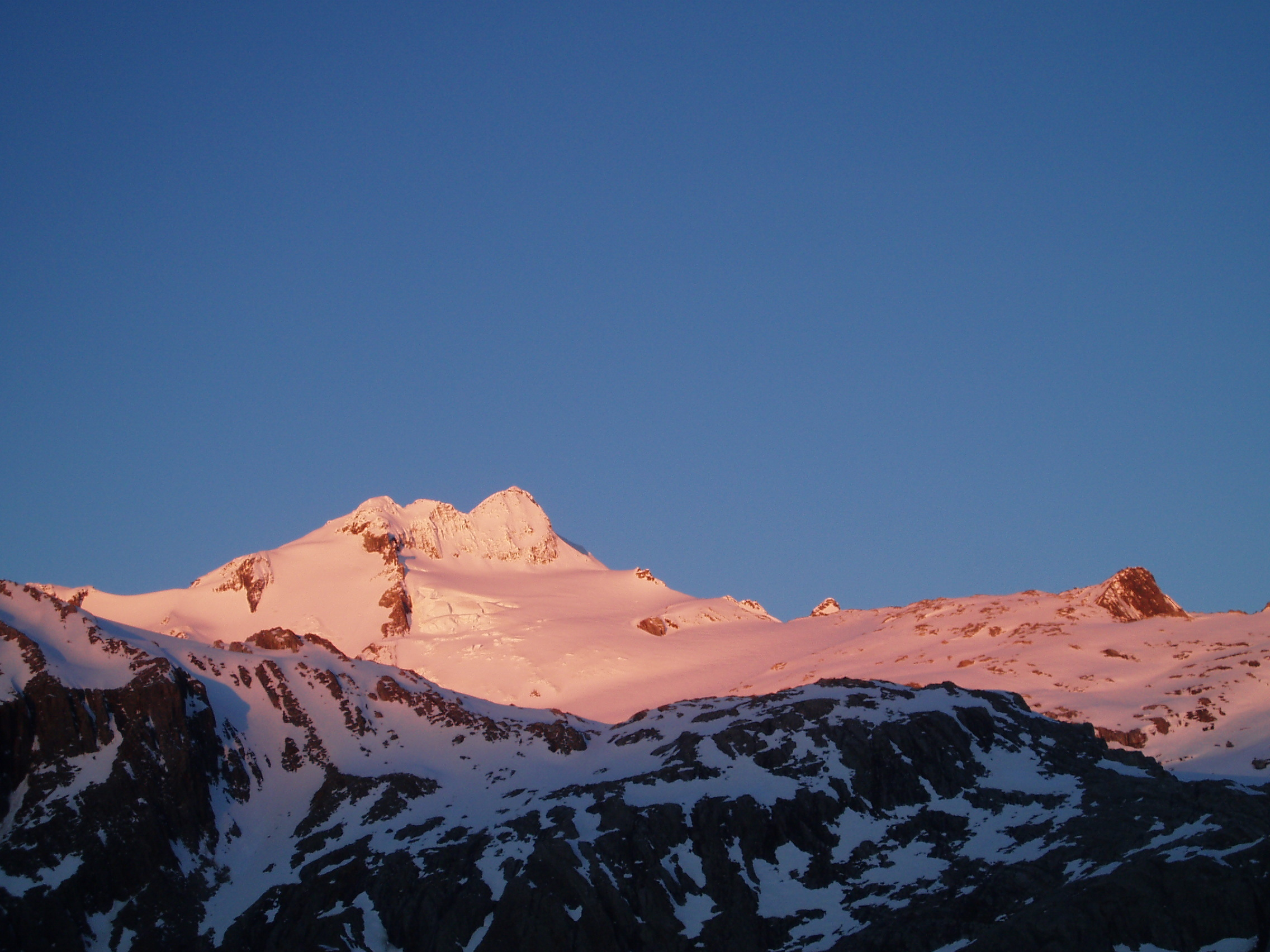

Highest point
- Elevation: 2,516 m (8,255 ft)
- Prominence: 938 m (3,077 ft)
- Coordinates: 44.066°S 169.45°E

Naming
- Native name: Haumaitiketike

Geography
- Location: Mount Aspiring National Park, South Island, New Zealand
- Parent range: Southern Alps

Mount Brewster (known in Māori as Haumaitiketike) is a mountain in the Southern Alps of New Zealand, in eastern Mount Aspiring National Park.

== Geography ==
Mount Brewster is a part of the Southern Alps, and lies at the end of the Young Range. Water from the vicinity of the mountain primarily drains into Lake Wānaka and Lake Hāwea, via the Brewster Glacier and Makarora River. The mountain is 2,516 m (8,255 ft) high; the tallest mountain within a 20 km (12 mi) radius.

== Geology ==
Mount Brewster is formed from sedimentary rock layers, primarily sandstone, siltstone and mudstone. The rock dates from the Middle Permian and Triassic periods, and was formed approximately 201–273 million years ago.

== History ==
Julius von Haast named the peak after Scottish physicist David Brewster. The first ascent of Mount Brewster was made in January 1929 by Samuel Turner, Eric Miller, Charles Bentham and C. Turner.
