= Young River =

Young River may refer to:

- Young River (New Zealand)
- Young River (Western Australia)
