= Pearson River =

- Route of the Ngatau River
- Mouth of the Ngatau River Pearson River (New Zealand)

Location
- Country: New Zealand
- Region: West Coast
- District: Westland

Physical characteristics
- Source: Pearson Saddle
  - coordinates: 44.3062°S 168.8401°E
- Mouth
  - location: Waiatoto River
  - coordinates: 44°17′46″S 168°47′18″E
- Length: 5 km (3 mi)

Basin features
- Progression: Pearson River → Waiatoto River → Jackson Bay / Okahu → Tasman Sea
- Tributaries
  - left: Jimmy Creek

The Pearson River is a river of the West Coast region of New Zealand's South Island. It flows west from Pearson Saddle immediately to the south of Mount Taurus, before joining the Waiatoto River after a distance of roughly 4.5 kilometres (2.8 mi).

== See also ==
- List of rivers of New Zealand
