= Jetsprint =

Form of motorboat racing

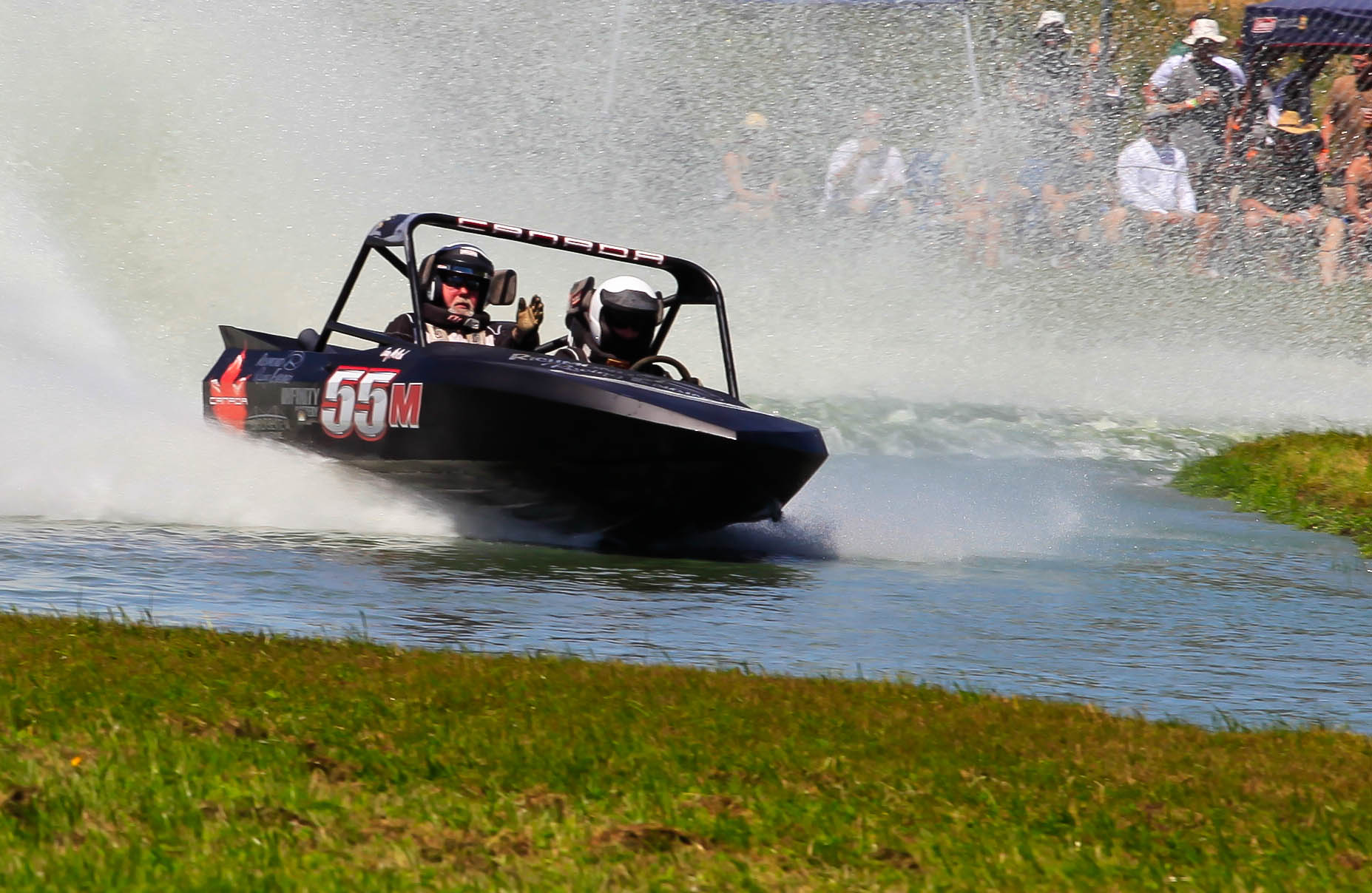
A sprint boat racing in Oregon in 2013

Jetsprint or sprint boat racing is a form of motorboat racing in which jetboats, with a crew of two, race individually against the clock through a twisting series of channels in less than a metre of water.

Tracks are typically designed for spectators, and racing is fast and loud, with boat motors usually powered by V8s developing well over 500 hp.

== History ==
Jetsprinting as an organised sport originated in New Zealand in 1981 by Pat Quinn and his wife, Margaret. Margaret spectated jet boat Marathons which Pat competed in, but wanted to see more of the race, suggesting a smaller, more condensed track. Events were originally held in the same natural braided rivers that had inspired Sir William Hamilton to develop the jetboat, but when the sport was introduced to Australia in the mid-1980s, permanent artificial courses were used—and this is now the norm even in New Zealand.

There is now a world championship under the auspices of the Union Internationale Motonautique, with hosting rotating between New Zealand, Australia and the U.S.A.

== Format ==
The race itself consists of a predefined course through the channels with 25 to 30 changes of direction. These races generally take just 45–60 seconds. Once qualifying is completed, the competitors each run the course with the fastest qualifiers running last. The fastest 16 (typically depending on the number of competitions) proceed to the next round. This is then reduced to the top 12, Top 8 then the top 5 and finally the fastest three.

=== Boats ===
A jetsprint hull is typically short - just 3.8 to 4.0 metres (12½ to 13 feet) long. The hull's vee is usually 23 to 25 degrees with several strakes on each side. A short hull is preferred, as a longer hull takes more distance to turn and usually must be turned at a slower speed. The strakes provide "traction' by stopping the boat from sliding sideways across the water when turning at high speed.

A rollcage must be fitted to the boat.

=== Crew ===
A crew consists of the driver and a navigator, whose responsibility is to guide the driver through the course - typically via simple hand signals, pointing the hand in the direction that the boat must go at the next intersection.

== Classes ==
There are two internationally recognised classes

Group A - engines in Group A boats are restricted to either 6.7-litre (412 cubic inch) engines with cast iron blocks and heads, or 6-litre (365 cubic inch) engines with aluminium heads. Both engines are only allowed two push-rod operated valves per cylinder. Furthermore, the engine must be naturally aspirated, using a four-barrel carburetor. Fuel is 100+ octane aviation fuel. Typically these engines produce up to 650 horsepower

Super Boats - engines in the Super Boat class have no maximum size, but instead have a minimum size restriction. Naturally aspirated engines must have a displacement of 6.5 litres (400 cubic inches), while forced induction (turbocharged or supercharged) engines must be at least 3.8 liters (235 cubic inches) in displacement. These engines typically are fuel injected and run methanol fuel. The small-block engines typically produce 950+ horsepower, while the big blocks can produce between 1000 and 1600 horsepower.

Nitromethane and nitrous oxide are not allowed.

== See also ==
- Jetboat
- River marathon
- Offshore powerboat racing
