= Fish River (New Zealand) =

- Route of the Fish River
- Mouth of the Fish River Fish River (New Zealand) (New Zealand)

Location
- Country: New Zealand
- Region: Otago
- District: Queenstown-Lakes

Physical characteristics
- Source: Southern Alps
  - coordinates: 44.0681°S 169.2991°E
- Mouth
  - location: Makarora River
  - coordinates: 44°07′36″S 169°20′23″E

Basin features
- Progression: Fish River → Makarora River → Lake Wānaka → Clutha River / Mata-Au → Pacific Ocean
- Tributaries
  - left: Brodrick Stream
  - right: Jubilee Creek

The Fish River, is a river in the Otago Region of New Zealand. A tributary of the Makarora River, it rises east of Mount Burke and flows south-eastward through Mount Aspiring National Park, crossing State Highway 6 at 44° 6.97'S 169° 20.66'E, to join that river south of Haast Pass.

The river was named by Julius von Haast in 1863 Charles Cameron travelled up the Fish River a few weeks earlier.

== See also ==
- List of rivers of New Zealand
