= Makarora River =

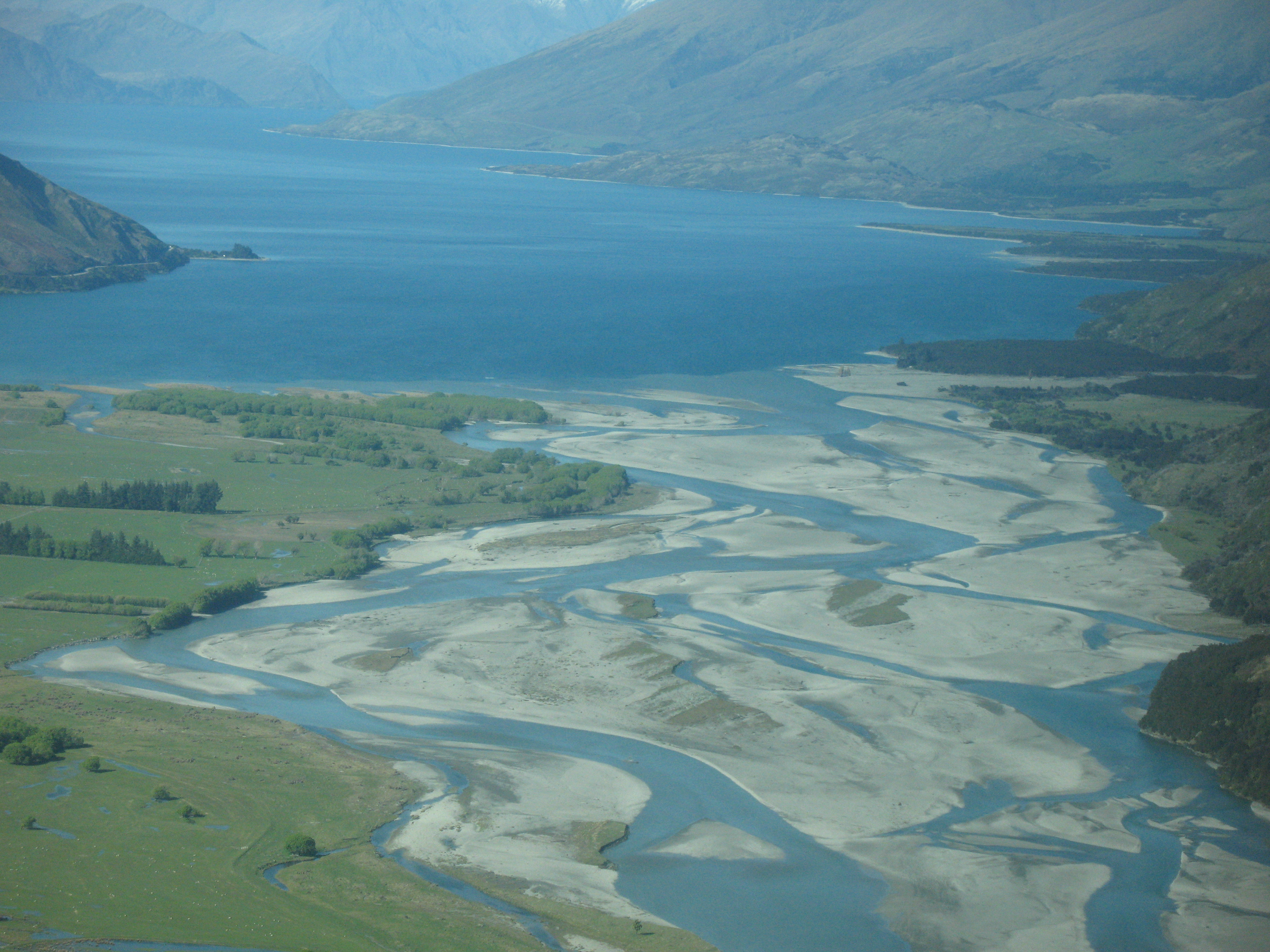
- The Makarora River flows into northern end of Lake Wānaka.
- Route of the Makarora River
- Mouth of the Makarora River Makarora River (New Zealand)
- Native name: Makarore (Māori)

Location
- Country: New Zealand
- Region: Otago
- District: Queenstown-Lakes

Physical characteristics
- Source: Mount Brewster
  - coordinates: 44.08138°S 169.45956°E
- Mouth
  - location: Lake Wānaka
  - coordinates: 44°19′04″S 169°10′17″E
  - elevation: 300 m (980 ft)
- Length: 35 km (22 mi)

Basin features
- Progression: Makarora River → Lake Wānaka → Clutha River / Mata-Au → Pacific Ocean
- Tributaries
  - left: Stewart Creek, Kiwi Creek, Camerons Creek, Muddy Creek, Templeton Creek, Brady Creek, Sawmill Creek, Pipson Creek, White Creek, Station Creek, Ewings Creek, Boggy Creek, Flaxmill Creek, Ōturaki Creek
  - right: Fish River, Blue River, Ore Stream, Leven Stream, Young River, Tiel Creek, Wilkin River

The Makarora River is in the Otago region of the South Island of New Zealand.

== Name ==
The Kāi Tahu name for the river is Makarore. Manga (maka in the Kāi Tahu dialect) means stream. However the meaning of rore in this context is unknown.

== Geography ==
The headwaters are in Mount Aspiring National Park, on the eastern flanks of the Southern Alps near Haast Pass, which is the saddle between the Makarora and Haast River valleys. The Makarora River flows south into the northern end of Lake Wānaka after passing the small community of Makarora. The river attracts some recreational fishing, jetboating and kayaking. Rainbow and brown trout migrate from Lake Wānaka up the river and its tributaries to spawn, mainly in autumn and winter.

== Landslide ==
In September 2007 a landslide in the Young River valley blocked off the corresponding stream. Young River is a tributary to Makarora River. The landslide created a new lake which appears to be permanent.

== Tourism ==
State Highway 6 follows the Makarora River for the majority of its course from just south of Haast Pass. A popular short walk leads to its confluence with the Blue River, at the aptly named Blue Pools. Cameron Flat Campground is a convenient campsite with a cooking shelter and bathrooms directly off State Highway 6.

== Gallery ==
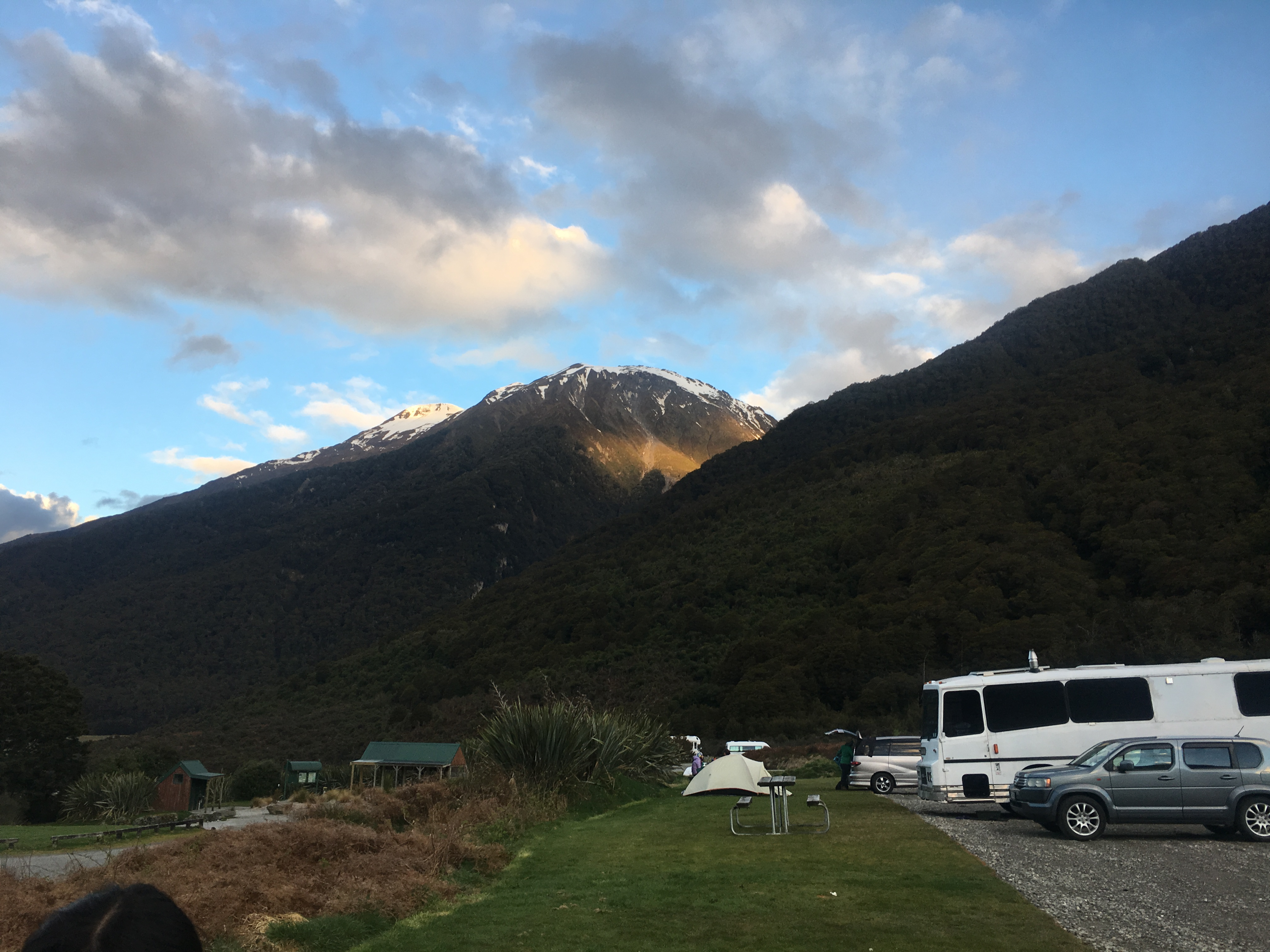
Cameron Flat Campground

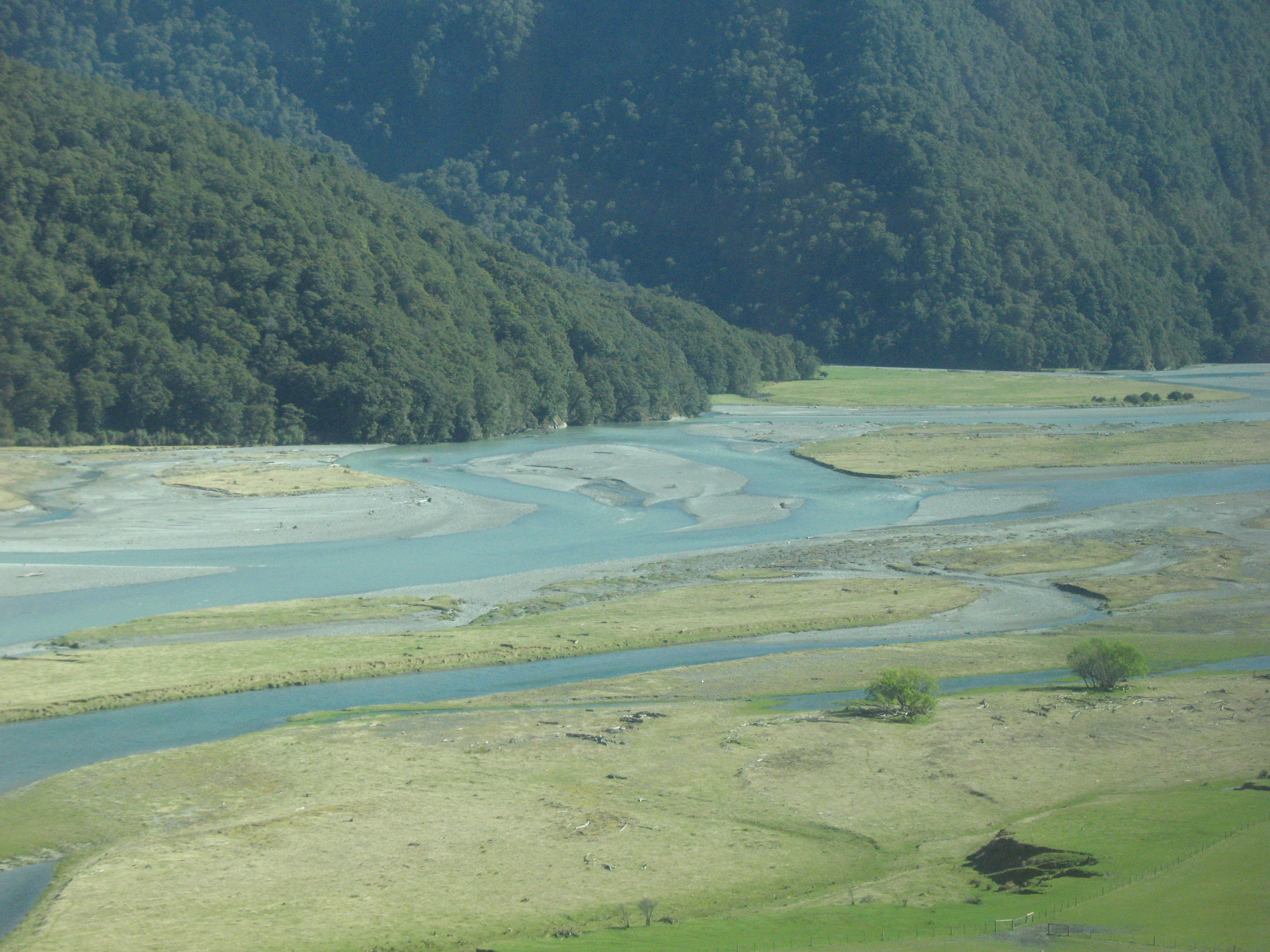
The Makarora River near West Makarora township

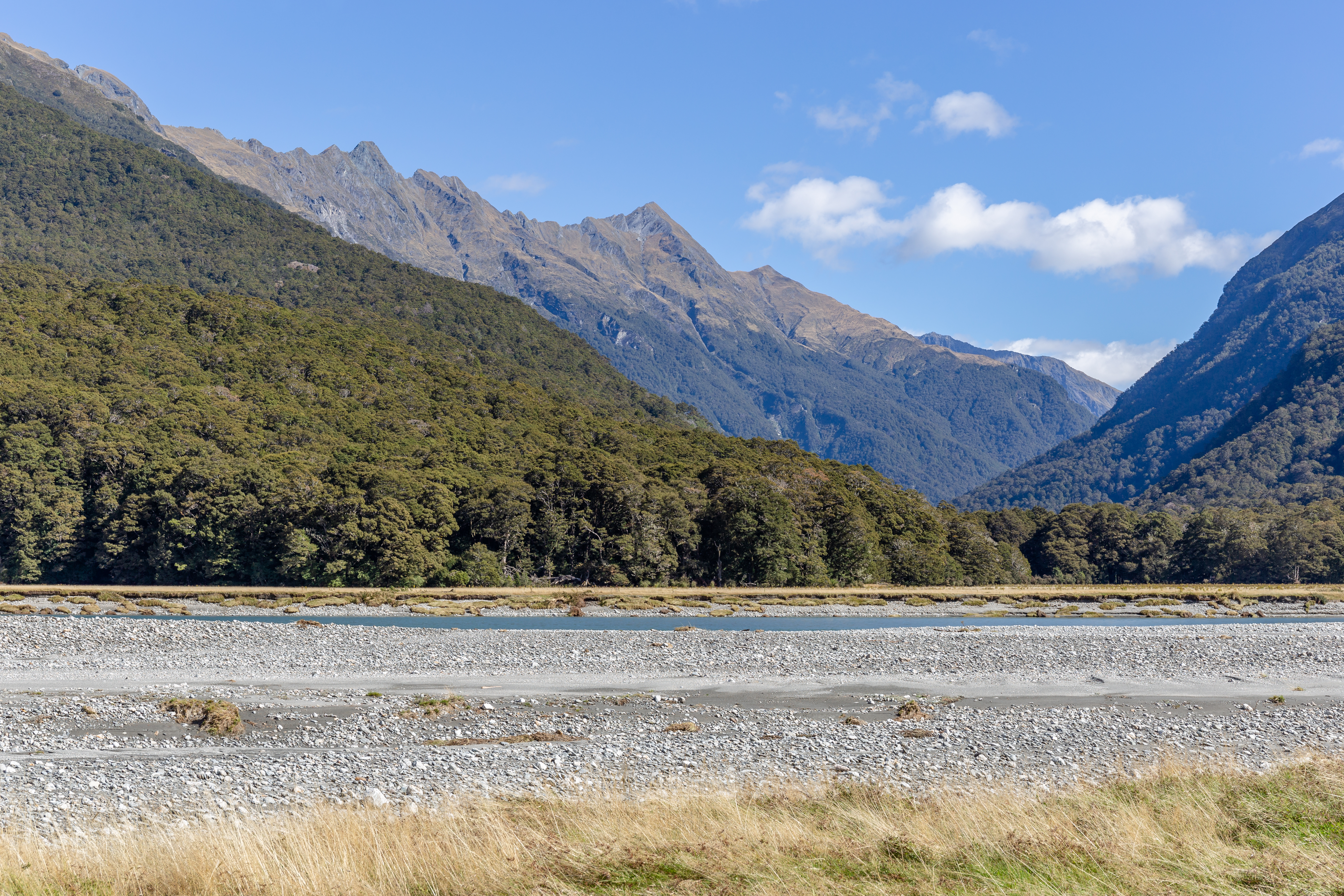
The Makarora River at Courtneys Flat

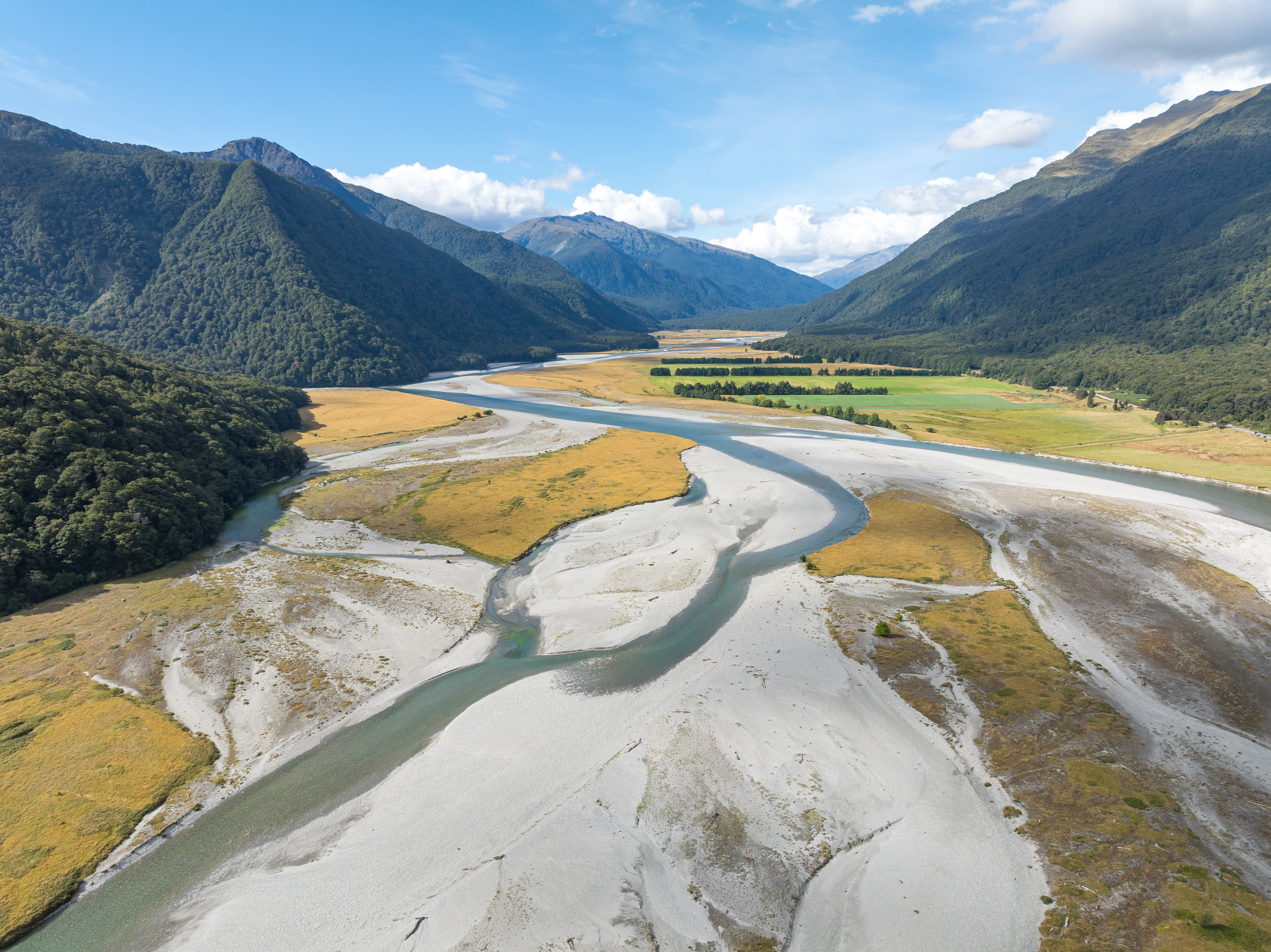
Aerial

== See also ==
- List of rivers of New Zealand
