= Makarora =

- Community
- Interactive map of Makarora
- Coordinates: 44°14′S 169°14′E
- Country: New Zealand
- Region: Otago
- Territorial authority: Queenstown-Lakes District
- Ward: Wānaka-Upper Clutha Ward
- Community: Wānaka-Upper Clutha Community
- Electorates: Waitaki; Te Tai Tonga (Māori)

Government
  - Territorial authority: Queenstown-Lakes District Council
  - Regional council: Otago Regional Council
  - Mayor of Queenstown-Lakes: John Glover
  - Waitaki MP: Miles Anderson
  - Te Tai Tonga MP: Tākuta Ferris
- Time zone: UTC+12 (NZST)
  - Summer (DST): UTC+13 (NZDT)
- Local iwi: Ngāi Tahu

Makarora is a small community within the Queenstown-Lakes District of the Otago region of the South Island of New Zealand.

It is situated on State Highway 6 on the eastern side of the Haast Pass and adjacent to the Makarora River.

Local tourism operators offer scenic plane flights and jetboating tours on the Makarora River, which is the border of the Mount Aspiring National Park. The 2022 film Nude Tuesday was shot at the Wonderland Lodge in Makarora.

Makarora Aerodrome is located alongside State Highway 6 and across the road from the Wonderland Lodge, its ICAO is NZWM and uses one runway (15/33). The airstrip is home to Southern Alps Air, which is also based in Wanaka

== Demographics ==
Makarora is part of the Outer Wānaka statistical area, which covers 3,176.08 km^{2} (1,226.29 sq mi) and had an estimated population of 450 as of June 2025, with a population density of 0.14 people per km^{2}.

Historical population
| Year | Pop. | ±% p.a. |
|---|---|---|
| 2006 | 336 | — |
| 2013 | 378 | +1.70% |
| 2018 | 399 | +1.09% |

Outer Wānaka had a population of 399 at the 2018 New Zealand census, an increase of 21 people (5.6%) since the 2013 census, and an increase of 63 people (18.8%) since the 2006 census. There were 162 households, comprising 204 males and 192 females, giving a sex ratio of 1.06 males per female. The median age was 45.1 years (compared with 37.4 years nationally), with 72 people (18.0%) aged under 15 years, 57 (14.3%) aged 15 to 29, 228 (57.1%) aged 30 to 64, and 36 (9.0%) aged 65 or older.

Ethnicities were 96.2% European/Pākehā, 10.5% Māori, 0.8% Asian, and 0.8% other ethnicities. People may identify with more than one ethnicity.

The percentage of people born overseas was 18.8, compared with 27.1% nationally.

Although some people chose not to answer the census's question about religious affiliation, 64.7% had no religion, and 29.3% were Christian.

Of those at least 15 years old, 87 (26.6%) people had a bachelor's or higher degree, and 21 (6.4%) people had no formal qualifications. The median income was $32,800, compared with $31,800 nationally. 63 people (19.3%) earned over $70,000 compared to 17.2% nationally. The employment status of those at least 15 was that 183 (56.0%) people were employed full-time, 78 (23.9%) were part-time, and 3 (0.9%) were unemployed.

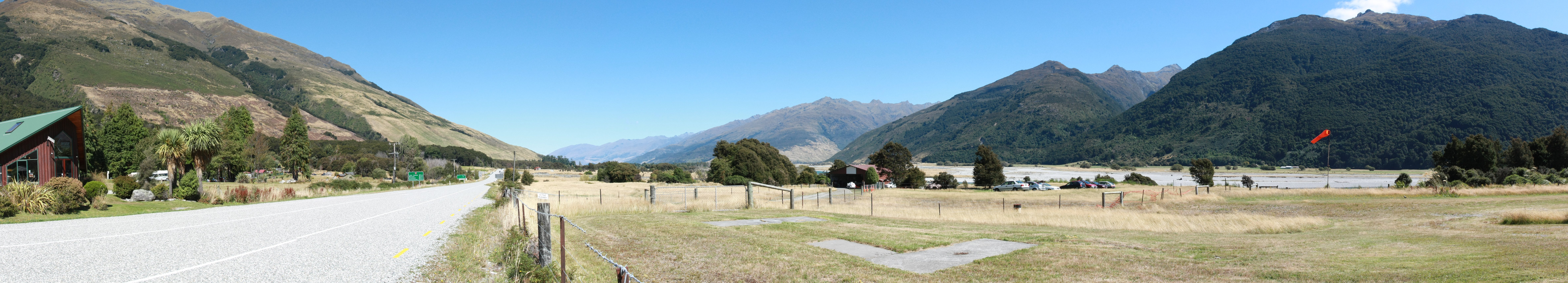
Panorama of Makarora as seen from State Highway 6

== Education ==
Makarora Primary School is a co-educational state primary school for Year 1 to 8 students, with a roll of 13 as of July 2026. The school was first established in 1895.
