= Te Naihi River =

- Route of the Te Naihi River
- Mouth of the Te Naihi River Te Naihi River (New Zealand)

Location
- Country: New Zealand
- Region: West Coast
- District: Westland

Physical characteristics
- Source: Te Naihi Saddle
  - coordinates: 44.1745°S 168.9519°E
- Mouth
  - location: Waiatoto River
  - coordinates: 44°07′05″S 168°48′49″E
- Length: 19 km (12 mi)

Basin features
- Progression: Te Naihi River → Waiatoto River → Jackson Bay / Okahu → Tasman Sea
- Tributaries
  - left: Murray River
  - right: Calliope Creek

The Te Naihi River is a river of the Westland District of New Zealand's South Island. It flows generally northwest to reach the Waiatoto River 35 kilometres (22 mi) southwest of Haast. Much of the river's length is within Mount Aspiring National Park.

== See also ==
- List of rivers of New Zealand
