= Jetboat =

Boat propelled by a jet of water ejected from the back of the craft

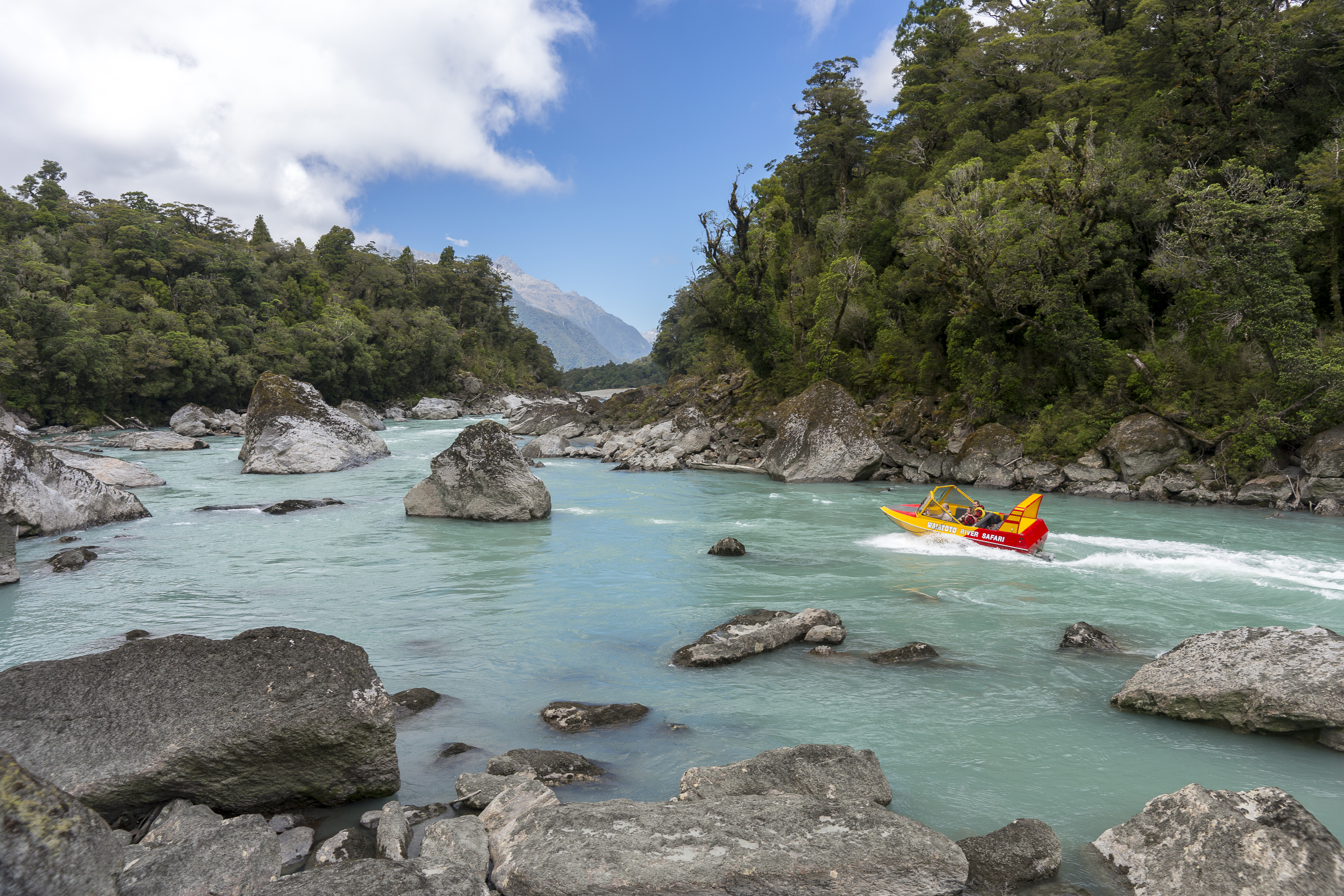
Jetboating on the Waitoto River in the West Coast region of New Zealand

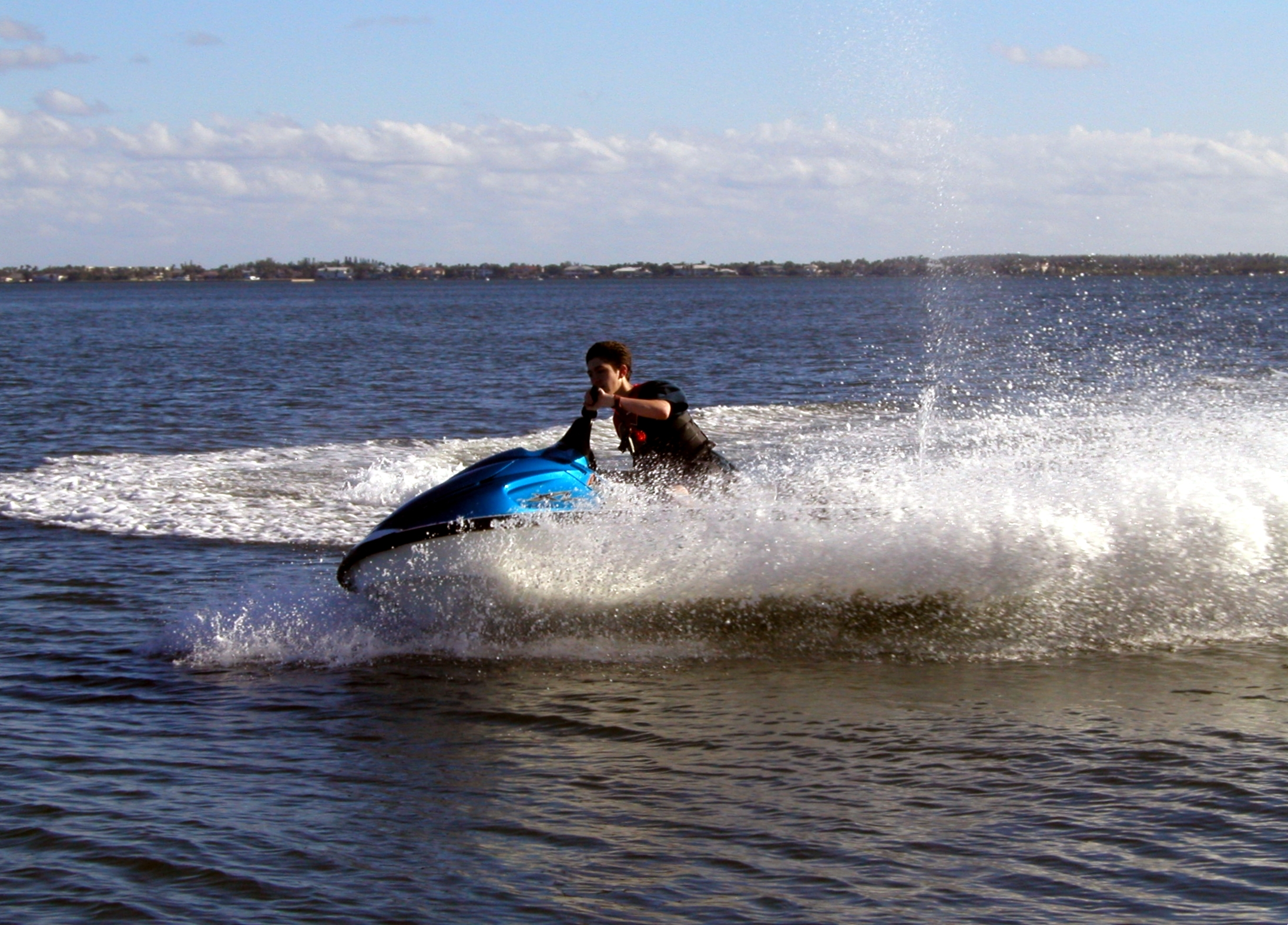
A rider on a Yamaha Waverunner XL in a high-speed turn

A jetboat is a boat propelled by a pump-jet mechanism. Unlike a conventional motorboat that uses one or more propellers submerged under the stern, a jetboat draws the water from under the boat in through an intake before expelling it through a nozzle as a fast rearward jet, which generates reactional thrust to propel the boat.

The modern jetboat was developed by New Zealand engineer Sir William Hamilton in the mid-1950s. His goal was a boat to run up the fast-flowing rivers of New Zealand that were too shallow for propellers. Previous attempts at waterjet propulsion had very short lifetimes, generally due to the inefficient design of the units and the fact that they offered few advantages over conventional propellers. Unlike these previous waterjet developments, such as Campini's and the Hanley Hydrojet, Hamilton had a specific need for a propulsion system to operate in very shallow water, and the waterjet proved to be the ideal solution. The popularity of the jet unit and jetboat increased rapidly. It was found the waterjet was better than propellers for a wide range of vessel types, and waterjets are now used widely for many high-speed vessels including passenger ferries, rescue craft, patrol boats and offshore supply vessels.

Jetboats are highly manoeuvrable, and many can be reversed from full speed and brought to a stop within little more than their own length, in a manoeuvre known as a "crash stop". The well known Hamilton turn or "jet spin" is a high-speed manoeuvre where the boat's engine throttle is cut, the steering is turned sharply and the throttle opened again, causing the boat to spin quickly around with a large spray of water.

There is no engineering limit to the size of jetboats, though whether they are useful depends on the type of application. Classic prop-drives are generally more efficient and economical at low speeds, up to about 20 knots (37 km/h; 23 mph), but as boat speed increases, the extra hull resistance generated by struts, rudders, shafts and so on means waterjets are more efficient up to 50 knots (93 km/h; 58 mph). For very large propellers turning at slow speeds, such as in tugboats, the equivalent size waterjet would be too big to be practical. The vast majority of waterjet units are therefore installed in high-speed vessels and in situations where shallow draught, maneuverability, and load flexibility are the main concerns.

The biggest jet-driven vessels are found in military use and the high-speed passenger and car ferry industry. South Africa's Valour-class frigates (approximately 120 metres or 390 feet long) and the United States' 127 metres (417 ft) long Littoral Combat Ship are among the biggest jet-propelled vessels as of 2020. Even these vessels are capable of performing "crash stops".

== Function ==
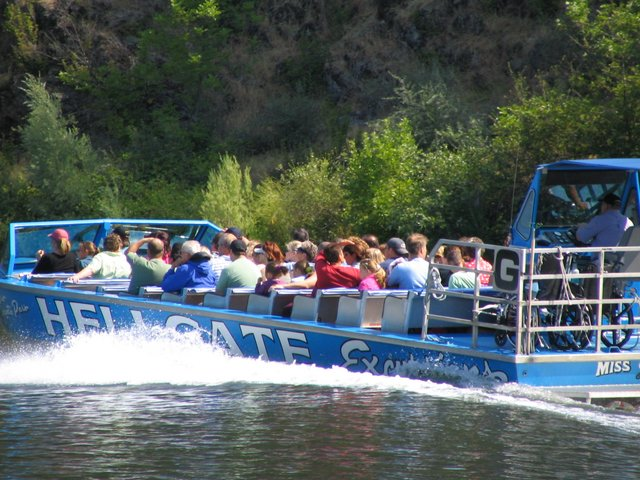
Jetboat on the Rogue River by Grants Pass, Oregon

A conventional screw propeller works within the body of water below a boat hull, effectively "screwing" through the water to drive a vessel forward by generating a difference in pressure between the forward and rear surfaces of the propeller blades and by accelerating a mass of water rearward. By contrast, a waterjet unit delivers a high-pressure "push" from the stern of a vessel by accelerating a volume of water as it passes through a specialised pump mounted above the waterline inside the boat hull. Both methods yield thrust due to Newton's third law— every action has an equal and opposite reaction.

In a jetboat, the waterjet draws water from beneath the hull, where it passes through a series of impellers and stators – known as stages – which increase the velocity of the waterflow. Most modern jets are single-stage, while older waterjets may have as many as three stages. The tail section of the waterjet unit extends out through the transom of the hull, above the waterline. This jetstream exits the unit through a small nozzle at high velocity to push the boat forward. Steering is accomplished by moving this nozzle to either side, or less commonly, by small gates on either side that deflect the jetstream. Because the jetboat relies on the flow of water through the nozzle for control, it is not possible to steer a conventional jetboat without the engine running.

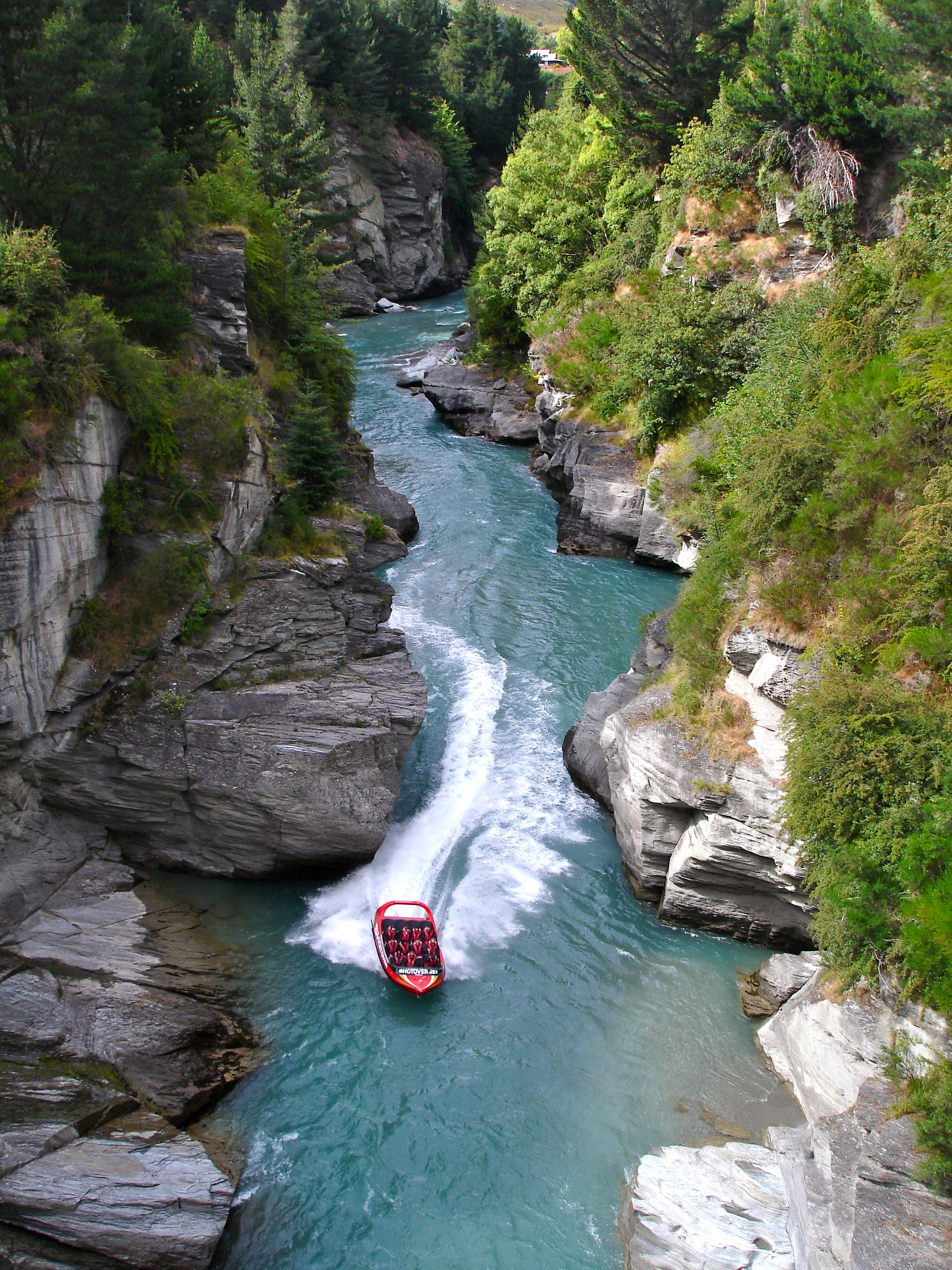
A jetboat on Shotover Canyon in New Zealand, the country for which jetboats were originally invented

Unlike conventional propeller systems where the rotation of the propeller is reversed to provide astern movement, a waterjet will continue to pump normally while a deflector is lowered into the jetstream after it leaves the outlet nozzle. This deflector redirects thrust forces forward to provide reverse thrust. Most highly developed reverse deflectors redirect the jetstream down and to each side to prevent recirculation of the water through the jet again, which may cause aeration problems, or increase reverse thrust. Steering is still available with the reverse deflector lowered so the vessel will have full maneuverability. With the deflector lowered about halfway into the jetstream, forward and reverse thrust are equal so the boat maintains a fixed position, but steering is still available to allow the vessel to turn on the spot – something which is impossible with a conventional single propeller.

Unlike hydrofoils, which use underwater wings or struts to lift the vessel clear of the water, standard jetboats use a conventional planing hull to ride across the water surface, with only the rear portion of the hull displacing any water. With the majority of the hull clear of the water, there is reduced drag, greatly enhancing speed and maneuverability, so jetboats are normally operated at planing speed. At slower speeds with less water pumping through the jet unit, the jetboat will lose some steering control and maneuverability and will quickly slow down as the hull comes off its planing state and hull resistance is increased. However, loss of steering control at low speeds can be overcome by lowering the reverse deflector slightly and increasing throttle – so an operator may increase thrust and thus control without increasing boat speed itself. A conventional river-going jetboat will have a shallow-angled (but not flat-bottomed) hull to improve its high-speed cornering control and stability, while also allowing it to traverse very shallow water. At speed, jetboats can be safely operated in less than 7.5 cm (3 inches) of water.

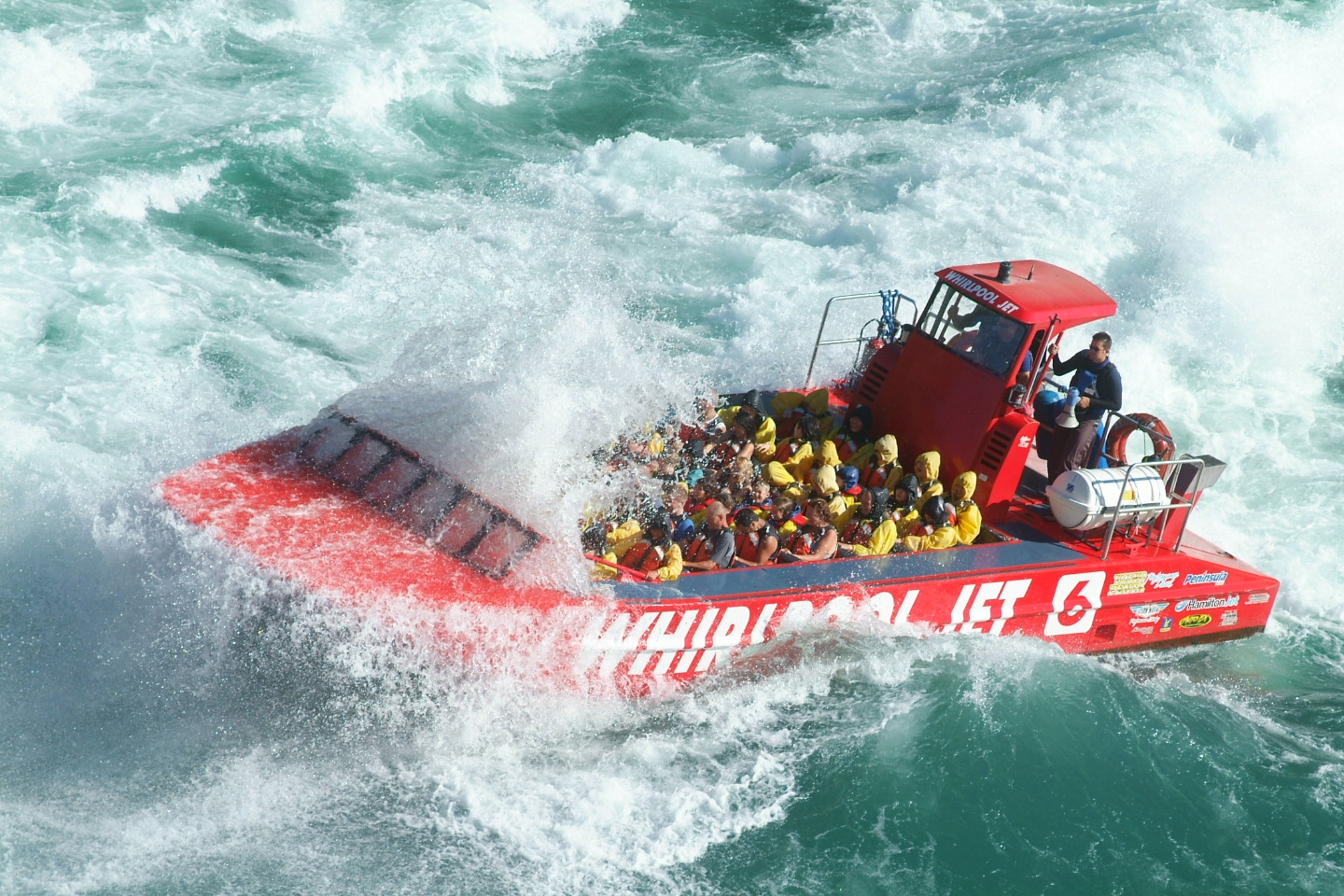
A jetboat powers through the rapids of Niagara Gorge, near Niagara Falls

One of the most significant breakthroughs, in the development of the waterjet, was to change the design so it expelled the jetstream above the water line, contrary to many people's intuition. Hamilton discovered early on that this greatly improved performance, compared to expelling below the waterline, while also providing a "clean" hull bottom (i.e. nothing protruding below the hull line) to allow the boat to skim through very shallow water. It makes no difference to the amount of thrust generated whether the outlet is above or below the waterline, but having it above the waterline reduces hull resistance and draught. Hamilton's first waterjet design had the outlet below the hull and actually in front of the inlet. This probably meant that disturbed water was entering the jet unit and reducing its performance, and the main reason why the change to above the waterline made such a difference.

== Applications ==
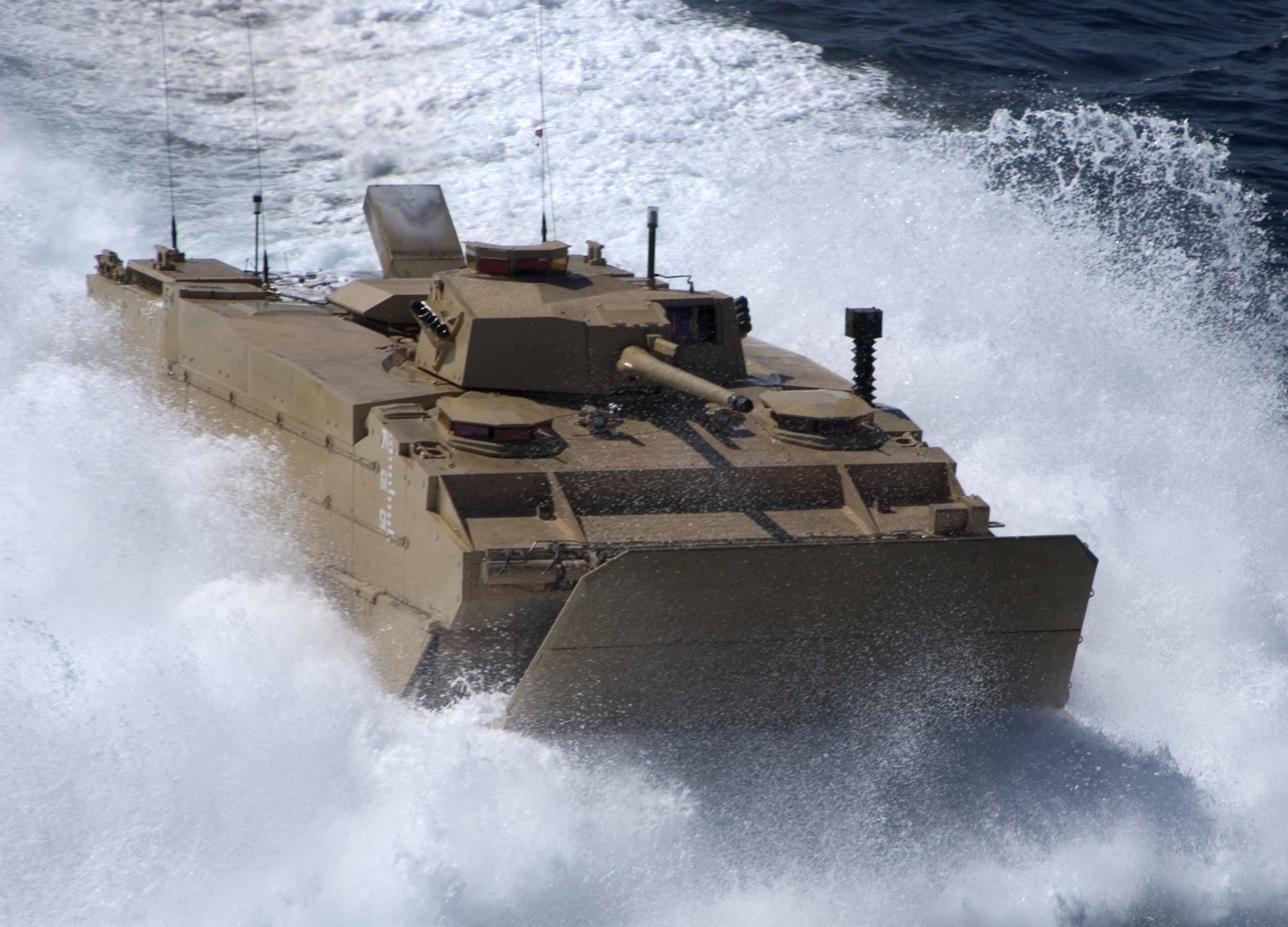
USMC Expeditionary Fighting Vehicle. Note the bow, which is extended into hydroplaning position.

Applications for jetboats include most activities where conventional propellers are also used, but in particular passenger ferry services, coastguard and police patrol, navy and military, adventure tourism (which is becoming increasingly popular around the globe), pilot boat operations, surf rescue, farming, fishing, exploration, pleasure boating, and other water activities where motor boats are used. Jetboats can also be raced for sport, both on rivers (World Champion Jet Boat Marathon held in Mexico, Canada, USA and New Zealand) and on specially designed racecourses known as sprint tracks. Recently there has been increasing use of jetboats in the form of rigid-hulled inflatable boats and as luxury yacht tenders. Many jetboats are small enough to be carried on a trailer and towed by car.

As jetboats have no external rotating parts they are safer for swimmers and marine life, though they can be struck by the hull. The safety benefit itself can sometimes be reason enough to use this type of propulsion.

In 1977, Sir Edmund Hillary led a jetboat expedition, titled "Ocean to Sky", from the mouth of the Ganges River to its source. One of the jetboats was sunk by a friend of Hillary.

== Drawbacks ==
The fuel efficiency and performance of a jetboat can be affected by anything that disrupts the smooth flow of water through the jet unit. For example, a plastic bag sucked onto the jet unit's intake grill can have quite an adverse effect.

Another disadvantage of jetboats appears to be that they are more sensitive to engine/jet unit mismatch, compared with the problem of engine/propeller mismatch in propeller-driven craft. If the jet-propulsion unit is not well-matched to the engine performance, excessive fuel consumption and poor performance can result.

== See also ==
- Personal water craft
- List of water sports
- Jet sprint boat racing
