= Waiatoto River =

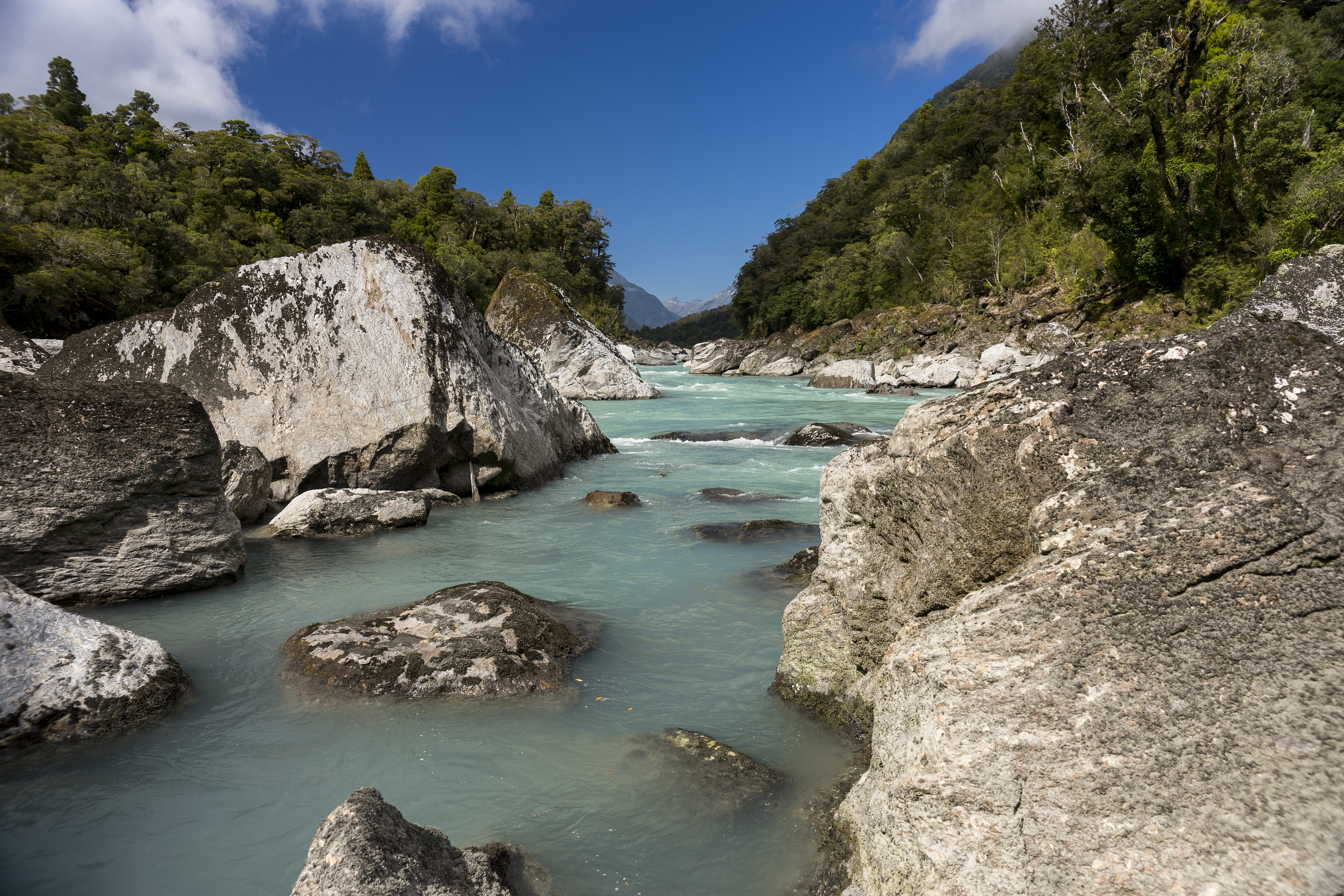
- Route of the Waiatoto River
- Mouth of the Waiatoto River Waiatoto River (New Zealand)
- Native name: Waitoto

Location
- Country: New Zealand
- Region: West Coast
- District: Westland

Physical characteristics
- Source: Volta Glacier
  - coordinates: 44.1745°S 168.9519°E
- Mouth
  - location: Jackson Bay / Okahu
  - coordinates: 44°07′05″S 168°48′49″E
- Length: 52 km (32 mi)

Basin features
- Progression: Waiatoto River → Jackson Bay / Okahu → Tasman Sea
- Tributaries
  - left: Top Creek, Seething Stream, The Splasher, Astrologer Creek, Idle Rivulet, Lonesome Creek, Fingals Creek, Recess Creek, Soak Stream, Glide-Down Creek, Lichen Creek, Sandies Creek, Madcap Torrent, Magic Water, Thrill Creek, Whizzing Water, Fizzle Brook, Ferny Rivulet, Tingling Brook, Micky Creek, Hubbub Torrent, Brewer Water, Nisson Creek, Nolans Creek, Hindley Creek
  - right: Graham River, Bettne River, Pearson River, Bonar River, Mossy Creek, Donald River, Chatter Creek, Dark Creek, Drake River, Taffy Creek, Oxtail Creek, Te Naihi River, Duncan Creek, Casey Creek, Jostling Water, Folly Creek, Glistening Torrent, Scamper Creek, Rubicon Rivulet, Palmer Creek, Compass Creek, Halcyon Creek

The Waiatoto River is a river of the West Coast of New Zealand's South Island. Formed from several small rivers which are fed by glaciers surrounding Mount Aspiring / Tititea, it flows north along a valley flanked in the west by the Haast Range before turning northwest to reach the Tasman Sea 20 kilometres (12 mi) southwest of Haast. Much of the river's length is within Mount Aspiring National Park.

The New Zealand Ministry for Culture and Heritage gives a translation of "water of blood" for Waiatoto.

== Gallery ==
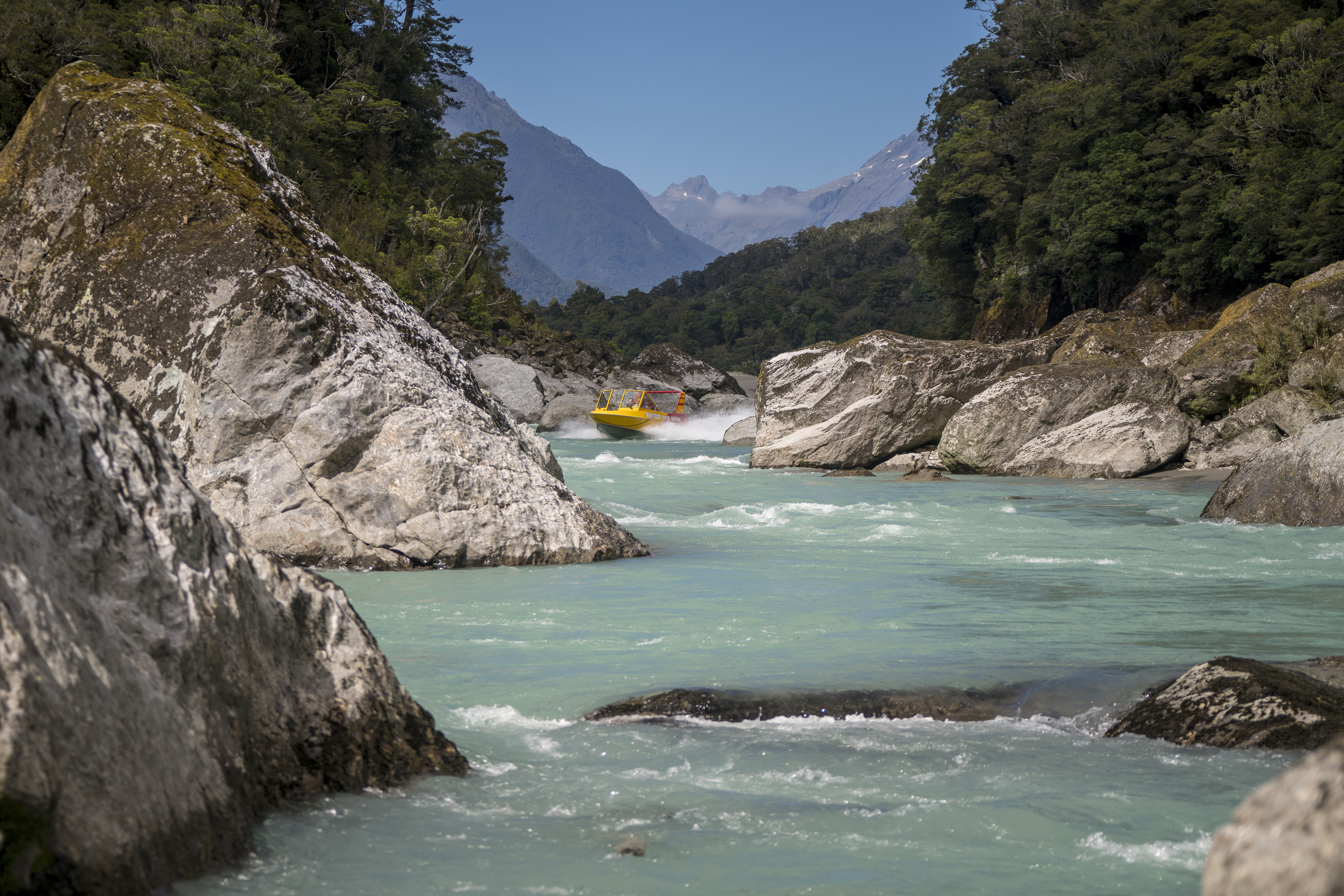

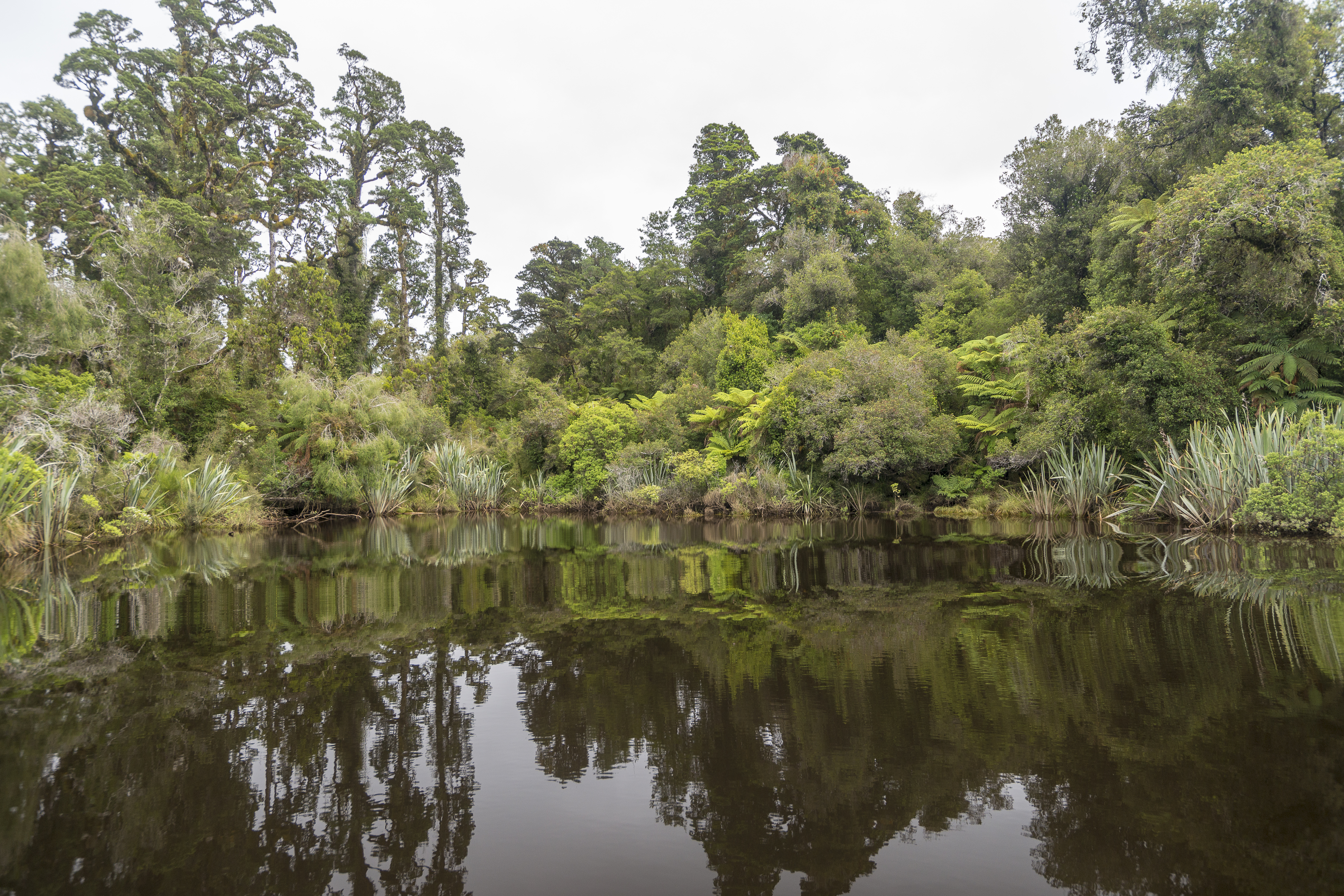

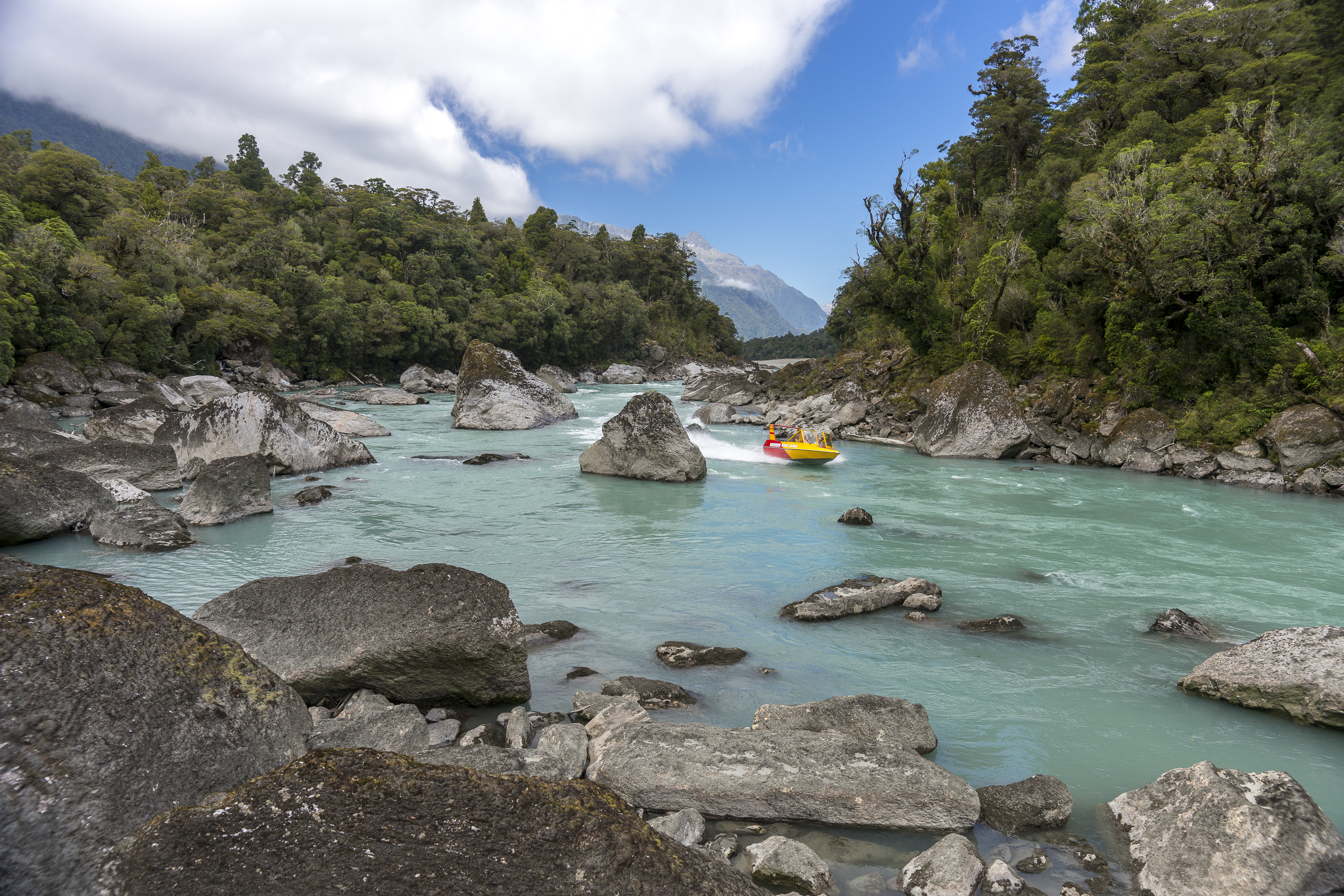

== See also ==
- List of rivers of New Zealand
