= Drake River =

River in New Zealand

- Route of the Drake River
- Mouth of the Drake River Drake River (South Island)
- Etymology: Named after Charlie Douglas, an explorer of the region

Location
- Country: New Zealand
- region: West Coast Region
- District: Westland District
- Protected area: Mount Aspiring National Park

Physical characteristics
- Source: Drake Range
  - location: Southern Alps / Kā Tiritiri o te Moana
  - coordinates: 44°13′2″S 168°53′38″E
  - elevation: 1,900 m (6,200 ft)
- Mouth: Waiatoto River
  - location: Drake Flats
  - coordinates: 44°11′0″S 168°46′56″E
  - elevation: 105 m (344 ft)
- Length: 13.7 kilometres (8.5 mi)

Basin features
- Progression: Drake River → Waiatoto River → Jackson Bay / Okahu
- River system: Waiatoto River

The Drake River is a river of New Zealand. It is located in southern Westland, and flows entirely within the Mount Aspiring National Park. The river follows a southerly course for seven kilometres before turning northeast to flow another five kilometres before reaching the Waiatoto River.

The tributaries of the river were probably surveyed and named by Mueller in 1885.

There is potential for a 30 MW power-generating plant at the junction of the Drake and Waiatoto Rivers.

== See also ==
- List of rivers of New Zealand
