= Wilkin River =

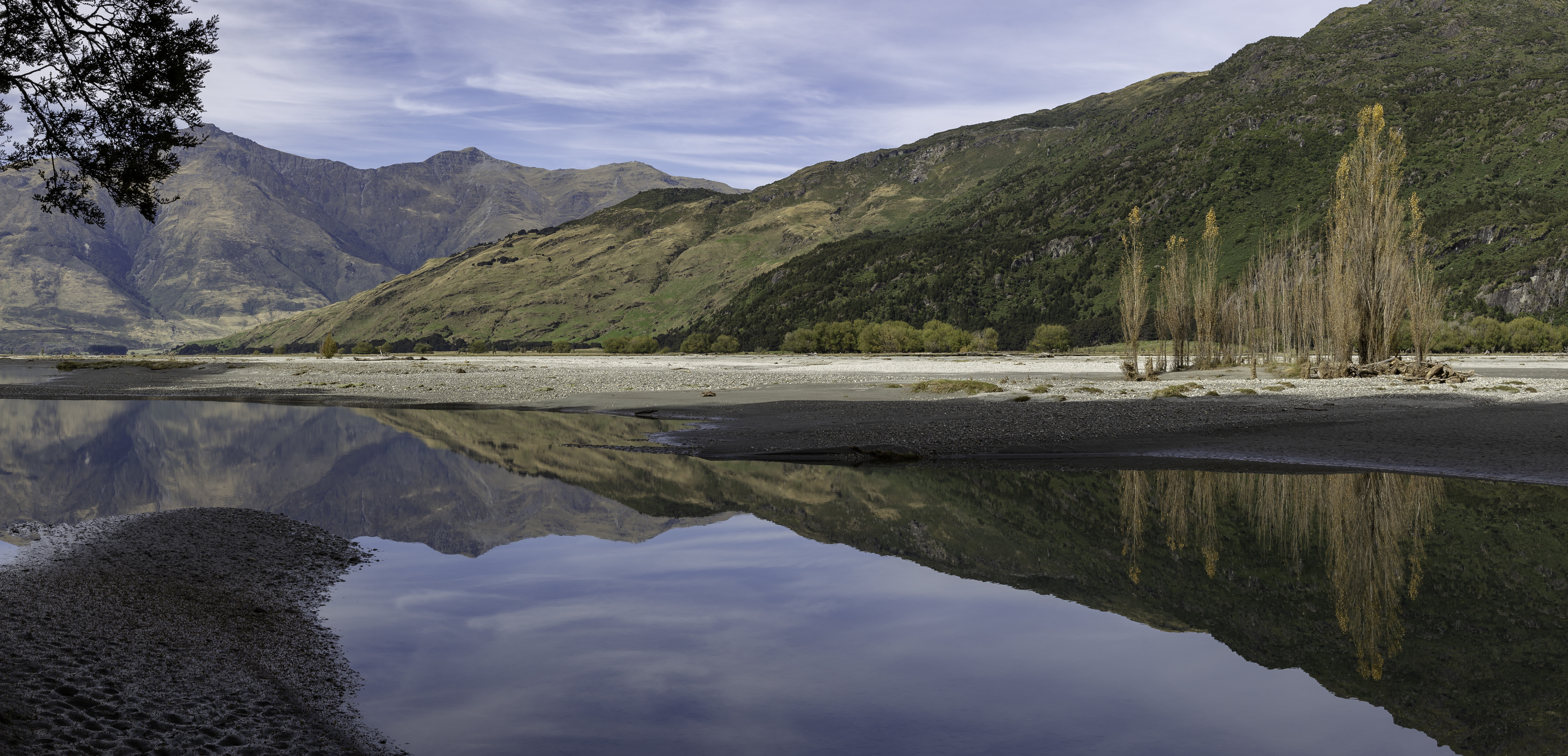
- Wilkin River close to its confluence with Makarora River
- Route of the Wilkin River
- Mouth of the Wilkin River Wilkin River (New Zealand)
- Native name: Ōtānenui (Māori)

Location
- Country: New Zealand
- Region: Otago
- District: Queenstown-Lakes

Physical characteristics
- Source: Wilkin River North Branch
  - coordinates: 44.2152°S 168.9215°E
- 2nd source: Wilkin River South Branch
  - location: Rabbit Pass
  - coordinates: 44.3123°S 168.8491°E
- Mouth
  - location: Makarora River
  - coordinates: 44°16′10″S 169°10′53″E

Basin features
- Progression: Wilkin River → Makarora River → Lake Wānaka → Clutha River / Mata-Au → Pacific Ocean
- Tributaries
  - left: Wonderland Stream, Newland Stream, Siberia Stream

The Wilkin River is a river in the Otago region of New Zealand, flowing into Lake Wānaka.

The river was named after Robert Wilkin, who was one of the early pastoral runholders in the Wānaka district.

It lies within the Mount Aspiring National Park

== See also ==
- List of rivers of New Zealand
