= List of rivers of the Marlborough District =

The following is a list of rivers in the Marlborough Region. The list is arranged in alphabetical order with tributaries indented under their downstream parent's name.

- Awatere River
  - Blairich River
  - Cam River
  - Castle River
  - Dane River
  - Kennet River
  - Hodder River
    - Shin River
  - Jordon River
  - McRae River
  - Medway River
  - Penk River
  - Tone River
  - Winterton River
- Blind (Otūwhero) River
- Flaxbourne River
- Graham River
- Kaituna River
  - Okaramio River
- Ōpaoa River
  - Fairhall River
  - Omaka River
  - Taylor River
    - Branch River
- Te Hoiere / Pelorus River
  - Rai River
    - Brown River
    - Opouri River
      - Tunakino River
    - Ronga River
  - Rainy River
  - Tinline River
  - Wakamarina River
- Waiau Toa / Clarence River
  - Acheron River
    - Guide River
    - Saxton River
    - Servern River
      - Alma River
    - Yarra River
  - Dillon River
  - Gloster River
  - Hossack River
  - Tweed River
- Waima River
- Wairau River
  - Branch River
    - Leatham River
  - Goulter River
  - Hamilton River
  - Marchburn River
  - Ōhinemahuta River
  - Tuamarina River
  - Waihopai River
    - Avon River
      - Teme River
      - Tummil River
    - Spray River
  - Waikakaho River
  - Wye River
