= Shin River (New Zealand) =

Coordinates: 41°54′S 173°40′E

Location
- Country: New Zealand

Physical characteristics
- Source
  - location: Inland Kaikoura Range
- Mouth
  - location: Hodder River
- Length: 10 km (6.2 mi)

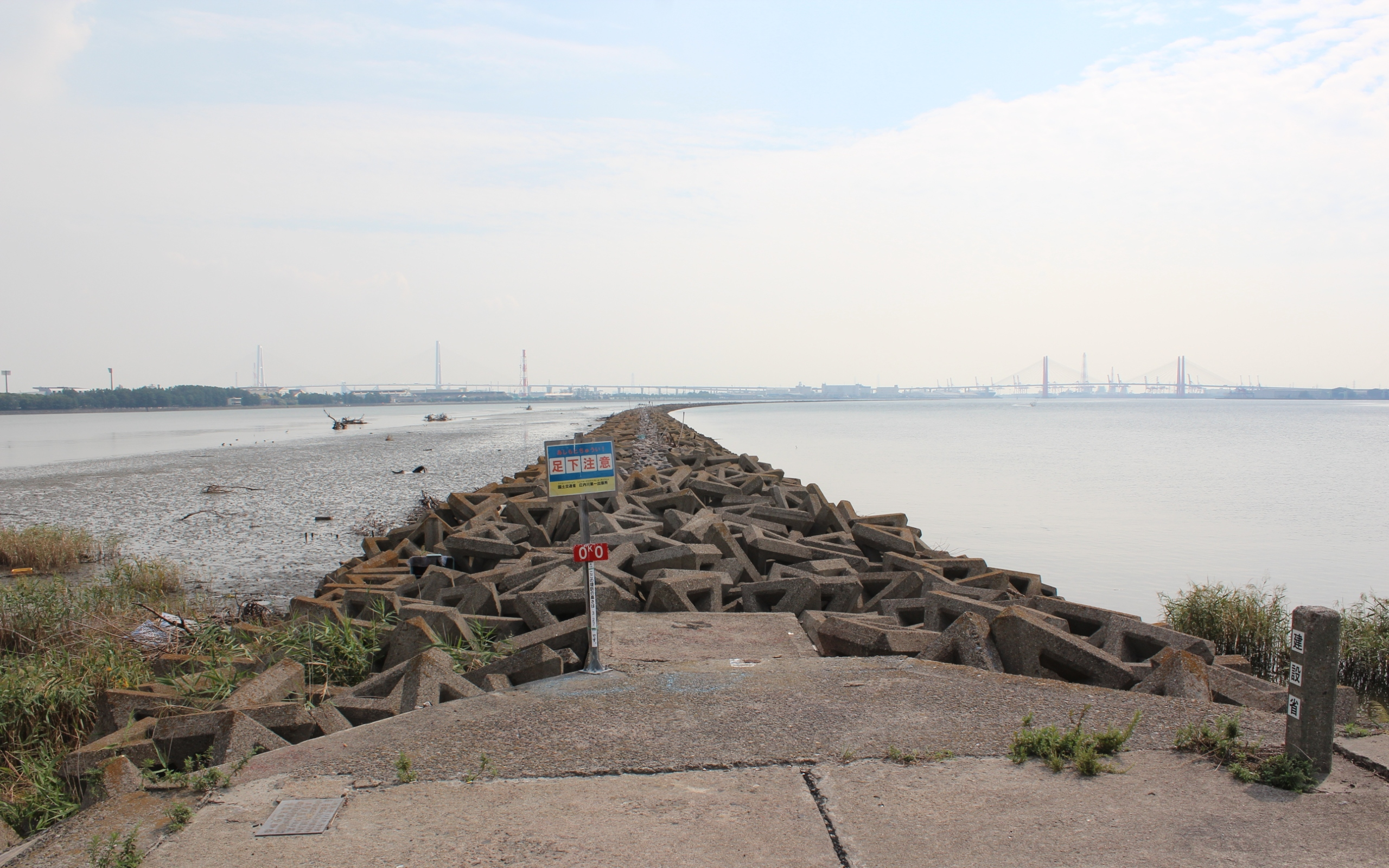
River mouth of Shōnai River and Shin River

The Shin River is a river in New Zealand's Marlborough Region. The 10-km long Shin rises from its sources in the Inland Kaikoura Range and flows north to reach the Hodder River, which is part of the Awatere River system, located 40 kilometres (25 mi) southwest of Seddon.

== See also ==
- List of rivers of New Zealand
