= Wards Pass =

- Interactive map of Wards Pass
- Elevation: 1,145 metres (3,757 ft)
- Traversed by: Molesworth-Hanmer Road; HVDC Inter-Island

Third Approach
- Location: New Zealand
- Range: Rachel Range
- Coordinates: 42°05′26″S 173°11′34″E

Wards Pass, 1,145 metres or 3,757 feet above sea level, is an alpine pass in the Rachel Range of the Inland Kaikoura Ranges of New Zealand's northern South Island. It lies between the valleys of the upper Acheron and Awatere rivers and was discovered by the surveyor Joseph Ward and his brother-in-law, Cyrus Goulter, in March 1847.

The pass is on the Molesworth-Hanmer Road within Molesworth Station, 8 kilometres (5 mi) southwest of the station headquarters.

The HVDC Inter-Island line transverses the pass on its route between Benmore Dam and the Cook Strait cable terminal at Fighting Bay in the Marlborough Sounds.
