= Clifford Bay =

Bay in the northeast of the South Island of New Zealand

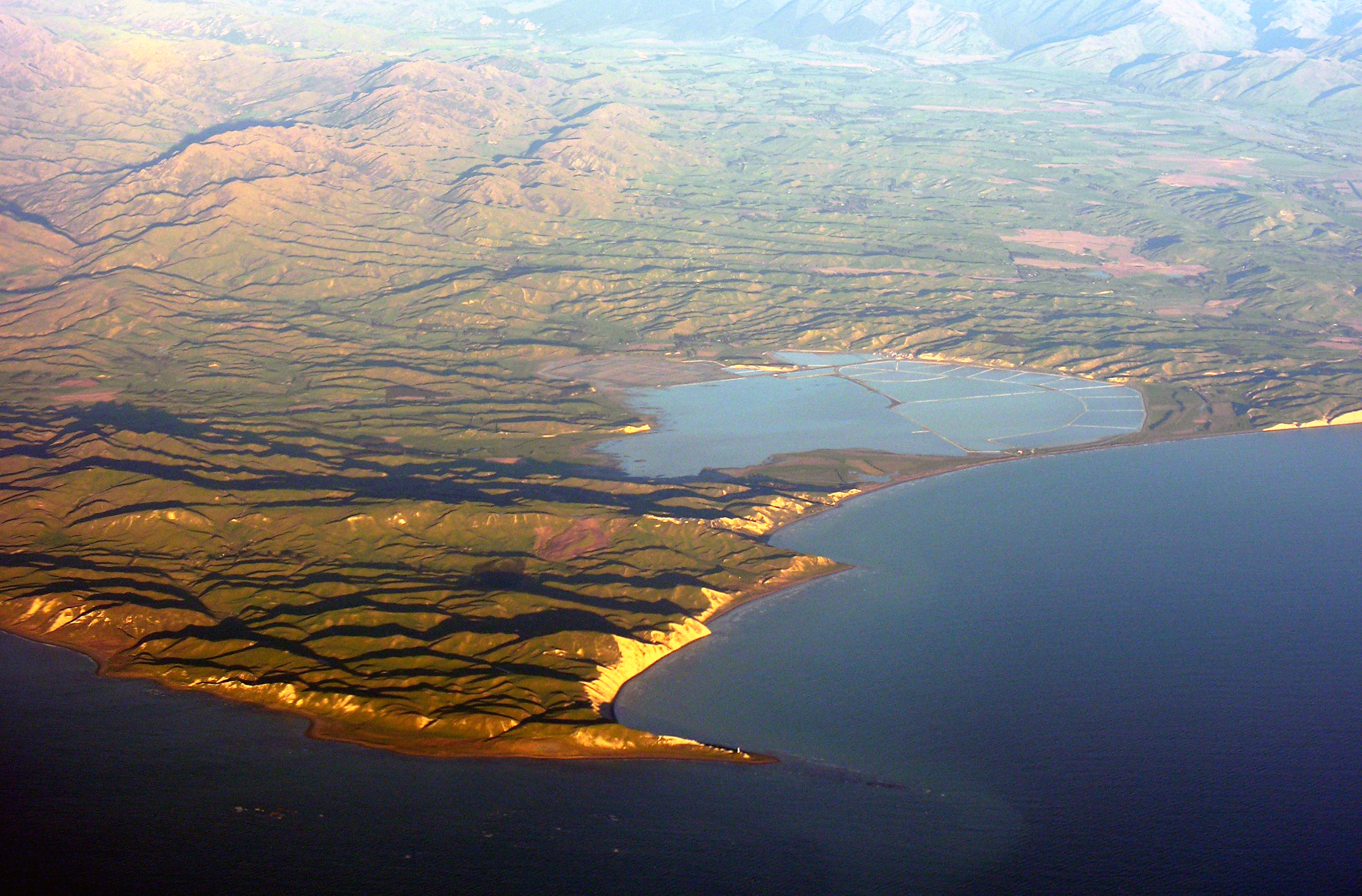
- Aerial image of the area around Lake Grassmere / Kapara Te Hau, with Clifford Bay in the lower right of the image.

- Location of Clifford Bay in New Zealand
- Interactive map of Clifford Bay
- Location: Marlborough District, South Island
- Coordinates: 41.682°S 174.215°E
- Type: Bay
- Etymology: Named after Sir Charles Clifford, 1st Baronet
- Part of: Cook Strait
- River sources: Awatere River, Otuwhero River
- Basin countries: New Zealand
- Max. length: 5 kilometres (3.1 mi)
- Max. width: 16 kilometres (9.9 mi)
- Shore length^{1}: 22 kilometres (14 mi)
- ^{1} Shore length is not a well-defined measure.

Clifford Bay is a bay in the northeast of the South Island of New Zealand, in the Marlborough Region. It lies between Te Koko-o-Kupe / Cloudy Bay to the northwest, and Cape Campbell to the southeast. The bay's shoreline is dominated by extensive solar salt extraction works at Lake Grassmere / Kapara Te Hau, close to the southern end of the bay. The area has also regularly been explored as a potential location for an interisland ferry terminal connected to Wellington, but this has never progressed to construction.

== Inter-island ferry terminal ==
Since the 1920s, there have been various proposals for an inter-island port and ferry terminal to replace Picton. Plans have never proceeded beyond an investigation stage, often due to the capital costs.

=== 1990s proposal ===
In 1997, the then operator of the Interisland Line, Tranz Rail, proposed a new ferry terminal be built at Clifford Bay.

=== 2010s proposal ===
In May 2011, plans were announced to revisit the development of a port at Clifford Bay, using a mix of private and public funding. Such a port would reduce both sailing time across the Cook Strait from Wellington and the surface distance to Christchurch. It would also allow ferries to operate at higher speeds than they can in the ecologically sensitive Marlborough Sounds and remove the steep grades on the Main North Line between Blenheim and Picton.

While a new port at Clifford Bay would have affected the economy of Picton, there were positive options to refocus Picton as a tourist centre, and the gateway to the Marlborough Sounds.

In November 2013, then-Minister of Transport Gerry Brownlee announced that the Government would not be building a new port at Clifford Bay, putting an end to two years of speculation.
