= Jordan River (New Zealand) =

River in New Zealand

Coordinates: 41°50′S 173°44′E

The Jordan River is a name given to two minor rivers in the South Island of New Zealand, one in Marlborough, the other in Tasman. Further south, there is also a 4 km (2.5 mi) long stream in Otago named River Jordan.

The river in Marlborough flows from the northern flanks of the Inland Kaikōura Range into the Awatere River and lies within the borders of the Molesworth Station.
