= Winterton River =

Location
- Country: New Zealand
- Region: Marlborough

Physical characteristics
- Source: Inland Kaikoura Range
  - coordinates: 41°02′42″S 173°33′22″E
- Mouth: Awatere River
  - coordinates: 41°57′14″S 173°31′37″E
  - elevation: 545 m (1,790 ft)
- Length: 15 km (9 mi)

Basin features
- Progression: Winterton River → Awatere River

The Winterton River is a river of the Marlborough Region of New Zealand's South Island. It flows generally north from the Inland Kaikoura Range to reach the Awatere River 30 kilometres (19 mi) northeast of Molesworth Station.

== See also ==
- List of rivers of New Zealand
