= Dillon River (New Zealand) =

Coordinates: 42°23′47″S 173°04′42″E

Location
- Country: New Zealand
- Location: Marlborough Region, South Island

Physical characteristics
- Source
  - location: Inland Kaikōura Range
- Mouth
  - location: Confluence with Waiau Toa / Clarence River
  - elevation: 670 m (2,200 ft)
- Length: 28 km (17 mi)

Basin features
- River system: Waiau Toa / Clarence River system

The Dillon River of the Marlborough Region of New Zealand rises in the Inland Kaikōura Range near Carters Saddle. From its source, it flows south-west for 28 kilometres (17 mi) to join with the upper Waiau Toa / Clarence River 20 kilometres (12 mi) northeast of Hanmer Springs. The river's course lies largely parallel with that of the Acheron River, which flows 8 kilometres (5 mi) to the west. The river was named after the 19th-century settler Constantine Dillon, who owned a sheep run near the Omaka River.

== See also ==
- List of rivers of New Zealand
