= McRae River =

Coordinates: 41°51′S 173°43′E

Location
- Country: New Zealand

Physical characteristics
- Source
  - location: Inland Kaikoura Range
- Mouth
  - location: Awatere River
- Length: 8 km (5.0 mi)

The McRae River is a river of the Marlborough Region of New Zealand's South Island. It flows north from its sources in the Inland Kaikoura Range to meet the Awatere River 40 kilometres (25 mi) southwest of Seddon.

== See also ==
- List of rivers of New Zealand
