= Medway River (New Zealand) =

Coordinates: 41°46′S 173°52′E

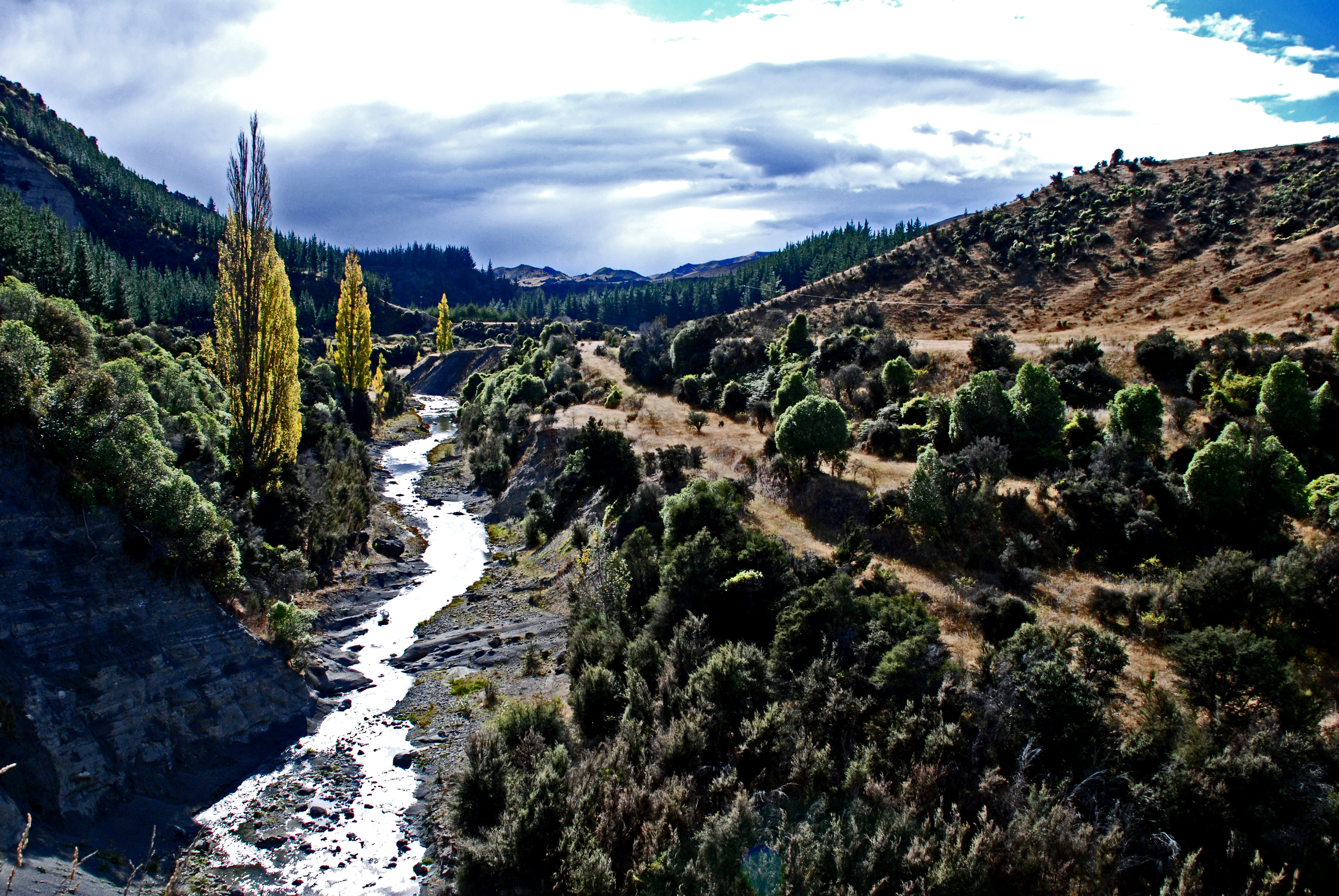
- Medway River

Location
- Country: New Zealand

Physical characteristics
- Source
  - location: Inland Kaikoura Range
- Mouth
  - location: Awatere River
- Length: 22 km (14 mi)

The Medway River of the Marlborough Region of New Zealand's South Island originates in Inland Kaikoura Range. It flows northwest then north from its sources, to meet the Awatere River 20 kilometres (12 mi) southwest of Seddon.

== See also ==
- List of rivers of New Zealand
