= Teme (disambiguation) =

The River Teme is a river in England and Wales.

Teme may also refer to:

== Rivers ==
- Teme River, New Zealand

== Other uses ==
- Teme (philosophy), a term meaning technological meme
- Teme language, a language of Nigeria
- True Equator, Mean Equinox frame used in the Earth-centered inertial coordinate system
- Trade Union for Theatre and Media (Teme), Finland
- Teme Sejko, rear-admiral and commander of the Albanian navy

== See also ==
- Temes (disambiguation)
