= Hodder River =

Coordinates: 41°53′S 173°38′E

Location
- Country: New Zealand

Physical characteristics
- Source
  - location: Inland Kaikoura Range
- Mouth
  - location: Awatere River
- Length: 16 km (9.9 mi)

The Hodder River is a river of the northeastern South Island of New Zealand. It flows north from the northwestern slopes of Mount Tapuae-o-Uenuku, joining with the Awatere River 40 kilometres (25 mi) southwest of Seddon.

== See also ==
- List of rivers of New Zealand
