= Tone River (New Zealand) =

Coordinates: 42°02′S 173°25′E

Location
- Country: New Zealand

Physical characteristics
- Source
  - location: Inland Kaikoura Range
- Mouth
  - location: Awatere River
- Length: 20 km (12 mi)

The Tone River is a river of the Marlborough Region of New Zealand's South Island. It flows generally north from its sources in the Inland Kaikoura Range to reach the Awatere River 17 kilometres (11 mi) northeast of Molesworth Station, a high country cattle station and New Zealand's largest farm, at over 1,800 square kilometres (440,000 acres).

== See also ==
- List of rivers of New Zealand
