= Penk River =

Coordinates: 41°50′S 173°44′E

Location
- Country: New Zealand

Physical characteristics
- Source
  - location: Mount Horrible
- Mouth
  - location: Awatere River
- Length: 13 km (8.1 mi)

The Penk River is a river of the Marlborough Region of New Zealand's South Island. It flows predominantly south from its origins on the slopes of Mount Horrible to reach the Awatere River 35 kilometres (22 mi) southwest of Seddon.

== See also ==
- List of rivers of New Zealand
