= Dane River =

Coordinates: 42°03′43″S 173°20′13″E

Location
- Country: New Zealand

Physical characteristics
- Source
  - location: Inland Kaikoura Range
- Mouth
  - location: Awatere River
  - elevation: 790 m (2,590 ft)
- Length: 7 km (4.3 mi)

New Zealand's Dane River is a tributary of the Awatere River. It flows north for 7 kilometres (4 mi), reaching its confluence to the northeast of Molesworth Station, a high country cattle station and, at over 1,800 square kilometres (440,000 acres), New Zealand's largest farm.

== See also ==
- List of rivers of New Zealand
