= Cam River (Marlborough) =

Coordinates: 41°52′S 173°40′E

Location
- Country: New Zealand

Physical characteristics
- Source
  - location: Inland Kaikoura Range
- Mouth
  - location: Awatere River

The Cam River is a river of the South Island of New Zealand. It flows north from the Inland Kaikoura Range and is a tributary of the Awatere River.

== See also ==
- List of rivers of New Zealand
