= 2021 central New Zealand floods =

2021 New Zealand floods
- Date: 17–18 July 2021
- Location: central New Zealand
- Property damage: $140.47 million

The 2021 central New Zealand floods were the result of a torrential rainstorm that affected central New Zealand between 17 and 18 July 2021. This storm led to flooding in the West Coast's Buller District, the Tasman District, and the Marlborough Region in the South Island, prompting the evacuations of residents and the declaration of a state of emergency. Flooding also impacted the Wellington region.

The floods came nearly two months after flooding in Canterbury and just over a month before flooding in Auckland.

== Meteorological history ==
According to the National Institute of Water and Atmospheric Research (NIWA), large areas of New Zealand experienced above normal rainfall and above normal temperatures in July 2021, making that month the sixth-equal warmest July on record. The mean temperate for July 2021 was 8.9 Celsius, which is 1.1 Celsius warmer than the 1981–2010 average. According to NIWA meteorologist Chris Brandoloni, the previous month of June 2021 was the warmest recorded, and that the first seven months of the year were also the warmest since records began in 1909. Brandoloni attributed the extreme rain and heat events to climate change.

The extreme rain event of 15–18 July brought over 690 mm (27 in) of rain to parts of the West Coast Region in under 72 hours. The Buller River also experienced the country's largest flood flows since 1926 as a result of the deluge. Parts of the West Coast experienced 300 mm (12 in) of rain over the weekend of 17–18 July, roughly a month's average rainfall. The heavy rain causes rivers to break their banks and landslips, leading to the evacuation of 2,000 residents.

In addition to the West Coast, the South Island's Marlborough Region, Nelson, Tasman District, Canterbury high country, and North Otago experienced well above average rainfall (more than 149% of the normal rainfall). Parts of the Marlborough Region recorded more than 300 mm (12 in) of rain in the 48-hour period between 16 and 18 July. Onamalutu, just west of Renwick, recorded 212 mm (8.3 in) of rain on 17 July while Tunakino Valley recorded 103.5 mm (4.07 in) on 16 July. River levels within the region jumped with the Wairau River at Barnett's Bank near Tuamarina reaching almost 9 m (30 ft) and a peak flow of 6,040 cumecs on 17 July. Parts of the North Island (including the Northland Region, the inland Bay of Plenty, the Wellington Region, and the Kāpiti Coast) also experienced above average levels of rainfall.

Climate expert Dr. Luke Harrington also attributed the heavy rain in the West Coast to climate change and an atmospheric river carrying moisture from the tropics. The high rainfall was also exacerbated by warmer than average sea surface temperatures, another effect of climate change. Harrington predicted that such atmospheric rivers would become more intense and frequent throughout the world as a result of climate change. The Buller and Marlborough Regions were more vulnerable to stormy weather since their geographical location meant they were trapped between incoming moisture-laden atmospheric rivers and the Southern Alps, causing the air to compress and the rain to fall.

== Effects ==
=== Evacuations ===
As a result of the flooding, 430 residents were evacuated from Spring Creek near Blenheim, Tuamarina township in the Marlborough Region on the evening of 17 July. In addition, about half of Westport's 4,600 residents were evacuated that same day. By 18 July, 1,000 displaced residents were still unable to return.

On 19 July, a state of emergency was declared in the Marlborough Region. Nine hundred people were evacuated across 500 properties in the region, including properties in Renwick, Spring Creek, and Tuamarina. Dozens of roads were closed in the region, and an order to boil drinking water was instated in the Wairau Valley. Deputy Mayor Nadine Taylor described the 2021 flood as the region's largest recorded flood, exceeding the 1983 flood.

=== Homes and structures ===
On 20 July, West Coast Emergency Management reported that 89 houses in the region had suffered severe or total damage (red category) and 400 had suffered moderate damage as a result of the torrential rain and flooding. By 21 July, Buller District Mayor Jamie Cleine reported that 22 homes in the district were still "red stickered," meaning that residents could not return home to live before repair work was done. A hundred people still remained the area's three evacuation centres (one of which was a school).

The flooding caused millions of dollars in damages and damaged 563 homes in Westport; with 70 being red stickered and 393 being yellow stickered. By mid-October 2021, 450 Westport homes remained uninhabitable or damaged with 140 residents in temporary accommodation. In July 2022, Stuff reported that over 400 homes in Westport had not been fully repaired since the floods that struck the city in July 2021. Of the 563 flood damaged homes, just over 100 had fully completed their repairs.

=== Insurance claims ===
The event resulted in $140.47 million dollars of insurance claimed damage in New Zealand. Of this, $97.2 million was in the West Coast region, $17.88 million was in the Wellington region, $17.35 million was in the upper South Island, and $8.04 million was in the rest of the North Island.

== Responses ==
In response to the flooding in the West Coast Region, the New Zealand Defence Force deployed more than 30 personnel and soldiers, four Unimogs, and a Royal New Zealand Air Force helicopter. Defence Force personnel conducted emergency food drops to rural areas, cooked for up to 300 emergency responders, and assisted with the evacuation of over 800 properties.

On 18 July, Acting Minister for Emergency Management Kris Faafoi announced that the Government would provide $NZ 600,000 in emergency aid to affected regions. Minister of Agriculture Damien O'Connor also announced financial support for farmers. The West Coast District Health Board stated that it would take months to clean affected homes.

In July 2022, the Buller District Council and the West Coast Regional Council submitted a NZ$54 million business case for the West Coast region which includes investing in flood walls, subsidising people to move from flood-prone areas, and investing in Westport's stormwater system.
