= Kennet River (New Zealand) =

Coordinates: 42°02′S 173°23′E

Location
- Country: New Zealand

Physical characteristics
- Mouth
  - location: Awatere River
- Length: 12 km (7.5 mi)

The Kennet River is a river of the northeast of New Zealand's South Island. It flows 13 kilometres (8 mi) northwest of Molesworth Stations south, joining the upper Awatere River.

== See also ==
- List of rivers of New Zealand
