= Tweed River (New Zealand) =

- Location of the Tweed River

Physical characteristics
- Source: Robinson Saddle
  - location: Inland Kaikōura Range
- Mouth
  - location: Confluence with the Waiau Toa / Clarence River
  - coordinates: 42°15′S 173°18′E

Basin features
- River system: Waiau Toa / Clarence River

The Tweed River is a minor river located in the Marlborough district on the South Island of New Zealand.

It drains Lake McRae, Carters and Robinson Saddles on the south-western side of the Inland Kaikōura Range and feeds into the Waiau Toa / Clarence River. The Tweed River lies within the borders of Molesworth Station.
