= Saxton River =

Coordinates: 42°06′S 173°09′E

Location
- Country: New Zealand
- Region: Marlborough Region, South Island

Physical characteristics
- Source
  - location: Raglan Range
- Mouth
  - location: Confluence with Acheron River
- Length: 25 km (16 mi)

Basin features
- Progression: South
- River system: Waiau Toa / Clarence River system

The Saxton River is a river in the Marlborough Region of New Zealand's South Island. It flows south from its sources to the east of the Raglan Range, reaching the Acheron River 10 kilometres (6 mi) west of Molesworth Station, which is a high country cattle station and, at over 1,800 square kilometres (440,000 acres), New Zealand's largest farm.

== See also ==
- List of rivers of New Zealand
