= Teme River =

Coordinates: 41.701287°S 173.607783°E

Location
- Country: New Zealand

Physical characteristics
- Mouth
  - location: Avon River
- Length: 15 km (9.3 mi)

The Teme River is a river of the Marlborough Region of New Zealand's South Island. It flows north from its sources in rough hill country north of the Awatere River valley to reach the Avon River.

== See also ==
- List of rivers of New Zealand
