= Omaka River =

Coordinates: 41°31′S 173°58′E

Location
- Country: New Zealand

Physical characteristics
- Source
  - location: Mount Horrible
- Mouth
  - location: Opawa River
- Length: 36 km (22 mi)

The Omaka River is a river of the Marlborough Region of New Zealand's South Island. It flows north from the slopes of Mount Horrible 30 kilometres (19 mi) west of Seddon, reaching the Ōpaoa River at the eastern end of Renwick.

The New Zealand Ministry for Culture and Heritage gives the Māori translation for Ōmaka as "place of the stream".

== See also ==
- List of rivers of New Zealand
