= Yarra River (New Zealand) =

Yarra River Yarrow River

Location
- Country: New Zealand
- Region: Marlborough District

Physical characteristics
- Source: Boddington Range
  - coordinates: 42°12′36″S 173°0′22″E
- Mouth: Acheron River
  - coordinates: 42°14′13″S 173°03′50″E
- Length: 22 kilometres (14 mi)

Basin features
- Progression: Yarra River → Acheron River → Waiau Toa / Clarence River
- River system: Waiau Toa / Clarence River

Yarra River is a river in Marlborough District, New Zealand. The river lies completely within the boundary of Molesworth Station. The Yarra River is 22 kilometres (14 mi) long. It flows south from its source at Elder Hill in the Boddington Range before turning south east and then north east where it flows into the Acheron River.

== Name ==
The earliest reference to the name Yarra River was found in a field book from 1866-70. The river name was temporary was approved in 1955 as Yarrow River on the assumption that the river was named after Yarrow Water in Scotland. The New Zealand Geographic Board recognised the Yarra River name as the official name of the river in 1973, after it was found that Yarra River was the earlier name and had established local usage.

== See also ==
- List of rivers of New Zealand
