= Tapuae-o-Uenuku =

Mountain on South Island, New Zealand

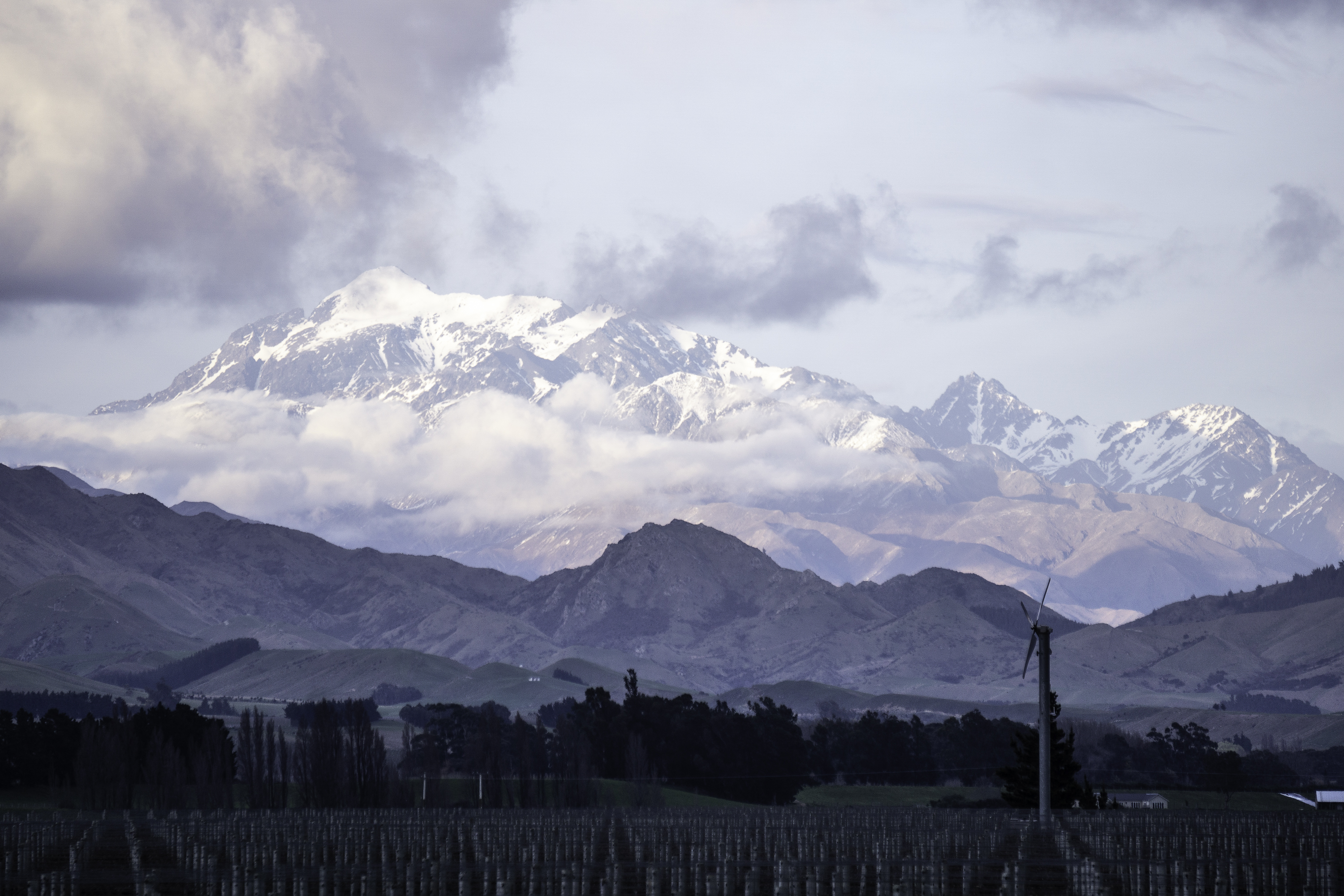
- Tapuae-o-Uenuku from the Awatere valley to the north east

Highest point
- Elevation: 2,885 m (9,465 ft)
- Prominence: 2,022 m (6,634 ft)
- Listing: Ultra; New Zealand #12
- Coordinates: 41°59′45″S 173°39′45″E

Geography
- Location within New Zealand
- Location: South Island, New Zealand
- Parent range: Kaikōura Ranges

Tapuae-o-Uenuku, formerly Mount Tapuaenuku, is the highest peak in the northeast of New Zealand's South Island. The name translates from Māori as "footprint of the rainbow", though is usually regarded as being named after Chief Tapuaenuku.

At 2,885 metres (9,465 ft) it is the highest mountain in New Zealand outside the main ranges of the Southern Alps, and over 80 metres taller than Mount Ruapehu, the tallest peak in the North Island. It had its beginnings as a magma chamber 3–4 km below the South Island's Torlesse rocks, which in turn had been buried by a 2 km geological layer over the last 100 million years. It has thus been uplifted almost 9 km over the last 4–5 million years, and without substantial erosion would be taller than the Himalayas.

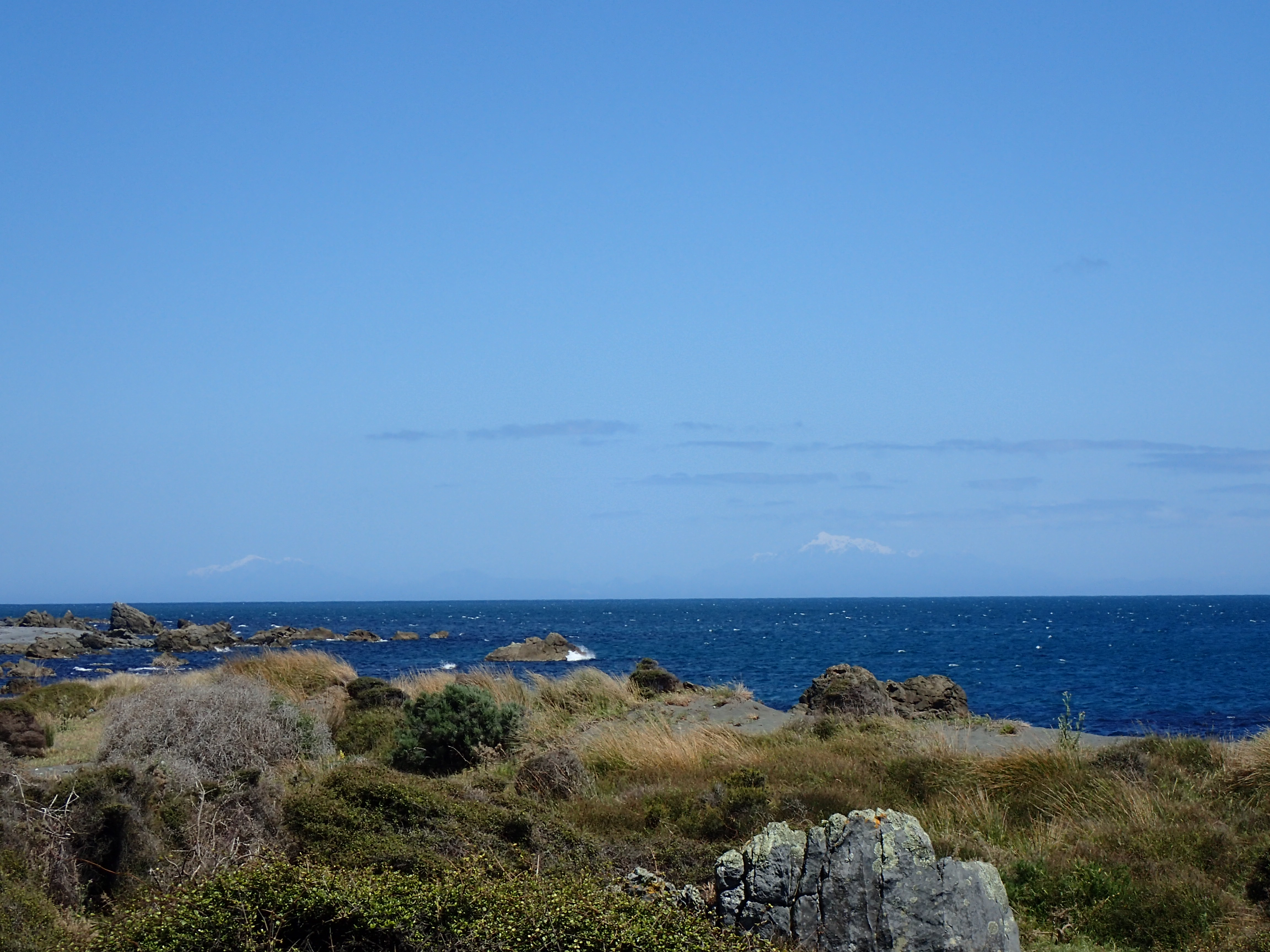
Tapuae-o-Uenuku (to right of center) 120 kilometers distant, as seen from Baring Head. The peak to the left is Manakau.

Tapuae-o-Uenuku dominates the Inland Kaikōura Range, rising high above the valleys of the Waiau Toa / Clarence and Awatere Rivers. It can be seen from as far away as Mount Ruapehu in the North Island, more than 340 km away, and is a prominent point on the horizon for travellers on the interisland ferries that ply Cook Strait.

The first European to sight the mountain was James Cook, who called it Mount Odin, but later nicknamed it "The Watcher" since his ship seemed to be visible from it at so many points along the coast. The first Europeans to attempt to climb the mountain were Edward John Eyre, Lieutenant-Governor of New Munster, and William John Warburton Hamilton, in 1849. They came within a short distance of the summit but were forced to turn back.

The mountain is locally known as "Tappy", it was the springboard for legendary mountaineer Sir Edmund Hillary's climbing career that took him to be the first person to reach the summit of Mount Everest.

"I'd climbed a decent mountain at last," Sir Ed said of his weekend solo climb in 1944, while training with the Royal New Zealand Air Force in Marlborough during WW2.

== See also ==
- Uenuku
- List of mountains of New Zealand by height
