= Whatamangō Bay =

Bay in Marlborough Sounds, New Zealand

- Location within Marlborough Sounds
- Location: Queen Charlotte Sound / Tōtaranui, Marlborough Sounds
- Coordinates: 41.2589°S 174.0775°E

Whatamangō Bay, at centre, extends off Queen Charlotte Sound, at the north, between Karaka Point and Motueka Bay

Whatamangō Bay is a large bay in Queen Charlotte Sound, New Zealand, near Picton. It is accessible by road, with the back of the bay containing a campsite and a number of properties. Whatamangō meets Waikawa Bay at Karaka Point, and is home to the exit of the Graham River.

== Naming ==
Whatamangō is made up of two Māori words, whata, meaning 'elevated stage' or 'storage place', and mangō, a name for dogfish and sharks. Together they mean "an elevated stage for storing dogfish/sharks".

Peter Fannin's chart from James Cook's second expedition gives the name Beautifull Bay to either Whatamangō Bay or Waikawa Bay.

== Ahuriri Bay ==
Ahuriri Bay sits at the back of Whatamangō Bay.

Ahuriri is a Māori word meaning 'trench' or 'dyke', or a 'low fence in a cultivation or pā entrance'. The name can also be split into the syllables ahu, meaning "to tend/foster/nurture" or "to heap up", and riri, meaning "to be angry", or "fight/battle". The name could therefore mean "to heap up anger", "to foster battle", or "to foster anger".

== Karaka Point ==
Karaka Point sits between Whatamangō Bay and Waikawa Bay.

A substantial pā was built along Karaka Point by early Kāti Māmoe residents, and succeeding iwi took possession peacefully or otherwise. Eventually iwi from Te Ika a Māui began movements and raids on Te Waipounamu. In the summer of 1829–30, Te Ātiawa swept into Queen Charlotte Sound, attacking those in East Bay and Endeavour Inlet. Large numbers of Rangitāne and some Ngāti Apa retreated to the Te Rae o Karaka pā, thinking it impregnable due to its sheer cliff-face. Tuiti Makitānara described insults being thrown between the attackers and defenders, whilst a group landed and took up offensive positions in the mānuka behind the pā. Once positioned, the rest of the attackers drew in and began picking off defending chiefs and warriors using their muskets. These deaths caused panic amongst the defenders, and a large group attempted to escape the pā through its back gate, but were ambushed and annihilated by the group in the mānuka. For some years after the fact, the deserted headland was cleared and used for farming. In the 20th century, the land was gifted to the nation and became a scenic and historic reserve in August 1953. Today, Rangitāne has erected a beautiful pou on the site representing the story of Kupe's battle with the giant wheke, and interpretive boards can be found describing the visible landscape features. Today a pathway leads up the once impregnable cliff-face.

== Tuna Point ==
Tuna Point is located on the eastern coast of Whatamangō Bay, near its centre.

== Motueka Bay ==
Motueka Bay is a bay just outside of Whatamangō Bay. Motueka is a contraction of motu, meaning "land", "clump of trees", or anything separated or isolated, and weka, a native bird. The Western Weka or Gallirallus australis Australias, is found throughout the Marlborough Sounds. The name of the bay can therefore be taken to mean the "grove of the weka" or the "land of the weka".
