= Blairich River =

Coordinates: 41°42′S 173°56′E

Location
- Country: New Zealand

Physical characteristics
- Mouth
  - location: Awatere River
  - elevation: about 130 m (430 ft)

The Blairich River is a river in the Marlborough district of New Zealand. It is a tributary of the Awatere River

== See also ==
- List of rivers of New Zealand
