= Leatham River =

Coordinates: 41.887°S 173.152°E

Location
- Country: New Zealand

Physical characteristics
- Source
  - location: Raglan Range
- Mouth
  - location: Branch River
- Length: 40 km (25 mi)

The Leatham River is a river of the Marlborough Region of New Zealand's South Island. It is the main tributary of the Branch River, itself a tributary of the Wairau River. The Leatham flows north in a parallel valley to the Branch for most of its length before turning northwest to join with the Branch 6 kilometres (4 mi) from its outflow into the Wairau 40 kilometres (25 mi) south of Richmond, New Zealand.

The Leatham River was named after George Leatham, an agriculture laborer who did tree felling and other timber work in the area during the 1800s. He died in Wellington at the age of 59 in 1894. He is buried in the Karori Cemetery Much of the Leatham Region was part of the Birch Hill Station, an early Wairau Sheep station, once owned by Dr Thomas Renwick, member of the New Zealand Legislative Council.

== See also ==
- List of rivers of New Zealand
