= Constantine Dillon =

New Zealand settler (1813–1853)

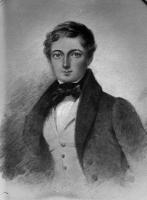
Constantine Dillon, Nelson Provincial Museum

Constantine Augustus Dillon (14 September 1813 – 16 April 1853) was an officer in the Royal Navy, the 16th Lancers, and the 7th Dragoon Guards, a prominent settler of New Zealand, and the fourth son of Henry Dillon, 13th Viscount Dillon.

== Biography ==
Constantine Augustus was born in 1813 to the 13th Viscount Dillon and his wife Henrietta, daughter of Colonel Dominick Browne, Governor of the County of Mayo. Through his father he was a descendant of both Charles II of England (by his mistress Barbara Palmer), and James II of England (by his mistress Catherine Sedley). Dillon had many notable female relations including Clementine Churchill, the Mitford sisters, and Rosalind Howard, Countess of Carlisle known as The Radical Countess.

Dillon served as aide-de-camp to Lord Durham during his office in Canada, and also served Viscount Ebrington while he was Lord Lieutenant of Ireland.

In 1842 Dillon married Fanny Dorothea Story, the daughter of Philip Laycock Story and his wife Lydia, the daughter of merchant banker Sir Francis Baring, 1st Baronet. The couple sailed to New Zealand on the George Fyfe, arriving in Nelson on 12 December 1842. On arrival to New Zealand Dillon gained substantial holdings in the Waihopai Valley, known as Leefield, and became a local magistrate.

In 1848 Dillon was appointed civil and military secretary to Governor George Grey resulting in a brief relocation to Auckland. In 1850 he returned to Nelson and was appointed Commissioner of Crown Lands. In 1851 Dillon was appointed a member of the General Legislative Council.

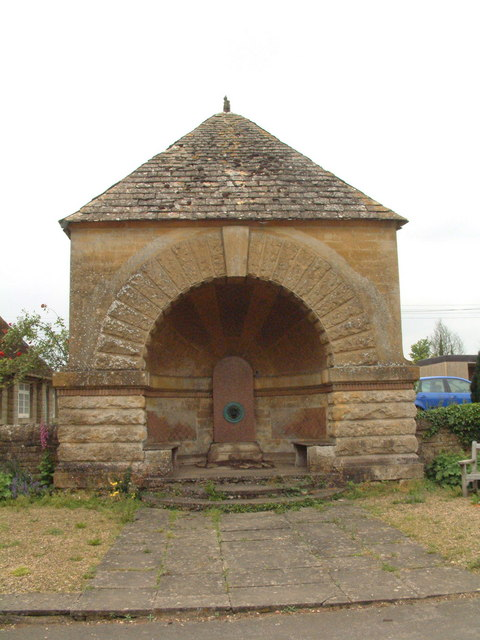
Memorial to Dillon, Spelsbury, Oxfordshire

On 16 April 1853, Dillon drowned in the Wairau River while returning to Nelson with his son from Leefield. He was buried in the churchyard of St Michael's Church in Waimea West. As a result, the family returned to Oxfordshire indefinitely until his eldest surviving son Philip returned to New Zealand to take up the family's 32,000 acres (13,000 ha) Leefield estate.

The Dillon River in New Zealand's Marlborough Region is named after him.
