= Castle River (Marlborough) =

Location
- Country: New Zealand

Physical characteristics
- Source
  - elevation: 1,530 metres (5,020 ft)
- Mouth
  - location: Awatere River
  - coordinates: 41.98°S 173.45°E
  - elevation: 685 metres (2,247 ft)
- Length: 16 km (9.9 mi)

The Castle River in the Marlborough Region of New Zealand rises just north of Shingle Peak. It flows east from its source and then south until it meets the Awatere River.
