= Ōhinemahuta River =

Coordinates: 41°29′S 173°46′E

Location
- Country: New Zealand

Physical characteristics
- Mouth
  - location: Wairau River
- Length: 14 km (9 mi)

The Ōhinemahuta River, formerly known as the Onamalutu River, is a river of the Marlborough Region of New Zealand's South Island. It initially flows northeast, turning southeast to reach the Wairau River 5 kilometres (3 mi) northwest of Renwick.

In August 2014, the name of the river was officially altered to Ōhinemahuta River. The former name of the river, Onamalutu, was a corruption of Ōhinemahuta, which refers to the place where the Rangitāne/Ngāti Mamoe ancestor Hine Mahuta once lived.

== See also ==
- List of rivers of New Zealand
