= Waihopai River (Marlborough) =

- Native name: Waihopai (Māori)

Location
- Country: New Zealand
- Region: Marlborough

Physical characteristics
- Source: Waihopai Saddle
  - coordinates: 41°54′25″S 173°12′47″E
- Mouth: Wairau River
  - coordinates: 41°30′39″S 173°43′34″E

Basin features
- River system: Wairau River
- Tributaries
  - right: Spray River, Avon River

The Waihopai River—the more northerly of two New Zealand rivers of that name—runs through the South Island's Marlborough Region and is a major tributary of the Wairau River. The river has its source in the Raglan Range of mountains, some 70 kilometres (43 mi) northwest of Kaikōura. It runs in a generally northeastward direction for all of its length, the first section of which is through narrow alpine valleys. After joining its major tributary, the Spray River, the valley begins to widen, becoming a broad valley by the time it accepts its second main tributary, the Avon River. For the last 15 kilometres (9 mi) of its length the Waihopai turns northward, reaching the Wairau 7 kilometres (4 mi) west of Renwick.
