= Tunakino River =

Coordinates: 41°13′S 173°37′E

Location
- Country: New Zealand

Physical characteristics
- Mouth
  - location: Opouri River
- Length: 10 km (6.2 mi)

The Tunakino River is a river of the Marlborough Region of New Zealand's South Island. It flows south from its origins in a coastal rim of hills at the base of the Marlborough Sounds to reach the Opouri River 5 kilometres (3 mi) east of Rai Valley.

== See also ==
- List of rivers of New Zealand
