= Guide River =

Coordinates: 42°15′47″S 173°04′43″E

Location
- Country: New Zealand

Physical characteristics
- Source
  - location: Marlborough Region
- Mouth
  - location: Acheron River

The Guide River is a river in the Marlborough Region of New Zealand (Note: Not to be confused with Guide River in Tasmania.) It starts near Barefell Pass on the eastern side of the Rachel Range and flows south-east to join the Acheron River, which joins the Waiau Toa / Clarence River and eventually drains into the Pacific Ocean.

The river was named by Sir Frederick Weld and his station manager in 1850, because it guided them from the Barefell Pass to the Acheron River (which they misidentified as the Clarence River).

== See also ==
- List of rivers of New Zealand
