= Wye River (New Zealand) =

River in Marlborough Region, New Zealand

Location
- Country: New Zealand
- Region: Marlborough District

Physical characteristics
- Source
  - coordinates: 41°45′29″S 173°16′48″E
- Mouth: Wairau River
  - coordinates: 41°37′16″S 173°29′52″E
- Length: 23 kilometres (14 mi)

Basin features
- River system: Wairau River

Wye River is a minor river in the northeast of the South Island of New Zealand. It feeds into the Wairau River.

A single lane Truss Bridge carries traffic on State Highway 63 over the river.

== Name ==
The river was at one time known as the Little Wai to distinguish it from the Waihopai River. The form Wye may be a mistaken transcription of Wai, or named independently after the River Wye in Wales. The New Zealand Geographic Board recognised Wye River name as the official name of the river in 2021
