= Acheron River (Marlborough) =

River in Marlborough Region, New Zealand

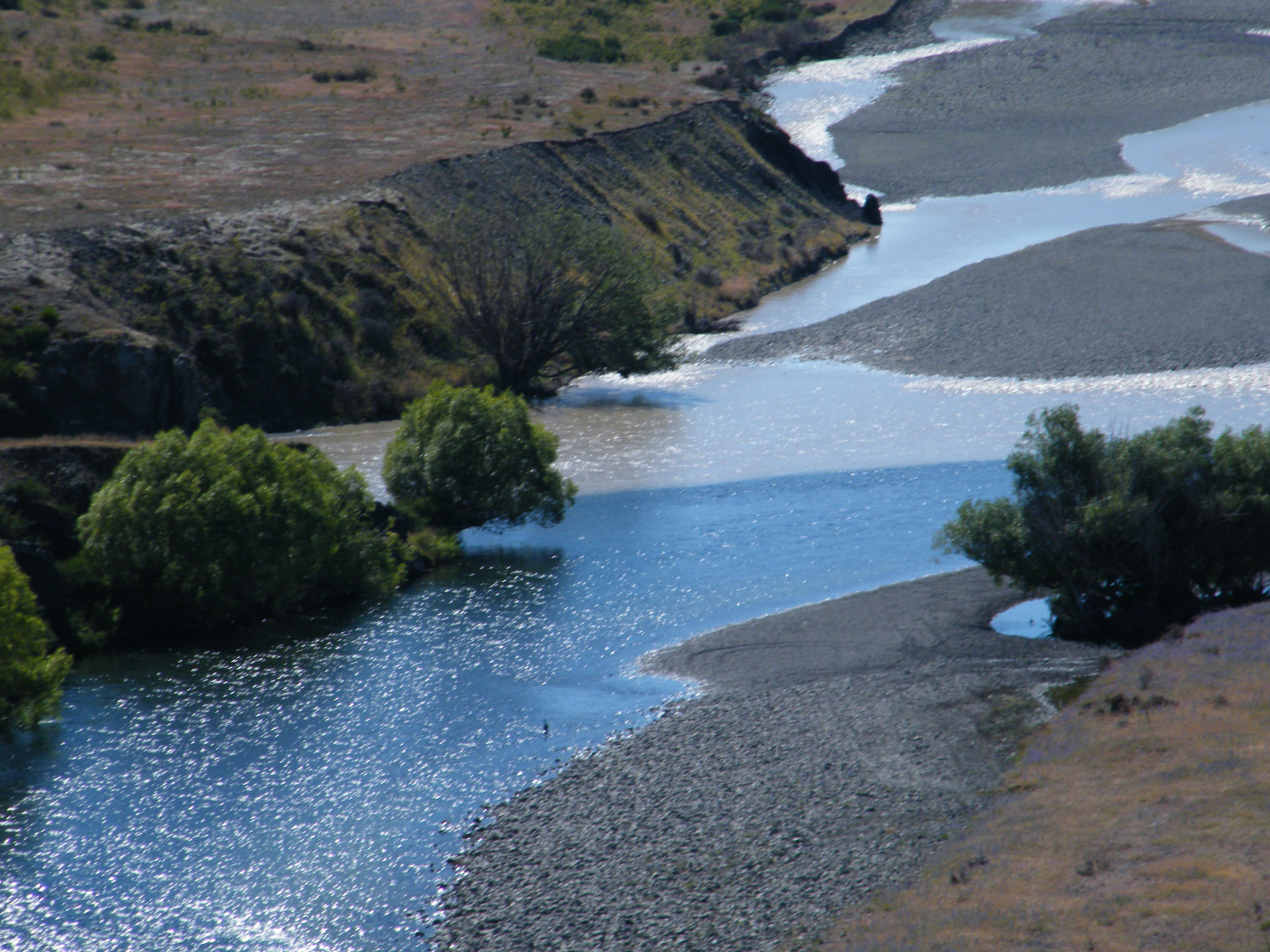
- Acheron River flowing through Molesworth Station
- Route of the Acheron River
- Mouth of the Acheron River Acheron River (Marlborough) (South Island)

Location
- Country: New Zealand
- region: Marlborough

Physical characteristics
- Source: Blue Mountain
  - coordinates: 41°54′42″S 173°19′27″E
  - elevation: 1,800 m (5,900 ft)
- Mouth: Waiau Toa / Clarence River
  - coordinates: 42°23′35″S 172°58′7″E
  - elevation: 690 m (2,260 ft)
- Length: 76 kilometres (47 mi)

Basin features
- Progression: Acheron River → Waiau Toa / Clarence River
- River system: Waiau Toa / Clarence River system
- Tributaries
  - left: Guide River
  - right: Saxton River, Severn River, Yarra River

The Acheron River is a river in the South Island of New Zealand, in Marlborough and flows into the Waiau Toa / Clarence River. It flows southwest and then east for a total of 76 kilometres (47 mi), joining the Waiau Toa / Clarence at the southern end of the Inland Kaikōura mountains. The Alma and Severn Rivers flow into the Acheron before it joins the Waiau Toa / Clarence.

== See also ==
- List of rivers of New Zealand
- Acheron River (Canterbury)
- Acheron (river in Greece)
