= Waikākaho River =

Coordinates: 41°27′S 173°54′E

Location
- Country: New Zealand

Physical characteristics
- Mouth
  - location: Wairau River
- Length: 14 km (9 mi)

The Waikākaho River is a river of the Marlborough Region of New Zealand's South Island. It flows south from its sources southeast of Havelock to reach the Wairau River 5 kilometres (3 mi) west of Tuamarina.

The New Zealand Ministry for Culture and Heritage gives a translation of "waters of the flowering plumes of the toetoe" for Waikākaho.

== See also ==
- List of rivers of New Zealand
