= Temes =

Temes may refer to several places:

- Temes County, or County of Temes, former county of the Kingdom of Hungary
- Temes (region), in Hungarian language: Temesköz; old name for the territory of Banat.
- Timiș (river), or in Hungarian language: Temes. Now in Romania and Serbia.
- Banate of Temes, alternative name for Banat of Temeswar
- Temes or Techno-memes
