= Tummil River =

Coordinates: 41°40′S 173°39′E

Location
- Country: New Zealand

Physical characteristics
- Mouth
  - location: Avon River
- Length: 12 km (7.5 mi)

The Tummil River is a river of the Marlborough Region of New Zealand's South Island. It flows northwest from rough hill country north of Mount Horrible to reach the Avon River southwest of Blenheim.

== See also ==
- List of rivers of New Zealand
