= Alma River (New Zealand) =

Coordinates: 42°08′S 173°03′E

- Location of mouth

Location
- Country: New Zealand
- Location: Marlborough Region, South Island

Physical characteristics
- Mouth
  - location: Confluence with Severn River

Basin features
- Progression: Northeast
- River system: Waiau Toa / Clarence River system

The Alma River is in Marlborough, New Zealand. It flows through rugged inland terrain before meeting the Severn River shortly before the Severn flows into the Acheron River.
