= Graham River =

Coordinates: 41°16′32″S 174°04′28″E

Location
- Country: New Zealand

Physical characteristics
- Source
  - location: Marlborough
- Mouth
  - location: Whatamangō Bay, Queen Charlotte Sound / Tōtaranui

The Graham River is a river in the Marlborough Region of New Zealand. It rises to the south-east of Mount McCormick and flows north, then west, then north again, and into Whatamangō Bay on the south side of Queen Charlotte Sound.

Part of the river valley was subdivided into residential sections in the 1950s. Some of the sections were built on in 2000. Because flooding occurred in the area in November 1994 and July 1998, and to a lesser extent in May 1995, the Marlborough District Council required minimum floor levels and imposed a disclaimer notice on residents.

Unexpected very heavy rain caused a flash flood on the Graham River on 17 February 2004. The rain also caused floods at Waikawa and Picton. Residential land was covered by deep and fast-flowing water. This was estimated to be a once-in-200-years event. Another flood occurred in 2005. The council agreed to remove gravel from the upper reaches of the river, because the gravel had been loosened and swept downriver from the catchment due to the flooding and would reduce the river channel capacity.

== See also ==
- List of rivers of New Zealand
