= Severn River (New Zealand) =

River in New Zealand

Coordinates: 41°17′S 173°31′E

Location
- Country: New Zealand
- Region: Marlborough Region, South Island

Physical characteristics
- Source
  - location: Raglan Range
- Mouth
  - location: Confluence with Acheron River

Basin features
- Progression: South-southeast
- River system: Waiau Toa / Clarence River system
- Tributaries
  - right: Alma River

The Severn River is in the South Island of New Zealand. The headwaters of the river are in the Raglan Range and it flows into the Acheron River. One of its tributaries is the Alma River.
