= Blind (Otūwhero) River =

Coordinates: 41°39′32″S 174°9′20″E

Location
- Country: New Zealand

The Blind (Otūwhero) River is a small river in the Marlborough district on the South Island of New Zealand. It flows into Clifford Bay 4 kilometres (2.5 mi) north of Lake Grassmere. A small settlement named Blind River is located on its south bank.

== See also ==
- List of rivers of New Zealand
