= Branch River (Wairau River tributary) =

Coordinates: 41.8568°S 173.0953°E

Location
- Country: New Zealand

Physical characteristics
- Mouth
  - location: Wairau River

The Branch River is a river in the Marlborough Region of New Zealand's South Island. It is a tributary of the Wairau River, flowing north for 30 kilometres (19 mi) to meet the Wairau 65 kilometres (40 mi) west of the town of Blenheim. Just before flowing into the Wairau, the Branch River crosses underneath State Highway 63.

In 1978 a power station was considered for the Branch River and was commissioned in 1983, being completed in 1984. It is Marlborough Region's largest source of electricity generation.

== See also ==
- List of rivers of New Zealand
