= Avon River (Marlborough) =

Coordinates: 41.633240°S 173.665896°E

Location
- Country: New Zealand

Physical characteristics
- Mouth
  - location: Waihopai River
- Length: 20 km (12 mi)

The Avon River flows northeast from its sources in rough country southwest of Blenheim to reach the Waihopai River 20 kilometres (12 mi) from the latter's outflow into the Wairau River of New Zealand. Tummil River is a tributary of the Avon, joining it southwest of Blenheim.

== See also ==
- Avon River (Canterbury), a river of the same name in Christchurch
