= Mount Horrible =

Mountain in Washington (state), United States

Coordinates: 46°05′59″N 117°26′54″W

Mount Horrible is a summit of the Blue Mountains in Asotin County, Washington, in the United States. With an elevation of 5,804 feet (1,769 m), Mount Horrible is the 906th highest summit in the state of Washington. Along with neighboring Mount Misery, it was named by 19th century pioneers for the difficult conditions they experienced on the Grouse Flat.
