= Lake Grassmere =

Lake Grassmere / Kapara Te Hau
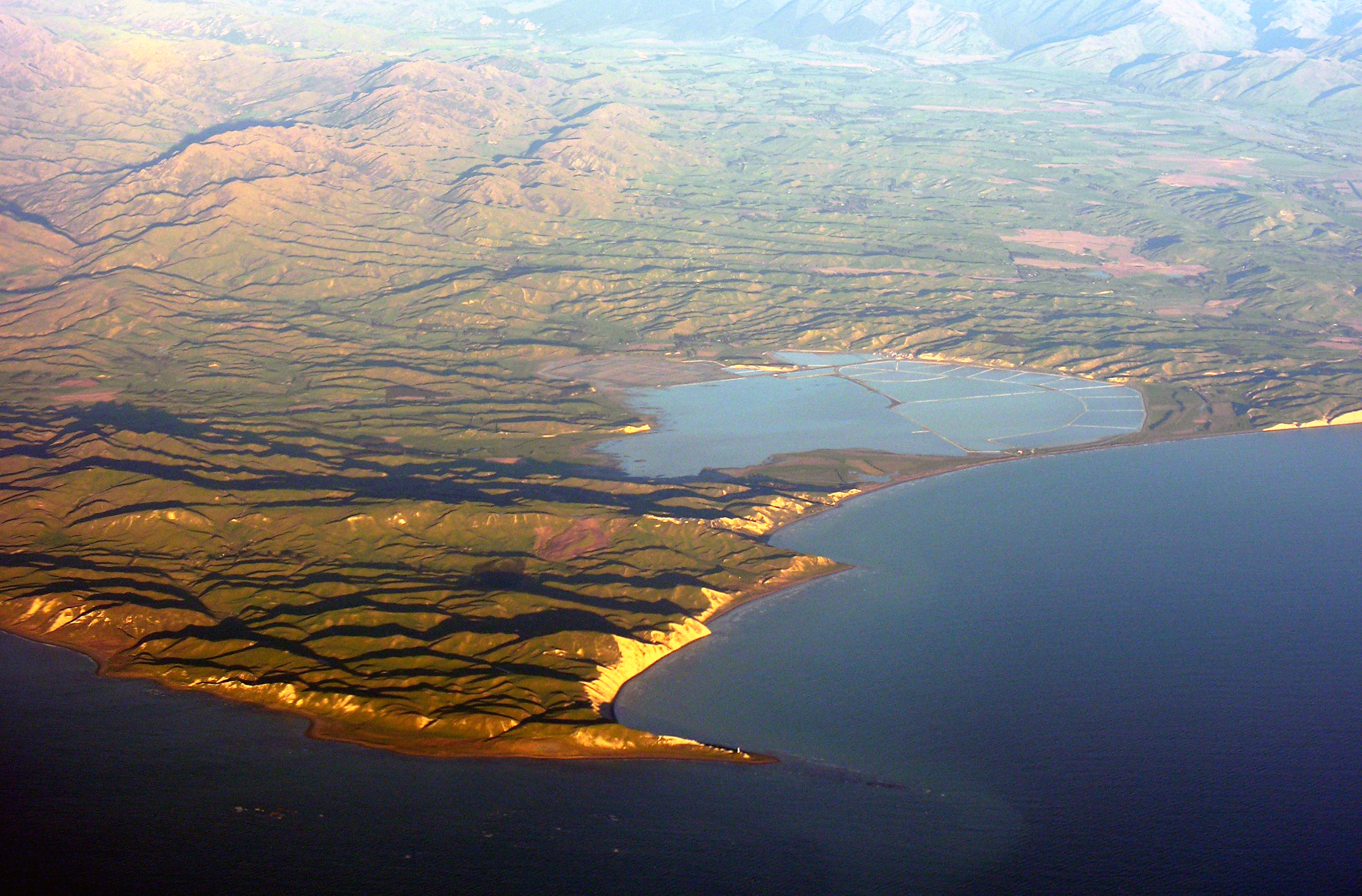
- Lake Grassmere

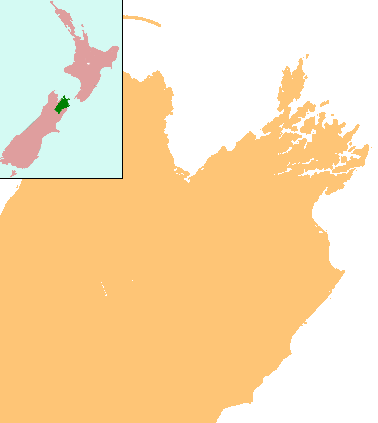
- Location within New Zealand Marlborough
- Interactive map of Lake Grassmere / Kapara Te Hau
- Location: Marlborough Region, South Island
- Coordinates: 41°44′S 174°10′E
- Type: lagoon
- Primary inflows: none
- Basin countries: New Zealand
- Surface area: 17 km^{2} (6.6 mi^{2})

Lake Grassmere / Kapara Te Hau is a New Zealand waituna-type lagoon in the northeastern South Island, close to Cook Strait. The lake is used for the production of salt.

== Geography ==
Lake Grassmere, 25 miles (40 km) south of Blenheim and 6 miles (10 km) south of the mouth of the Awatere River, is a shallow lagoon protected from the open sea by a single barrier beach covered by sand dunes. It is on the north-easterly extension of the Ward depression.

Covering an area of 17 square kilometres (6.6 mi^{2}), it has no natural inflow and is prone to strong warm winds. Close to the sea, it also has very high salinity.

Because of these geographical characteristics, it is ideal for natural salt extraction. Grassmere has been divided into solar evaporation ponds. Seawater is pumped in, and moved between ponds over several months, increasing in salinity with each evaporation period. As salinity increases, crystallised salt forms and is extracted. These crystals give the lake a distinctive pink colour.

Grassmere's area varies between 3,500 and 4,400 acres (14 and 18 km^{2}); this maximum is attained only in rare floods. The watershed is small. The climate, with a low average rainfall of 585 millimetres (23.0 in) and prevailing strong and dry north-westerly winds, provides Lake Grassmere with the suitable conditions required for natural economic salt production.

=== Climate ===
Climate data for Grassmere Salt Works (1991–2020)
Month	Jan	Feb	Mar	Apr	May	Jun	Jul	Aug	Sep	Oct	Nov	Dec	Year
Mean daily maximum °C (°F)	22.4 (72.3)	22.0 (71.6)	20.7 (69.3)	18.0 (64.4)	15.9 (60.6)	13.4 (56.1)	12.7 (54.9)	13.7 (56.7)	15.6 (60.1)	17.5 (63.5)	19.2 (66.6)	21.0 (69.8)	17.7 (63.8)
Daily mean °C (°F)	18.5 (65.3)	18.2 (64.8)	16.7 (62.1)	14.1 (57.4)	11.9 (53.4)	9.4 (48.9)	8.8 (47.8)	9.9 (49.8)	11.8 (53.2)	13.5 (56.3)	15.3 (59.5)	17.2 (63.0)	13.8 (56.8)
Mean daily minimum °C (°F)	14.6 (58.3)	14.4 (57.9)	12.8 (55.0)	10.2 (50.4)	7.8 (46.0)	5.3 (41.5)	4.9 (40.8)	6.0 (42.8)	8.0 (46.4)	9.6 (49.3)	11.4 (52.5)	13.4 (56.1)	9.9 (49.8)
Average rainfall mm (inches)	36 (1.4)	37.4 (1.47)	38.3 (1.51)	46.3 (1.82)	47.3 (1.86)	69.3 (2.73)	60.4 (2.38)	52.0 (2.05)	45.7 (1.80)	39.9 (1.57)	46.7 (1.84)	42.6 (1.68)	561.9 (22.11)
Source: NIWA

== Early history ==
The Māori name for the lake is Kapara Te Hau ("wind-blown lake"). Early whalers on the coast rendered this name “Cobblers' Hole”.

According to Māori oral tradition, the lake occupies the site of early cultivations. Kupe, the navigator, is said to have poured salt water on these cultivations, thus creating the lake.

In pre-European times it was used as a ready source of food, as it attracts a wide range of waterfowl.

In 1832–33, a year after Ngāti Toa under the leadership of Te Rauparaha had defeated Ngāi Tahu at Kaiapoi and Banks Peninsula, Ngāti Toa visited the lake to take moulting ducks. A Ngāi Tahu force, having learned of this impending visit, laid an ambush. Scouts from Te Rauparaha's party found the locality apparently uninhabited and the canoes were driven ashore. On landing, the visitors were taken by surprise and sustained heavy casualties. Te Rauparaha was seized by Tūhawaiki, who was anxious to take him alive. The captive, however, after feigning resignation, was less tightly held. He then slipped out of his flax garment, swam to a canoe and made his escape.

== Salt industry ==
Until the 1940s, Grassmere's bed was a mud bath in winter and a dustbowl in summer, with the occasional natural deposit of salt.

The salt industry began in 1943 and now occupies one-third of the suitable lake area of 15 square kilometres (3,800 acres). The 1960 production was 17,000 tons whereas the total consumption of industrial and domestic salt in New Zealand in 1960 was about 61,000 tons. Maximum expansion could produce 50,000 tons, and many economic by-products can be developed; caustic soda and gypsum are already produced in small quantities. In 2005, Lake Grassmere provided about half of New Zealand's domestic salt requirements.

In addition to low rainfall, Grassmere is perfectly suited to solar salt production. The large area of flat land that makes up the lake bed is near the sea so it can draw in salt water, and away from large rivers. High evaporation from sun and wind occurs during summer, and the site has ready access to both sea and rail transport.

In the mid 1960s, harvests were carried out with a new pattern of crystallising ponds which have special provision for draining off rainwater before it has had time to mix with the brine concentrate.

The harvest for 1964–65 reached 30,000 tons, a record at the time.

By 1970, the harvest had increased to almost 52,000 tonnes, but this could not match demand, which had grown with industrial development (especially from freezing works and pulp and paper mills). It became evident that Grassmere could not meet New Zealand's salt requirements.

Bulk shipments of salt from the Caribbean and Australia were landed at Mt Maunganui, where a vacuum salt plant was built. This produced the high-purity salt needed by producers in the dairy and pharmaceutical industries. A second, smaller vacuum plant was built at Grassmere.

Some rolling stock from the railway at Grassmere salt works is preserved at the Ferrymead Two Foot Railway.

== Economics ==
A large range of salts with slightly different chemical compositions, grain sizes and shapes are produced at Lake Grassmere. All table salt produced in New Zealand is solar salt, and both iodised and non-iodised table salt are available.

Iodised salt contains added iodine (to prevent goitre) and silicon dioxide (to make the salt run). Specialty salts, including flaky salt, are also produced at Lake Grassmere.

Animal health products such as salt licks for farm animals are produced at Grassmere and Mount Maunganui.

At the end of summer Grassmere's gleaming white salt piles are easily seen from State Highway 1. This seasonal landmark forms a vivid contrast to the burnt brown of the Marlborough hills.

== Seismic activity ==
A fault running underneath Lake Grassmere triggered a magnitude 6.6 earthquake on 16 August 2013. The quake was 8 kilometres (5 mi) deep and was strike-slip fault similar to the 2013 Seddon earthquake on 21 July, thus considered a doublet earthquake.

== Official name ==
The official name of the lake become a dual name as a result of the Ngāi Tahu Claims Settlement Act 1998.
