= Opouri River =

Coordinates: 41°13′S 173°36′E

Location
- Country: New Zealand

Physical characteristics
- Mouth
  - location: Rai River
- Length: 15 km (9.3 mi)

The Opouri River is a river of the Marlborough Region of New Zealand's South Island. It flows generally west from its sources in the Bull Range, a coastal ridge overlooking the Marlborough Sounds, joining with the Rai River 15 kilometres (9 mi) west of Havelock.

The New Zealand Ministry for Culture and Heritage offers translation of the river's name in Māori as a "place of sadness".

== See also ==
- List of rivers of New Zealand
