= Seddon, New Zealand =

Town in Marlborough, New Zealand

Seddon
- Town
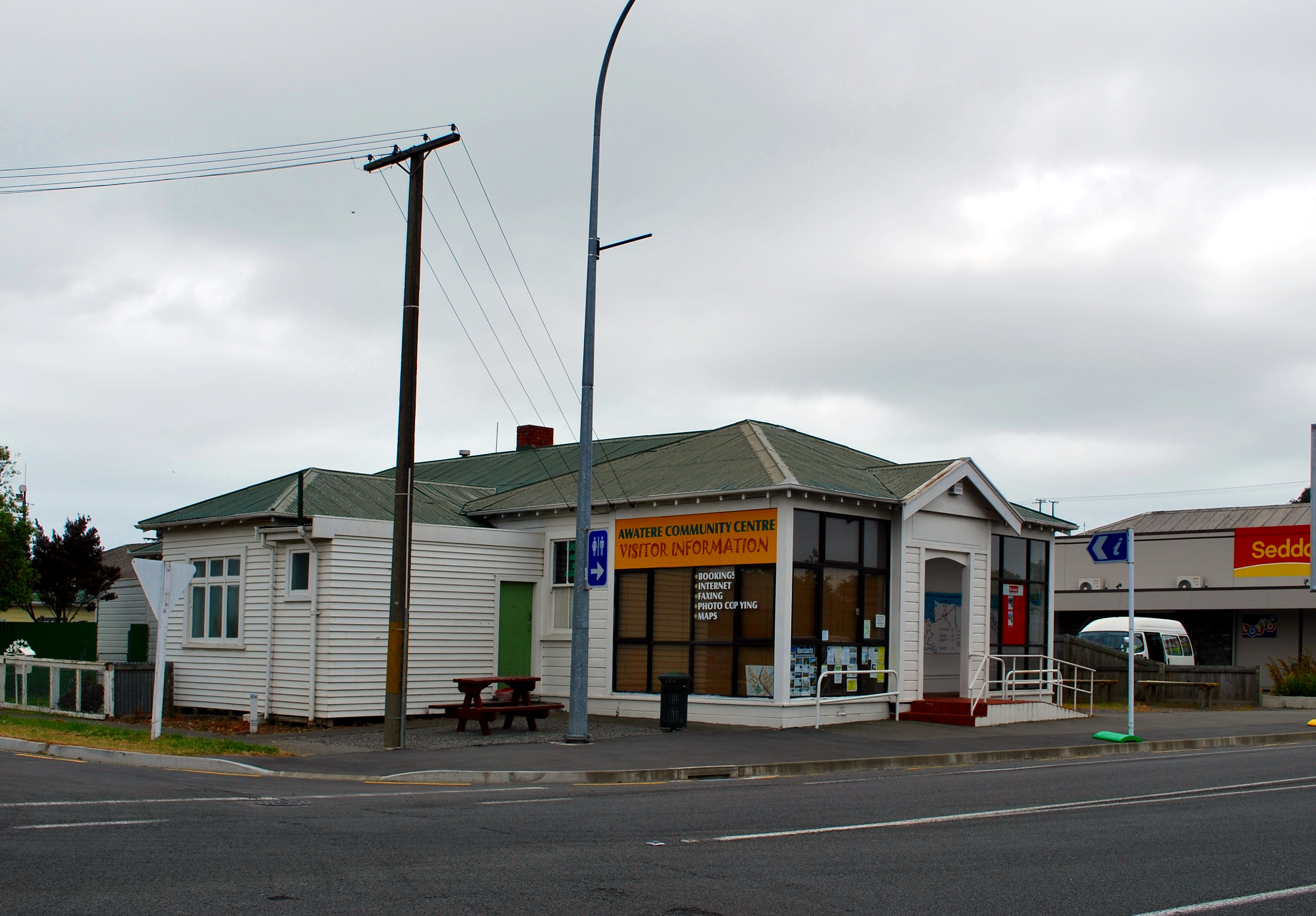
- Awatere Community Centre
- Interactive map of Seddon
- Coordinates: 41°40′12″S 174°4′25″E
- Country: New Zealand
- Region: Marlborough
- Ward: Wairau-Awatere General Ward; Marlborough Māori Ward
- Electorates: Kaikōura; Te Tai Tonga (Māori)

Government
  - Territorial Authority: Marlborough District Council
  - Marlborough District Mayor: Nadine Taylor
  - Kaikōura MP: Stuart Smith
  - Te Tai Tonga MP: Tākuta Ferris

Area
  - Total: 1.66 km^{2} (0.64 sq mi)

Population (June 2025)
  - Total: 570
  - Density: 340/km^{2} (890/sq mi)
- Time zone: UTC+12 (New Zealand Standard Time)
  - Summer (DST): UTC+13 (New Zealand Daylight Time)
- Postcode: 7210

Seddon is a small town in Marlborough, New Zealand. It is located 25 kilometres (16 mi) south of Blenheim, close to the mouths of the Awatere and Blind Rivers and the Lake Grassmere salt works.

Salt and lime are major local industries, and the Awatere Valley is an important part of the Marlborough wine region.

The town was named for a former Prime Minister of New Zealand, Richard Seddon.

== Geography ==
=== Earthquakes ===
Seddon has been close to the epicentres of several significant earthquakes.

On the morning of 16 October 1848, Marlborough was struck by a damaging earthquake later estimated to be between magnitude 7.4 and 7.7. The epicentre of this earthquake was 45 km southeast of Seddon.

On 23 April 1966, a magnitude 5.8 earthquake with an epicentre in Cook Strait, 40 km east of Seddon was most strongly felt in the town, damaging the chimney on almost every house in town.

In July and August 2013 Seddon was the closest settlement to the epicentres of a doublet earthquake event. First, in late July, a series of sizeable earthquakes struck the region over a period of a few days being felt strongly in Blenheim, Wellington and the rest of Central New Zealand, the strongest being a magnitude 6.5 and having its epicentre in Cook Strait. Then on 16 August 2013 a magnitude 6.6 earthquake with its epicentre under Lake Grassmere struck about 2:30 PM and was followed by a series of aftershocks over the next few hours, one of which was above magnitude 6 and several others above magnitude 5. This came just a few years after devastating earthquakes affected Christchurch, 285 km away.

== Demographics ==
Seddon is described by Stats NZ as a rural settlement. It covers 1.66 km^{2} (0.64 sq mi) and had an estimated population of 570 as of June 2025, with a population density of 343 people per km^{2}. It is part of the wider Awatere statistical area.

Historical population
Year	Pop.	±% p.a.
2006	495	—
2013	489	−0.17%
2018	552	+2.45%
2023	561	+0.32%

Seddon had a population of 561 in the 2023 New Zealand census, an increase of 9 people (1.6%) since the 2018 census, and an increase of 72 people (14.7%) since the 2013 census. There were 291 males, 261 females, and 6 people of other genders in 225 dwellings. 3.2% of people identified as LGBTIQ+. The median age was 41.5 years (compared with 38.1 years nationally). There were 99 people (17.6%) aged under 15 years, 84 (15.0%) aged 15 to 29, 294 (52.4%) aged 30 to 64, and 81 (14.4%) aged 65 or older.

People could identify as more than one ethnicity. The results were 84.0% European (Pākehā); 23.5% Māori; 3.7% Pasifika; 2.1% Asian; 0.5% Middle Eastern, Latin American and African New Zealanders (MELAA); and 2.1% other, which includes people giving their ethnicity as "New Zealander". English was spoken by 97.3%, Māori by 4.3%, and other languages by 6.4%. No language could be spoken by 1.6% (e.g. too young to talk). New Zealand Sign Language was known by 1.1%. The percentage of people born overseas was 15.5, compared with 28.8% nationally.

Religious affiliations were 21.9% Christian, 0.5% Islam, 0.5% Māori religious beliefs, and 2.1% other religions. People who answered that they had no religion were 64.7%, and 10.2% of people did not answer the census question.

Of those at least 15 years old, 30 (6.5%) people had a bachelor's or higher degree, 252 (54.5%) had a post-high school certificate or diploma, and 174 (37.7%) people exclusively held high school qualifications. The median income was $40,700, compared with $41,500 nationally. 18 people (3.9%) earned over $100,000 compared to 12.1% nationally. The employment status of those at least 15 was 249 (53.9%) full-time, 66 (14.3%) part-time, and 9 (1.9%) unemployed.

== Transport ==
State Highway 1 passes through Seddon on its route between Blenheim and Christchurch.

The Marlborough section of the Main North Line railway reached Seddon from Blenheim in October 1902. This also saw the construction of a combined road-rail bridge over the Awatere River north of the town, with the single-lane road below the rail. The bridge remained in service for road traffic until October 2007, when a new two-lane road bridge opened. Seddon was the southern terminus of the railway until the line was extended to Ward in April 1911; the full line through to Christchurch didn't open until December 1945. Today, Seddon is served by the Coastal Pacific train, which runs once daily each way during the summer months.

A train derailment at Blind River, south of Seddon, on 25 February 1948, killed six people and injured 40 others.

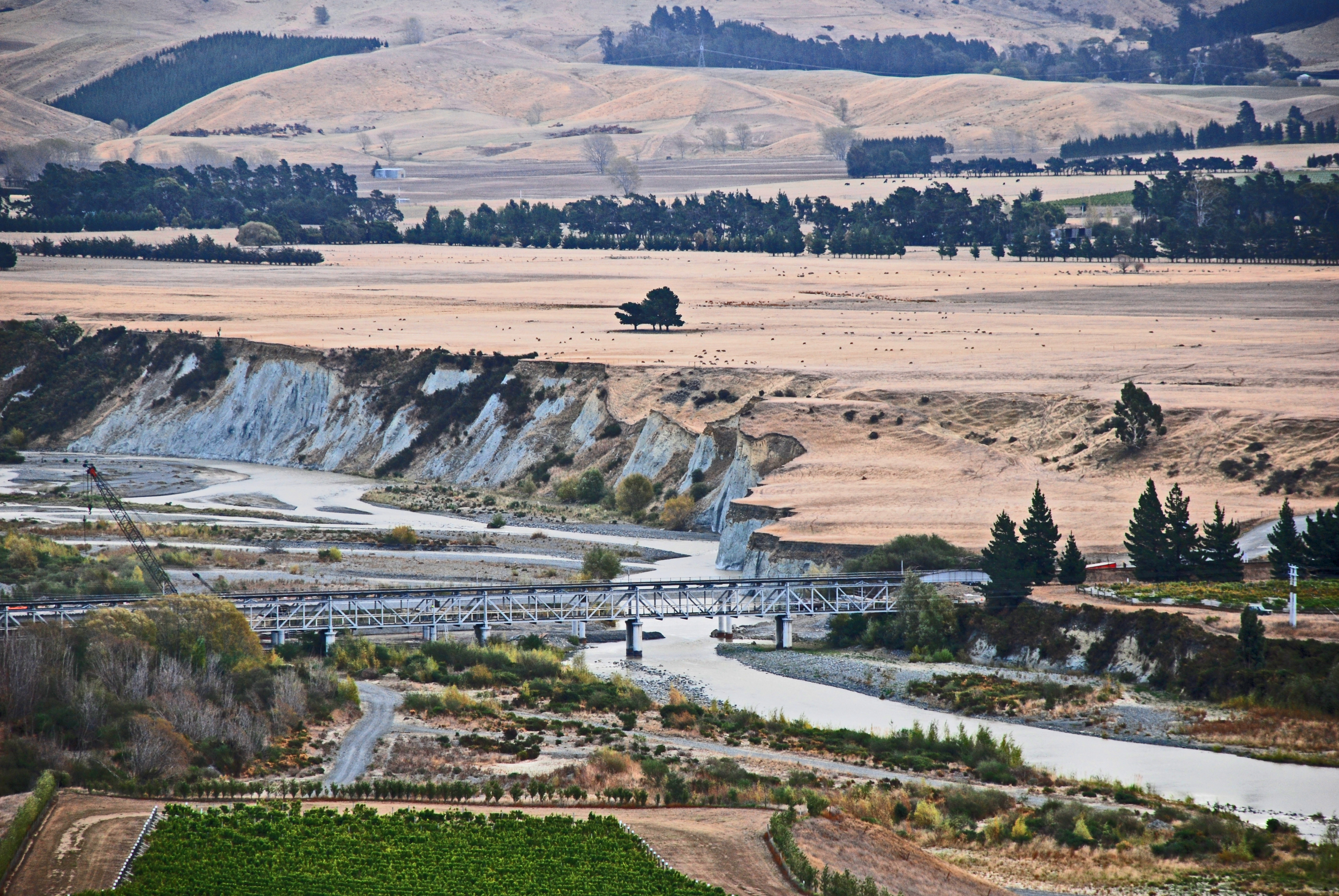
The double decker bridge across the Awatere River

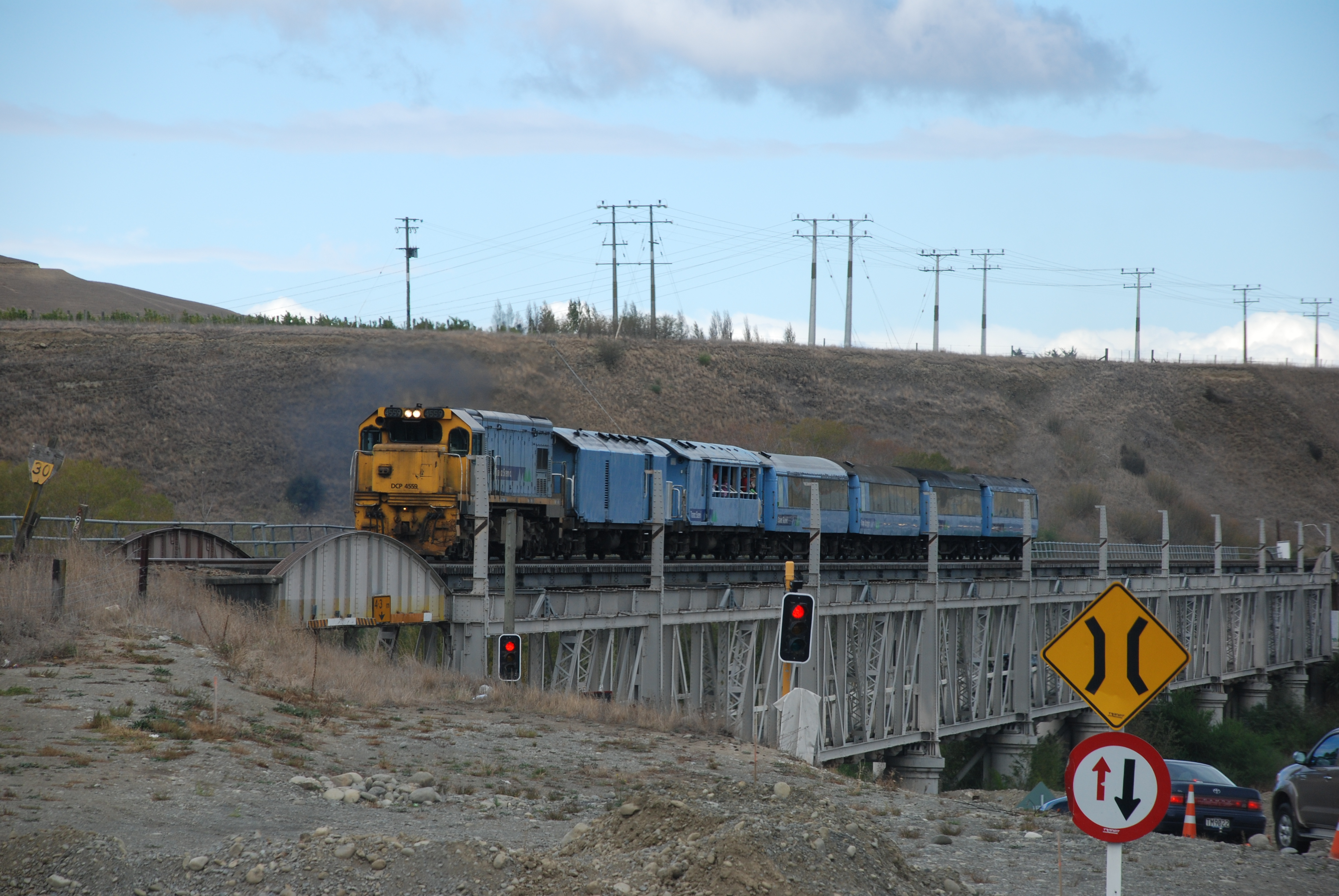
Trains use the upper level of the bridge. Road transport used the lower level until a new bridge was opened in November 2007.

== Education ==
Seddon School is the sole school in the town. It is a coeducational full primary (year 1–8) school with a roll of 127 as of July 2026. It opened in 1883. Seaview, Marama, Blind River, Grassmere and Tetley Brook schools in the lower Awatere Valley amalgamated to Seddon School in 1938.

The nearest state secondary schools are Marlborough Boys' College and Marlborough Girls' College in Blenheim.

== Climate ==
Climate data for Seddon (1991–2020)
Month	Jan	Feb	Mar	Apr	May	Jun	Jul	Aug	Sep	Oct	Nov	Dec	Year
Mean daily maximum °C (°F)	23.7 (74.7)	24.0 (75.2)	22.2 (72.0)	19.1 (66.4)	16.5 (61.7)	14.0 (57.2)	13.0 (55.4)	14.1 (57.4)	16.3 (61.3)	17.9 (64.2)	19.5 (67.1)	22.8 (73.0)	18.6 (65.5)
Daily mean °C (°F)	17.8 (64.0)	17.5 (63.5)	15.8 (60.4)	13.1 (55.6)	10.9 (51.6)	8.4 (47.1)	7.7 (45.9)	8.4 (47.1)	10.5 (50.9)	12.1 (53.8)	13.8 (56.8)	16.4 (61.5)	12.7 (54.9)
Mean daily minimum °C (°F)	11.9 (53.4)	11.0 (51.8)	9.3 (48.7)	7.1 (44.8)	5.3 (41.5)	2.8 (37.0)	2.3 (36.1)	2.7 (36.9)	4.8 (40.6)	6.3 (43.3)	8.1 (46.6)	10.0 (50.0)	6.8 (44.2)
Average rainfall mm (inches)	53.1 (2.09)	35.5 (1.40)	50.6 (1.99)	30.8 (1.21)	48.4 (1.91)	72.5 (2.85)	74.6 (2.94)	40.6 (1.60)	53.5 (2.11)	48.6 (1.91)	73.7 (2.90)	43.2 (1.70)	625.1 (24.61)
Source: NIWA
