= Molesworth Station =

Cattle station in New Zealand

Coordinates: 42.09024°S 173.1924°E

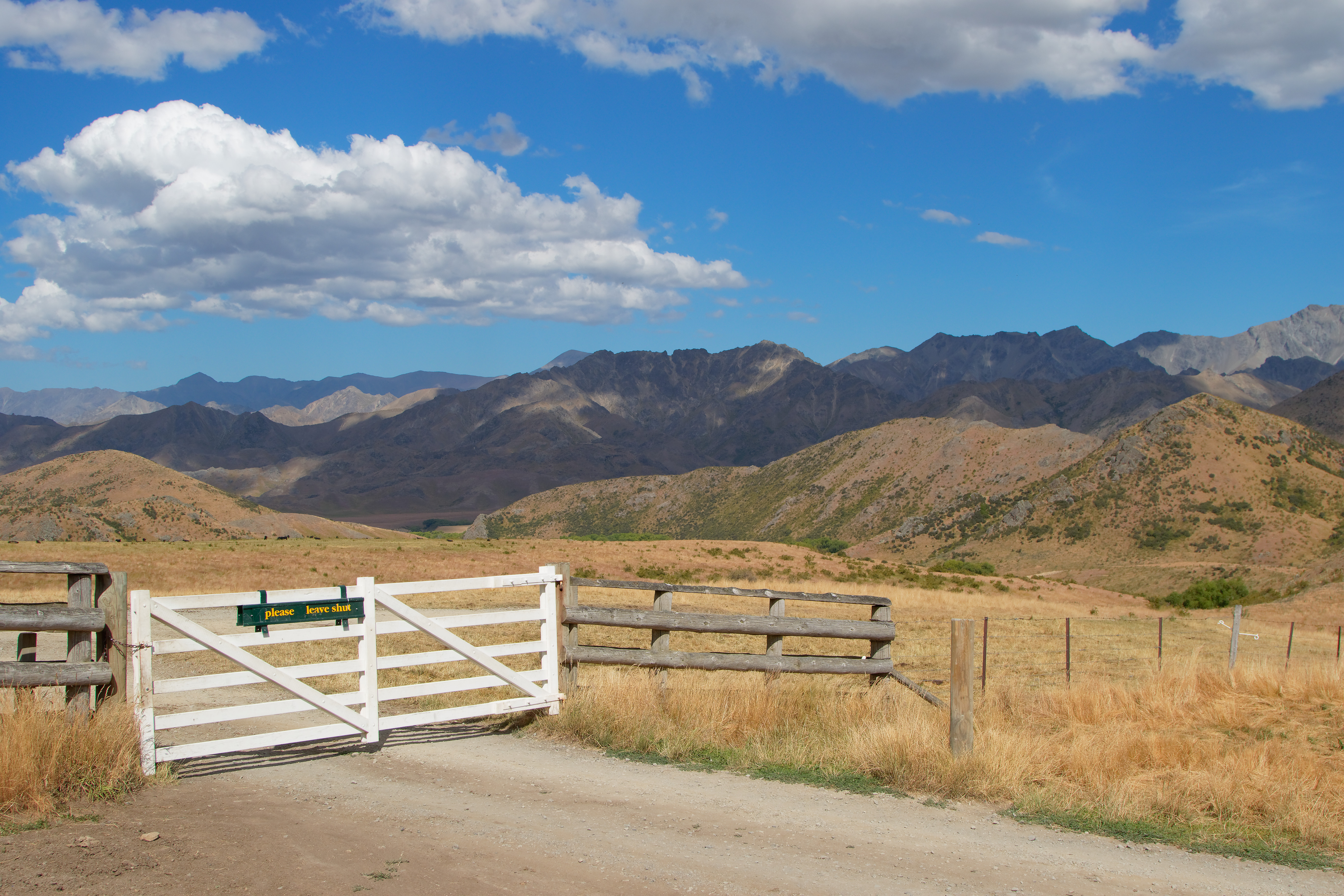
Molesworth station

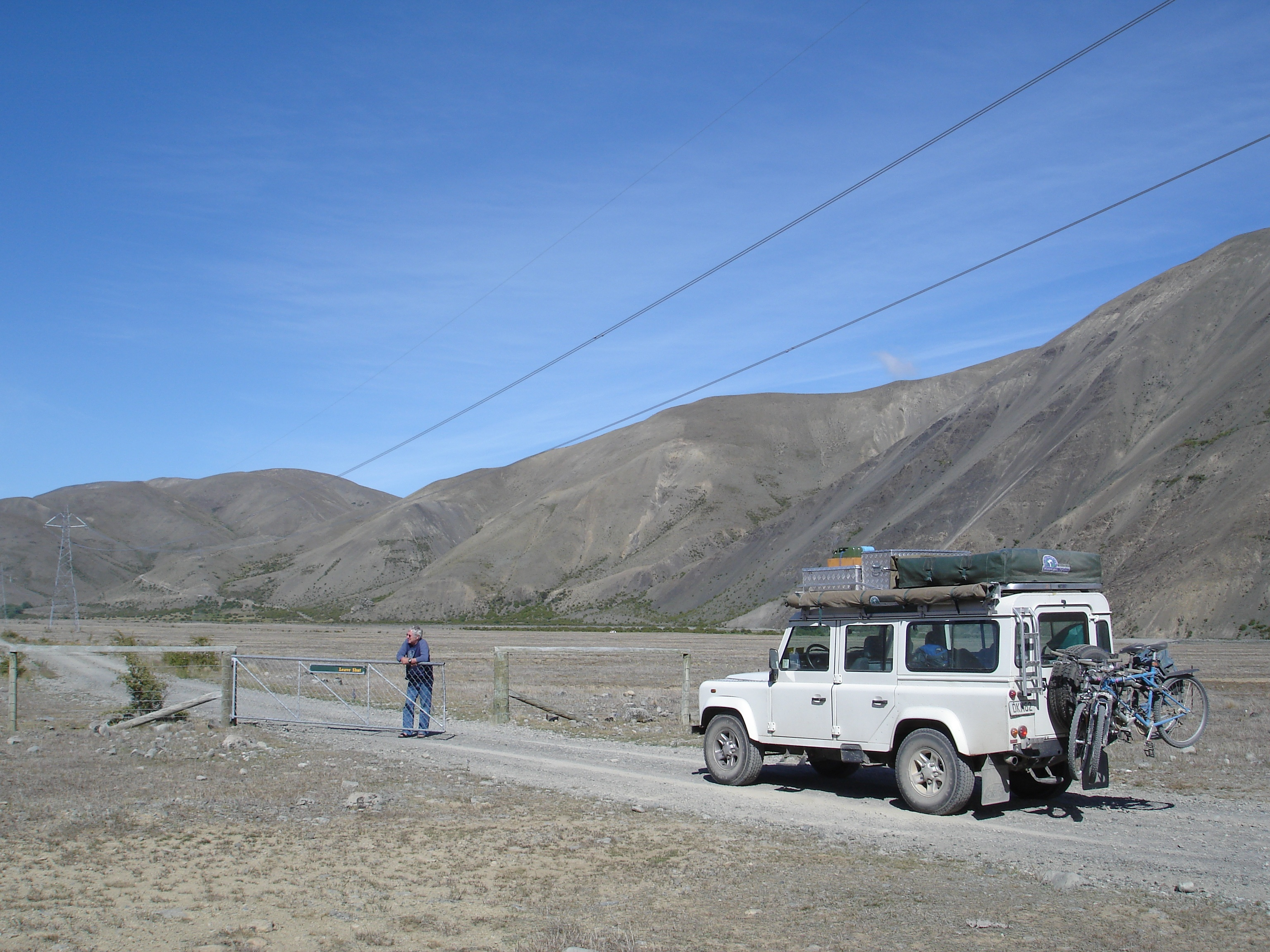
Molesworth station includes high-country areas.

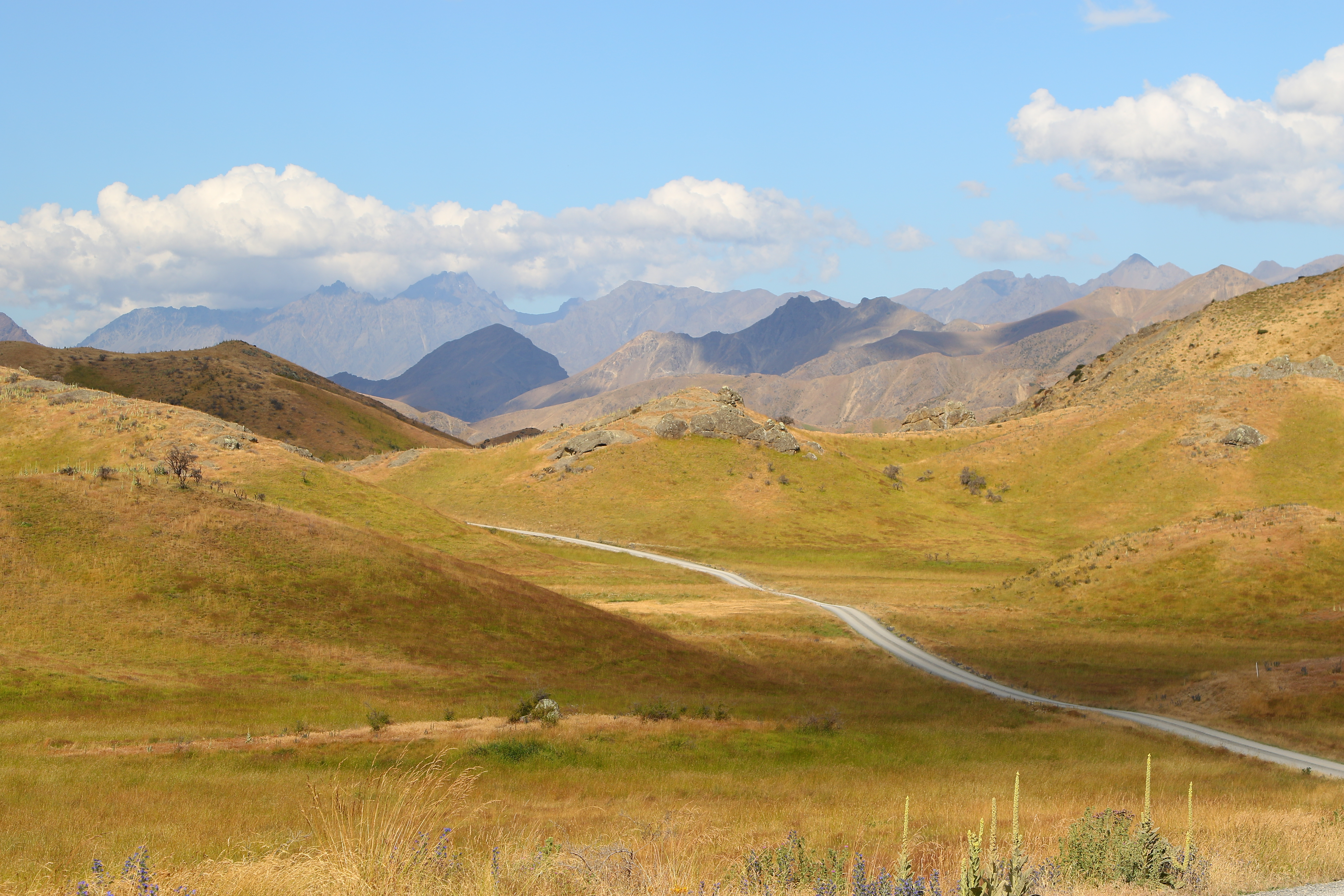
Molesworth east

Molesworth Station is a high country cattle station. It is located behind the Inland Kaikōura Mountain range in the South Island's Marlborough District. It is New Zealand's largest farm, at over 1,800 square kilometres (440,000 acres) and supports the country's biggest herd of cattle. It also hosts government science programs, such as research into bovine tuberculosis and related research into possums. The station helps rabbit population reduction.

The present station was formed in 1949 when a third station, St Helens, was added to Tarndale and Molesworth stations which had been amalgamated in 1938 after the runholders "walked off" the land. The three stations had once run around 95,000 head of sheep. The land was brought back into production by a major investment in rabbit control followed by revegetation of the barren ground. Cattle replaced the sheep.

The land is owned by the Crown and is leased for farming. On 1 July 2005, administration of the land was handed to the New Zealand Department of Conservation.

The HVDC Inter-Island transmission line passes through the station.

== Molesworth Station ==
=== Livestock and their managers ===
Molesworth is a high country cattle station. Its Angus and Angus/Hereford-cross cattle range free on the high country in summer months and graze in the warmer valleys during winter. They are cared for by a team of stockmen camping with their dogs and horses in remote huts. Each October/November they achieve a calving rate of 92 per cent. The calves are weaned just before their mothers drop their next calf. Surplus heifers are sold as two-year-olds and steers as three-year-olds.

Permanent staff is five and another half-dozen stockmen are employed except in winter. During the most active periods there are around 80 horses and up to 45 working dogs working on the station. Molesworth uses aircraft to find cattle at mustering and to pick up any missed by the muster.

=== Weeds pests and diseases ===
Weed control is expensive. Briar, broom and wilding pine and the flatweed, hieracium. Possums and ferrets can transmit bovine tuberculosis

== Climate ==
Climate data for Molesworth, elevation 890 m (2,920 ft), (1991–2020 normals, extremes 1944–1992)
Month	Jan	Feb	Mar	Apr	May	Jun	Jul	Aug	Sep	Oct	Nov	Dec	Year
Record high °C (°F)	31.9 (89.4)	35.1 (95.2)	30.6 (87.1)	26.9 (80.4)	21.4 (70.5)	18.9 (66.0)	14.9 (58.8)	18.2 (64.8)	23.8 (74.8)	25.0 (77.0)	27.2 (81.0)	29.9 (85.8)	35.1 (95.2)
Mean daily maximum °C (°F)	21.3 (70.3)	21.2 (70.2)	18.8 (65.8)	15.4 (59.7)	11.8 (53.2)	8.4 (47.1)	6.9 (44.4)	8.6 (47.5)	11.7 (53.1)	13.8 (56.8)	16.2 (61.2)	18.7 (65.7)	14.4 (57.9)
Daily mean °C (°F)	13.9 (57.0)	14.0 (57.2)	11.8 (53.2)	8.6 (47.5)	5.8 (42.4)	3.0 (37.4)	1.8 (35.2)	3.3 (37.9)	5.9 (42.6)	7.8 (46.0)	9.8 (49.6)	12.2 (54.0)	8.2 (46.7)
Mean daily minimum °C (°F)	6.6 (43.9)	6.7 (44.1)	4.8 (40.6)	1.7 (35.1)	−0.3 (31.5)	−2.4 (27.7)	−3.3 (26.1)	−2.0 (28.4)	0.0 (32.0)	1.7 (35.1)	3.4 (38.1)	5.7 (42.3)	1.9 (35.4)
Record low °C (°F)	−2.8 (27.0)	−4.1 (24.6)	−6.9 (19.6)	−8.2 (17.2)	−12.5 (9.5)	−14.0 (6.8)	−13.0 (8.6)	−12.2 (10.0)	−9.4 (15.1)	−8.3 (17.1)	−6.7 (19.9)	−4.6 (23.7)	−14.0 (6.8)
Average rainfall mm (inches)	44.8 (1.76)	46.5 (1.83)	50.6 (1.99)	46.1 (1.81)	49.5 (1.95)	60.0 (2.36)	53.2 (2.09)	50.7 (2.00)	58.1 (2.29)	72.5 (2.85)	47.1 (1.85)	47.8 (1.88)	626.9 (24.66)
Source: NIWA

== Tourism ==
There are restrictions in place to protect the working farm. Bad weather may also close some other areas.

Molesworth Recreation Reserve ('Molesworth Station') is located NW of Kaikōura. It is accessible from Hanmer Springs in the south, Seddon in the north east, and St Arnaud in the north.

The primary route through Molesworth is the Acheron road, from Hanmer Springs to Seddon. This is the only route suitable for 2WD vehicles. Caravans, trailers, buses, and vehicles over 7m length are not permitted. The road is a single track for the most part. The road is unsealed but there are no fords, and the gradients are not steep. The road is approximately 200 km, with a maximum speed of 50 km/h, though practical road speeds are lower making for at least a 6hr journey.

=== Hanmer Springs to Acheron Accommodation House ===
Two different routes are available for this section. Jacks Pass, and Jollies Pass which is poorly maintained and requires 4WD.

=== Acheron Accommodation House ===
This is an historic house, and no accommodation is now provided. However simple camping facilities are available. The house itself is a cob construction.

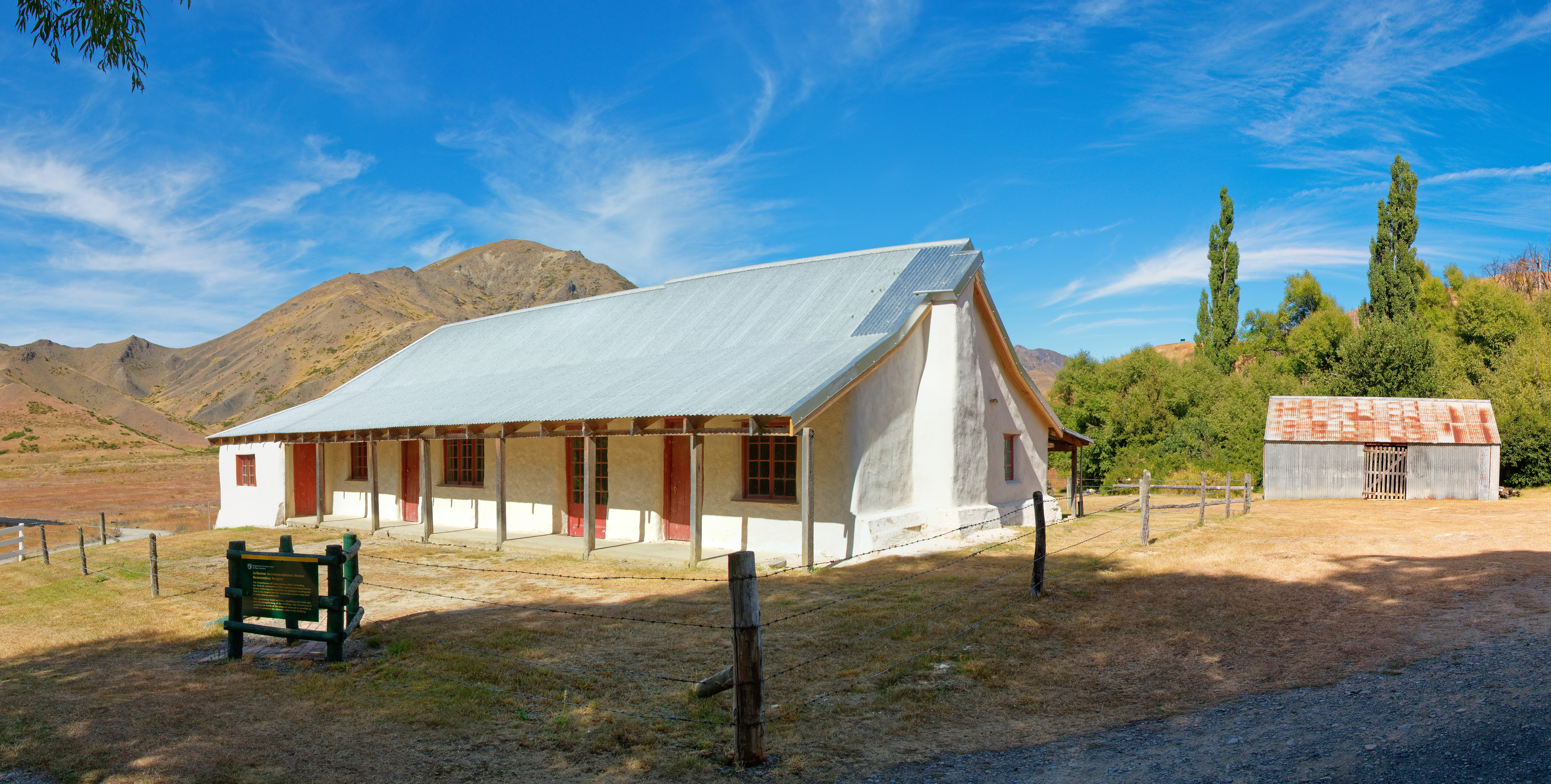
Acheron cob house

=== Acheron valley ===
The road follows the Acheron river for much of the route through Molesworth. In places the river runs in a gorge, and there are a number of historic bridges. The scenery is open grassland for the most part.

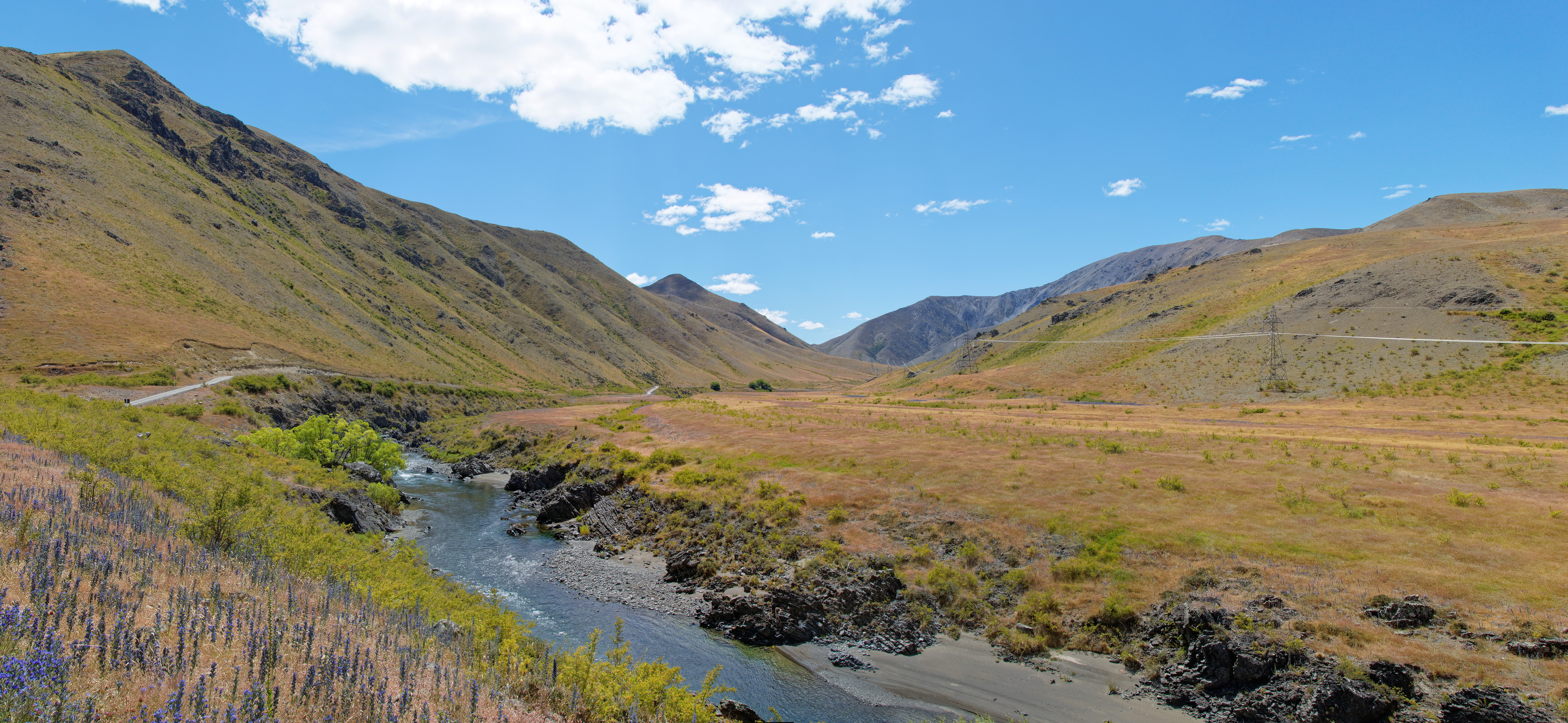
Acheron river

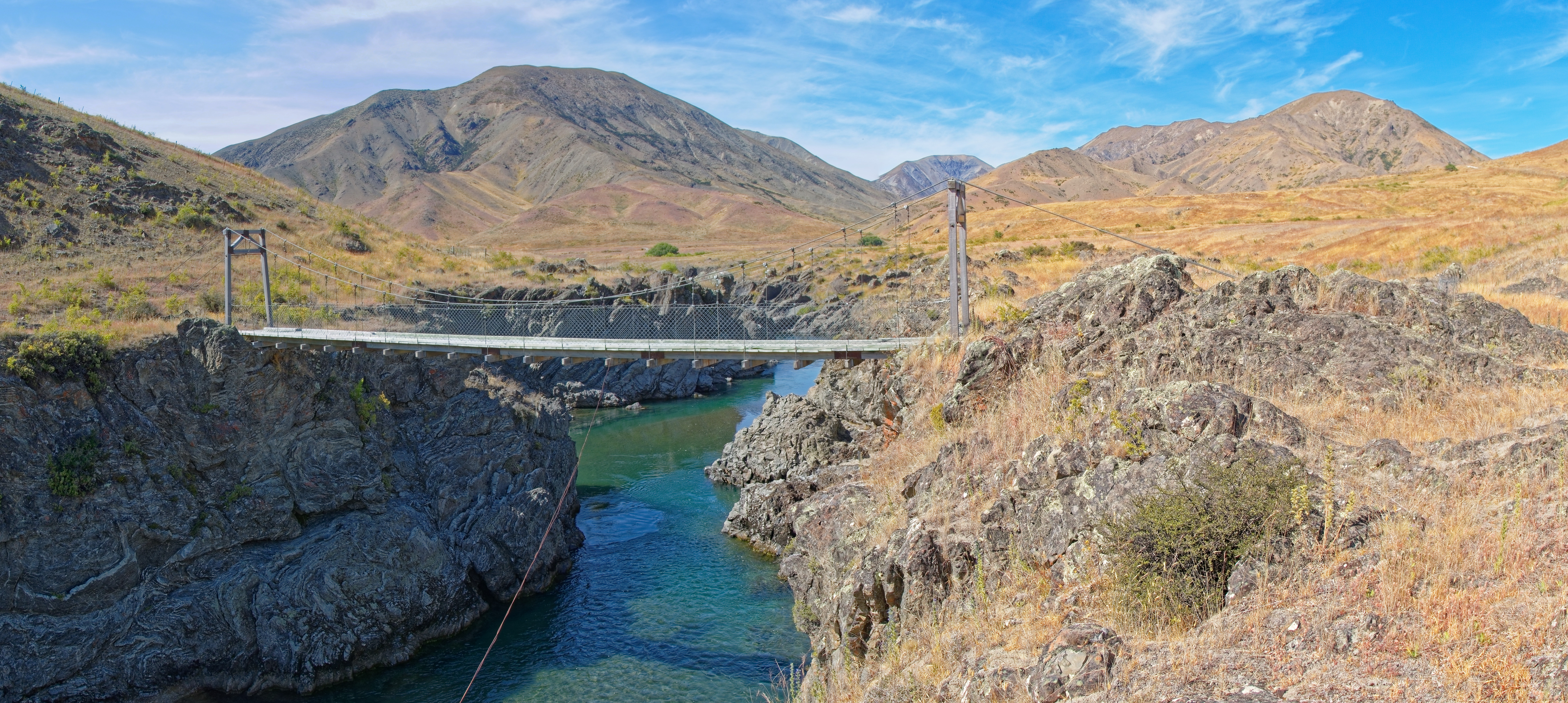
Student Bridge designed and built 1944 by C.U.C. engineering students

=== Isolated Flat ===
Travelling north, the road departs from the Acheron river to briefly follow the Severn river, then over the Isolated Saddle about 100m above the plain. It then descends again to the Isolated Flat, and again follows the Acheron river.

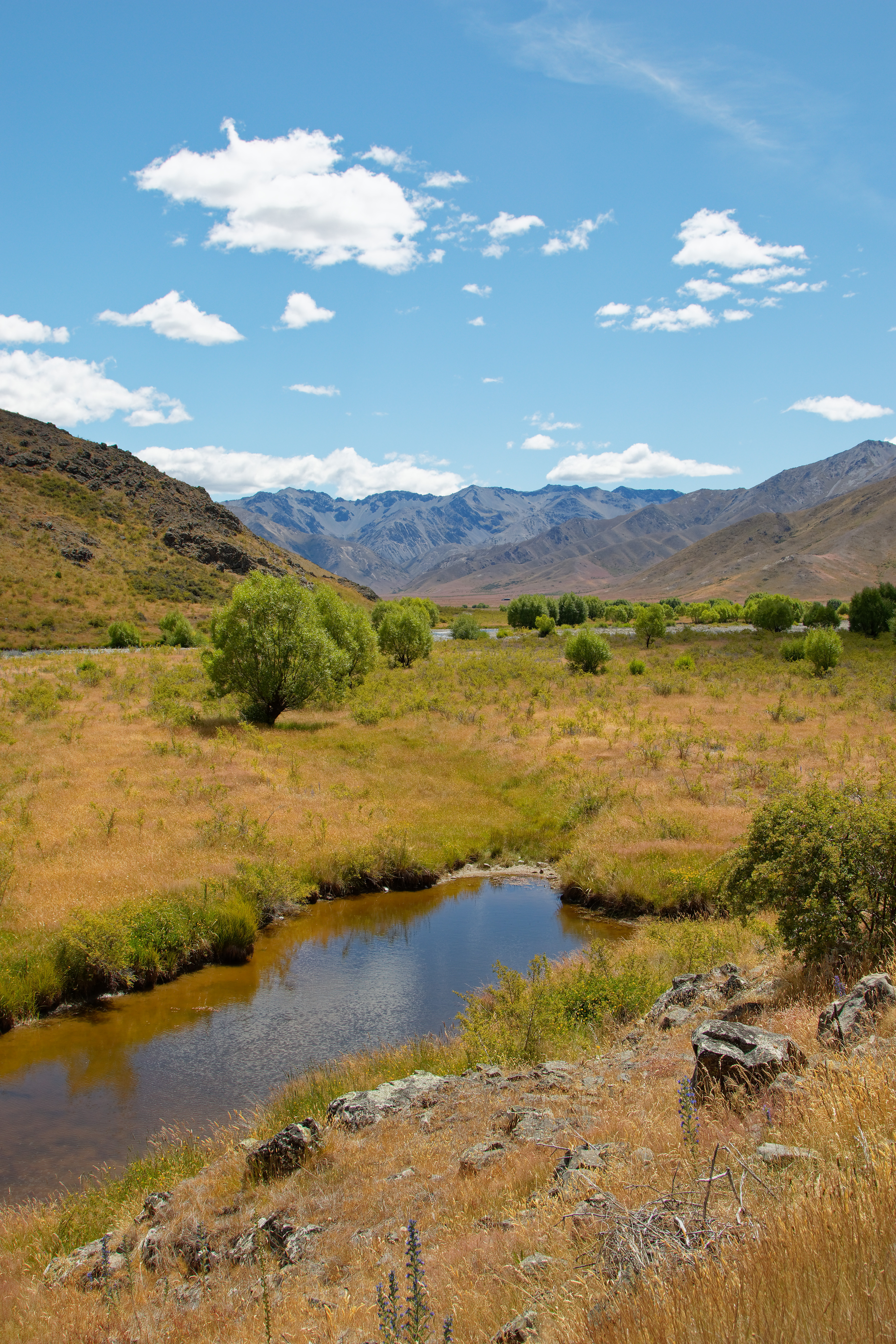
Molesworth Severn river

=== Wards Pass ===
Leaving the Acheron River, the road goes over Wards Pass, a climb of about 160 m, which brings the route into the upper reaches of the Awatere valley.

=== Molesworth Homestead ===
The historic homestead and the modern farm yards are located to the north of the Reserve. There is also a simple camp site here.

=== Awatere Valley ===
Leaving Molesworth station, the road continues through farmland in the Awatere valley. In the higher reaches the valley is narrow and the farming primarily stock (sheep and beef), but in the lower reaches towards Seddon it broadens and more cultivation becomes apparent including vineyards.

== See also ==
- Station (New Zealand agriculture)
- Wards Pass
