= Kaikōura Ranges =

Mountain range in South Island, New Zealand

Coordinates: 42°00′S 173°40′E

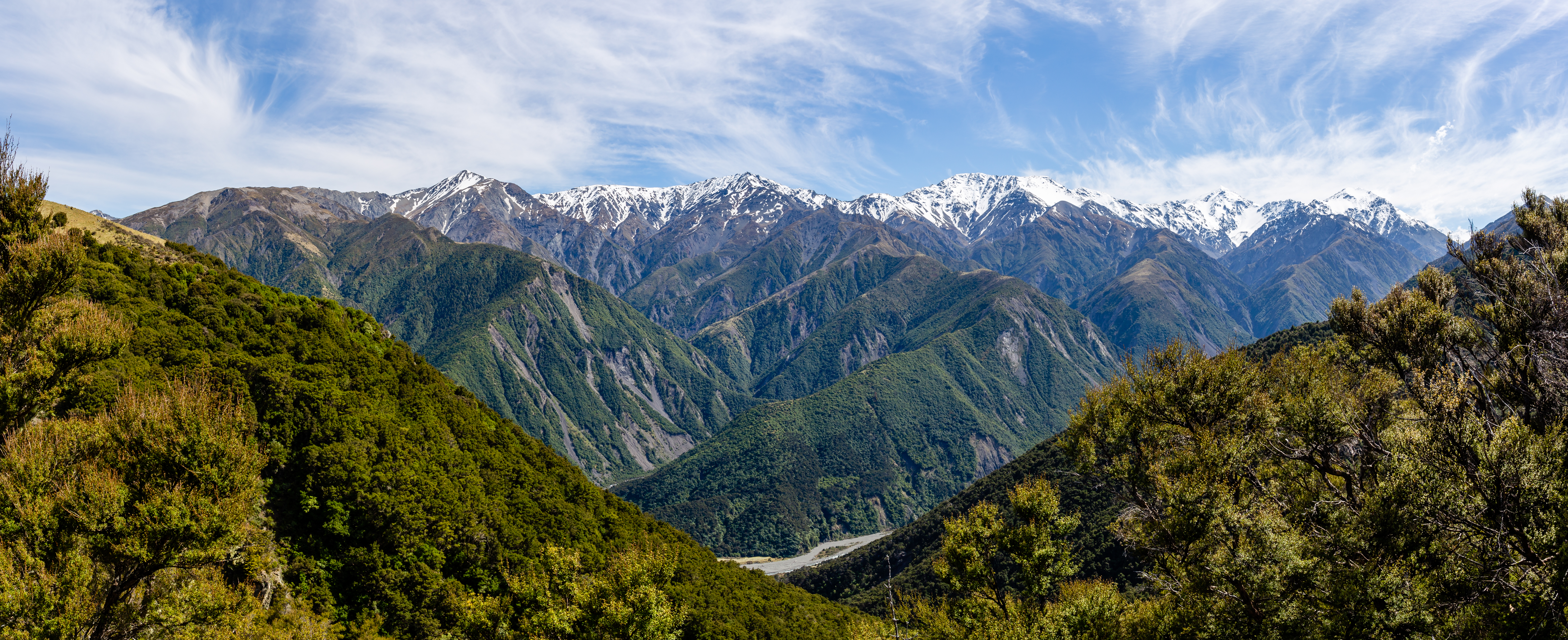
Kaikōura Ranges

The Kaikōura Ranges are two parallel ranges of mountains located in the Canterbury Region in the northeast of the South Island of New Zealand. The two ranges are visible from a great distance, including from the southern coast of the North Island.

== Geography ==
Both Kaikōura ranges are around 100 kilometres (62 mi) long, running south-west to north-east, and can be seen as the northernmost extension of the Southern Alps in the South Island. Named the Looker-on mountains by Captain James Cook, they take their current name from the town of Kaikōura at the southern extreme of the more eastern range, the Seaward Kaikōuras. This range rises straight from (and dominates) the coast to the north of the town, running from Mount Tinline to 30 kilometres (19 mi) southwest of Ward, and reaches its highest point with the 2,608-metre (8,556 ft) Mount Manakau.

The long straight river valley of the Waiau Toa / Clarence River separate the Seaward Kaikōuras from the longer and loftier Inland Kaikōuras. This latter range runs from Turk Head to Blue Mountain, and contains the highest peak in the ranges–and highest mountain for hundreds of kilometres–the 2,885-metre (9,465 ft) Tapuae-o-Uenuku, whose Māori name translates as the poetic "Footprint of the rainbow." Beyond the Inland Kaikōuras is the valley of the Awatere River, which runs parallel to that of the Waiau Toa / Clarence. The climate is characterised by a dry cold winter. Because the Kaikōura Ranges block cold Antarctic weather fronts from the south, snow can fall at any time, even in mid-summer.

== Geology ==
The Kaikōura Ranges straddle the boundary between the Pacific and Australian plates and were uplifted by tectonic activity along the Marlborough Fault System. Although fundamentally composed of the same Torlesse rocks, they are made up of alternating sandstone and sandstone/mudstone sequences; the latter are more prone to erosion, and so the mountains vary in height and appearance, with knob and swale (peak and trough) topography.

The Seaward Kaikōura Range is estimated to be 4–5 million years old (Late Pliocene–Pleistocene), while the Inland Kaikōuras are slightly older, beginning their uplift in the late Miocene. Tapuae-o-Uenuku, now nearly 3 km above sea level, had its beginnings as a magma chamber 3–4 km below the Torlesse rocks, which in turn had been buried by 2 km of rock over the last 100 million years. Thus the Inland Kaikōuras have been uplifted almost 9 km; without substantial erosion they would be taller than the Himalayas. The Seaward Kaikōuras are still rising, being uplifted by an estimated 4–6 m per thousand years, but eroding only 1.8 m per thousand years.

The most recent period of mountain building in New Zealand, starting in the early Miocene when the Australian/Pacific plate boundary moved to its current position, is called the Kaikōura orogeny and takes its name from these mountains.

== Demographics ==
The statistical area of Kaikōura Ranges includes Kekerengu, Clarence, Rakautara, Goose Bay, and Oaro. It covers 2,037.57 km^{2} (786.71 sq mi) and had an estimated population of 1,980 as of June 2025, with a population density of 1.0 people per km^{2}.

Historical population
Year	Pop.	±% p.a.
2006	1,419	—
2013	1,545	+1.22%
2018	1,689	+1.80%
2023	1,899	+2.37%

Kaikōura Ranges had a population of 1,899 in the 2023 New Zealand census, an increase of 210 people (12.4%) since the 2018 census, and an increase of 354 people (22.9%) since the 2013 census. There were 990 males and 909 females in 726 dwellings. 1.6% of people identified as LGBTIQ+. The median age was 46.9 years (compared with 38.1 years nationally). There were 312 people (16.4%) aged under 15 years, 258 (13.6%) aged 15 to 29, 954 (50.2%) aged 30 to 64, and 375 (19.7%) aged 65 or older.

People could identify as more than one ethnicity. The results were 88.9% European (Pākehā); 18.3% Māori; 0.8% Pasifika; 3.2% Asian; 0.6% Middle Eastern, Latin American and African New Zealanders (MELAA); and 4.9% other, which includes people giving their ethnicity as "New Zealander". English was spoken by 98.4%, Māori by 3.5%, and other languages by 5.4%. No language could be spoken by 1.3% (e.g. too young to talk). New Zealand Sign Language was known by 0.5%. The percentage of people born overseas was 13.3, compared with 28.8% nationally.

Religious affiliations were 29.1% Christian, 0.3% Hindu, 0.6% Islam, 0.6% Māori religious beliefs, 0.3% Buddhist, 0.2% New Age, 0.2% Jewish, and 1.1% other religions. People who answered that they had no religion were 60.0%, and 8.2% of people did not answer the census question.

Of those at least 15 years old, 249 (15.7%) people had a bachelor's or higher degree, 930 (58.6%) had a post-high school certificate or diploma, and 405 (25.5%) people exclusively held high school qualifications. The median income was $33,600, compared with $41,500 nationally. 126 people (7.9%) earned over $100,000 compared to 12.1% nationally. The employment status of those at least 15 was 771 (48.6%) full-time, 321 (20.2%) part-time, and 15 (0.9%) unemployed.

== Flora ==
These mountains are characterised by tussock land, fellfields, and large areas of open scree, while lowland forests have largely been cleared. The Spencer range to the south meanwhile has a more intact beech forest covering.

== Fauna ==
The ranges contain the Kowhai Valley and Shearwater Stream Important Bird Area, some 15 km (9.3 mi) inland from the coastal town of Kaikōura.

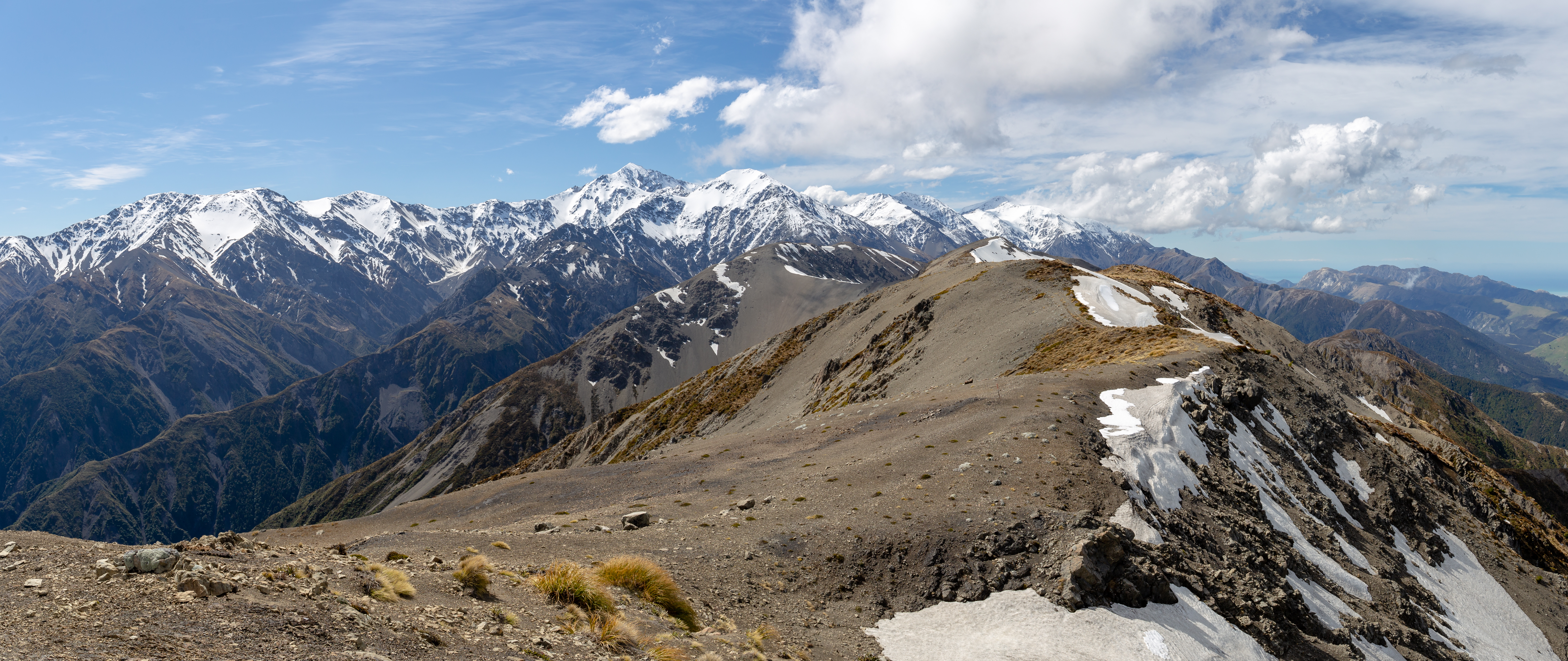
View of Kaikōura Ranges from Mt Fyffe
