= Awatere River =

River in Marlborough, New Zealand

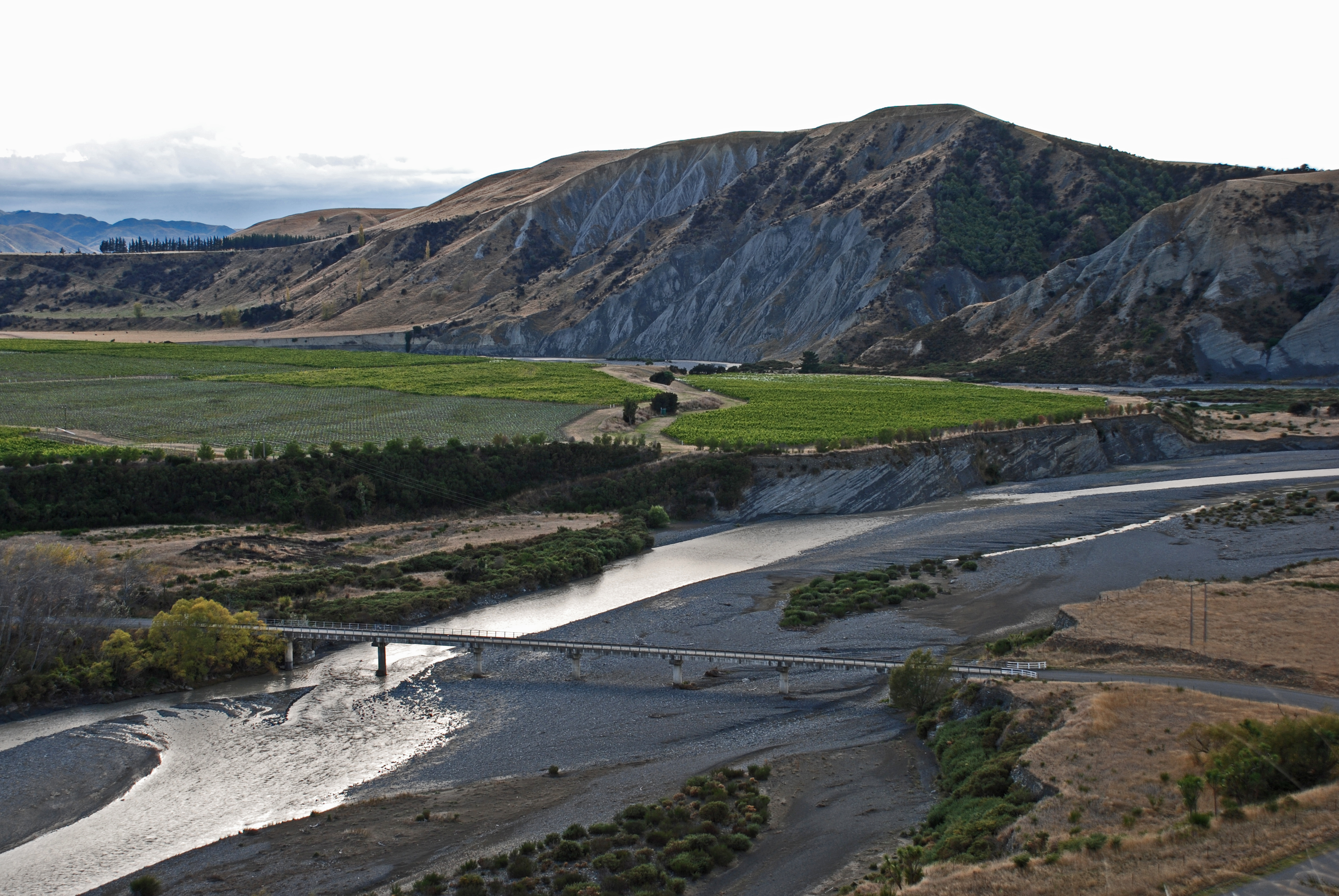
- Etymology: translation of "swift river"
- Native name: Awatere (Māori)

Location
- Country: New Zealand
- Region: Marlborough

Physical characteristics
- Mouth
  - location: Cook Strait
  - coordinates: 41.608°S 174.167°E
- Length: 110 km (68 mi)

The Awatere River is a large river flowing through Marlborough, New Zealand. Flowing along the trace of the active Awatere Fault, it runs northeast through a straight valley to the west of the Inland Kaikōura mountains. This valley is parallel with that of the Waiau Toa / Clarence River, 20 kilometres (12 mi) to the south.

It flows for 110 kilometres (68 mi) from its source in the mountainous interior to reach Cook Strait close to the town of Seddon.

The New Zealand Ministry for Culture and Heritage gives a translation of "swift river" for Awatere in Māori.

== Demographics ==
The Awatere River valley, which corresponds to the statistical area of Awatere, covers 3,273.52 km^{2} (1,263.91 sq mi), and includes the settlements of Seddon and Ward. It had an estimated population of 1,780 as of June 2025, with a population density of 0.5 people per km^{2}.

Historical population
Year	Pop.	±% p.a.
2006	1,608	—
2013	1,626	+0.16%
2018	1,617	−0.11%
2023	1,737	+1.44%

Awatere had a population of 1,737 in the 2023 New Zealand census, an increase of 120 people (7.4%) since the 2018 census, and an increase of 111 people (6.8%) since the 2013 census. There were 915 males, 816 females, and 6 people of other genders in 678 dwellings. 2.2% of people identified as LGBTIQ+. The median age was 43.1 years (compared with 38.1 years nationally). There were 357 people (20.6%) aged under 15 years, 243 (14.0%) aged 15 to 29, 858 (49.4%) aged 30 to 64, and 282 (16.2%) aged 65 or older.

People could identify as more than one ethnicity. The results were 90.5% European (Pākehā); 15.0% Māori; 2.6% Pasifika; 1.7% Asian; 0.3% Middle Eastern, Latin American and African New Zealanders (MELAA); and 3.8% other, which includes people giving their ethnicity as "New Zealander". English was spoken by 97.9%, Māori by 2.2%, Samoan by 0.2%, and other languages by 5.2%. No language could be spoken by 1.9% (e.g. too young to talk). New Zealand Sign Language was known by 0.3%. The percentage of people born overseas was 11.4, compared with 28.8% nationally.

Religious affiliations were 28.7% Christian, 0.2% Islam, 0.2% Māori religious beliefs, and 0.9% other religions. People who answered that they had no religion were 61.3%, and 9.0% of people did not answer the census question.

Of those at least 15 years old, 213 (15.4%) people had a bachelor's or higher degree, 810 (58.7%) had a post-high school certificate or diploma, and 354 (25.7%) people exclusively held high school qualifications. The median income was $44,600, compared with $41,500 nationally. 135 people (9.8%) earned over $100,000 compared to 12.1% nationally. The employment status of those at least 15 was 798 (57.8%) full-time, 225 (16.3%) part-time, and 18 (1.3%) unemployed.

== Awatere River bridges ==
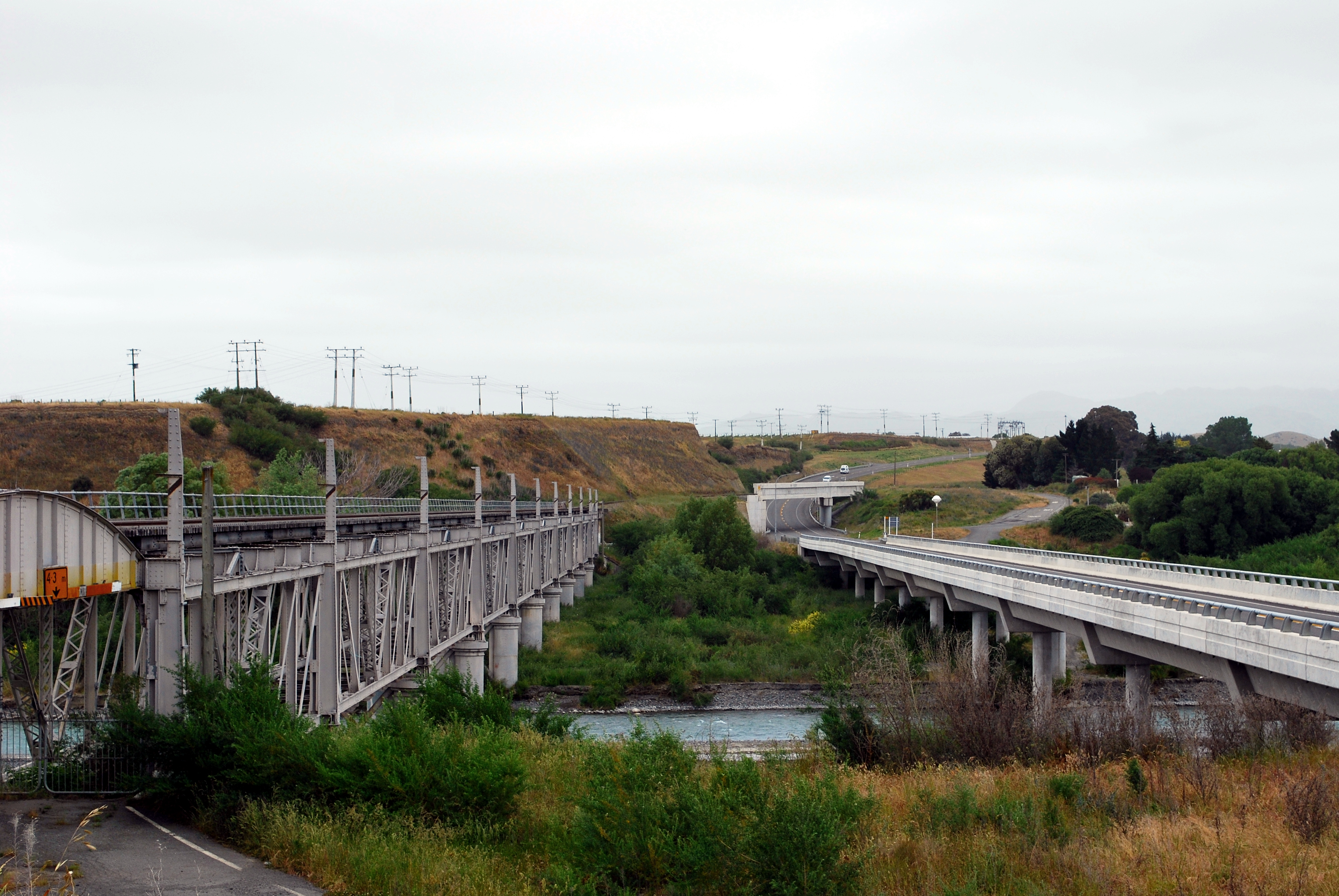
Awatere River Bridges

In 1887, the Awatere River was without any bridge crossing and at the time was noted by Parliament to be the only river not bridged between Picton and Bluff. Planning of a 325-metre joint road and rail bridge began in 1896, designed by Peter Seton Hay, and construction by Scott Brothers Ltd, a Christchurch based company, began two years after. Back in those times, bridge building lacked the modern engineering technology that is used today, and much of the construction was done via human and animal power. The laying of caissons which formed the foundations of the bridge was notoriously treacherous to workers at the risk of developing the bends due to long exposure of working in pressurised conditions. Construction was completed on 18 July 1901. The original road and rail bridge was opened on 10 October 1902. Construction took three years at the cost of £22,500. A further £118 was spent to add a wind break to protect trains.

State Highway 1 crosses the Awatere River at its current point just north of Seddon. The initial bridge remained the crossing until 2007 when most recently traffic signals were added to either direction to control vehicles on the platform, which was only wide enough for one lane of traffic. A new $15 million two-lane road bridge was constructed with the railway being the sole use of the original bridge. The new road bridge opened to traffic in December 2008 and was officially opened on 31 January 2009. The vehicle deck on the original bridge was then decommissioned as it was deemed too expensive to retain its use for pedestrians and cyclists.

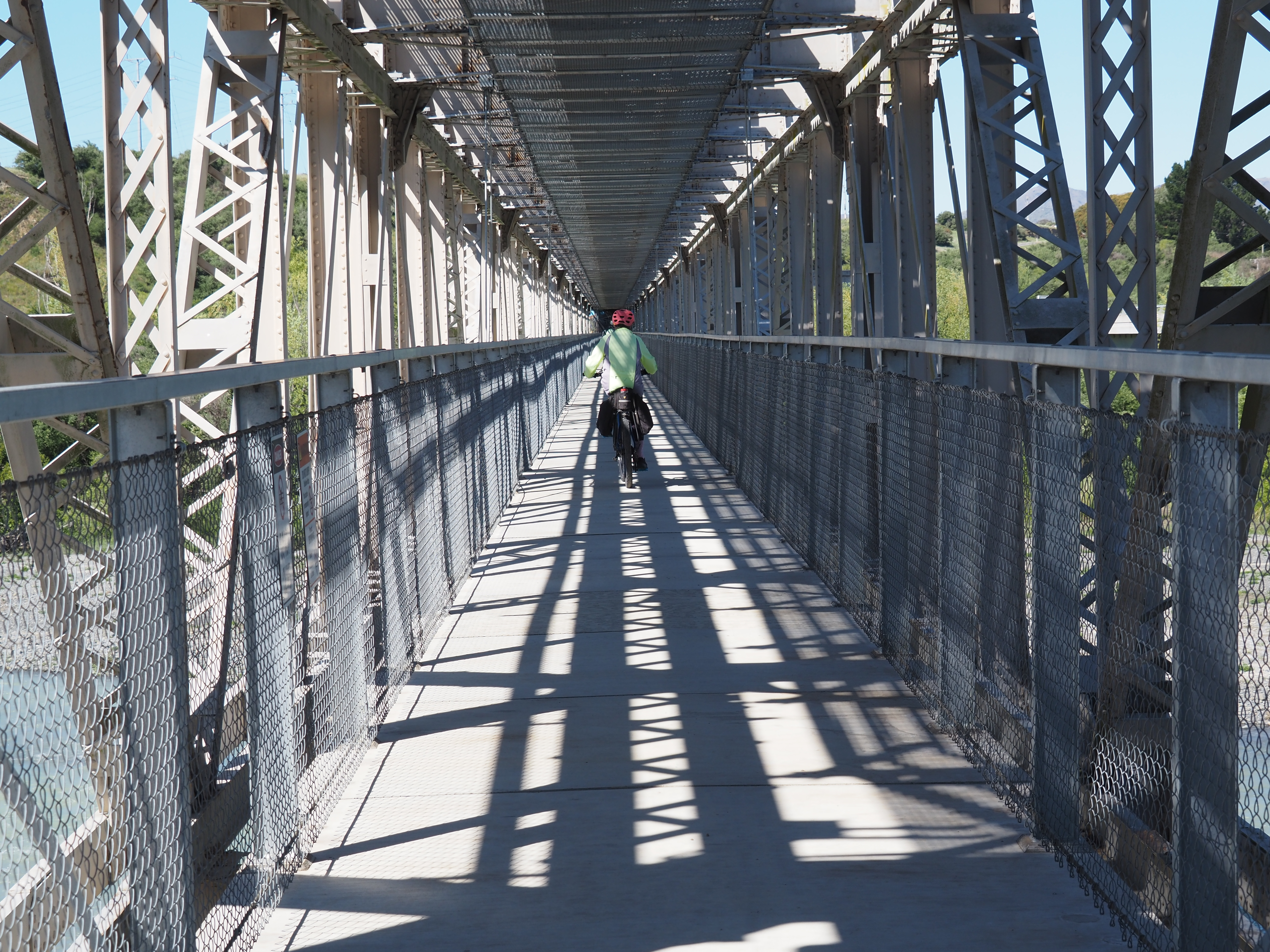
Awatere River road-rail bridge cycle deck

However, the former single-lane vehicle deck below the rail deck was restored and re-opened for cyclists and walkers in December 2023, as part of the Whale Trail, a long-distance trail under construction between Picton and Kaikōura.
