= Brownlee Tramway =

Logging railway in New Zealand

Coordinates: 41.27°S 173.75°E

The Brownlee Tramway of Marlborough, New Zealand, (as opposed to the later Bell Hill mill tramway in Westland) was a bush tramway of the Rai and Pelorus Valleys used to take timber from the Carluke Sawmill through to the shipping port and mill of Blackball, Havelock. It operated from c.1881 through to 1915 as part of William Brownlee's (and later his son, John's) extensive sawmilling operation in the area.

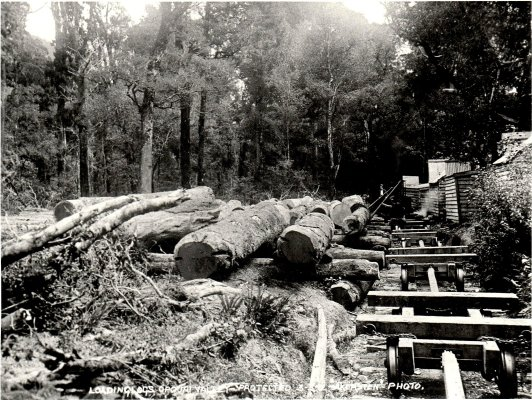
Logs in lower Opouri Valley to be railed to Carluke band saw mill

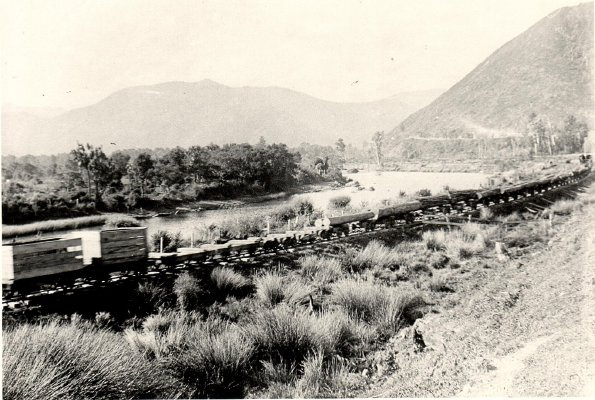
Steam locomotive Opouri hauling logs down to the mill at Blackball

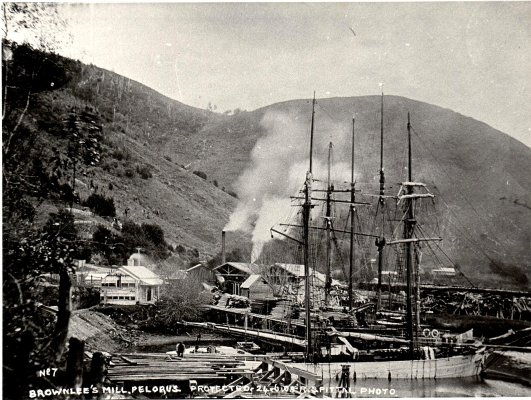
Brownlee's sawmill at Blackball on the Pelorus River

All photographs courtesy of Brownlee Collection at Marlborough Museum – Marlborough Historical Society Inc

== Line ==
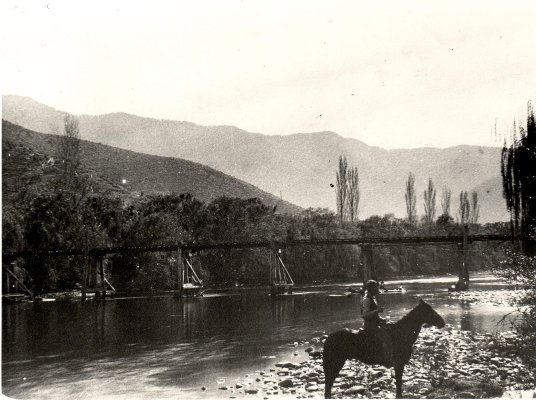
Dalton's bridge over the Pelorus River

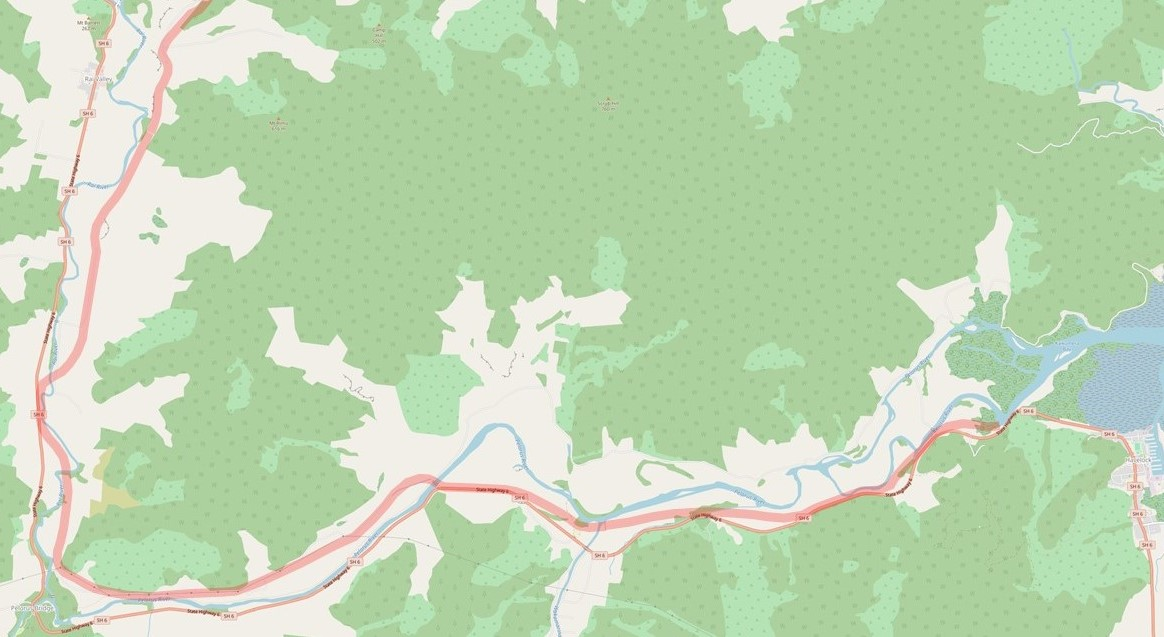
Map of the route

The tramway was built to 3 ft 6 in (1,067 mm) gauge, and to a comparatively high standard for the possibility of a government takeover to form a line to Nelson. It totaled 29 kilometres (18 mi) in 1906 and was the only significant tramway in the Marlborough Region. Carluke, a sawmill and settlement near Rai Valley township (named after the Scottish town in which the Brownlee family hailed from) was where the main line began. It headed south through the Rai Valley, and joined the Pelorus River valley on the north side, opposite to the Pelorus River Reserve and Pelorus Bridge. It turned eastwards and followed the Pelorus River until crossing it at 'Dalton's Bridge'. The formation from here now mostly forms part of State Highway 6 until where it crossed the Wakamarina River at Canvastown. An embankment on the east side is still visible today. From here it carried on closely to the main road with some parts having been used by the road since closure until terminating at Blackball. Very little remains at Blackball today except the hull of the abandoned SS Pelorus.

== Locomotives ==
Name	Maker	Maker's Number	Year	Type	Photo	Notes
Aunt Sally	Barclay	718	1892	Conventional	No. 8 at Brownlees Mill Carluke hauling timber to Pelorus	Was built coupled to a log winch, which was powered by the loco with long coupling rods when the wheels were jacked up off the rails. Converted from 0-4-0 to 2-4-2 (and lost the winch) to handle temporary tramway tracks better. A Shanks boiler, saddle tank and cab were fitted in its later life at Ruru. It is now preserved at Havelock Museum.
Opouri	Stearns	1063	1902	Geared (Heisler)		Fell into the Pelorus River when the Dalton's Bridge collapsed, 1911. David Young was the driver and was injured so that had 69 days sick leave to recover. Engine unit remains stored at the Bush Tramway Club.
Twins	Barclay	1130A	1907	Conventional		1130A+B were built as a twin locomotive, which was just two tank engines semi-permanently coupled back to back. They were soon separated and used independently. 1130A stayed with Brownlees working at Ruru on the West Coast and is now preserved in Tauranga.
Twins	Barclay	1130B	1907	Conventional		After uncoupling 1130A+B, only 1130B went to the North Island in 1917 and was probably scrapped.

Several self-built internal combustion engine powered trolley was used on the tramway. There were other small locomotives trialed on the tramway as well (see below).

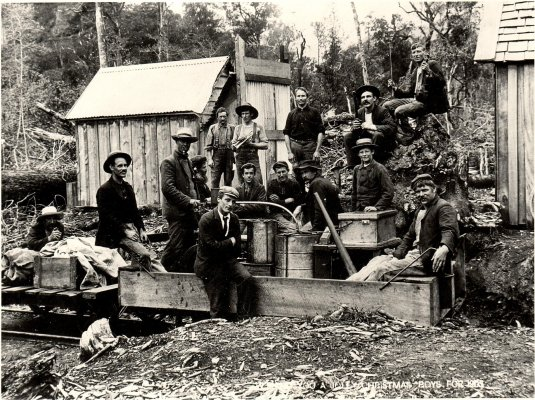
Brownlee's Bushmen with musical instruments

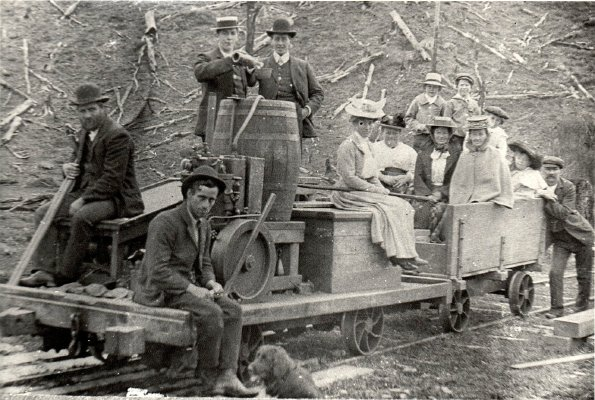
Picnic party on a powered trolley

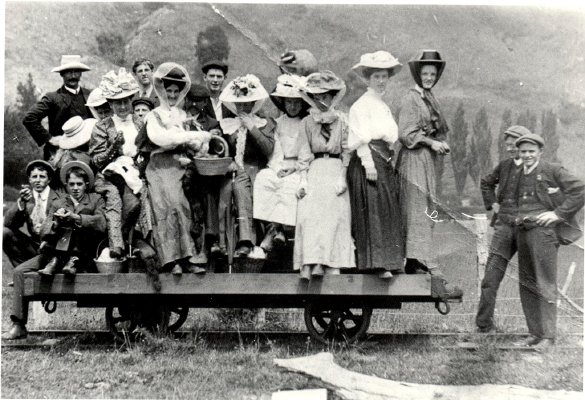
Picnic party on a powered trolley

== Other Tramways ==
Brownlee's operated an earlier tramway in the Kaituna Valley south of Havelock in the 1870s. it was not connected to the later Carluke-Blackball tramway. A small vertical boilered loco once worked the line, but did not prove successful.

When the native forest milling rights ran out around the Rai Valley, Brownlee's moved to the West Coast, based in Ruru. William Brownlee was one of the main shareholders of the Lake Brunner Sawmilling Company, and later bought the remaining shares out.

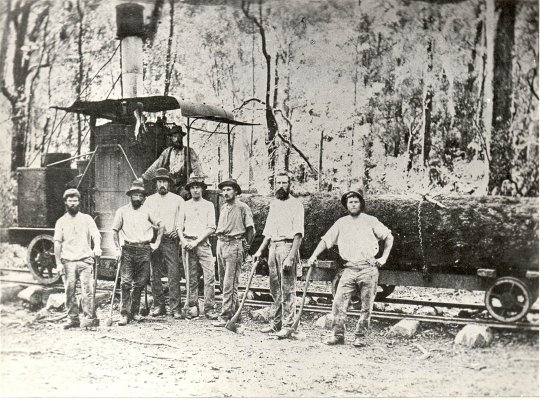
Vertical boilered steam engine on Kaituna Valley tramway 1868-1880

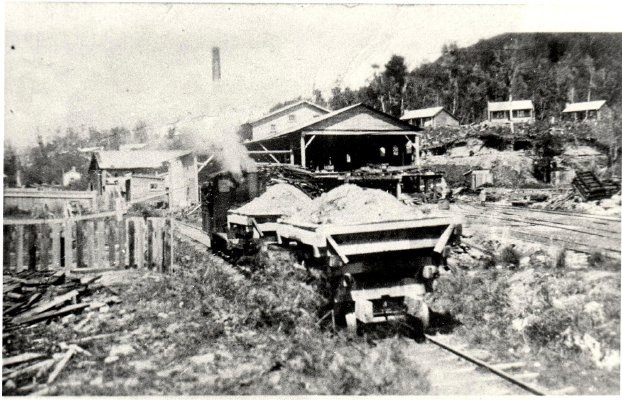
Johnson loco Chaffcutter purchased 1906 at the Lake Brunner mill

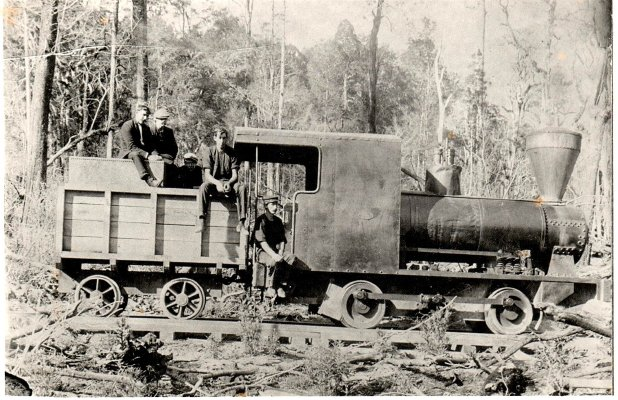
'Originally a Brownlee Lokey' hauling logs on another line
