= Whangamoa Saddle =

Mountain pass in New Zealand

Coordinates: 41°13′30″S 173°25′30″E

The Whangamoa Saddle is a pass traversed by State Highway 6 on its route between Blenheim and Nelson, immediately to the east of Hira. One of the two passes on the route (along with the Rai Saddle to the east), the Whangamoa Saddle lies between the valleys of the Whangamoa and Wakapuaka Rivers south of Delaware Bay. The elevation of the pass is 466 metres (1,529 ft) above sea level. The pass marks part of the boundary between Nelson and Marlborough District.
