= Lud River =

Coordinates: 41°13′S 173°24′E

Location
- Country: New Zealand

Physical characteristics
- Mouth
  - location: Wakapuaka River
- Length: 7 km (4.3 mi)

The Lud River is a river of the Nelson Region of New Zealand's South Island. It flows north from a ridge 10 kilometres (6 mi) east of Nelson city centre, reaching the Wakapuaka River close to the latter's outfall into Delaware Bay, an indentation in the eastern shore of Tasman Bay / Te Tai-o-Aorere.

== See also ==
- List of rivers of New Zealand
