= Collins River (New Zealand) =

Coordinates: 41°10′S 173°32′E

Collins River, New Zealand

Location
- Country: New Zealand

Physical characteristics
- Source
  - location: Bryant Range
- Mouth
  - location: Whangamoa River
  - elevation: 35 m (115 ft)
- Length: 3.5 km (2.2 mi)

The Collins River, New Zealand is a river of eastern Nelson, New Zealand. As a tributary of the Whangamoa River, it rises north of the Rai Saddle and flows north-westward to join that river at Whangamoa.

== See also ==
- List of rivers of New Zealand
