= Bryant Range =

Mountain range in New Zealand

Coordinates: 41°20′S 173°23′E

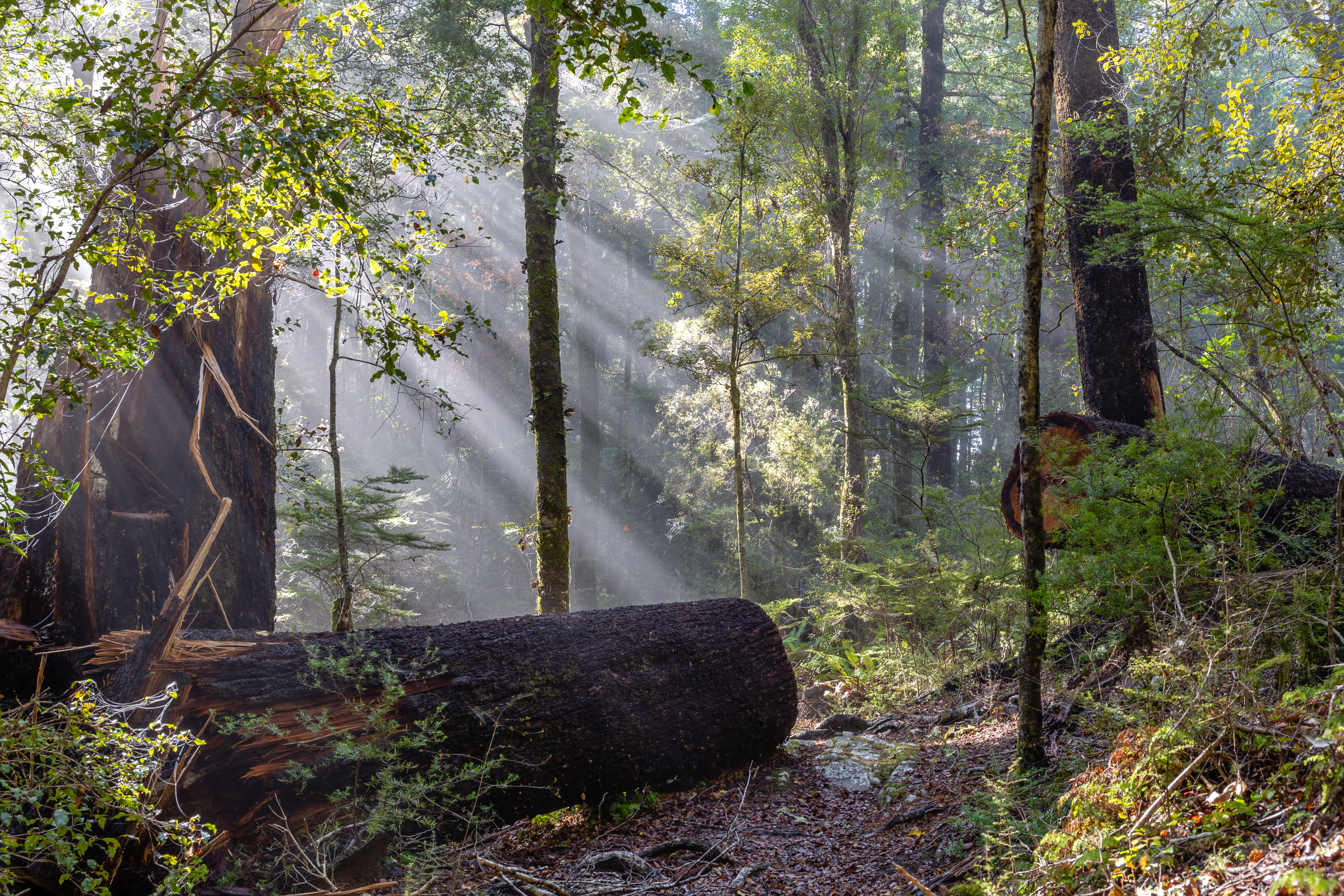
Te Araroa close to Rock Hut in the Bryant Range

The Bryant Range is a range of low mountains in the northern South Island of New Zealand. They form part of the boundary of the Nelson and Tasman Districts with Marlborough Region, as well as forming the western boundary of Mount Richmond Forest Park The range is traversed by State Highway 6 at the Rai Saddle close to its northern end.

The Bryant Range runs roughly northeast to southwest for some 35 kilometres, starting south of Delaware Bay and extending to its junction with the larger Richmond Range south of the town of Richmond. It is bounded in the east by the valleys of the Pelorus, Rai, and Ronga Rivers, and in the west by the Whangamoa River, Roding, and Teal Rivers. The range has several peaks over 1000 metres in height, notably Saddle Hill (1215m) and Mount Duppa (1133m).
