= Tinline River =

Coordinates: 41°19′S 173°30′E

Location
- Country: New Zealand

Physical characteristics
- Source
  - location: Bryant Range
- Mouth
  - location: Pelorus River
- Length: 12 km (7.5 mi)

The Tinline River is a river of the Marlborough Region of New Zealand's South Island. It flows generally south from its sources at the northern end of the Bryant Range to reach the Pelorus River seven kilometres west of Pelorus Bridge. The river is named after the 19th-century Scots-born New Zealand surveyor and philanthropist John Tinline and commemorates the discovery of a route from Nelson to the Wairau.

== See also ==
- List of rivers of New Zealand
