= Alexander Borthwick Murray =

Australian politician

Alexander Murray
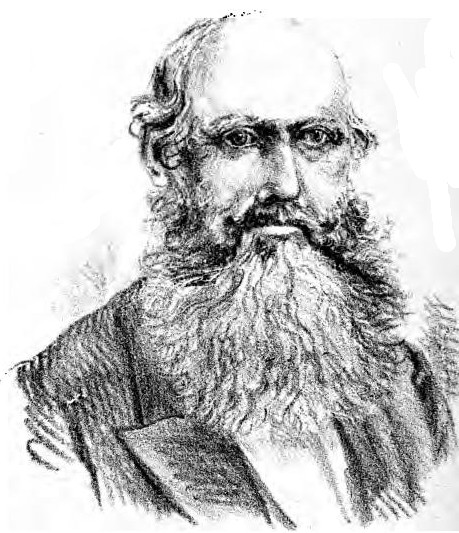
- Born: 14 February 1816; Dumfries and Galloway
- Died: 17 March 1903 (aged 87)
- Occupation: Sheep farmer
- Spouses: Charlotte Murthwaite Scott (m. 1842) Margaret Tinline (m. 1857)
- Children: Eight

Member of the South Australian House of Assembly for Electoral district of Gumeracha
- In office 8 May 1862 – 27 June 1867 Serving with Arthur Blyth
- Preceded by: Alexander Hay
- Succeeded by: Alexander Hay

Member of the South Australian Legislative Council
- In office March 1869 – February 1877
- In office July 1880 – 14 April 1888

Alexander Borthwick Murray (14 February 1816 – 17 March 1903) was an Australian sheep breeder and parliamentarian in the early days of South Australia. He married his business partner Margaret Tinline after they had established a successful sheep business.

== History ==
Murray was born at Langshall Burn, in the parish of Eskdalemuir, Dumfriesshire, Scotland. After spending six years acclimatizing Cheviot sheep to the highlands of Inverness and Ross-shire he emigrated as a full fare-paying passenger in the Lady Lillford to South Australia, arriving at Holdfast Bay on 27 September 1839.

He was contracted by Sir James Malcolm, a distant relative, to assist his eldest son William Oliver Malcolm (died 19 August 1865) in the care of sheep on his Barossa property, where he worked for fifteen months with considerable success, got them into such fine order that they took a prize at the first pastoral show in South Australia. This exhibition was held at the Horseshoe (Noarlunga), under the auspices of the South Australian Company. In 1842 he married Charlotte Murthwaite Scott in Sydney, and on his return with his new wife and her sister (who later married brother P. M. Murray), began wheat farming on the property "Murray Vale" he had purchased by special survey at Mount Crawford. His efforts were met with problems of smut, cost of transport to the mill at Kent Town, and low prices brought about by the then recession, and he decided wheat farming was not for him. The sheep, cattle and horses he bred at Murray Vale were successfully exhibited at country shows.

In partnership with his sister-in-law (afterwards Mrs. P. M. Murray), Murray purchased merino ewes and a ram from Duncan McFarlane, of Mount Barker which had been bred in New South Wales by James and Duncan McFarlane. These sheep formed the nucleus of the celebrated Murray flocks. His brother, John Murray, who arrived in South Australia on 5 September 1841, purchased part of his brother's land in the Barossa and half of his brother's share of the livestock.

A special survey taken out by Robert Cock was stocked with sheep by Murray, Cock and John Warren, and met with considerable success.

Murray subsequently founded a cattle station near Warrina, west of Lake Eyre, and another at Bookpurnong, on the River Murray, which he purchased from Richard Holland of Turretfield. This station was only profitable for a few years before it was overrun with rabbits and he never renewed the lease.

Murray ran sheep on Myrtle Springs and, in partnership with Leonard G. Browne (who for many years owned Buckland Park Estate), one at Leigh's Creek, but lost money prospecting for water, relinquished his interest in these properties. He decided against further investment in the north of the state, a finding later codified as the Goyder Line.

He and John Howard Angas formed a partnership A. B. Goyder and Co. which invested in land including the Reedy Creek survey and developed the Tungkillo area of Mount Crawford. On 1 November 1859 they dissolved the partnership and sold off their entire stock and properties (freehold, leasehold, special survey and rights of pasturage) at Tungkillo as well as Pernong (Purnong) and other squatting properties on the River Murray. This may be seen as a consolidation on Murray's part, as he soon purchased a number of newly released blocks in the Tungkillo region.

He was a member of the Agricultural and Horticultural Society and its president from 1866 to 1867. At the "Grand General Show" held during the visit of Prince Alfred, Duke of Edinburgh in November 1867, his entries "scooped the pool" of prizes for merino sheep.

From around 1883 to March 1898 Murray was a director of Elder's Wool and Produce Company (afterwards Elder Smith & Co Ltd).

== Recognition ==
His portrait by Andrew MacCormac was praised.

== Public life ==
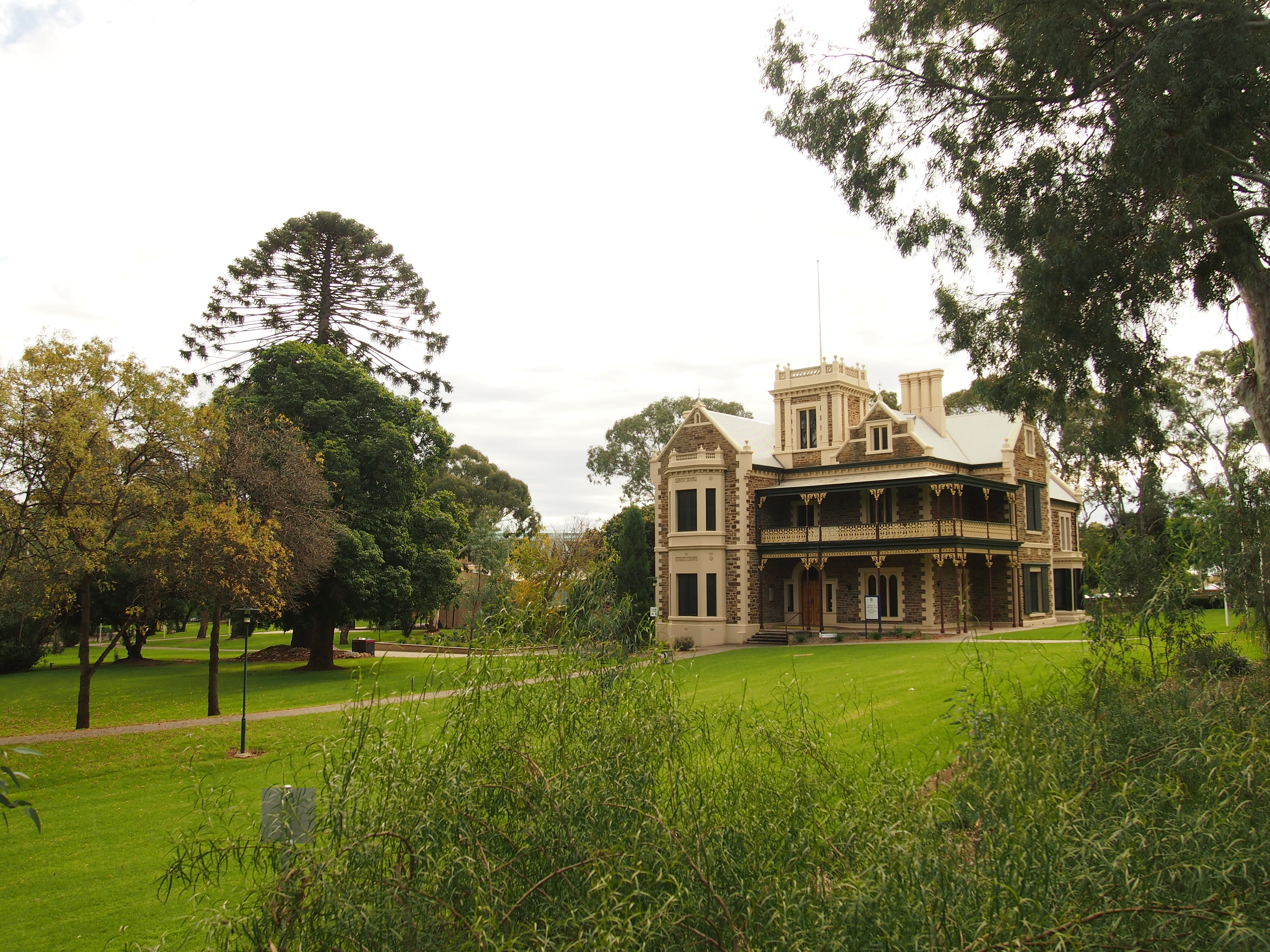
Murray House and landscaped grounds, formerly 'Murray Park', now part of UniSA Magill Campus

In 1850 he was one of the many who supported South Australian Register editor John Stephens who was being attacked for his outspoken criticism of some influential people.

In 1851 he was appointed to the District Road Commission for the Hundred of Para Wirra, the precursor of the District Council of Tungkillo, of which he was one of the original councillors and for some time chairman.

Murray supported compulsory implementation the Real Property Act (Torrens Title), as a way of depriving usurious lawyers of a source of unearned revenue.

In April 1862, he was elected to the House of Assembly for the District of Gumeracha at the by-election brought about by the retirement of the Hon. Alexander Hay, so was one of those named in the reformed List of Justice of the Peace. He was reelected at the 1862 general election and again in 1865.

In March 1869 he was elected to the Legislative Council and retained his seat till February 1877. He reentered the Legislative Council in July 1880, which he held until 14 April 1888, when he retired to his home, 'Murray Park', at Magill and was appointed Justice of the Peace.

== Family ==
He had three brothers who spent some time in Australia: John Murray (who arrived in 1843 and was responsible for much improvement in merino breeding), Pulteney Malcolm Murray (c. 1818 – 10 November 1879), and William Murray (c. 1820 – 18 October 1901), jam manufacturer of Sea View, Glen Osmond, whose daughter Esther Tinline Murray married George Swan Fowler.

In 1842 he married Charlotte Murthwaite Scott (c. 1817 – 26 May 1853); they had two sons and one daughter

- Alexander Scott Murray (c. 1846 – August 1880) married Elizabeth Helen Ferguson ( – ) in 1874. A monument to his memory was erected in Wirrabara. Elizabeth was a daughter of William Ferguson, one of the earliest settlers of S.A.
- Esther "Ettie" Murray (1847–1930) married railway engineer Peter Galt (c. 1835 – 28 March 1883) on 9 November 1871
- John Murray (1849–1885) married Elizabeth Thomson Melrose, daughter of George Melrose of Mount Pleasant, on 29 November 1877.

- Sir John Stanley Murray (1884–1971) married (Winifred) Olive Wigg ( –1964) on 8 June 1910.

On 23 June 1857 he married Margaret Tinline, the sister of (John and) George Tinline (c. 1816 – 1 February 1895), of the Bank of South Australia, fellow parliamentarian and for a time his business partner. They had eight children including:

- Margaret Tinline Murray (20 May 1858 – 9 March 1936)
- (Pulteney) Malcolm Borthwick Murray (c. 1860 – 10 April 1900) married Rebecca Vera "Bec" Brown (died 11 May 1926) in 1888; lived at Wirrabara. "Bec" was a sister of Alice Yvonne Budd.
- Sir George John Robert Murray KCMG (27 September 1863 – 18 February 1942), solicitor and Chief Justice, Lieutenant Governor and Chancellor of the University of Adelaide.
- Charlotte Mary Murray (1867 – 15 September 1920) married Frank H(agger) Downer (18 October 1863 – 19 March 1938) on 8 August 1900.
