= Ronga River =

Coordinates: 41°13′S 173°36′E

Location
- Country: New Zealand

Physical characteristics
- Mouth
  - location: Rai River
- Length: 10 km (6.2 mi)

The Ronga River is a river of the Marlborough Region of New Zealand's South Island. Although its source is on a ridge only 3 kilometres (2 mi) from the island's north coast, the river flows south, reaching the Rai River close to the township of Rai Valley after a 10-km journey.
