= William Murray (gardener) =

William Murray (28 December 1819 – 18 October 1901) was a pioneering gardener of South Australia.

== History ==
William, a professional gardener, was a native of Dumfriesshire, Scotland who emigrated to South Australia on the City of Adelaide, arriving in September 1841, following brothers Alexander Borthwick Murray and Pulteney Malcolm Murray who arrived in 1839 on the Lady Lilford. Another brother John Murray (who was responsible for much of the improvement in merino breeding) also emigrated, either in 1841 or 1843.

He lived at Magill for about twelve months, then in 1842 moved to Myrtle Bank, where he planted out that and the Ridge Park garden, where the first olives were grown, and from which he extracted about 40 imperial gallons (180 L) of oil in 1857. Around 1847 he purchased part of Glenunga Estate, where he conducted a nursery business.

He was appointed first Conservator of Forests in South Australia, and established the Bundaleer Forest Nursery in January 1876. He resigned, under pressure from the Forestry Board, ten months later. He introduced the bamboo system of planting forest trees.

He founded Murray's Jam Factory on Glen Osmond Road, Glen Osmond.

He was a prominent member of the Flinders street Presbyterian Church.

He was a member of the RAHSSA for a number of years and elected a Life Member in October 1901. He was a frequent contributor to Farm and Garden.

== Family ==
His brother Alexander Borthwick Murray married Margaret Tinline, sister of George Tinline and John Tinline, on 23 June 1857.

- daughter Margaret Tinline Murray (ca.1859 – 9 March 1936) of Murray Park, Magill.

William Murray married Jane Wright in 1846; lived at "Sea View", Glen Osmond

- third daughter Esther Tinline Murray married James Richard Fowler, M.A. (Oxford) (25 May 1865 – 17 December 1939), son of George Swan Fowler on 17 November 1892.
- fifth son Alexander married Marion Crawford on 10 November 1881

== Sources ==
Gill, Thomas (1849–1923) The History and Topography of Glen Osmond 1905.

Facsimile edition pub. State Library of South Australia 1974 ISBN 0 7243 0035 X
