= Rainy River (Marlborough) =

Coordinates: 41°19′39″S 173°30′46″E

Location
- Country: New Zealand

Physical characteristics
- Source
  - elevation: 790 metres (2,590 ft)
- Mouth
  - location: Pelorus River
  - elevation: 40 metres (130 ft)
- Length: 5 km (3.1 mi)

The Rainy River is a short river of the northeastern Marlborough Region of New Zealand's South Island. The 790-metre Rainy flows north from the Richmond Range into the Pelorus River, which it reaches five kilometres west of Pelorus Bridge.
