= D. & J. Fowler Ltd. =

Former wholesale grocery company in Adelaide, South Australia

D. & J. Fowler Ltd. was a wholesale grocery company in Adelaide, South Australia. It was founded as a retail establishment by David Fowler in 1854, before becoming a leading wholesale and indenting firm in the colony of South Australia. They were the creators and owners of the well-known Lion brand, which included confectionery, flour, coffee, canned fruit and other goods; "Lion" brand flour endures, under different ownership, today. The firm's interests and holdings were extensive, including the Adelaide Milling Company (purchased 1895), Adelaide Bottle Company (1912), the Robur Tea Company (1928), and others.

D. & J. Fowler Ltd. was taken over by the Adelaide-based Southern Farmers Ltd in 1982/83.

== History ==
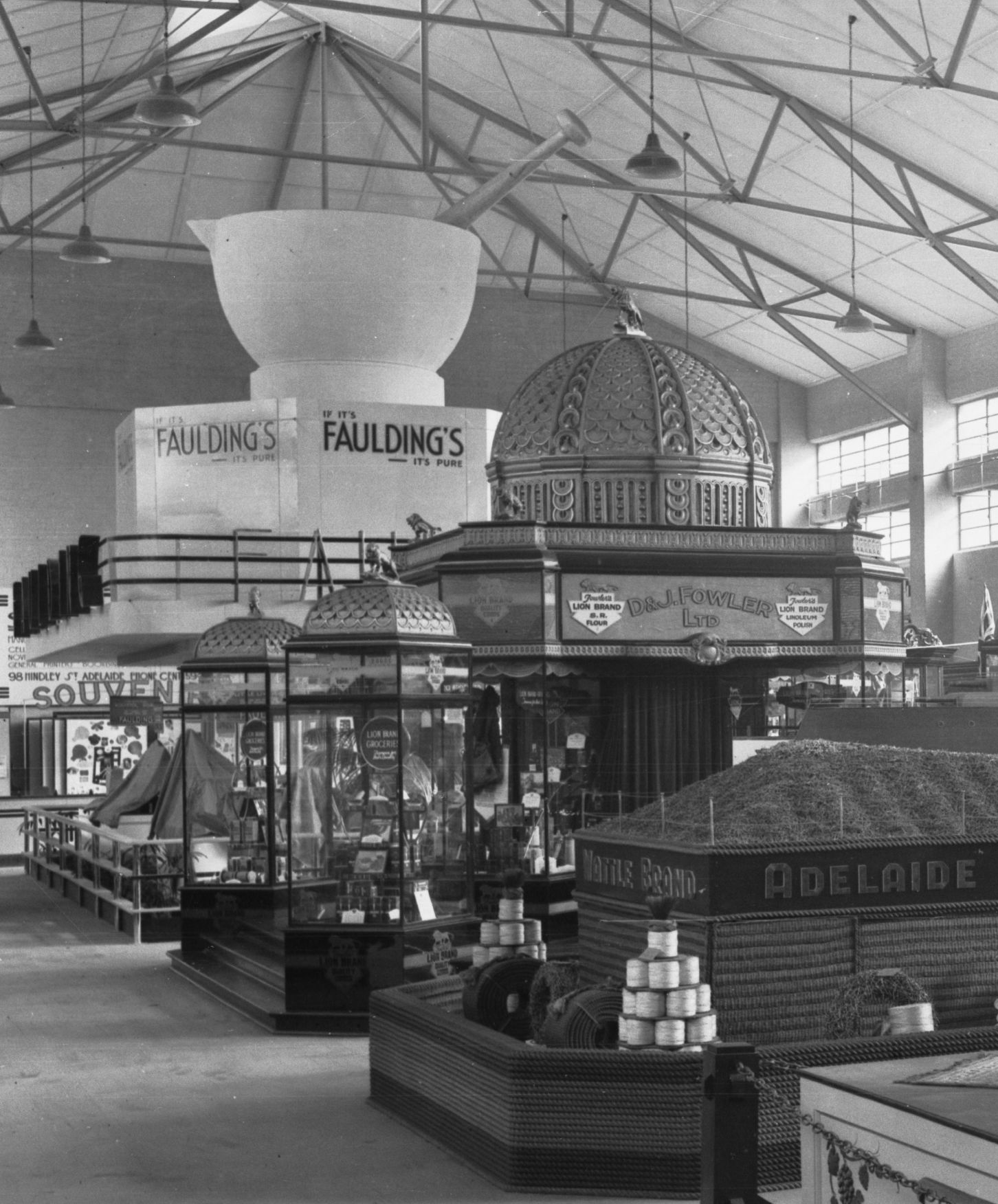
Centenary Exhibition at Centennial Hall in Wayville showing food produce, ca. 1936

The company was founded by two brothers born in Kilrenny, Fife, Scotland, sons of James Fowler (c. 1794 – 9 December 1872), who kept a general store in Anstruther or Cellardyke in Fifeshire. James Fowler (c. 1830 – 13 February 1858) and his sister Margaret migrated to South Australia on the Anna Maria, arriving in November 1850. With financial assistance from his father, he opened a grocery store in Rundle Street near Pulteney Street. He was joined by elder brother David (1826 – 11 November 1881), who arrived aboard Fop Smit in 1854. Shortly afterwards they moved operations to 54 King William Street on a 14 months' lease. James, who was responsible for all the book-keeping, died in 1858 after a long period of ill-health. The third brother George Swan Fowler, who had been associated with their father's business, emigrated shortly after, arriving in Adelaide by the steamer Indus in July 1860 with sister Margaret, who had returned to Scotland after the death of James. He was made a partner in the firm, while retaining the name of D. & J. Fowler. In 1863 they purchased the King William Street premises they had been renting. By 1865 business had grown to such an extent that they opened a branch office in London, run by David, and a new head office building, completed in 1867, in King William Street, of which George had control. In 1865 they divested themselves of the retail side of the business, selling it to Finlayson & Co. (employees William Finlayson jun. and George Brookman).

In 1873 they took over rented premises at McLaren Wharf, Port Adelaide, along with two warehouses on Vincent Street, but these proved inadequate and in 1881 a large warehouse was built on Santo Parade, opposite New Dock, with storage for 30,000 tons of merchandise.

Later timber merchant and then furniture retailer Malcolm Reid had his first job at the firm.

In 1879 G. Fowler Stewart, a nephew, started work at the London office, started at the Adelaide office in 1881 and retired in 1914.

Branches were opened in Fremantle, where Fowler's Warehouse is a local landmark, Broken Hill and Kalgoorlie. They acquired the dealership for Shell products and set up a shipping agency to handle not only their imports but exports of wool, wheat, meat, flour butter and other materials.

=== Manufacturing ===
When the South Australian Government adopted a protectionist policy around 1880, the management of D. & J. Fowler Limited, decided to begin manufacturing groceries.

Around 1882 Fowlers contracted farmers in the south-east of South Australia to grow chicory, which would be used to make "Lion" brand coffee and chicory essence.

They built the "Paou Chung Factory" on King William Road, and in 1883 their "Paou Chung" brand was the first packaged tea marketed in South Australia. Their best-selling line, "Amgoorie" tea, followed much later, in 1896.

Around 1885 John H. M. Hawkes was appointed manager of the manufacturing side of their Adelaide business, with a staff of eight.

They took over Barnfield & Turner's "London Condiment Company" at Phillis Street Maylands and H. B. Hanton's in Fullarton, renamed it the "Lion Preserving Company" and expanded their range of canned fruits, jams and pickles. A new factory for "Lion" canned fruit was set up at Nuriootpa (later sold to R. McEwin and Sons of "Glen Ewin" fame). They took over the factory of Henry Harford (c. 1834 – 7 July 1886) in Mill Street, Adelaide, which became the Lion Confectionery Works.

They took over the bankrupt Adelaide Milling Company's flour mill in 1895, Adelaide Bottle Company (1912), the Robur Tea Company (1928), and many others.

Other items they produced were "Maori" and "Clan" brands of oatmeal.

In 1888 a fish preserving factory was set up in Port Lincoln, but was relinquished three years later, having found the unreliability of supply made the business unworkable.

=== "Lion Factory" ===
A new building, the "Lion Factory", where their "Lion" brand of self-raising flour and other goods were packaged, was opened on North Terrace in 1907.

The building was refurbished and converted in the 1980s and early 1990s, to be used as a music venue and arts centre, and in 1992 renamed the Lion Arts Centre.

=== Management changes ===
David died in England in 1881, leaving George as the senior partner.

In 1899 D & J Fowler was converted to a limited liability company, with 2,000 shares being allocated to the firm's employees, held by three trustees. James Robert Fowler was the company's first chairman of directors, retiring in 1932, succeeded by W. Murray Fowler.

In 1982-3 the company was taken over by Southern Farmers Ltd.

== The family ==
James Fowler (c. 1794 – 9 December 1872), store owner of Anstruther, Scotland had three sons:

- David Fowler (1826 – 11 November 1881) married Janet ( – 22 June 1899), perhaps around 1850. Among their children were:

- James Fowler (c. 1860 – 5 December 1916) married Mary Harriet Morgan ( – 14 November 1915) youngest daughter of Sir William Morgan on 17 June 1891
- Grace Fowler married Dr. Carl Roder on 13 April 1881

- James Fowler (c. 1830 – 13 February 1858)
- George Swan Fowler (9 March 1839 – 1 October 1896) married Janet "Catherine" Lamb (c. 1839 – 7 April 1922) on 1 June 1864. Among their children were:

- James Richard Fowler M.A. (25 May 1865 – 17 December 1939) married Esther Tinline Murray on 17 November 1892. Esther was third daughter of William Murray (c. 1820 – 18 October 1901) of "Sea View", Glen Osmond. Purchased "Sunnyside" from Milne estate in 1895.

- W(illiam) Murray Fowler (26 August 1895 – ) married Florence Lorna Borradaile Richardson. As Major Fowler he was awarded the Military Medal during World War I.

- David Murray Fowler (3 June 1922 – ) was RAAF pilot during World War II.
- John Murray Fowler (6 April 1928 – ) was advertising manager, 5AD in 1958, later director, Television Broadcasters Ltd. then general manager, Reg Grundy Productions (1976– )

- Marion Anderson Fowler ( – 5 August 1947) married Ernest Allnutt on 5 October 1893
- Laura Margaret Fowler M.B., Ch.B. (3 May 1868 – September 1952) married Charles (Henry) Standish Hope B.A., M.D., Ch.B. on 4 July 1893. Laura, later to become a noted missionary in India, was in 1893 the first female to graduate in medicine and surgery from the University of Adelaide.
- David Fowler (9 April 1870 – 12 May 1932) married Kitty Martin. He was actively involved in gold extraction from tailings using the Macarthur Forrest cyanide process, and was head of David Fowler Ltd., Durban, South Africa, where he died.

== See also ==
- G. Wood, Son & Co. (contemporary wholesale grocers in Adelaide)
- Lion Arts Centre (for info on the North Terrace Lion's Factory building)
