= G. Fowler Stewart =

George Fowler Stewart (1861 – 3 January 1917), generally known as Fowler Stewart, was a Scots-born businessman and public figure in Adelaide, South Australia.

== History ==
Stewart was the youngest son of Charles Stewart, a prominent manufacturer of Kirkcaldy, Fifeshire, Scotland, and was educated at a college in Edinburgh. In 1879 he started work at the London office of D. & J. Fowler founded by his uncles David, James and (later) George Fowler. In 1881 he was sent to Adelaide to learn the business there, and in 1887 took over management of the Fremantle, Western Australia branch. He spent several years travelling the world, returned to Adelaide in 1889 and in 1890 married Laura Hill, youngest daughter of William Hill. When D & J Fowler was floated as a public company, Stewart was sent to London as a Director. He returned to Adelaide in 1901 and in 1914 retired from the Company.

He died suddenly at home as a result of a heart attack.

== Other interests ==
Stewart was

- prominent in the establishment of the Australian Dried Fruit Association and its first secretary.
- one of the original members of the Federation League, an early promoter of Federation of Australia.
- chairman of the joint council of the Australasian National League and Farmers' and Producers' Political Union, which, with the Liberal and Democratic Union, founded the Liberal Union of South Australia.
- president of the Torrens electoral committee, president of the Glenelg branch, and a member of the council and State executive of the Liberal Union.
- an active member of the South Australian Caledonian Society and its Chief in 1902.
- a member of the Glenelg Town Council in 1905
- a member of the South Australian Literary Societies' Union and its president in 1906. He was at one time treasurer of the Union Parliament associated with that body.

== Family ==
Stewart married Laura Hill (1863–1957) on 26 June 1890. Laura was a granddaughter of John Dunn of Mount Barker.

- Helen Fowler Stewart (8 April 1891 – 1980) married Valentine Zerbini Alderman of Glenelg on 9 October 1917
- William Hill Dunn Stewart (3 October 1895 – )
- Charles Gordon Stewart (20 October 1903 – 1968) married Mary Frewin Hancock on 10 December 1936, lived at Langkoop, Victoria

They had a home "Waldo", Glenelg; later "Waldo", Kensington Gardens
