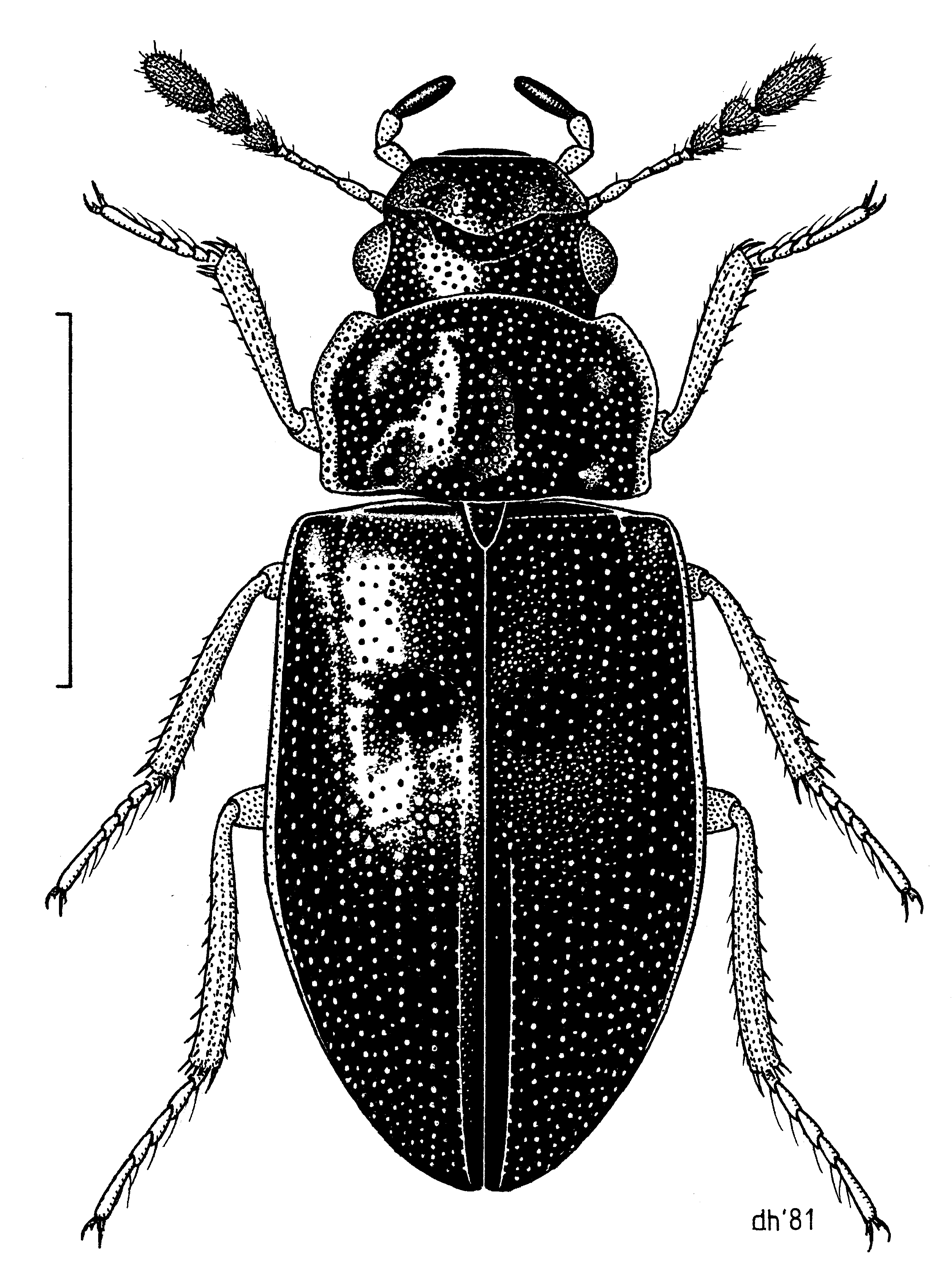

Conservation status
- Nationally Endangered (NZ TCS)

Scientific classification
- Kingdom: Animalia
- Phylum: Arthropoda
- Class: Insecta
- Order: Coleoptera
- Suborder: Polyphaga
- Infraorder: Staphyliniformia
- Family: Hydrophilidae
- Genus: Horelophus
- Species: H. walkeri

Binomial name
- Horelophus walkeri D'Orchymont, 1913 Locations of Horelophus walkeri in New Zealand

= Horelophus walkeri =

Species of beetle

Horelophus walkeri is a small water scavenger beetle that is endemic to New Zealand. It is found in the South Island in the West Coast, Nelson, Buller and Marlborough regions. The preferred habitat of this species are the moss and crevices within the splash zone of waterfalls sourced from fast flowing, clear, cool waterways. The larvae of this species are carnivorous while the adults are herbivores or scavengers. In 2012 the Department of Conservation classified this beetle as Nationally Endangered.

== Description ==
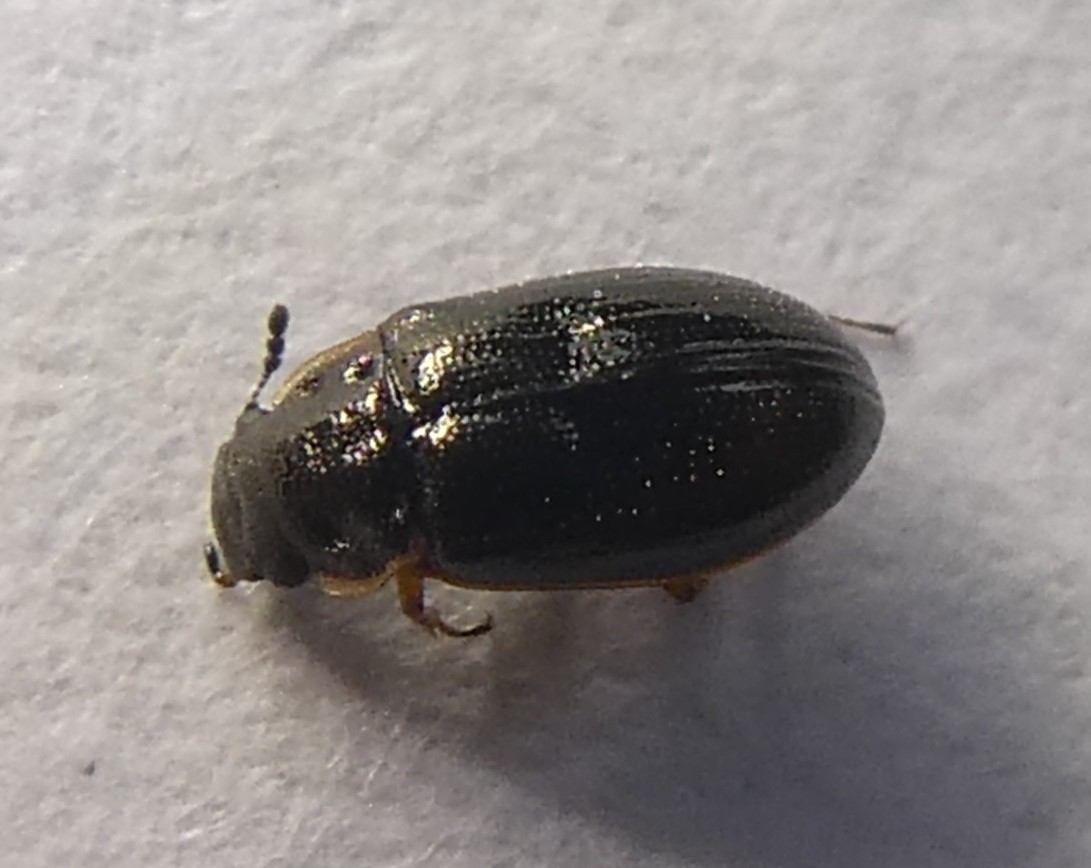
Horelophus walkeri

This species was first described in 1913 by Armand d'Orchymont from two specimens collected in Reefton, New Zealand. The beetle is 2.1–3.1 mm long with a glossy brown to black body. The pronotum and elytra have translucent pale brown margins. Its small eyes are pale and protrude from its head. Its head, pronotum and elytra are covered in small and shallow punctures. The elytra have a distinctive depression. This species, was thought to have primitive characteristics, and originally placed in its own subfamily of Horelophinae. More recently, it was placed within the tribe Anacaenini, though H. walkeri remains the only species within the genus Horelophus

== Distribution and habitat ==
Specimens have been collected from waterfalls at sunny sites in Nelson, Buller and Marlborough. Sites in Marlborough include Dead Horse Creek, near Canvastown and tributaries of the Pelorus River, near Pelorus Bridge. In Nelson, this beetle has been collected from Deepwater Creek, near Lyell and catchments flowing into the Wangapeka and Owen Rivers. All locations were waterways that were fast flowing, clear and cool. The riverbeds consisted of fine sedimentary rocks. The locations mostly have open canopies among beech forest. Horelophus walkeri can be found on wet rocks or hiding within moss, crevices and shaded areas within the spray zone of a waterfall. Commonly, it is found walking on wet rocks, rather than submerged like water scavenger beetles that live in similar habitats.

== Behaviour ==
This species hides within moss and crevices in the splash zones of small waterfalls. It is likely that they feed on algae on the smooth and wet rock surfaces in these locations. Whilst adult water scavenger beetles are normally herbivores or scavengers, larvae are carnivorous. Considering that they are not found at sites with closed canopies, it is likely that they use polarised light, reflecting from the surfaces of rocks under waterfalls for finding suitable locations. Their long wings indicate that they are capable of flight.

== Conservation ==
Few collections had been made of this species until 2012. Surveys for this species may assist in understanding its specific habitat requirements. Currently, it has not been located in any river catchments in Nelson City, indicating that populations may not be sustained in urban environments. In 2012, Horelophus walkeri was added to the list of nationally endangered beetles in New Zealand.
