= Moenui =

- Interactive map of Moenui
- Coordinates: 41°16′39″S 173°47′49″E
- Country: New Zealand
- Region: Marlborough
- Ward: Marlborough Sounds General Ward; Marlborough Māori Ward
- Electorates: Kaikōura; Te Tai Tonga (Māori)

Government
  - Territorial Authority: Marlborough District Council
  - Marlborough District Mayor: Nadine Taylor
  - Kaikōura MP: Stuart Smith
  - Te Tai Tonga MP: Tākuta Ferris

Area
  - Total: 26.66 km^{2} (10.29 sq mi)

Population (2023 census)
  - Total: 222
  - Density: 8.33/km^{2} (21.6/sq mi)

Moenui is a small settlement 3 km east of Havelock in the South Island of New Zealand. It is situated on the shores of the Mahikipawa arm of the Mahau Sound - one of the many sounds in the Marlborough Sounds. The meaning of Moenui is "Big Sleep".

== Demographics ==
Moenui locality covers 26.66 km^{2} (10.29 sq mi). It is part of the larger Marlborough Sounds East statistical area.

Historical population
Year	Pop.	±% p.a.
2006	177	—
2013	174	−0.24%
2018	213	+4.13%
2023	222	+0.83%

Moenui had a population of 222 in the 2023 New Zealand census, an increase of 9 people (4.2%) since the 2018 census, and an increase of 48 people (27.6%) since the 2013 census. There were 108 males and 114 females in 108 dwellings. The median age was 60.4 years (compared with 38.1 years nationally). There were 24 people (10.8%) aged under 15 years, 12 (5.4%) aged 15 to 29, 111 (50.0%) aged 30 to 64, and 75 (33.8%) aged 65 or older.

People could identify as more than one ethnicity. The results were 94.6% European (Pākehā), 5.4% Māori, 1.4% Pasifika, 1.4% Asian, and 8.1% other, which includes people giving their ethnicity as "New Zealander". English was spoken by 98.6%, Māori by 1.4%, and other languages by 8.1%. No language could be spoken by 1.4% (e.g. too young to talk). The percentage of people born overseas was 23.0, compared with 28.8% nationally.

Religious affiliations were 31.1% Christian, and 1.4% Buddhist. People who answered that they had no religion were 60.8%, and 6.8% of people did not answer the census question.

Of those at least 15 years old, 51 (25.8%) people had a bachelor's or higher degree, 114 (57.6%) had a post-high school certificate or diploma, and 39 (19.7%) people exclusively held high school qualifications. The median income was $33,200, compared with $41,500 nationally. 9 people (4.5%) earned over $100,000 compared to 12.1% nationally. The employment status of those at least 15 was 78 (39.4%) full-time and 45 (22.7%) part-time.
