= Teal River =

Coordinates: 41°14′S 173°24′E

Location
- Country: New Zealand

Physical characteristics
- Mouth
  - location: Wakapuaka River
- Length: 9 km (5.6 mi)

The Teal River is a river of the Nelson Region of New Zealand's South Island. It flows north from its origins in hilly country to the west of the city of Nelson to reach the Wakapuaka River.

== See also ==
- List of rivers of New Zealand
