= Wakapuaka River =

Coordinates: 41°11′S 173°25′E

Location
- Country: New Zealand

Physical characteristics
- Mouth
  - location: Delaware Bay
- Length: 15 km (9 mi)
- Basin size: 6,500 ha (16,000 acres)

The Wakapuaka River is a river of the Nelson Region of New Zealand's South Island. It flows generally north from its origins in the north of the Bryant Range 14 kilometres (8.7 mi) east of Nelson city centre to reach Delaware Bay, an indentation in the northeast coast of Tasman Bay / Te Tai-o-Aorere. The catchment area is 6,500 ha (16,000 acres).

The main tributaries of the Wakapuaka River are the Lud River and Teal River.

== Fishing ==
The Wakapuaka River is a popular fishing setting. Due to heavy fishing, visitors are limited to only two bags of fish per trip. Fishing season is from 1 October to 30 April. Twelve species of freshwater fish inhabit the area. These are the longfin eel, shortfin eel, common bully, redfin bully, giant bully, upland bully, inanga (also known as common galaxias), koaro (also known as climbing galaxias), brown trout, torrentfish, cockabully, and freshwater crayfish.

== See also ==
- List of rivers of New Zealand
