= Pelorus Bridge =

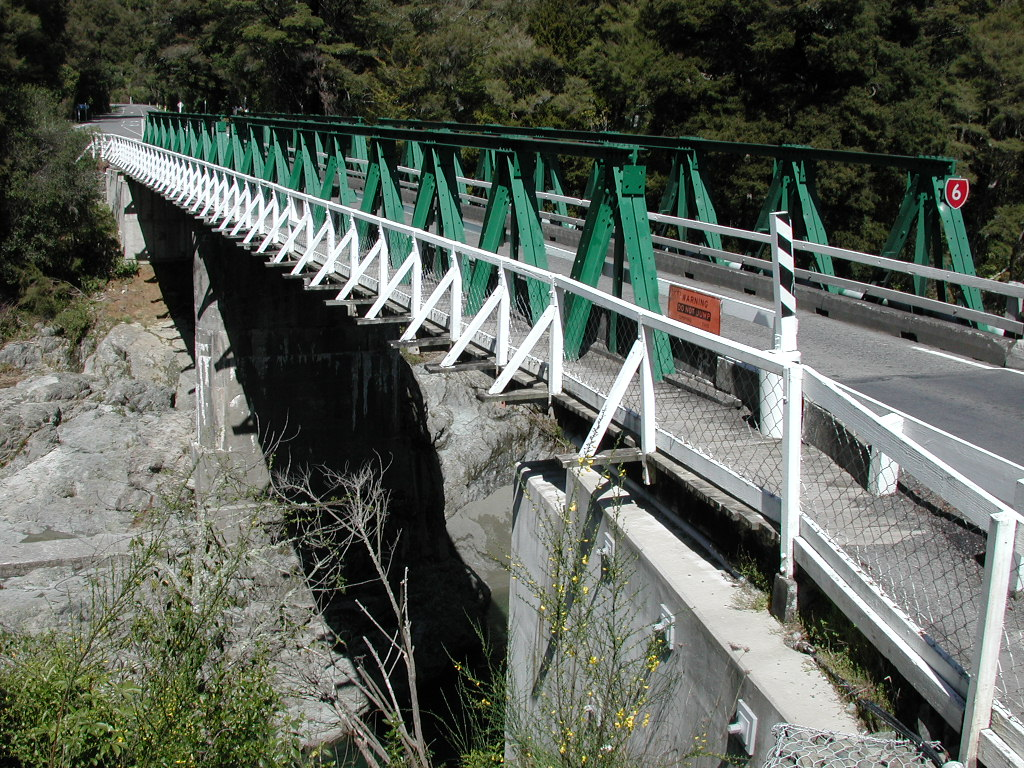
- Interactive map of Pelorus Bridge
- Coordinates: 41°17′53″S 173°34′19″E
- Country: New Zealand
- Region: Marlborough
- Ward: Marlborough Sounds General Ward; Marlborough Māori Ward
- Electorates: Kaikōura; Te Tai Tonga (Māori)

Government
  - Territorial Authority: Marlborough District Council
  - Marlborough District Mayor: Nadine Taylor
  - Kaikōura MP: Stuart Smith
  - Te Tai Tonga MP: Tākuta Ferris

Area
  - Total: 641.28 km^{2} (247.60 sq mi)

Population (2023 census)
  - Total: 294
  - Density: 0.458/km^{2} (1.19/sq mi)

Pelorus Bridge is a tiny locality in Marlborough, in New Zealand's South Island, where the Rai River meets Pelorus River. State Highway 6 crosses the Pelorus River at Pelorus Bridge Scenic Reserve, which was used as one of the film locations for The Hobbit: The Desolation of Smaug.

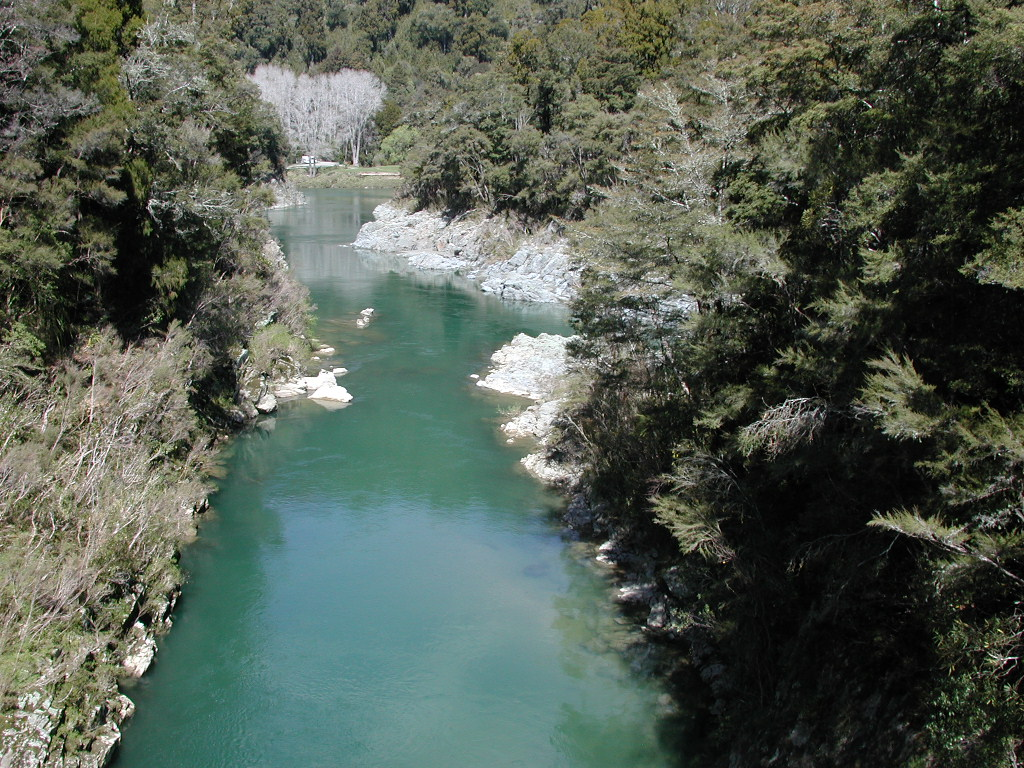
Rai River and Pelorus River viewed from the pedestrian suspension bridge

The scenic reserve contains one of the last stands of original river flat forest in the area. The forest contains a mixture of beech and other broadleaf species, as well as mature podocarps such as rimu, kahikatea and tōtara towering over the canopy. Several easy walking tracks connect the camping ground, picnic site, river, and the carparks. A circular walk leads over a pedestrian suspension bridge on the Rai River.

The closest small towns are Rai Valley 7 km to the north, and Canvastown 8 km to the east. A cafe is situated at the Pelorus Bridge Scenic Reserve.

== History ==
The first Pelorus Bridge was built in 1863. Since 1885, when a second bridge was built, the route between Nelson and the Wairau Valley followed the course of the present road. The Pelorus Valley was forested until the early 1880s. From 1881 until the early 20th century, most of the lowland forest was milled. In 1865, a township was planned for the area at Pelorus Bridge, however, the plans were delayed in 1912 and the area eventually became a scenic reserve.

Pelorus Bridge School opened in 1911 and closed in 1943.

== Demographics ==
Pelorus Bridge locality covers 641.28 km^{2} (247.60 sq mi). It is part of the larger Marlborough Sounds West statistical area.

Historical population
Year	Pop.	±% p.a.
2006	216	—
2013	243	+1.70%
2018	276	+2.58%
2023	294	+1.27%

Pelorus Bridge had a population of 294 in the 2023 New Zealand census, an increase of 18 people (6.5%) since the 2018 census, and an increase of 51 people (21.0%) since the 2013 census. There were 141 males and 150 females in 129 dwellings. There were 48 people (16.3%) aged under 15 years, 36 (12.2%) aged 15 to 29, 144 (49.0%) aged 30 to 64, and 63 (21.4%) aged 65 or older.

People could identify as more than one ethnicity. The results were 92.9% European (Pākehā); 10.2% Māori; 3.1% Pasifika; 1.0% Asian; and 3.1% Middle Eastern, Latin American and African New Zealanders (MELAA). English was spoken by 99.0%, Māori by 1.0%, and other languages by 7.1%. The percentage of people born overseas was 18.4, compared with 28.8% nationally.

Religious affiliations were 35.7% Christian, 1.0% Buddhist, and 1.0% other religions. People who answered that they had no religion were 54.1%, and 9.2% of people did not answer the census question.

Of those at least 15 years old, 30 (12.2%) people had a bachelor's or higher degree, 165 (67.1%) had a post-high school certificate or diploma, and 54 (22.0%) people exclusively held high school qualifications. 27 people (11.0%) earned over $100,000 compared to 12.1% nationally. The employment status of those at least 15 was 114 (46.3%) full-time, 45 (18.3%) part-time, and 3 (1.2%) unemployed.

== Vegetation and wildlife ==
The lowland forest at Pelorus Bridge consists of mature podocarps like rimu, kahikatea, miro, mataī and tōtara and black, hard, red and silver beech trees. Birds present include korimako, tūī, pīwakawaka and kererū. A population of long-tailed bats live in the forest. A rare and primitive beetle, Horelophus walkeri lives in the splash zone of waterfalls in the area.
