= Whangamoa River =

Coordinates: 41°06′S 173°32′E

Location
- Country: New Zealand

Physical characteristics
- Source
  - location: Bryant Range
- Mouth
  - location: Tasman Bay / Te Tai-o-Aorere
- Length: 22 km (14 mi)

The Whangamoa River is a river of the Nelson Region of New Zealand's South Island. It flows generally northeast from its origins in the northern Bryant Range 15 kilometres (9 mi) northeast of Nelson city centre to reach Tasman Bay / Te Tai-o-Aorere close to the northeastern end of Delaware Bay.

== See also ==
- List of rivers of New Zealand
