= George Tinline =

Australian politician

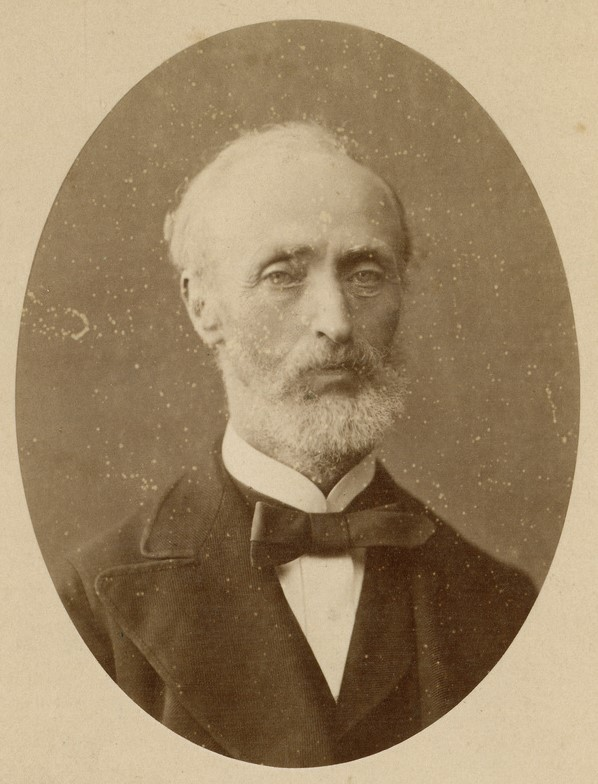
- Born: 28 October 1815; Jedburgh
- Died: 1895 (aged 79–80); Melbourne
- Occupation: Banker
- Employer: Bank of South Australia (1837)
- Known for: Creating 25,000 gold guinea coins
- Spouse: Helen Madder
- Children: 6
- Relatives: John Tinline

George Tinline (28 October 1815 – 4 February 1895) was a nineteenth-century South Australian banker and politician. Tinline made his fortune when the Bank of South Australia created 25,000 guinea coins solving a currency crisis caused by a gold rush.

== History ==
Tinline was born near Jedburgh, Scotland in 1815. His parents Esther (born Easton) and John were poor. On completing his education he worked for twelve years in the Jedburgh branch of the Bank of Scotland. In 1838 he emigrated to Sydney, Australia, where he was employed by the Bank of Australasia. He was transferred to the bank's Adelaide branch but soon left to be the Bank of South Australia's accountant at £400 a year. In January 1840 George's brother, John, arrived from Jedburgh. His brother was to live with the Maoris, to make his fortune sheep farming and to fund a park in Jedburgh. In 1860 the manager Stephens left for England, and George Tinline was appointed acting manager.

This was the time of the gold rush, and the Colony was beset with, apart from the shortage of workers, a financial crisis due to the sudden increase in the availability of gold and the lack of sufficient currency to pay for it. He pushed for the establishment of an assay office and mint, and the conversion of some of the diggers' gold to bullion which could be used as a form of currency. A Bullion Act was passed and some 25,000 £1 coins were minted, but were not recognized as legal currency by the Bank of England. In recognition of his work in staving off a crisis Tinline was awarded a purse of 2,000 guineas (£2,200; several millions of dollars in today's money), and an elaborate silver salver (now in the Art Gallery of South Australia), for his service to the business community.

He was sacked by the bank in 1859 after severe losses caused by a customer defaulting, and joined his brother in law A. B. Murray in developing a pastoral lease at Wirrabara.

He was one of the Lands Commissioners when he was elected in April 1860 to fill one of two vacancies in the Legislative Council, then created a vacancy when he abruptly retired to England in May 1863. The house which he had commissioned near the summit of Mount Lofty was sold, half completed, later to become Stawell School for Girls.

He paid a short visit to Adelaide in 1894 or 1895, and was in Melbourne when he died.

== Other interests ==
He had a financial interest in the Hindmarsh Brewery, whose management was for a few months known as "Crawford & Tinline" before becoming "Crawford & Sons".

== Family ==
George Tinline married Helen Madder (also of Jedburgh) on 30 November 1843. They lived on Stanley Street, North Adelaide and had six children.

His widowed father John Tinline (1791–1861) and George's sister Margaret Tinline (c. 1823 – 17 August 1907) arrived in South Australia aboard the Symmetry in February 1844) Margaret would marry Alexander Borthwick Murray on 23 June 1857 (his second wife).
