= Canvastown =

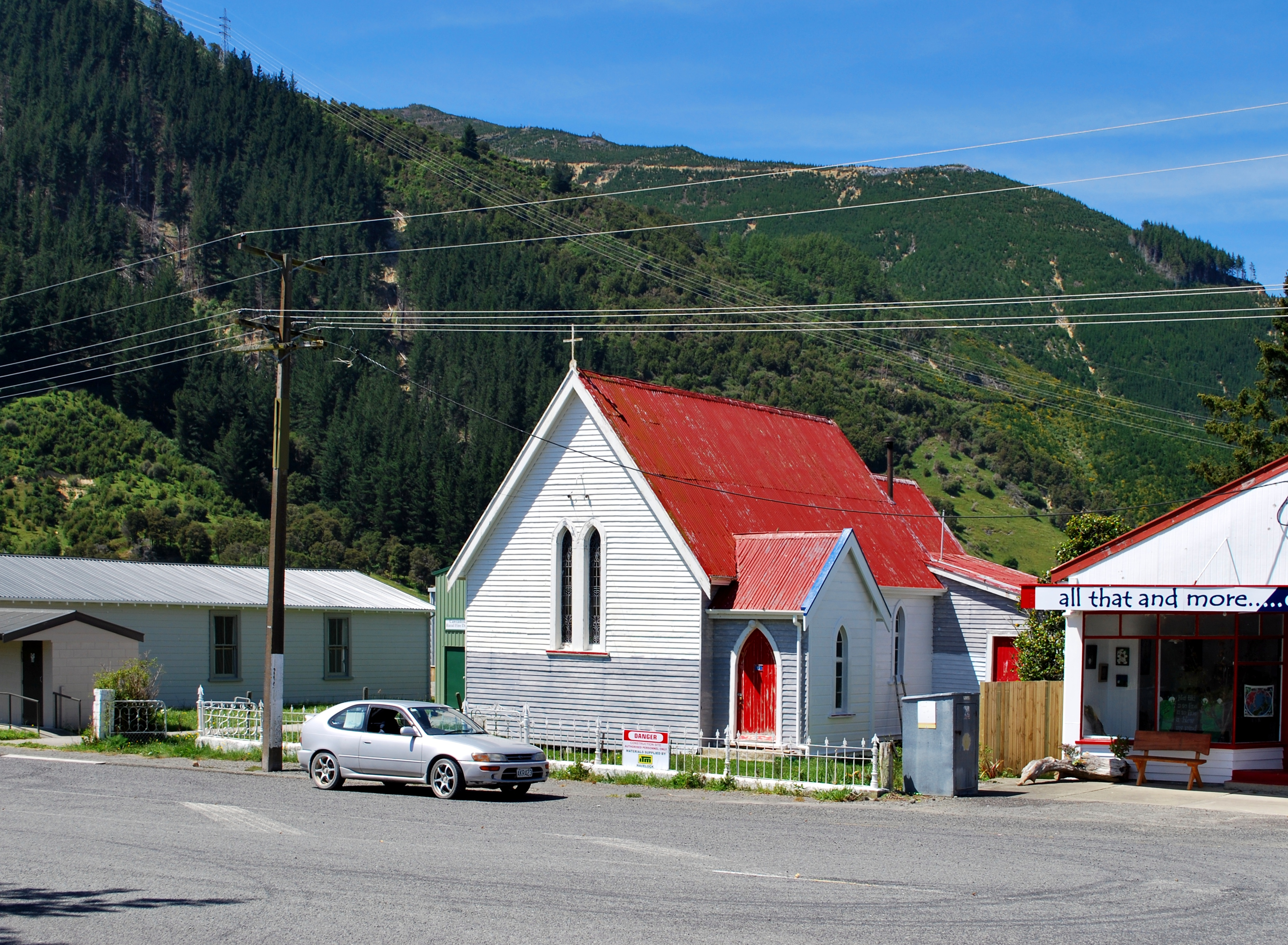
- Interactive map of Canvastown
- Coordinates: 41°17′26″S 173°40′13″E
- Country: New Zealand
- Region: Marlborough
- Ward: Marlborough Sounds General Ward; Marlborough Māori Ward
- Electorates: Kaikōura; Te Tai Tonga (Māori)

Government
  - Territorial Authority: Marlborough District Council
  - Marlborough District Mayor: Nadine Taylor
  - Kaikōura MP: Stuart Smith
  - Te Tai Tonga MP: Tākuta Ferris

Area
  - Total: 22.44 km^{2} (8.66 sq mi)

Population (2023 census)
  - Total: 204
  - Density: 9.09/km^{2} (23.5/sq mi)

Canvastown is a locality at the point where the Wakamarina River joins the Pelorus River, in Marlborough, New Zealand. State Highway 6 runs through the area. Rai Valley is 17 km to the northwest. Havelock is 10 km to the east.

The town was founded in 1864, after gold was discovered in the Wakamarina Valley. Up to 6000 miners came to make their fortunes. Where there had previously been a Māori Pā, streets of tents sprang up providing accommodation, restaurants and taverns to a population of about 3000 people. About 25,000 ounces (710,000 g) of gold was recovered in 1864.

The surface gold was worked out within two years and most of the miners moved to new gold discoveries on the West Coast. Steam dredges continued to work the river into the 20th century.

== Demographics ==
Canvastown locality covers 22.44 km^{2} (8.66 sq mi). It is part of the larger Marlborough Sounds West statistical area.

Historical population
Year	Pop.	±% p.a.
2006	129	—
2013	129	+0.00%
2018	162	+4.66%
2023	204	+4.72%

Canvastown had a population of 204 in the 2023 New Zealand census, an increase of 42 people (25.9%) since the 2018 census, and an increase of 75 people (58.1%) since the 2013 census. There were 96 males and 108 females in 78 dwellings. 2.9% of people identified as LGBTIQ+. The median age was 45.5 years (compared with 38.1 years nationally). There were 45 people (22.1%) aged under 15 years, 24 (11.8%) aged 15 to 29, 102 (50.0%) aged 30 to 64, and 33 (16.2%) aged 65 or older.

People could identify as more than one ethnicity. The results were 97.1% European (Pākehā); 17.6% Māori; 1.5% Middle Eastern, Latin American and African New Zealanders (MELAA); and 2.9% other, which includes people giving their ethnicity as "New Zealander". English was spoken by 98.5%, Māori by 2.9%, and other languages by 2.9%. No language could be spoken by 2.9% (e.g. too young to talk). The percentage of people born overseas was 7.4, compared with 28.8% nationally.

Religious affiliations were 22.1% Christian, 1.5% Hindu, 1.5% Islam, 1.5% Buddhist, and 1.5% other religions. People who answered that they had no religion were 70.6%, and 7.4% of people did not answer the census question.

Of those at least 15 years old, 12 (7.5%) people had a bachelor's or higher degree, 102 (64.2%) had a post-high school certificate or diploma, and 42 (26.4%) people exclusively held high school qualifications. The median income was $26,900, compared with $41,500 nationally. 6 people (3.8%) earned over $100,000 compared to 12.1% nationally. The employment status of those at least 15 was 75 (47.2%) full-time, 24 (15.1%) part-time, and 3 (1.9%) unemployed.

== Education ==
Canvastown School is a coeducational full primary (years 1–8) school with a decile rating of 5 and a roll of 29. The school was built in 1877 and celebrated its 125th Jubilee in 2002.

Deek Creek School in the Wakamarina Valley opened in 1883 and closed about 1945.

== Marae ==
Te Hora Marae is located in Canvastown. It is the marae (meeting ground) of Ngāti Kuia and includes Te Hora wharenui (meeting house).

In October 2020, the Government committed $32,318 from the Provincial Growth Fund to upgrade the marae, creating four jobs.

== Notable people ==
- Vanessa Weenink (born 1978), National Party politician; grew up in Canvastown

== See also ==
- Maungatapu murders
