= Wakamarina River =

Coordinates: 41°17′S 173°40′E

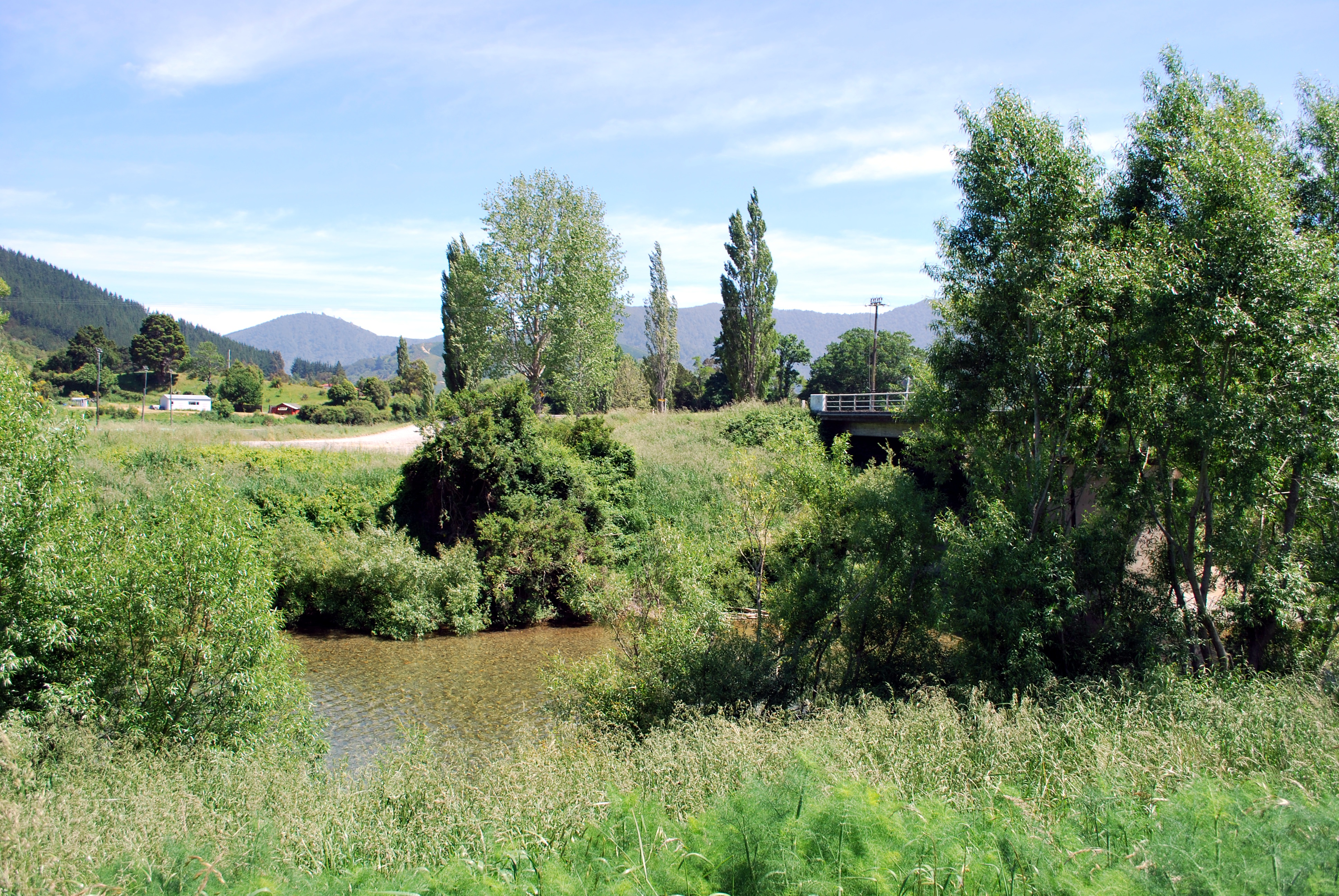

Location
- Country: New Zealand

Physical characteristics
- Source
  - location: Richmond Range
- Mouth
  - location: Pelorus River
- Length: 24 km (15 mi)

The Wakamarina River is a river of the Marlborough Region of New Zealand's South Island. It flows generally northeast from its origins in the Richmond Range to reach the Pelorus River at the settlement of Canvastown, 10 kilometres (6 mi) west of Havelock. In 1864, gold was found in the river near Havelock, and soon 6,000 men were working in the area. The gold rush did not last long and most miners moved on to the West Coast gold rush.

== See also ==
- List of rivers of New Zealand
