= George Fowler (politician) =

Australian politician

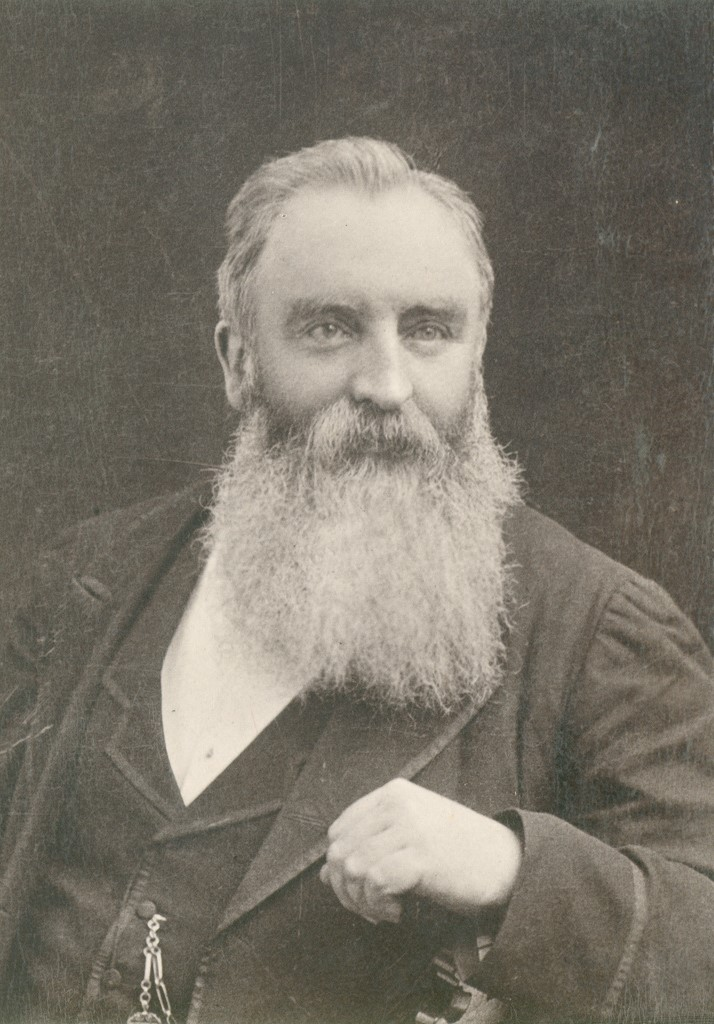

George Swan Fowler (9 March 1839 – 1 October 1896) was a South Australian politician and a Treasurer of South Australia.

Fowler was born in Kilrenny, Fife, Scotland, son of James Fowler (ca.1794 – 9 December 1872), who kept a general store in Anstruther, and here George learned the fundamentals of business. His older brothers James and David emigrated to South Australia (in 1853 and 1854 respectively) and had founded the highly successful grocery business of D. & J. Fowler in Rundle Street, Adelaide when in 1859 James died. George emigrated shortly after, arriving in Adelaide in July 1860 and was accepted as partner in the firm, which retained the name of D. & J. Fowler. By 1865 business had grown to such an extent that they decided to confine themselves to the wholesale trade and opened a branch office in London and a head office in King William Street, Adelaide, of which George had control. His brother David died in England on 11 November 1881 aged 55, leaving George as the senior partner.

Fowler was elected, with John Cox Bray, to the seat of East Adelaide in the South Australian House of Assembly on 2 April 1878, and was re-elected in April 1881 but resigned on 7 June 1881, the day he was sworn in, and was succeeded by Thomas Johnson. He served as treasurer from 10 March 1881 to 10 May 1881 in William Morgan's ministry. Moderate on most subjects, he was a staunch advocate of free trade, opposing protective duties and unbalanced electorates. He castigated the raising of government loans without close study of movements in the London money market. In 1884 he failed to win re-election because of his temperance views (he was a teetotaller). He ran for election at the 1892 East Adelaide by-election but was defeated by John McPherson.

For a time, Fowler and fellow Scotsman William Murray, invested in a pastoral property, "Pandurra", west of Port Augusta. Fowler was active in the Sunday school movement; he served as deacon and treasurer and helped to form the Baptist Association and the aged ministers' fund. As president of the Baptist Union he aimed at dissolving church debts and started a building fund and a mission in India. He substantially funded the construction of the Glen Osmond Baptist Church and the reading room of the Glen Osmond Institute. Fowler died at his home "Wooton Lea" in Glen Osmond, South Australia on 1 October 1896; he was survived by his wife, two sons and two daughters, and left an estate valued at £80,000.

== Family ==
George Swan Fowler married Janet "Catherine" Lamb (ca.1839 – 7 April 1922) on 1 June 1864. Among their children were

- James Richard Fowler, M.A. (Oxford) (25 May 1865 – 17 December 1939) He married Esther Tinline Murray of Glen Osmond on 17 November 1892. Esther was a daughter of noted gardener William Murray.
- Marion Anderson Fowler ( – 5 August 1947) married Ernest Allnutt on 5 October 1893
- Laura Margaret Fowler M.B., Ch.B. (3 May 1868 – September 1952) married Charles (Henry) Standish Hope B.A., M.D., Ch.B. on 4 July 1893. Laura, later to become a noted missionary in India, was in 1893 the first female to graduate in medicine and surgery from the University of Adelaide.
- David Fowler (9 April 1870 – 12 May 1932) was head of David Fowler, Ltd. of Durban, South Africa.
