= Rai River =

Coordinates: 41°18′S 173°34′E

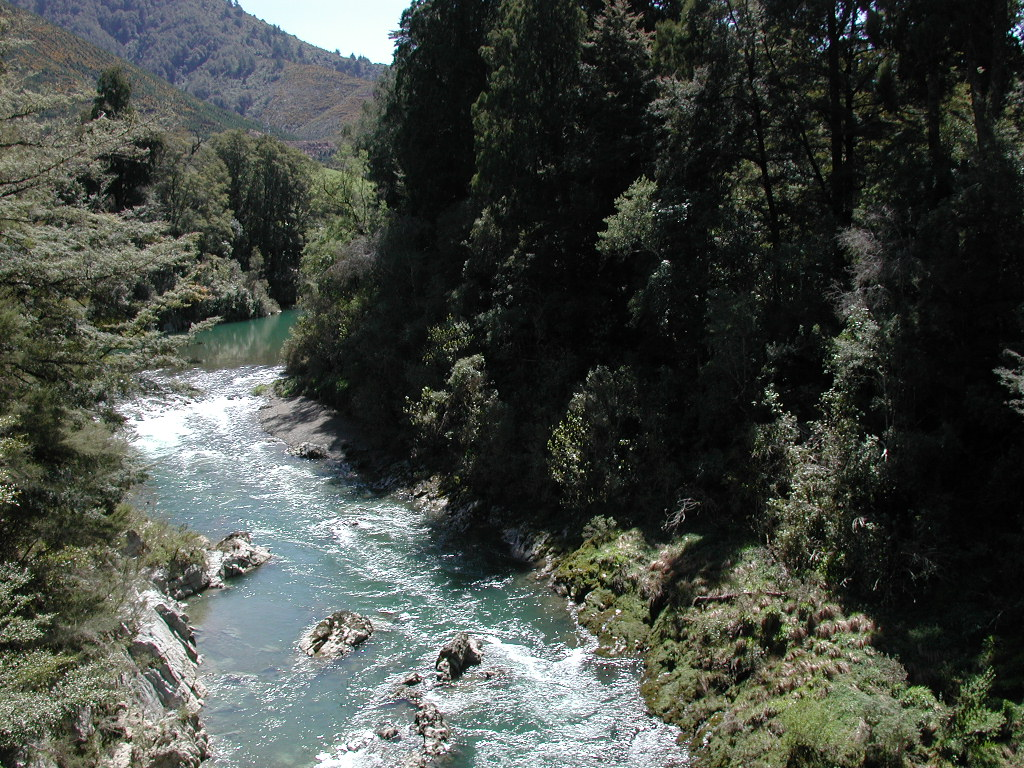
- Rai River upstream from pedestrian suspension bridge in Pelorus Scenic Reserve

Location
- Country: New Zealand

Physical characteristics
- Mouth
  - location: Pelorus River
  - elevation: 25 metres (82 ft)
- Length: 15 km (9.3 mi)

The Rai River is a river of the Tasman Region of New Zealand's South Island. It flows predominantly south, reaching the Pelorus River at Pelorus Bridge. The township of Rai Valley in Marlborough district is located close to the river's banks.

== See also ==
- List of rivers of New Zealand
