= Pelorus River =

Te Hoiere / Pelorus River
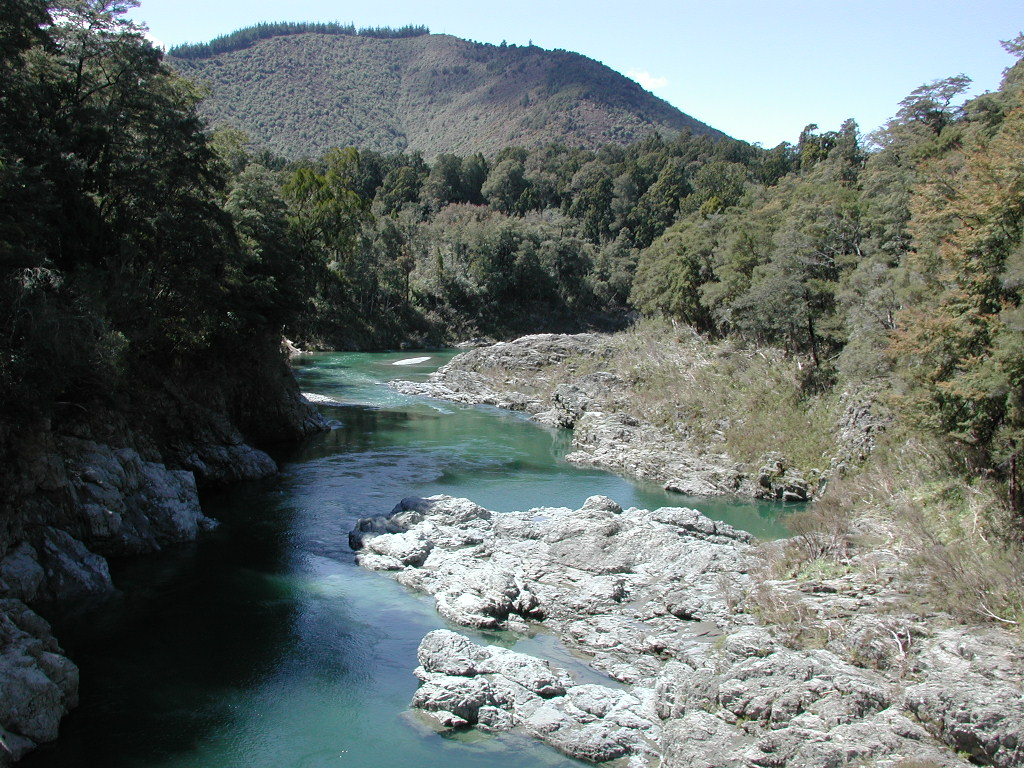
- Te Hoiere / Pelorus River from Pelorus Bridge
- Native name: Te Hoiere (Māori)

Location
- Country: New Zealand
- Region: Marlborough

Physical characteristics
- Source
  - location: Richmond Range
- Mouth
  - location: Pelorus Sound / Te Hoiere
  - coordinates: 41°16′S 173°45′E
- Length: 40 km (25 mi)

Basin features
- Tributaries
  - left: Tinline River, Rai River
  - right: Rainy River, Wakamarina River

Te Hoiere / Pelorus River is a river at the northern end of South Island of New Zealand in the region of Marlborough. It flows from the Richmond Range into Pelorus Sound / Te Hoiere. This area is fantastic for camping and is renowned for its magnificent river swimming where the Pelorus River runs through a gorge at Pelorus Bridge.

At Pelorus Bridge Scenic Reserve, the river was used as a film locations for the barrel rider scene in The Hobbit: The Desolation of Smaug, which increased the area's popularity for river rafting.

In August 2014, the river's name was officially altered to Te Hoiere / Pelorus River, reviving the Māori name for this waterway.

== History ==
The Pelorus River was originally known as Te Hoeire by local Māori after the first canoe to travel to the South Island. The river flows east until it enters Pelorus Sound at Havelock. The valley was the site of a massacre of Ngāti Kuia and Ngāti Apa ki te Rā Tō by Te Rauparaha. European exploration and exploitation was begun by Lieutenant Chetwode of HMS Pelorus in 1838, who named both the river and the sound after his vessel. Brownlee Tramway transported timber from the Carluke Sawmill through the river valley to the shipping port and mill of Blackball, Havelock, from c.1881 through to 1915.
