= Rai Valley =

Rural settlement in Marlborough, New Zealand

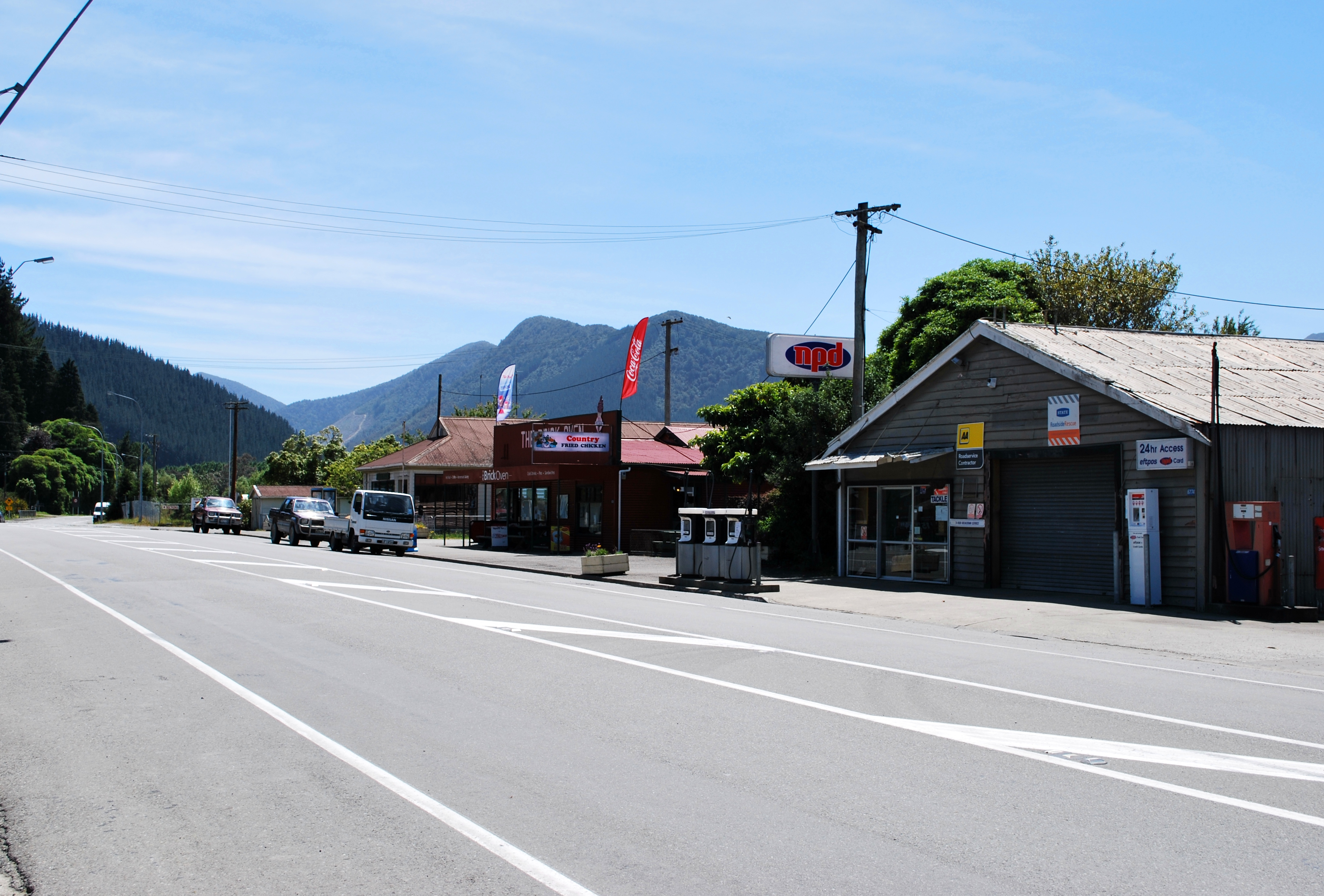
- Interactive map of Rai Valley
- Coordinates: 41°13′39″S 173°34′59″E
- Country: New Zealand
- District: Marlborough
- Ward: Marlborough Sounds General Ward; Marlborough Māori Ward
- Electorates: Kaikōura; Te Tai Tonga (Māori)

Government
  - Territorial Authority: Marlborough District Council
  - Marlborough District Mayor: Nadine Taylor
  - Kaikōura MP: Stuart Smith
  - Te Tai Tonga MP: Tākuta Ferris

Area
  - Total: 27.96 km^{2} (10.80 sq mi)

Population (June 2025)
  - Total: 170
  - Density: 6.1/km^{2} (16/sq mi)

Rai Valley is a rural settlement in Marlborough, New Zealand. It is located on State Highway 6, 68 km (42 mi) northwest of Blenheim and 46 km (29 mi) east of Nelson. The Rai River runs past the locality to join the Pelorus River at the locality of Pelorus Bridge to the south. At the 2018 census, the settlement had a population of 177.

The area may have been named for the Rangitāne chief, Rai kau moana.

The locality supports dairy farming in the area, with a dairy and cheese factory established in about 1909.

== History ==
The Valley was one of the last areas explored by Europeans in northern Marlborough. John Tinline discovered it while looking for a route to Nelson in January 1850.

The Rai Valley was densely forested in the 19th century. A township grew up at Carluke, just to the west of Rai Valley locality, around a sawmill built by William Brownlee in 1907. About 100 people worked at the mill, and a light railway connected it to a port on the Pelorus River.

Returned servicemen took up many local farms in 1919.

== Demographics ==
Rai Valley is described by Statistics New Zealand as a rural settlement. It covers 27.96 km^{2} (10.80 sq mi) and had an estimated population of 170 as of June 2025, with a population density of 6.1 people per km^{2}. It is part of the larger Marlborough Sounds West statistical area.

Historical population
Year	Pop.	±% p.a.
2006	141	—
2013	147	+0.60%
2018	177	+3.78%
2023	171	−0.69%

Rai Valley had a population of 171 in the 2023 New Zealand census, a decrease of 6 people (−3.4%) since the 2018 census, and an increase of 24 people (16.3%) since the 2013 census. There were 87 males, 84 females, and 3 people of other genders in 63 dwellings. 3.5% of people identified as LGBTIQ+. The median age was 39.1 years (compared with 38.1 years nationally). There were 39 people (22.8%) aged under 15 years, 27 (15.8%) aged 15 to 29, 78 (45.6%) aged 30 to 64, and 27 (15.8%) aged 65 or older.

People could identify as more than one ethnicity. The results were 96.5% European (Pākehā), 10.5% Māori, and 3.5% other, which includes people giving their ethnicity as "New Zealander". English was spoken by 100.0%, Māori by 1.8%, and other languages by 7.0%. The percentage of people born overseas was 12.3, compared with 28.8% nationally.

Religious affiliations were 15.8% Christian. People who answered that they had no religion were 71.9%, and 12.3% of people did not answer the census question.

Of those at least 15 years old, 12 (9.1%) people had a bachelor's or higher degree, 84 (63.6%) had a post-high school certificate or diploma, and 39 (29.5%) people exclusively held high school qualifications. The median income was $36,300, compared with $41,500 nationally. 3 people (2.3%) earned over $100,000 compared to 12.1% nationally. The employment status of those at least 15 was 69 (52.3%) full-time, 21 (15.9%) part-time, and 3 (2.3%) unemployed.

== Education ==
Rai Valley Area School is a coeducational composite (years 1–13) school with a decile rating of 6 and a roll of 94.

There were many schools in the area in the early 20th century:

- Ronga School opened in 1913, was destroyed by fire in 1918 and rebuilt in 1920.
- Opouri Valley School, 1911-1921
- Upper Opouri School 1928-1938
- Carluke School opened in 1907 as Rimu Gully School, and became Carluke School from 1908 to 1938
- Rai Valley School was open by 1901. It was sometimes called Flat Creek School.
- Billy Goat School, late 1920s to c. 1938
- Kaiuma Flat Creek School, 1919 to c. 1927
- Tinline Valley School, 1923-1949
- Tunakino School, 1920-1933

Ronga, Opouri and Carluke schools were merged into Rai Valley School in 1939. Rai Valley became an area school in 1978.

== Climate ==
Climate data for Rai Valley (1981–2010 normals, extremes 1962–1987)
Month	Jan	Feb	Mar	Apr	May	Jun	Jul	Aug	Sep	Oct	Nov	Dec	Year
Record high °C (°F)	31.5 (88.7)	33.6 (92.5)	30.0 (86.0)	25.7 (78.3)	21.8 (71.2)	19.2 (66.6)	19.6 (67.3)	18.8 (65.8)	24.0 (75.2)	25.3 (77.5)	27.6 (81.7)	28.7 (83.7)	33.6 (92.5)
Mean daily maximum °C (°F)	22.5 (72.5)	23.2 (73.8)	21.2 (70.2)	18.2 (64.8)	15.6 (60.1)	12.7 (54.9)	12.4 (54.3)	13.8 (56.8)	15.6 (60.1)	17.1 (62.8)	18.8 (65.8)	20.7 (69.3)	17.7 (63.8)
Daily mean °C (°F)	16.7 (62.1)	16.8 (62.2)	15.6 (60.1)	12.5 (54.5)	10.1 (50.2)	7.6 (45.7)	6.8 (44.2)	8.1 (46.6)	10.2 (50.4)	12.0 (53.6)	13.4 (56.1)	15.7 (60.3)	12.1 (53.8)
Mean daily minimum °C (°F)	10.9 (51.6)	10.4 (50.7)	9.9 (49.8)	6.8 (44.2)	4.6 (40.3)	2.5 (36.5)	1.2 (34.2)	2.4 (36.3)	4.8 (40.6)	6.8 (44.2)	8.0 (46.4)	10.6 (51.1)	6.6 (43.8)
Record low °C (°F)	1.3 (34.3)	0.7 (33.3)	−3.0 (26.6)	−4.1 (24.6)	−6.9 (19.6)	−7.6 (18.3)	−7.8 (18.0)	−6.6 (20.1)	−5.2 (22.6)	−4.4 (24.1)	−2.0 (28.4)	−0.7 (30.7)	−7.8 (18.0)
Average rainfall mm (inches)	140.8 (5.54)	113.7 (4.48)	152.1 (5.99)	197.5 (7.78)	193.8 (7.63)	171.3 (6.74)	176.5 (6.95)	162.4 (6.39)	141.0 (5.55)	223.4 (8.80)	164.2 (6.46)	180.6 (7.11)	2,017.3 (79.42)
Source: NIWA (rain 1971–2000)
