= John Tinline =

Scots-born New Zealand surveyor, sheep farmer and philanthropist (1821–1907)

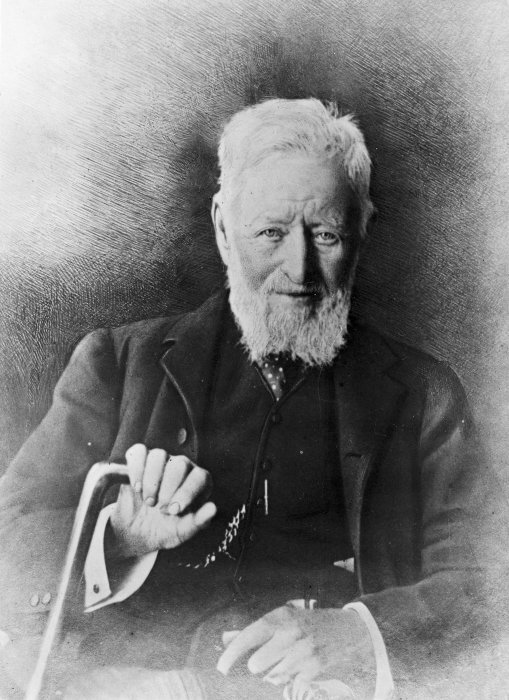
- Tinline in c. 1890
- Born: 1821; Jedburgh, Scotland
- Died: 26 February 1907 (aged 86); Nelson, New Zealand
- Education: Jedburgh Grammar School
- Occupation: sheep farmer

John Tinline (1821 – 26 February 1907) was a Scottish-born New Zealand sheep farmer, politician, and philanthropist. He emigrated briefly to Australia before moving on to New Zealand. He learned Māori and was made a magistrate. He was successful at sheep farming and owned huge farms. After he sold these he visited his home town and gave his Scottish hometown Jedburgh a new park.

== Life ==
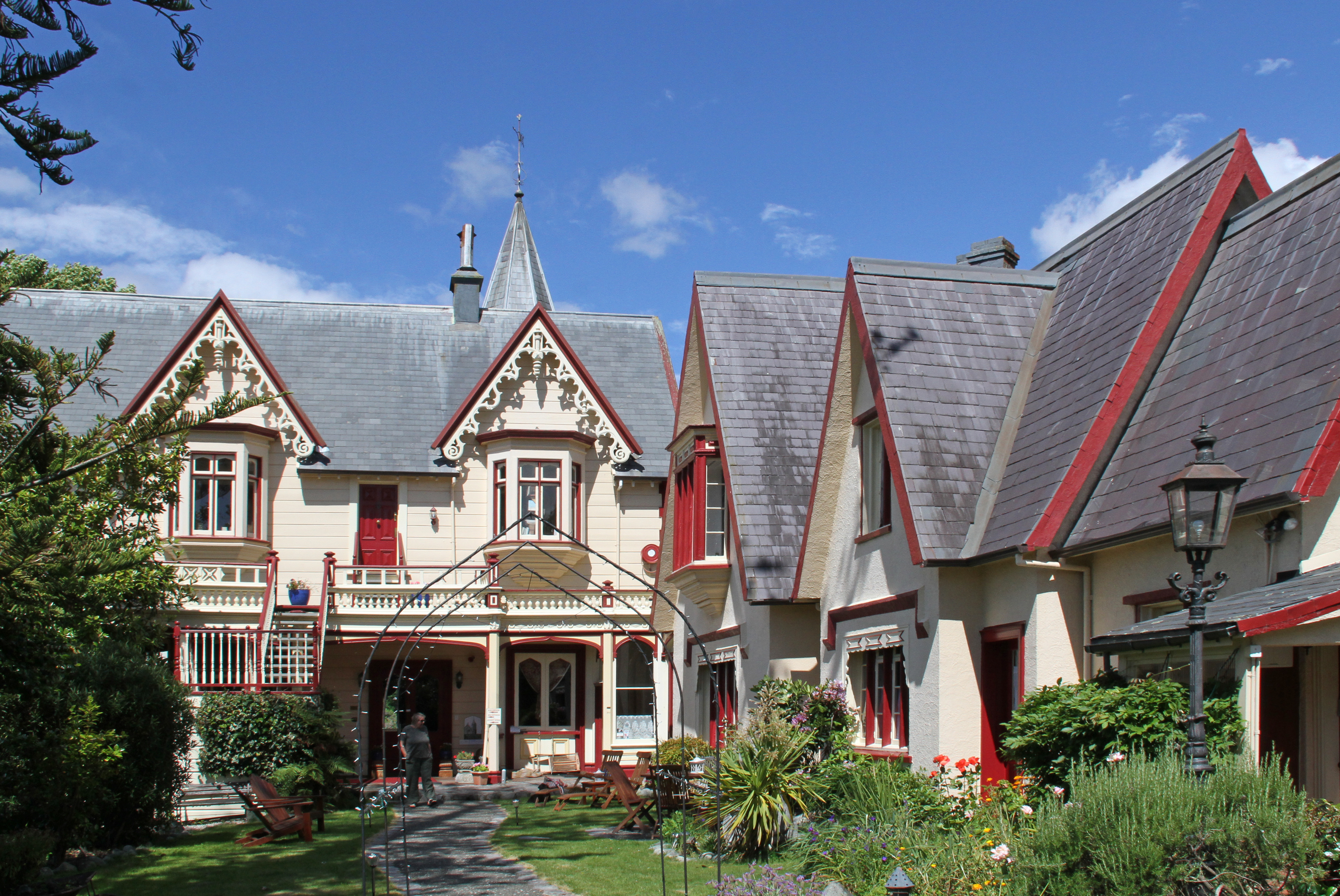
Warwick House in 2016

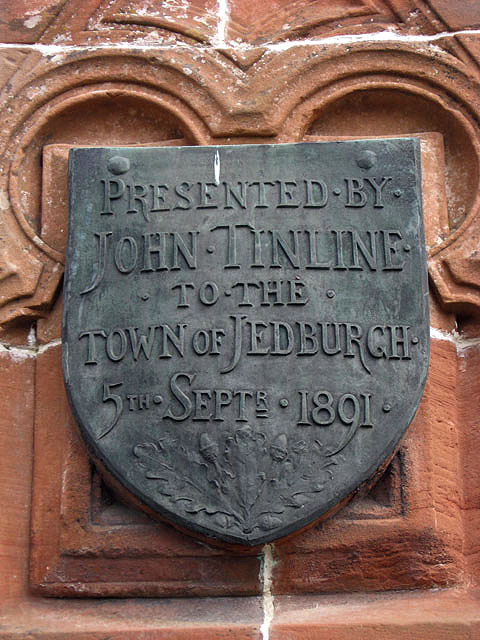
Plaque on the entrance to Allerley Well Park in Jedburgh

Tinline was born in Jedburgh in 1821. His parents Esther (née Easton) and John were poor. He was taught at Jedburgh Grammar School. His elder brother, George Tinline, emigrated to Australia in 1838.

On 3 September 1839 Tinline followed his brother and joined a ship, the Bengal Merchant, bound for Sydney. He arrived in January of the following year. He was expecting to find his brother in Sydney but George had moved to Adelaide to become the Bank of South Australia's accountant at £400 a year. He soon found his brother and stayed with him whilst he took work doing some surveying. He decided to set sail again; this time for Wellington in New Zealand where he arrived in September 1840. Within weeks he had been introduced to others by his cousin, Robert Waitt, and he was a partner in a storekeeping business in Wellington. In 1842 he went to establish a new store for the company in Nelson but while he was away the company warehouse caught fire and he was penniless.

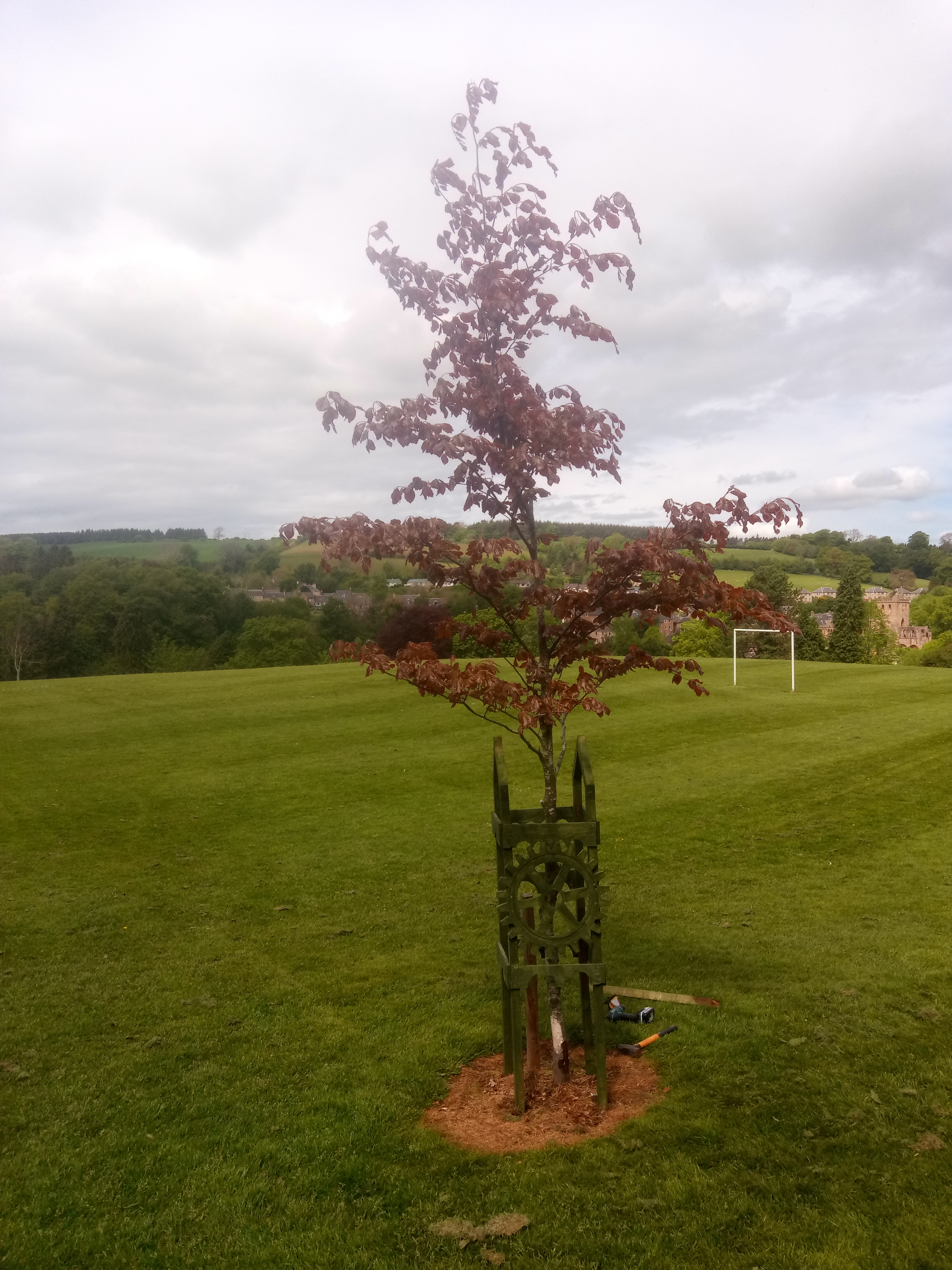
The park he donated in 2021

Tinline had employed an assistant who had taught him to speak Maori. In 1844 the governor, Robert FitzRoy, visited Nelson and appreciating Tinline's talents he made him a magistrate and an interpreter for the natives. He served in this role until 1852.

Rai Valley was one of the last areas explored by Europeans in northern Marlborough. Tinline discovered it together with John Barnicoat while looking for a route to Nelson in January 1850. Tinline River's name commemorates his discovery of a route from Nelson to the Wairau. Tinline lived for some time in Mārahau and the nearby Tinline Bay, with Tinline Stream flowing into it, are named after him. Mount Tinline and Tinline Creek are located in the Canterbury's Amuri Range.

Tinline was a member of the Nelson Provincial Council during the second council. From 9 October 1857 to 26 January 1858, he represented the Wairau electorate. From 14 June 1859 to 12 March 1860, he represented the Amuri electorate. He is referred to as John Tinline of Amuri in university notices regarding nationwide prizes set up in his name, for "the student who achieved the highest aggregate marks in Stage III English courses".

In 1891 he visited Jedburgh and whilst he was there he agreed to purchase a park for the town. As of 2020, the park still exists. A sign at the entrance records both the opening in 1891 and Tinline's generosity. The town gave him the Freedom of the Town.

His brother George died in 1895. Tinline died in Nelson on 26 February 1907. Warwick House had been his residence.
