= Havelock, New Zealand =

Town in Marlborough, New Zealand

Havelock
- Town
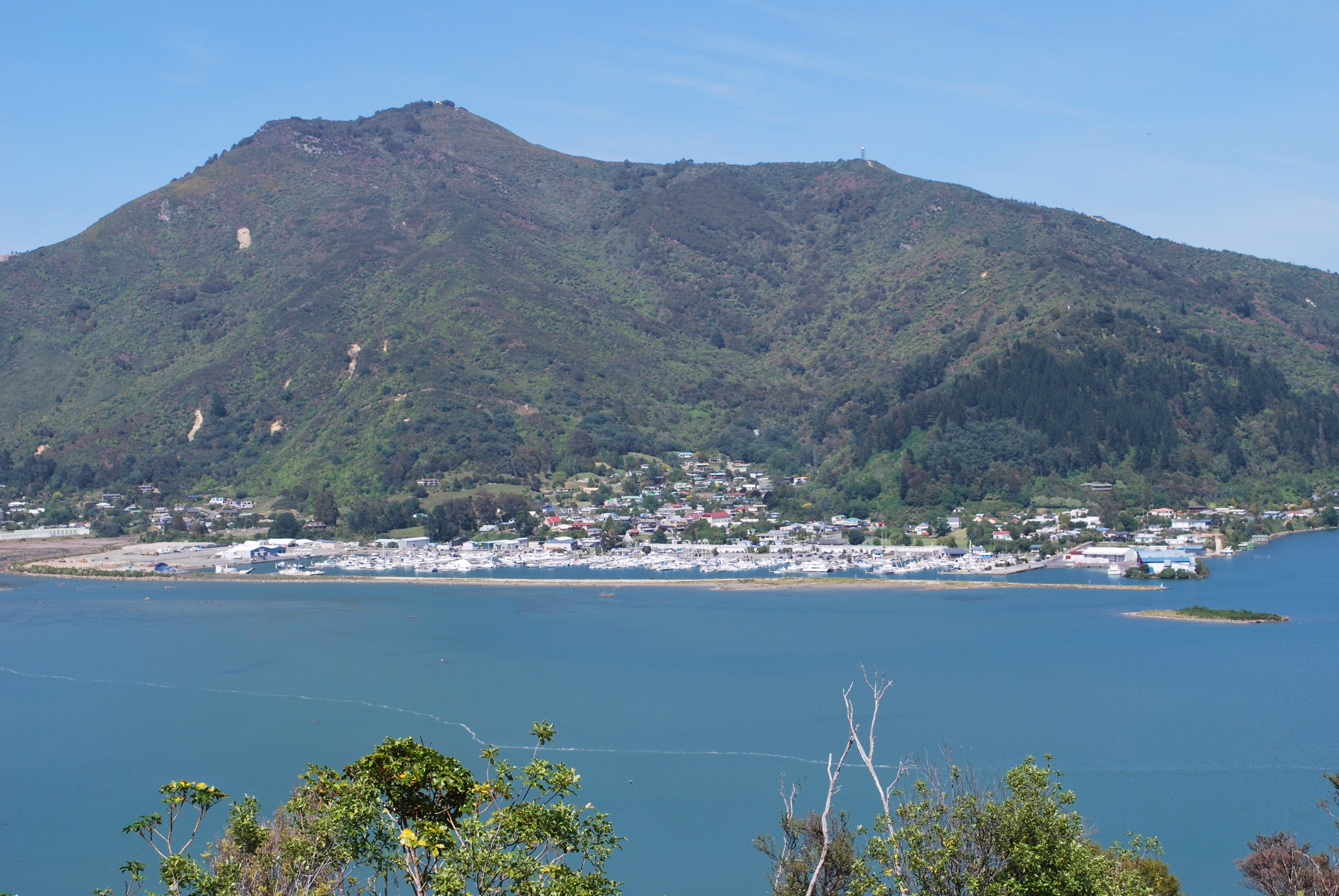
- Havelock seen across Pelorus Sound
- Interactive map of Havelock
- Coordinates: 41°16′59″S 173°46′0″E
- Region: Marlborough
- Ward: Marlborough Sounds General Ward; Marlborough Māori Ward
- Electorates: Kaikōura; Te Tai Tonga (Māori)

Government
  - Territorial Authority: Marlborough District Council
  - Marlborough District Mayor: Nadine Taylor
  - Kaikōura MP: Stuart Smith
  - Te Tai Tonga MP: Tākuta Ferris

Area
  - Total: 1.76 km^{2} (0.68 sq mi)

Population (June 2025)
  - Total: 640
  - Density: 360/km^{2} (940/sq mi)

Havelock is a small town in the Marlborough Region of New Zealand, at the head of Pelorus Sound, one of the Marlborough Sounds, and at the mouth of the Pelorus and Kaituna Rivers

State Highway 6 from Nelson to Blenheim passes through the town. Queen Charlotte Drive, which provides a shorter but very winding road to Picton proceeds east along the edge of the Sounds. Canvastown lies 10 kilometres (6.2 mi) to the west. Renwick is 31 km (19 mi) to the south. Picton lies 35 km to the east.

Havelock serves as the centre for much of the New Zealand green-lipped mussel industry, and promotes itself as the greenshell mussel capital of the world. It also functions as the base for a mail boat servicing the remote communities in the Marlborough Sounds, as well as for many fishing and recreational boats.

The name "Havelock" commemorates Sir Henry Havelock (1795–1857), known from the Siege of Lucknow during the Indian Rebellion of 1857. The streets were laid out in 1858, with Lucknow Street as the main thoroughfare. The gold rush to the Wakamarina Valley in 1864 boosted the growth of the township, with sawmilling becoming the main activity until the 1910s, later joined by dairying. The valleys around Havelock contain many pine plantations.

Across the Kaituna River estuary, the Cullen Point Scenic Reserve and the Mahakipawa Hill Scenic Reserve offer a coastal walking-track to a lookout at Cullen Point.

== Demographics ==
Havelock is described by Statistics New Zealand as a rural settlement. It covers 1.76 km^{2} (0.68 sq mi) and had an estimated population of 640 as of June 2025, with a population density of 364 people per km^{2}. It is part of the larger Marlborough Sounds West statistical area.

Historical population for Havelock
Year	Pop.	±% p.a.
2006	510	—
2013	507	−0.08%
2018	594	+3.22%
2023	645	+1.66%
The 2006 population is for a smaller area of 1.67 km^{2}. Source:

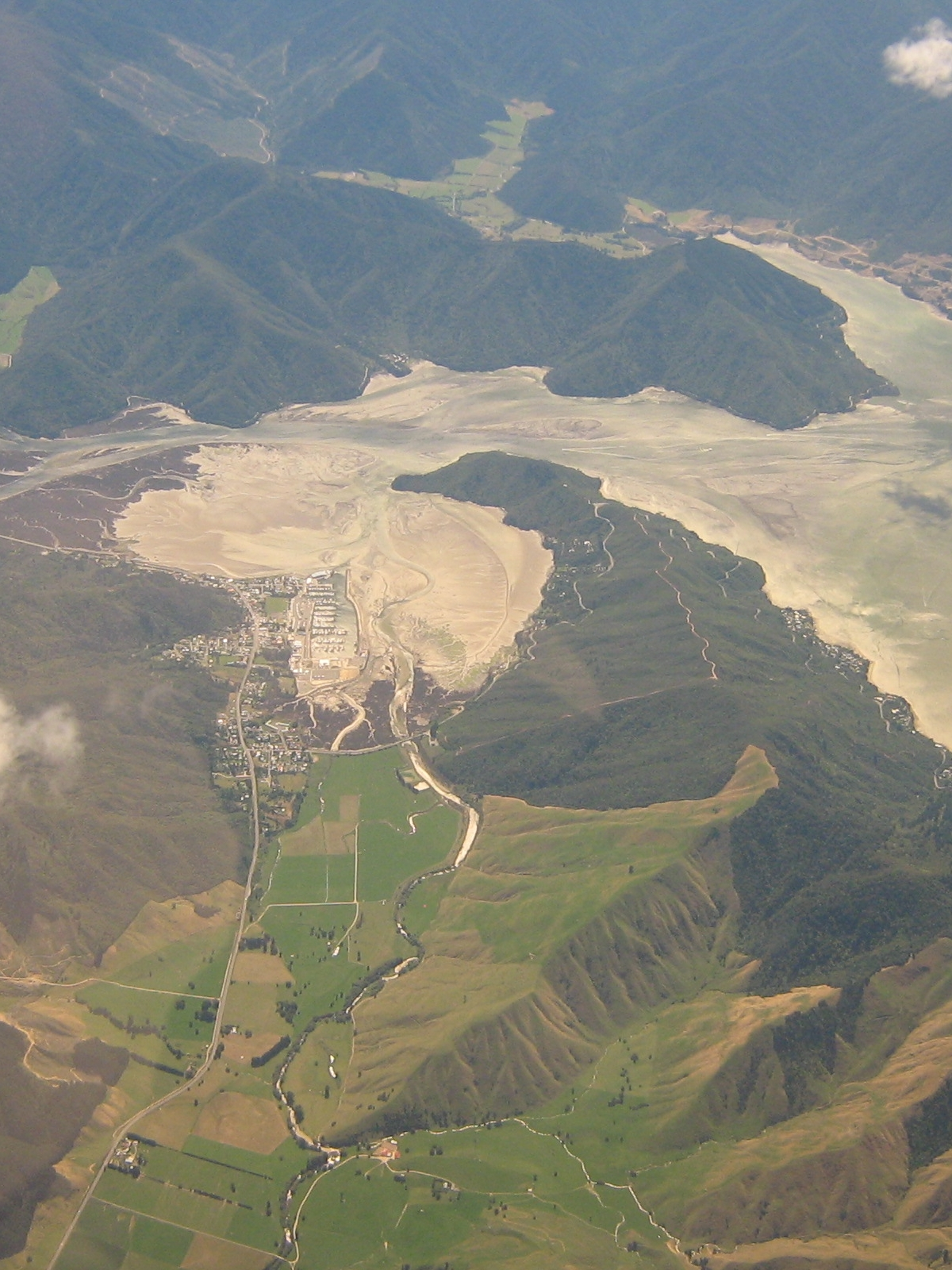
Havelock from the air looking north, at low tide.

Havelock had a population of 645 in the 2023 New Zealand census, an increase of 51 people (8.6%) since the 2018 census, and an increase of 138 people (27.2%) since the 2013 census. There were 321 males, 321 females, and 3 people of other genders in 285 dwellings. 2.8% of people identified as LGBTIQ+. The median age was 51.4 years (compared with 38.1 years nationally). There were 81 people (12.6%) aged under 15 years, 78 (12.1%) aged 15 to 29, 315 (48.8%) aged 30 to 64, and 171 (26.5%) aged 65 or older.

People could identify as more than one ethnicity. The results were 84.2% European (Pākehā); 15.8% Māori; 4.2% Pasifika; 6.0% Asian; 1.4% Middle Eastern, Latin American and African New Zealanders (MELAA); and 7.4% other, which includes people giving their ethnicity as "New Zealander". English was spoken by 98.6%, Māori by 3.3%, Samoan by 1.4%, and other languages by 10.2%. No language could be spoken by 0.9% (e.g. too young to talk). New Zealand Sign Language was known by 0.5%. The percentage of people born overseas was 22.3, compared with 28.8% nationally.

Religious affiliations were 28.4% Christian, 0.5% Hindu, 0.5% Islam, 0.5% Māori religious beliefs, 1.4% Buddhist, 1.9% New Age, and 0.9% other religions. People who answered that they had no religion were 57.7%, and 8.4% of people did not answer the census question.

Of those at least 15 years old, 78 (13.8%) people had a bachelor's or higher degree, 315 (55.9%) had a post-high school certificate or diploma, and 165 (29.3%) people exclusively held high school qualifications. The median income was $36,700, compared with $41,500 nationally. 39 people (6.9%) earned over $100,000 compared to 12.1% nationally. The employment status of those at least 15 was 279 (49.5%) full-time, 78 (13.8%) part-time, and 12 (2.1%) unemployed.

=== Marlborough Sounds West ===
Marlborough Sounds West, which also includes Rai Valley and Ōkiwi Bay, covers 1,554.04 km^{2} (600.02 sq mi) and had an estimated population of 2,140 as of June 2025, with a population density of 1.4 people per km^{2}.

Historical population for Marlborough Sounds West
Year	Pop.	±% p.a.
2006	1,890	—
2013	1,806	−0.65%
2018	1,989	+1.95%
2023	2,133	+1.41%
The 2006 population is for a smaller area of 1,553.91 km^{2}. Source:

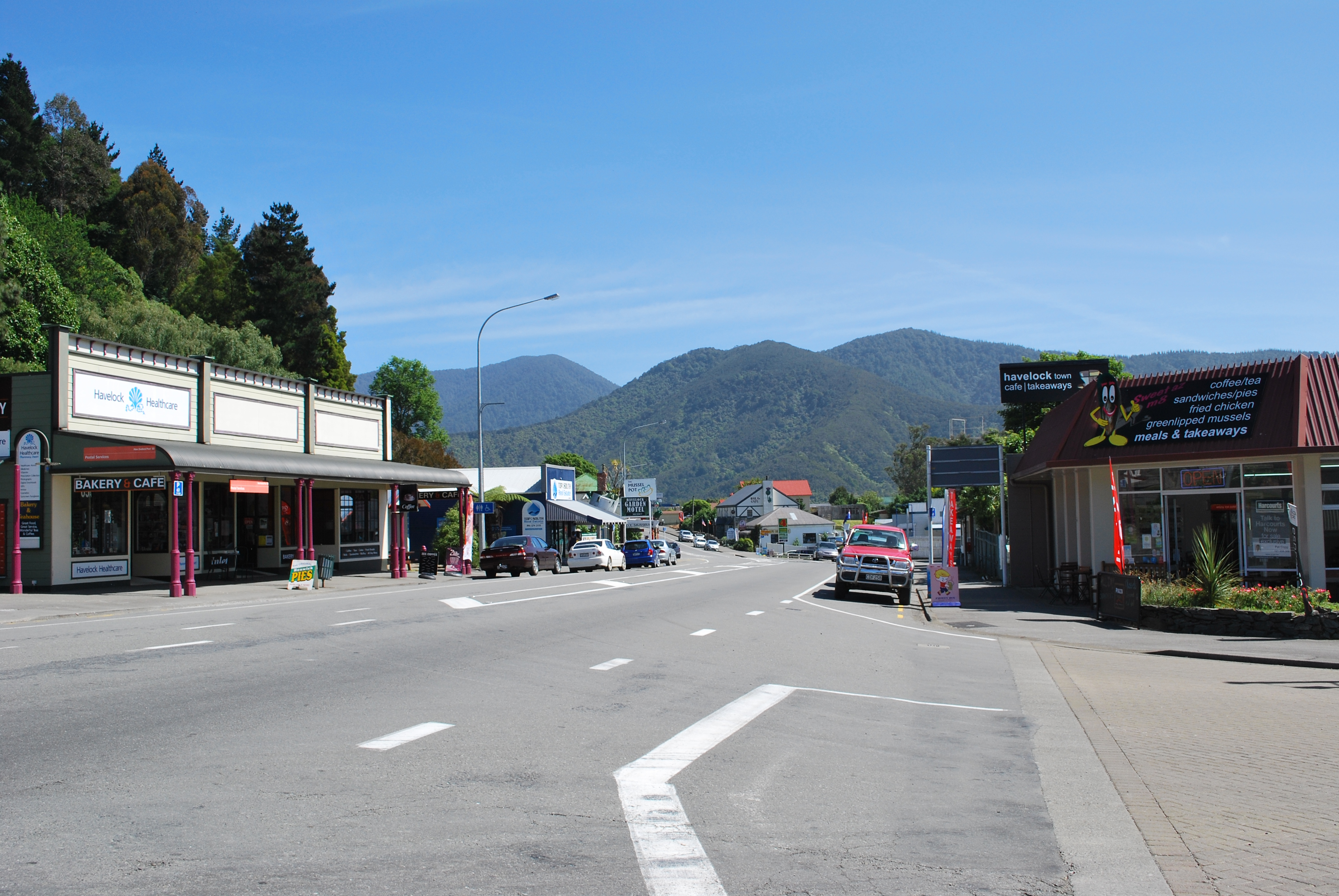
Havelock main road

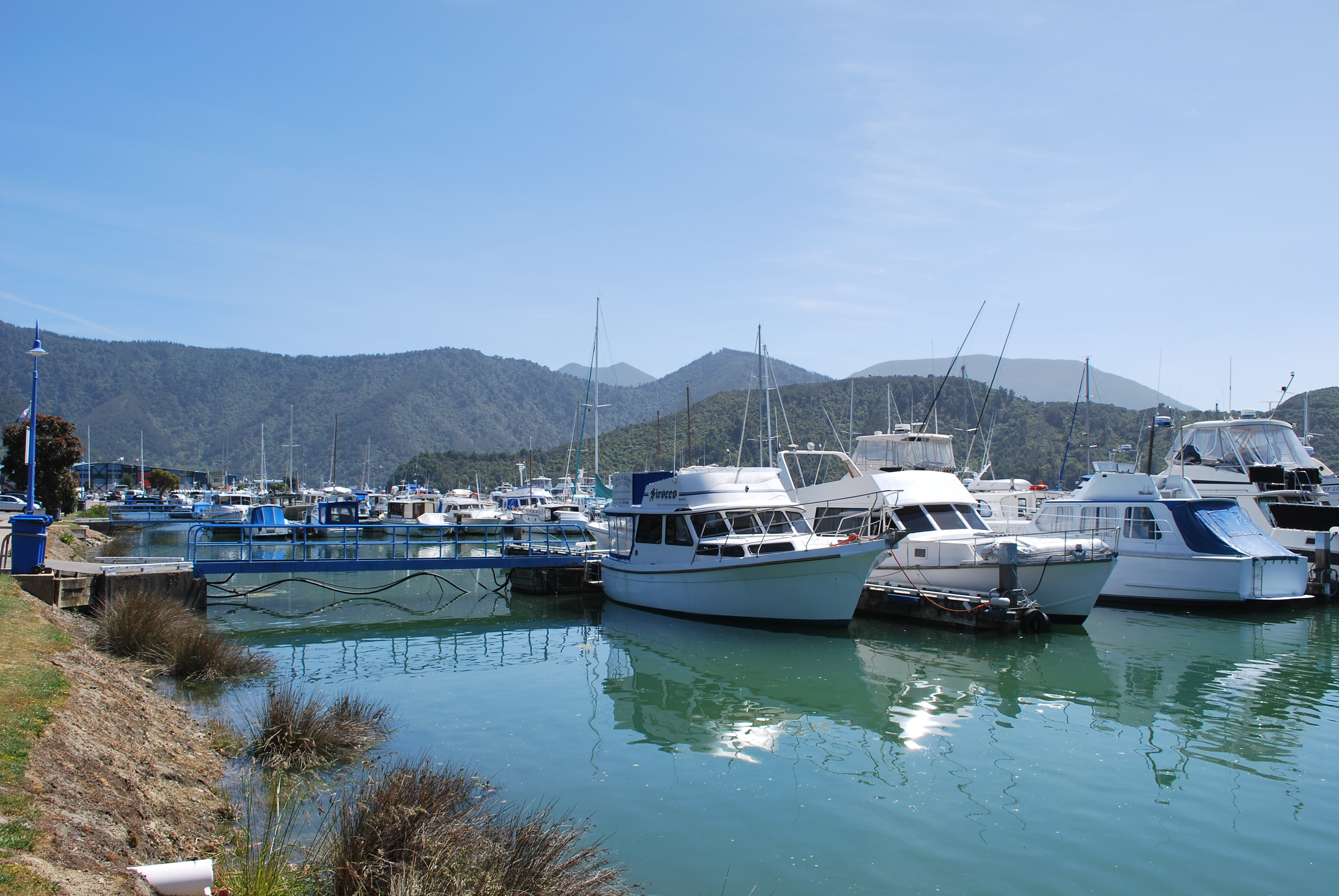
Havelock marina

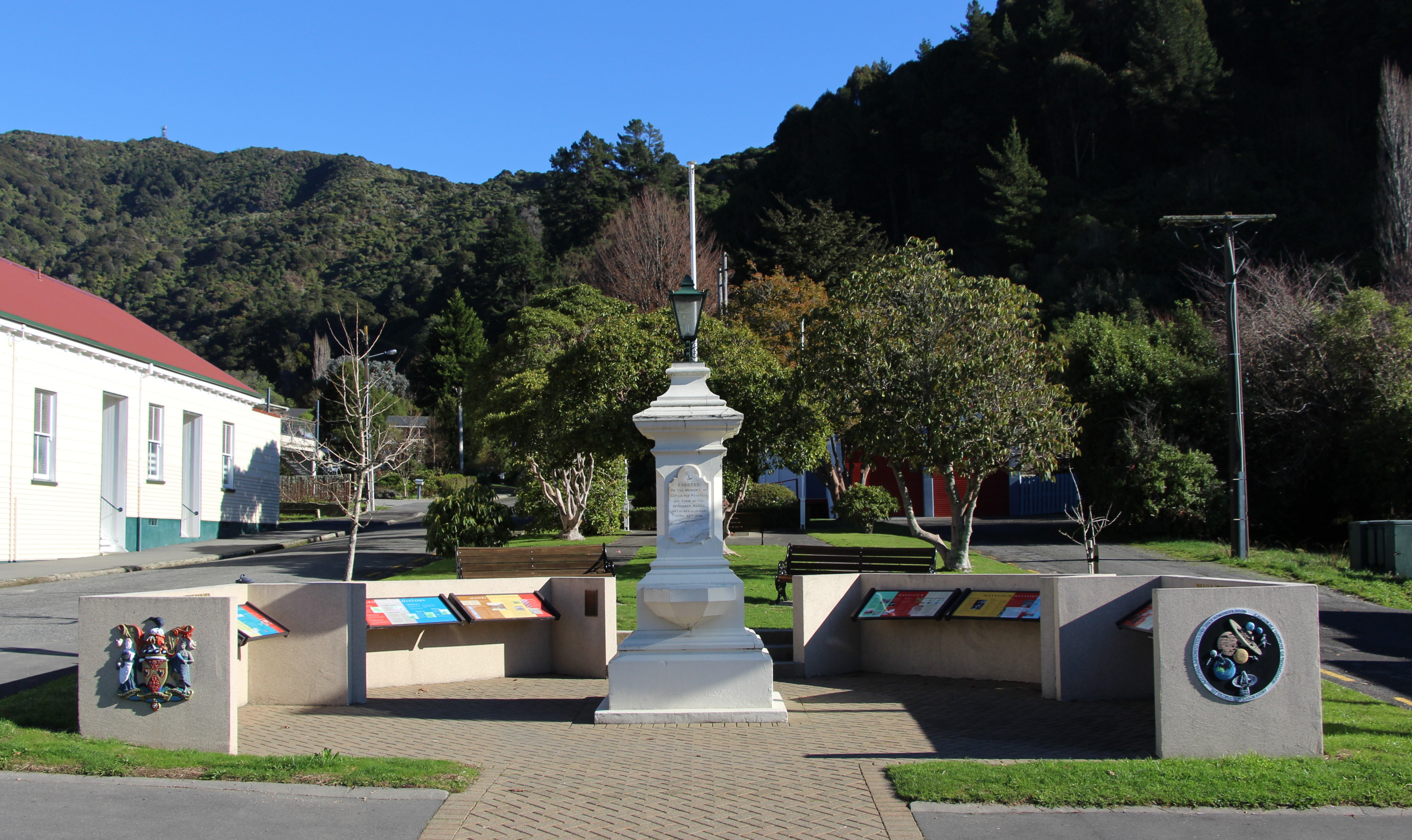
Rutherford-Pickering memorial

Marlborough Sounds West had a population of 2,133 in the 2023 New Zealand census, an increase of 144 people (7.2%) since the 2018 census, and an increase of 327 people (18.1%) since the 2013 census. There were 1,077 males, 1,047 females, and 12 people of other genders in 969 dwellings. 2.3% of people identified as LGBTIQ+. The median age was 52.4 years (compared with 38.1 years nationally). There were 297 people (13.9%) aged under 15 years, 246 (11.5%) aged 15 to 29, 1,038 (48.7%) aged 30 to 64, and 555 (26.0%) aged 65 or older.

People could identify as more than one ethnicity. The results were 90.4% European (Pākehā); 13.1% Māori; 2.3% Pasifika; 2.8% Asian; 0.8% Middle Eastern, Latin American and African New Zealanders (MELAA); and 3.5% other, which includes people giving their ethnicity as "New Zealander". English was spoken by 98.7%, Māori by 2.3%, Samoan by 0.7%, and other languages by 8.0%. No language could be spoken by 1.0% (e.g. too young to talk). New Zealand Sign Language was known by 0.6%. The percentage of people born overseas was 16.9, compared with 28.8% nationally.

Religious affiliations were 26.7% Christian, 0.1% Hindu, 0.1% Islam, 0.3% Māori religious beliefs, 1.0% Buddhist, 1.0% New Age, and 1.0% other religions. People who answered that they had no religion were 60.2%, and 9.8% of people did not answer the census question.

Of those at least 15 years old, 231 (12.6%) people had a bachelor's or higher degree, 1,062 (57.8%) had a post-high school certificate or diploma, and 552 (30.1%) people exclusively held high school qualifications. The median income was $31,700, compared with $41,500 nationally. 111 people (6.0%) earned over $100,000 compared to 12.1% nationally. The employment status of those at least 15 was 807 (44.0%) full-time, 297 (16.2%) part-time, and 45 (2.5%) unemployed.

== Education ==
Havelock School is a coeducational full primary school (years 1-8), with a roll of 39 as of July 2026. The school was founded in 1861 or 1866, and moved across the road to its current site in 1961. The school celebrated its 150th anniversary in 2011.

Havelock Suburban School, in the Kaituna Valley south of Havelock, was established in 1881 and was extant in 1923. It closed about 1927.

Kaiuma School in Kaiuma Bay, north of Havelock, opened in 1880 and was extant in 1924.

=== Notable students at Havelock School ===
- William Pickering, space scientist and former director of NASA's Jet Propulsion Laboratory
- Ernest Rutherford, Nobel Prize-winning physicist

== See also ==
- Moenui
