= Delaware Bay (New Zealand) =

Coordinates: 41°09′S 173°28′E

Delaware Bay is an indentation in the New Zealand South Island coast east of Pepin Island, to the north of Nelson. It is part of the larger Tasman Bay / Te Tai-o-Aorere. The bay is named after the Delaware, a newly built brig which sank here on its maiden voyage from Nelson to Napier in 1863, an incident best remembered for the dramatic rescue attempts by a group of local Māori.
