= Lake Tennyson =

Lake in Hurunui District, New Zealand

Coordinates: 42°12′S 172°44′E

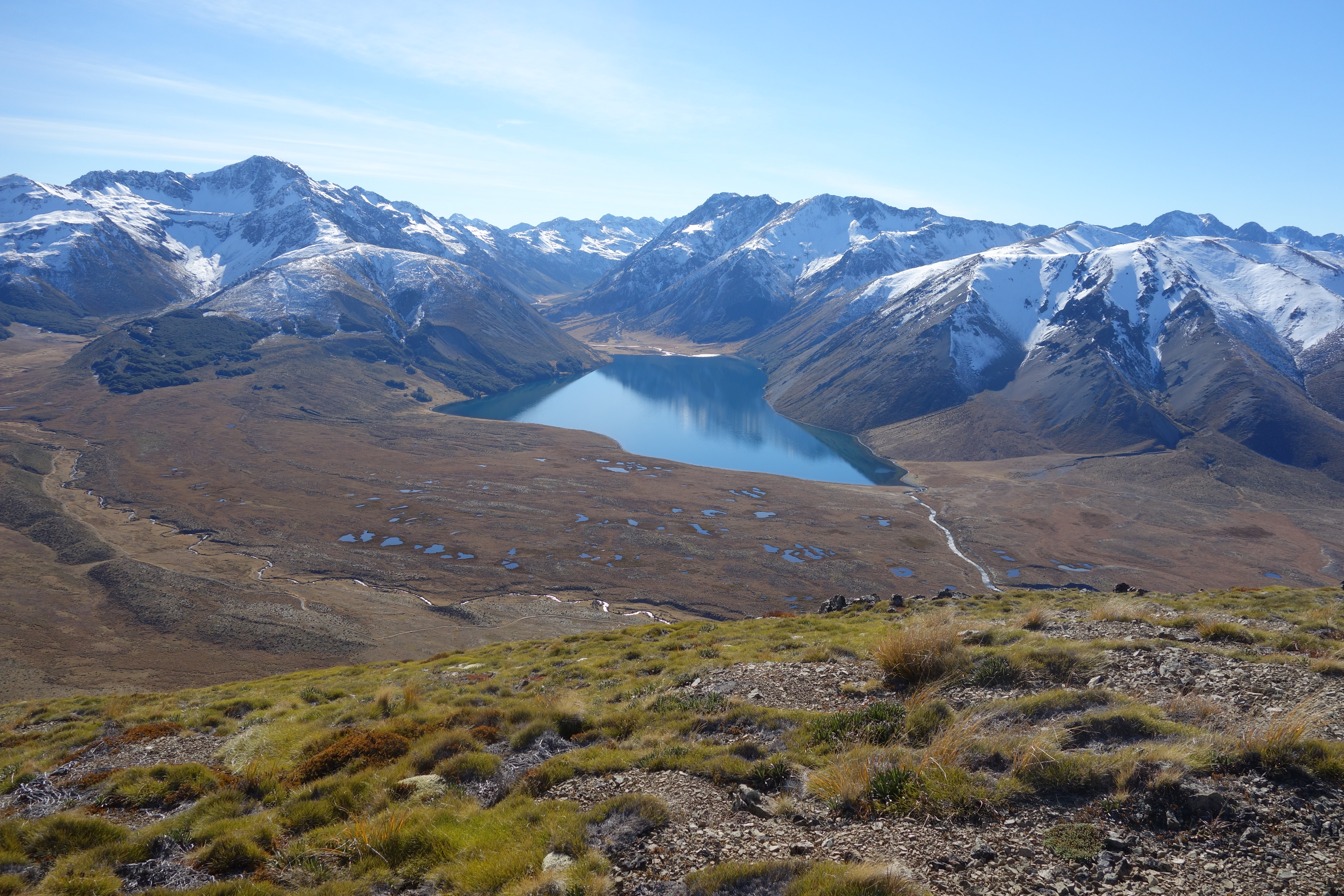
Lake Tennyson as seen from the south

Lake Tennyson (elevation 1,102 metres or 3,615 feet) (Māori name: Rangitahi) is a glacial high-country lake in Canterbury, New Zealand. The first European settler to see the lake was Frederick Weld in 1853, who also named it. The headwaters of the Waiau Toa / Clarence River are just to the north, and the river flows through Lake Tennyson.

== History ==
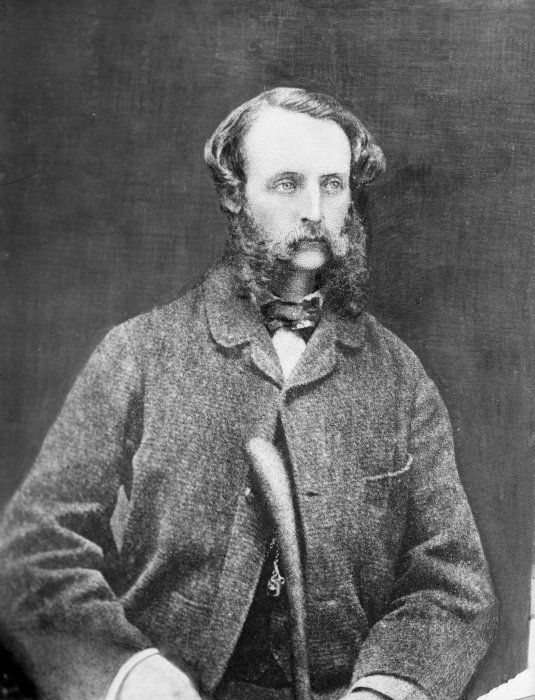
Frederick Weld, who first saw Lake Tennyson in 1853, in circa 1865

Lake Tennyson was discovered by Frederick Weld in 1853; Weld was the inaugural member of parliament for the Wairau electorate. The nearby Mount Weld is named for Weld, who climbed the mountain in March 1855. The reason for Weld exploring the area was his search for an overland route between Nelson and Canterbury for driving sheep. The lake is assumed to be named for the poet Alfred, Lord Tennyson. Weld described the lake as follows:

Lake Tennyson in beauty far surpasses anything that I have ever seen in New Zealand.

— Frederick Weld,

== Description ==
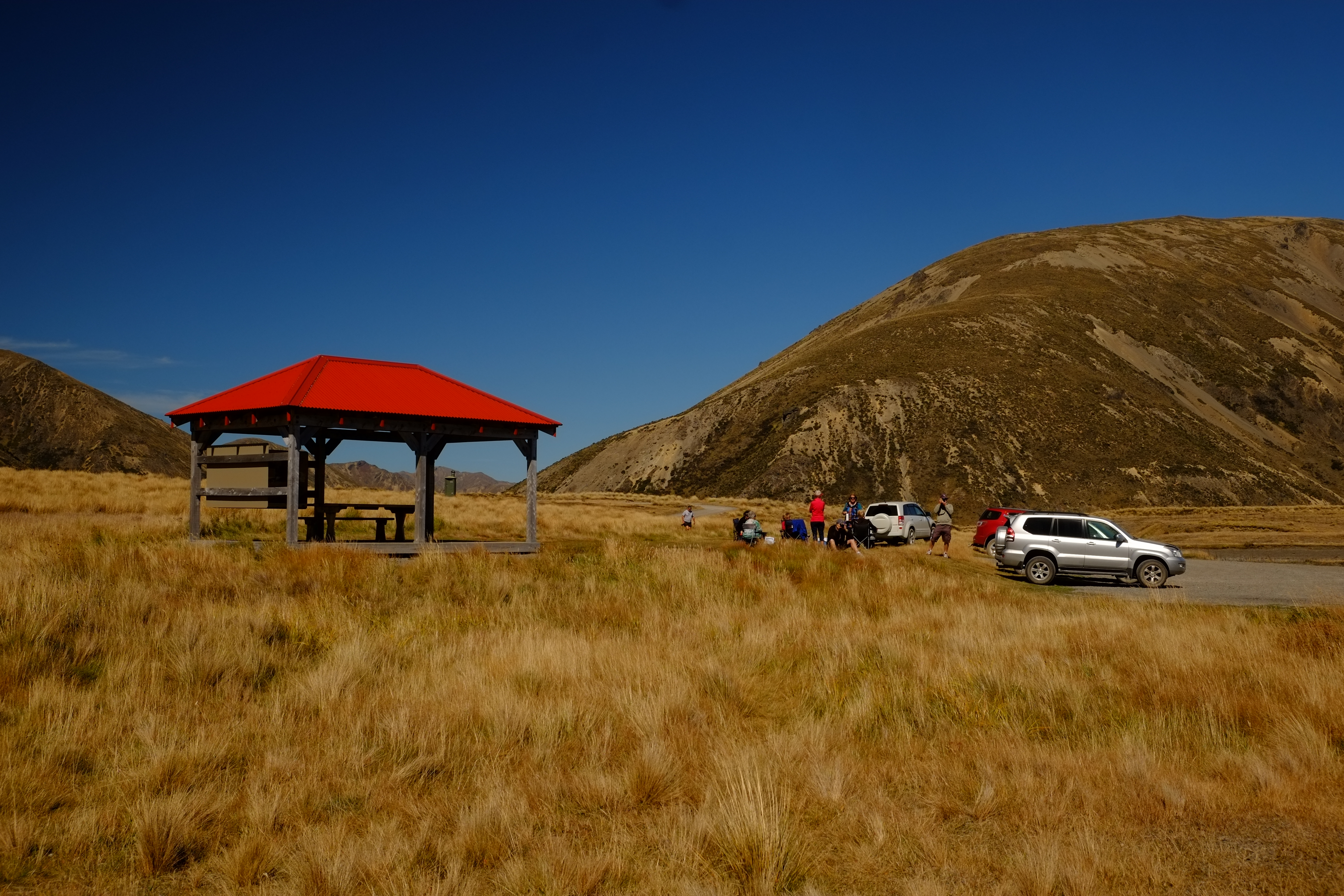
Camping shelter at Lake Tennyson

The small glacial lake is 1,102 metres (3,615 ft) above sea level. A broad moraine with a number of tarns (i.e. mountain pools) forms the downstream side of the lake. There is a basic camp ground provided by the Department of Conservation next to the lake, free to use on a first come, first served basis. The lake's perimeter is approximately 7.5 kilometres (4.7 mi) and can be walked, but wading in the lake is required in places.

== Location ==
Lake Tennyson is located within the headwaters of the Clarence River; the river flows through the lake. Lake Tennyson is framed by the St James Range to the west, and the Crimea Range to the east.

Lake Tennyson is part of Molesworth Station, New Zealand's largest farm. Access from Hanmer Springs (43 kilometres or 27 miles) is on Clarence Valley Road via Jacks Pass, and then Tophouse Road along the Clarence River to the Maling Pass car park. The Clarence River is crossed via bridge at the car park and after a short drive on the Rainbow Road, the access road to the lake is signposted on the left. This route is suitable for two-wheel drives.

The alternative access is from Saint Arnaud (75 kilometres or 47 miles). Just east of the township, the route turns right off State Highway 63 onto Rainbow Road (also known as Wairau–Hanmer Springs Hydro Road). This route follows the Wairau River to Island Saddle, which is New Zealand's highest legal road at 1,347 metres (4,419 ft). From there, it is 5.5 kilometres (3.4 mi) to the turn off to Lake Tennyson. This road is suitable for four-wheel drive vehicles only, has seasonal access restrictions, and a toll applies that is payable at Rainbow Station.

The Maling Pass car park in close proximity to Lake Tennyson is the most common start point for those who want to explore the St James Cycle Trail.
