= Gloster River =

Coordinates: 42°16′S 173°18′E

Location
- Country: New Zealand

Physical characteristics
- Source
  - location: Inland Kaikōura Range
- Mouth
  - location: Waiau Toa / Clarence River

The Gloster River is a river in the Marlborough region of New Zealand. It arises on the northern slope of Dillon Cone in the Inland Kaikōura Range and flows north, then south-east and east to join the Waiau Toa / Clarence River which eventually exits into the Pacific Ocean.

In 1888, the Gloster River formed a boundary between the counties of Marlborough and Kaikoura.

== See also ==
- List of rivers of New Zealand
