= Waiau Toa / Clarence River =

River in Canterbury, New Zealand

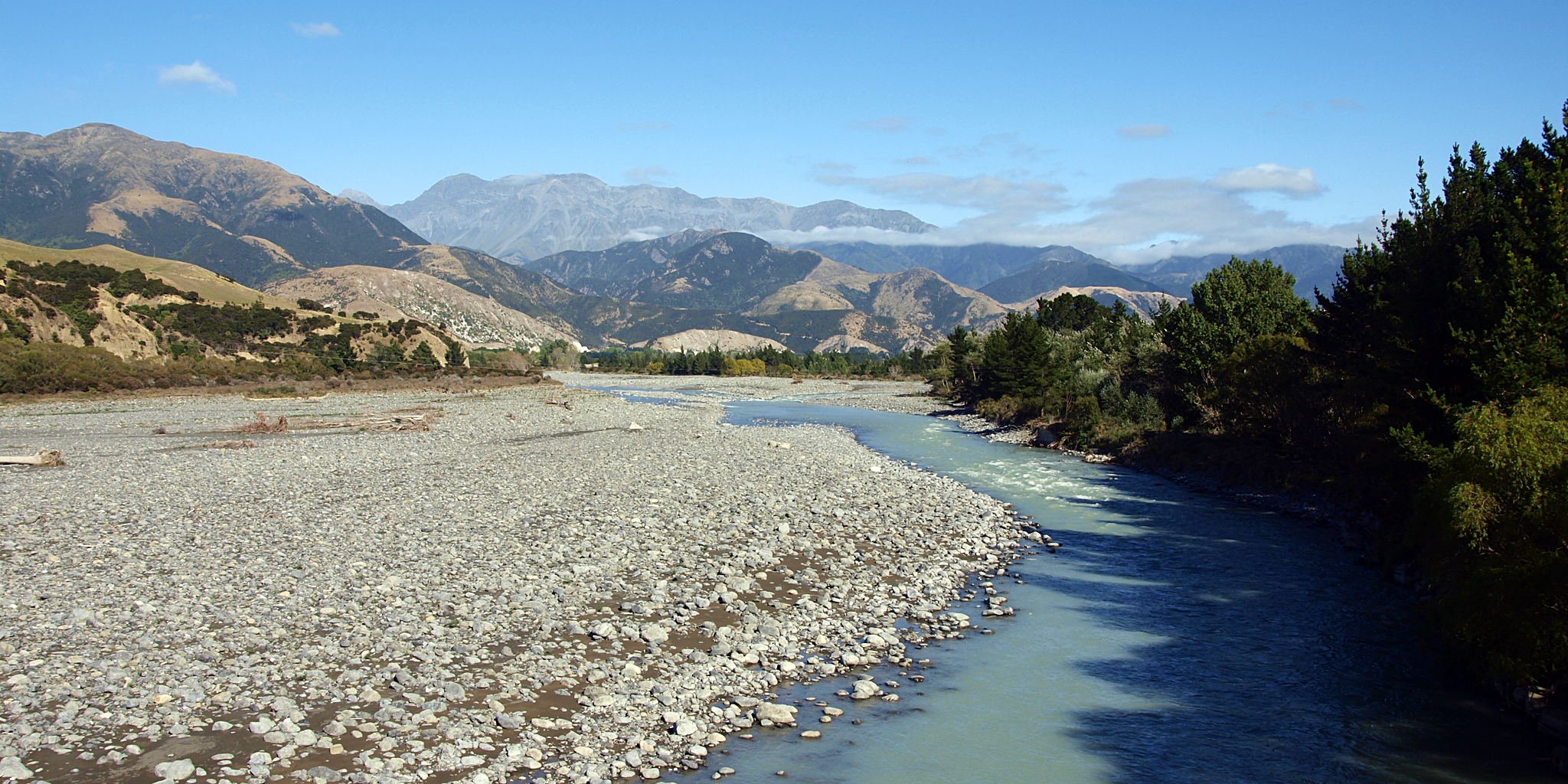
- The Waiau Toa / Clarence River, as viewed from State Highway 1 near the river's mouth

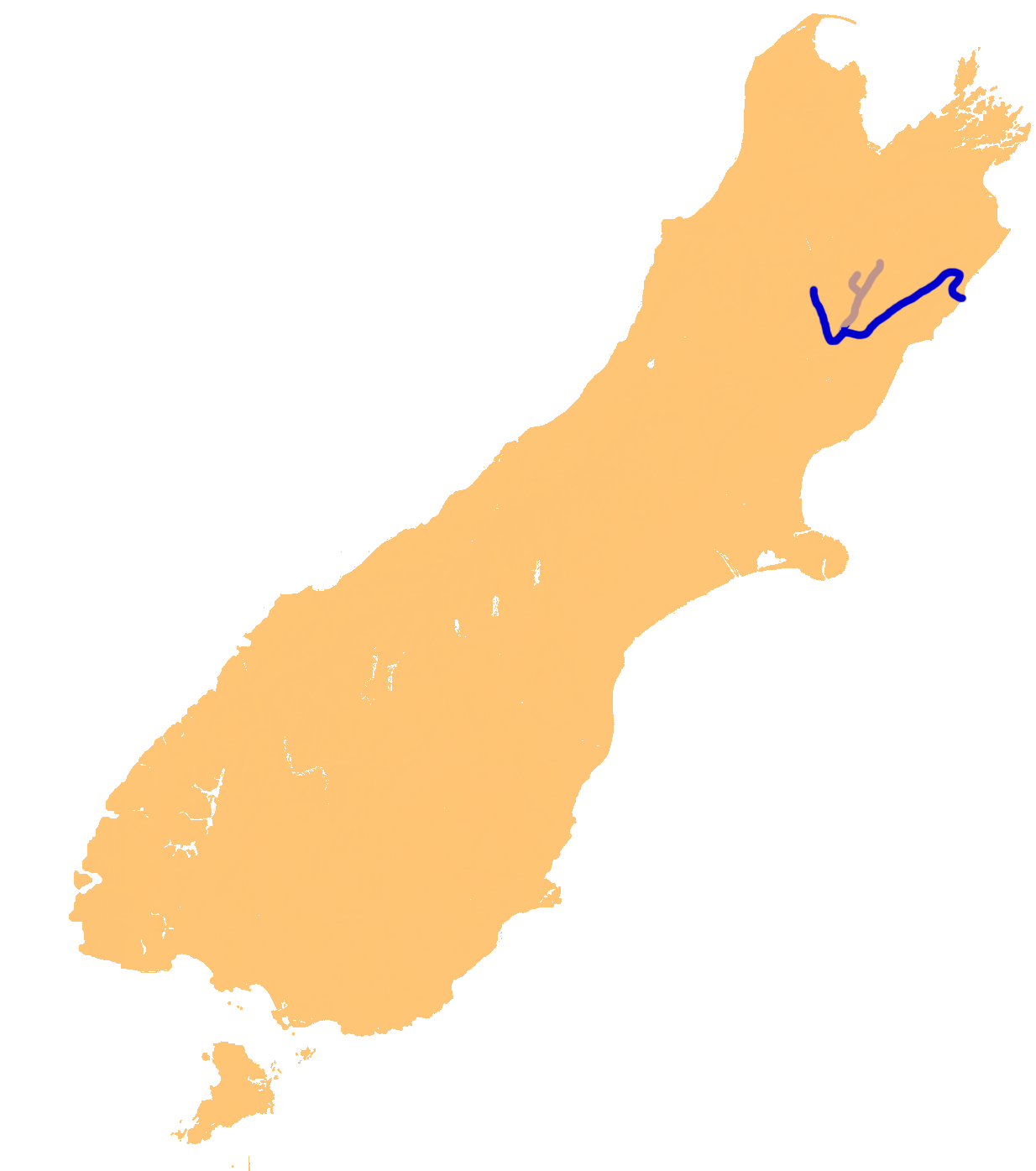
- The Waiau Toa / Clarence River system.
- Native name: Waiau Toa (Māori)

Location
- Country: New Zealand
- Regions: Canterbury, Marlborough

Physical characteristics
- Source: Clarence Pass
  - location: Spenser Mountains
  - coordinates: 42°6′14″S 172°42′58″E
- Mouth: Pacific Ocean
  - location: Clarence
  - coordinates: 42°10′S 173°57′E
  - elevation: Sea level
- Length: 209 km (130 mi)

Basin features
- Tributaries
  - left: Acheron River, Dillon River, Gloster River, Bluff River
  - right: Styx River, Hossack River, Tweed River
- Waterbodies: Lake Tennyson

The Clarence River (Māori: Waiau Toa; officially Waiau Toa / Clarence River) is a major river which flows through the Kaikōura Ranges in the northeast of New Zealand's South Island. At roughly 209 kilometres (130 mi) long, it is the longest river in Canterbury and the eighth longest in New Zealand.

For its first 50 kilometres (31 mi), the river runs in a generally southeastern direction. It then turns northeast, running down a long straight valley between the Inland and Seaward Kaikōura Ranges. At the end of the Seaward Kaikōuras, the river meanders through undulating hill country before draining into the Pacific Ocean near the town of Clarence. A large part of the river is within the boundaries of Molesworth Station.

The river and its tributaries cut through rock formed on the seafloor of the Pacific during the late Cretaceous through to the middle Eocene, during which period the majority of New Zealand was at points almost entirely submerged. This provides a useful record of this time period, and has contributed to our understanding of several events which took place during that era. The area also provides valuable insight into more recent geological events, having been heavily affected by the 2016 Kaikōura earthquake.

== History and name ==
The area around Waiau Toa has a long history of pre-European habitation and was once one of the most populated areas of the island, with multiple iwi having ties to the region. While archaeological evidence on the northern side of the river, such as a series of middens, suggests early habitation in the area by the Waitaha iwi, the earliest concrete evidence of permanent Māori habitation relates to a Kāti Māmoe pā at Waipapa on the southern side of the river mouth. A raid on the settlement at Waipapa by Rangitāne proved instrumental in expanding Māori settlement of the region, as a subsequent attack on Rangitāne by Ngāti Kurī led to the latter returning captives and marrying into the area. Following a breakdown of the relationship between Ngāti Mamoe and Ngāti Kurī, Waipapa was occupied by Ngāti Kurī, driving Ngāti Mamoe from the area and giving Ngāti Kurī mana whenua over the region to this day. Further settlements were then established in the area, including at the mouth of the Waiau Toa near a waka landing site.

The frequency with which the iwi local to Waiau Toa changed is partially related to its importance as a mahinga kai (food gathering place). The area traditionally provided a wide variety of food sources, including birds (such as kererū, tūī, and tītī), plants (such as harakeke, raupō, and kiekie), and seafood (such as pāua, kina and pipi). The river's floodplains provided ample fertile soil for the development of gardens, with a large agricultural community developing around the area's many pā farming crops including kūmara, which typically would not be able to grow so far south.

The Māori name for the river, Waiau Toa, points to a legend regarding this river and the nearby Waiau Uwha River. Both of these rivers have their sources on either side of the St James Range, (Note: The Waiau Uwha River originates in the adjacent Spenser Mountains range) separated by roughly 2 kilometres (1.2 mi), before flowing in different directions and ending 80 kilometres (50 mi) apart at their mouths. According to legend, the Waiau Toa and Waiau Uwha were lovers who for reasons unknown were turned into their respective rivers, with the increased flow from snow melt said to represent their weeping from being separated.

The origins of the European name for the river are unclear. The name 'Clarence River' was in use by 1851. It appears on an 1856 chart of the region alongside the Māori name, though this is believed to be a recording of an earlier name in honour of King William IV, who was the Duke of Clarence prior to his ascension to the throne – potentially by local politician and premier Frederick Weld. The European and Māori names for the river have been used interchangeably for much of the river's history following European settlement, and in 2018 the river was officially gazetted as Waiau Toa / Clarence River, becoming one of many New Zealand places to have a dual name.

== Geography ==
The Clarence River begins near Clarence Pass in the Spenser Mountains, just beyond the northern end of the Southern Alps. The upper river flows through Lake Tennyson before joining up with Princess Stream and Serpentine Creek and flowing south for roughly 25 kilometres (16 mi) towards Hanmer Springs. Upon reaching the Hanmer Range, the river turns and flows east for 10 kilometres (6.2 mi) and north for a further 8 kilometres (5.0 mi), taking the river towards Molesworth Station and its confluence with the Acheron River. From here, the Clarence enters a long, straight valley where it separates the Inland and Seaward Kaikōura Ranges, flowing roughly parallel to the coastline and Awatere River. This portion is popular with packrafters for the variety and remoteness it offers.

Towards the northern end of the Seaward Kaikōuras, the river turns towards the coast through a gorge historically known as the Sawtooth Gorge before opening to a narrow coastal plain. It then meanders back to the southwest along the eastern flank of the Seaward Kaikōuras as a braided river for around 12 kilometres (7.5 mi) before turning once more to the southeast and emptying into the Pacific Ocean. In total, the river has a length of roughly 209 kilometres (130 mi), making it the 8th longest river in New Zealand.

Northern tributaries along the middle segment of the Clarence River (e.g., Mead Stream, Dee Stream, Branch Stream, Muzzle Stream) cut through an uplifted, folded and rotated block of limestone and marl that accumulated on the seafloor from the late Cretaceous through the Paleocene and middle Eocene (75–45 million years ago). Exposures of this limestone—the Amuri Limestone—provide some of the most complete records for this time interval of Earth's history. They have provided important insights to our understanding of the Paleocene-Eocene Thermal Maximum (PETM), Eocene Thermal Maximum 2 (ETM-2), and other Paleogene hyperthermal events.

The geography of the Clarence is also affected by New Zealand's frequent earthquakes. In the aftermath of the 2016 Kaikōura earthquake, a slip blocked the Clarence River 10 to 12 kilometres (6.2–7.5 mi) from its mouth, causing a buildup of water behind it. Due to the risk of flash flooding downstream, residents below the slip were evacuated. The river broke through the debris 16 hours after it occurred.

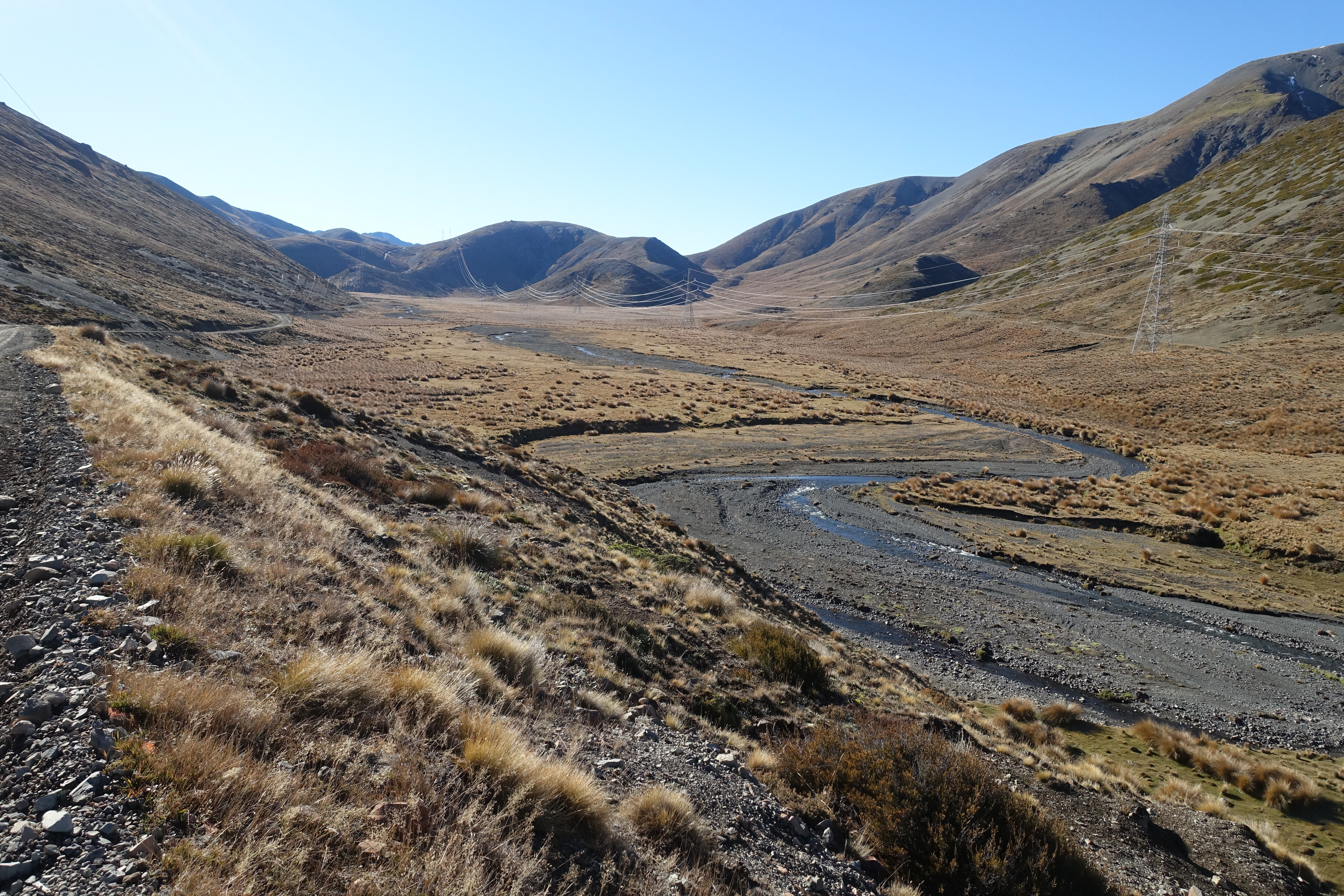
Upper reaches of the Clarence River

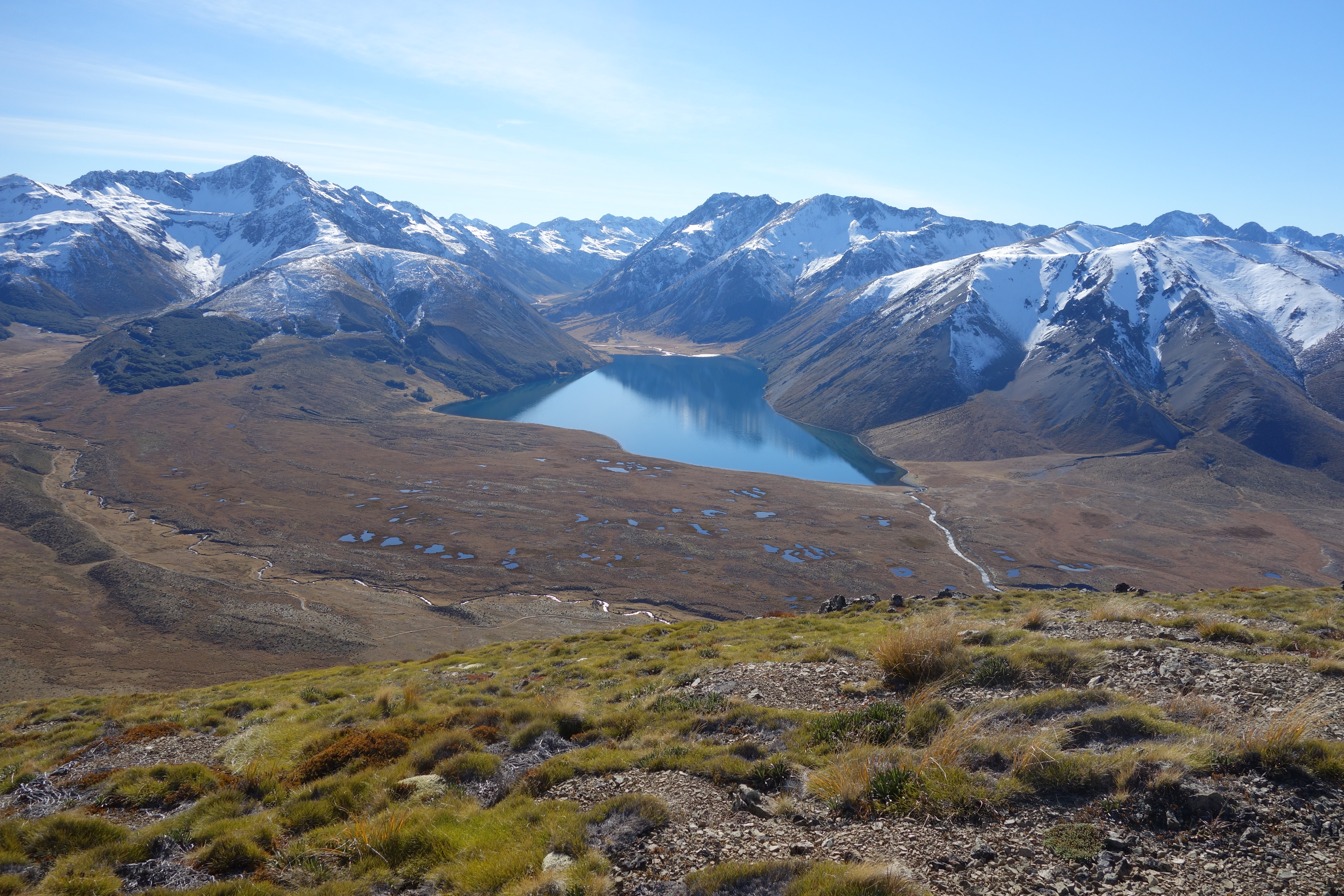
Lake Tennyson as seen from the south

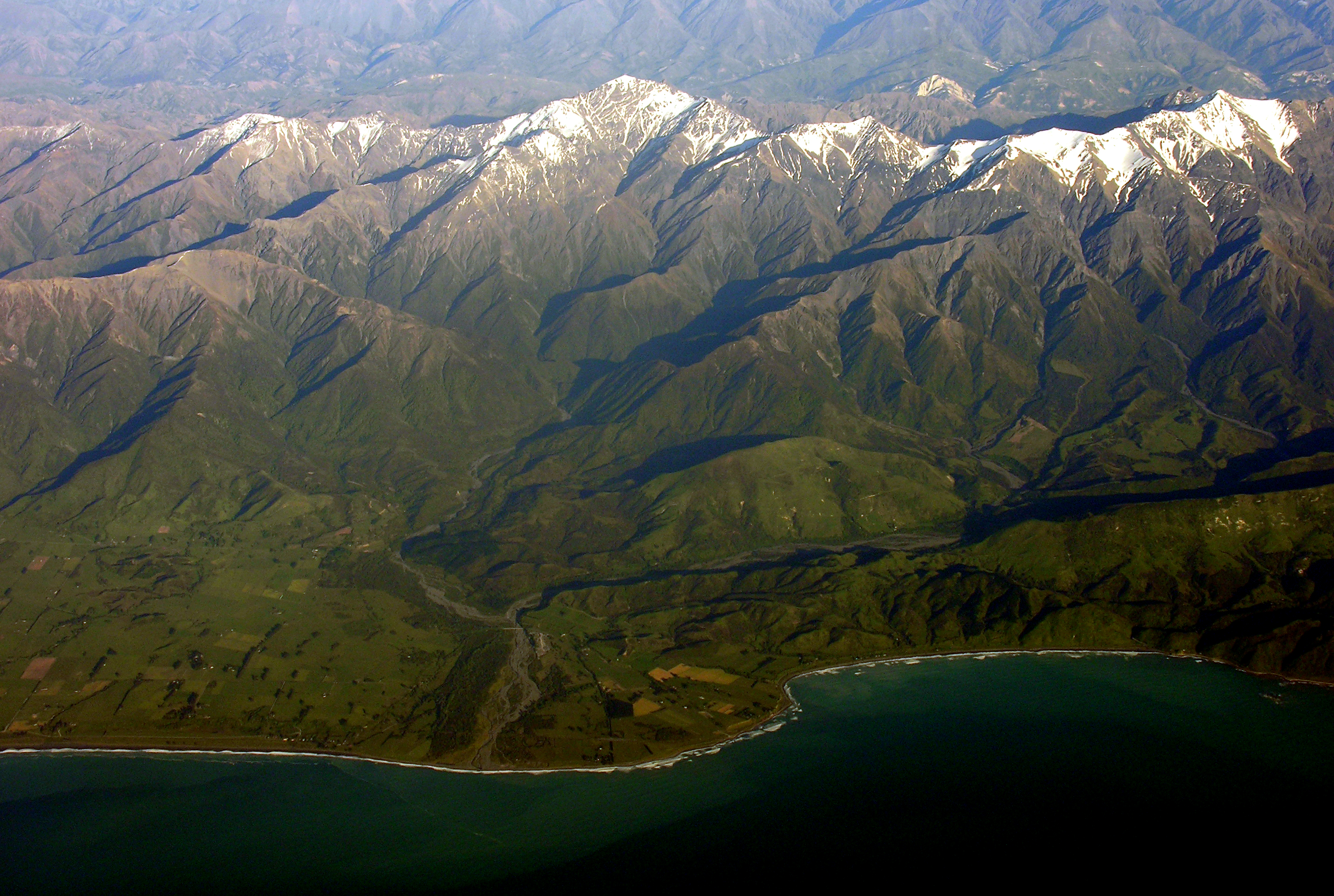
Mouth of the Clarence River in front of the Kaikōura Ranges
