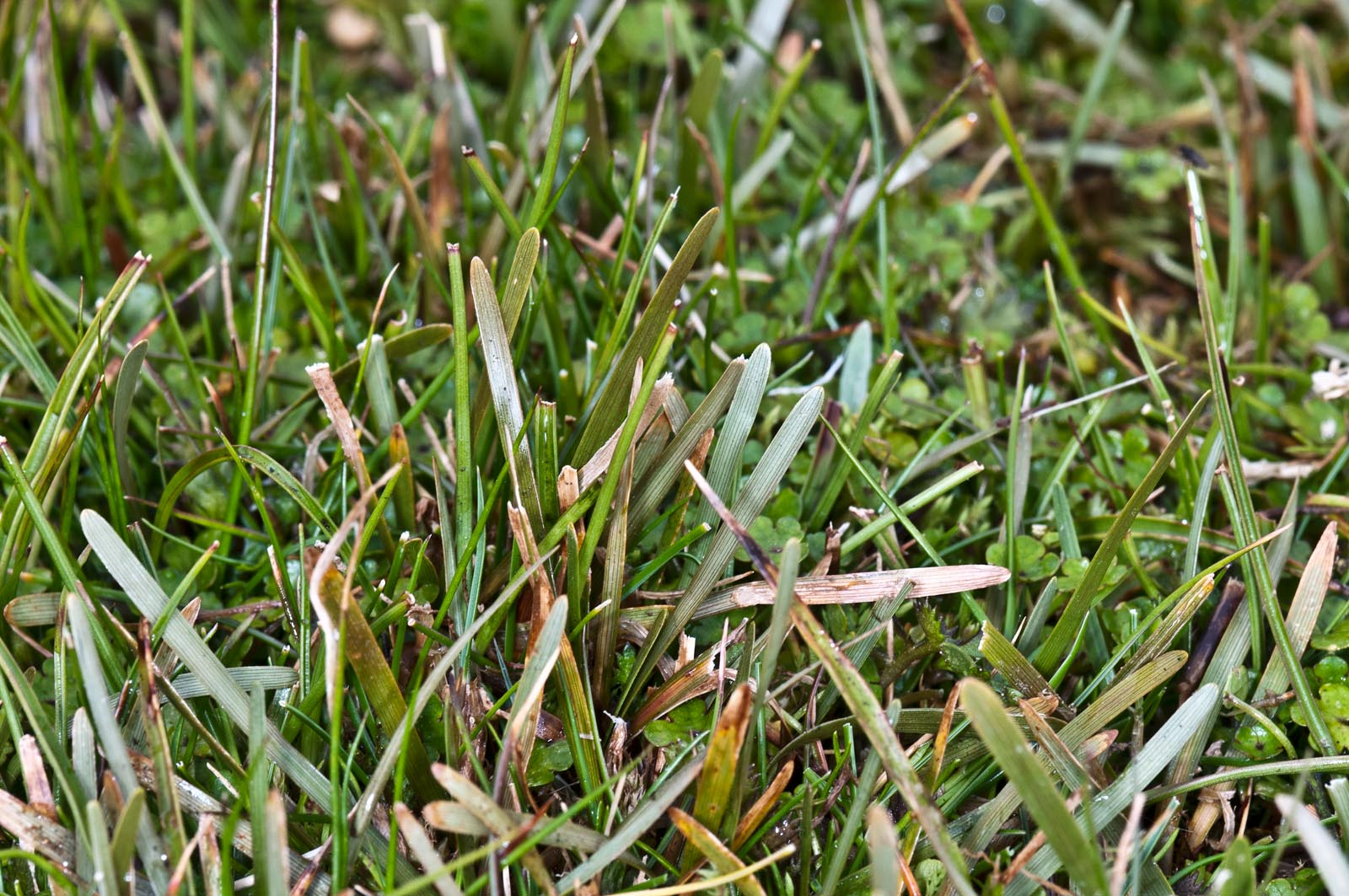

Conservation status
- Declining (NZ TCS)

Scientific classification
- Kingdom: Plantae
- Clade: Tracheophytes
- Clade: Angiosperms
- Clade: Monocots
- Clade: Commelinids
- Order: Poales
- Family: Cyperaceae
- Genus: Carex
- Species: C. talbotii

Binomial name
- Carex talbotii Kottaim.
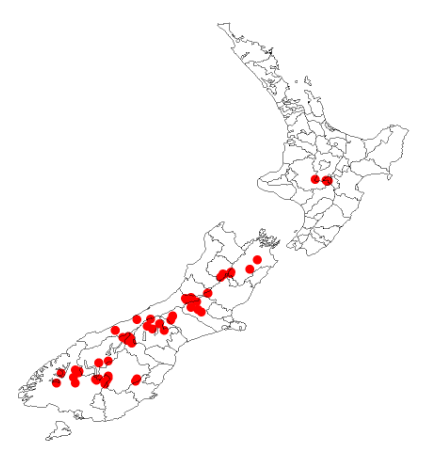
- Occurrence data from AVH

Synonyms
- Carex berggrenii Petrie

= Carex talbotii =

Species of grass-like plant

Carex talbotii, common name Berggren's sedge, is a species of sedge in the family Cyperaceae. It is endemic to New Zealand, being found on both the North and the South Islands.

== Description ==
It is a small, tufted, dark red-purple or orange-red sedge. Its smooth culms (circular in cross-section) are 15-30 mm long are flattened above, and almost enclosed by light brown sheaths. The linear, almost flat leaves are 30-60 mm by 1-2.5-3 mm, with distinct nerves, and blunt apices. The terminal spike is male (on a peduncle) with the remaining sessile (or almost sessile) spikes being female, and crowded around the base of the male spike. The bracts which subtend the inflorescence are longer than it.

It flowers from October to February and fruits from October to June, and the nuts are dispersed by granivory and wind.

== Distribution and habitat ==
It is found in the Central Ranges of the North Island. In the South Island, it is found generally easterly from Lake Tennyson south. It is a montane to subalpine wetland species growing on the margins of lakes and streams.

== Conservation status ==
Assessments under the New Zealand Threat Classification System (NZTCS), declared it to be "At Risk – Naturally Uncommon" (NU) in 2013, and in 2017 to be "At Risk - Declining" (Dec).

== Gallery ==
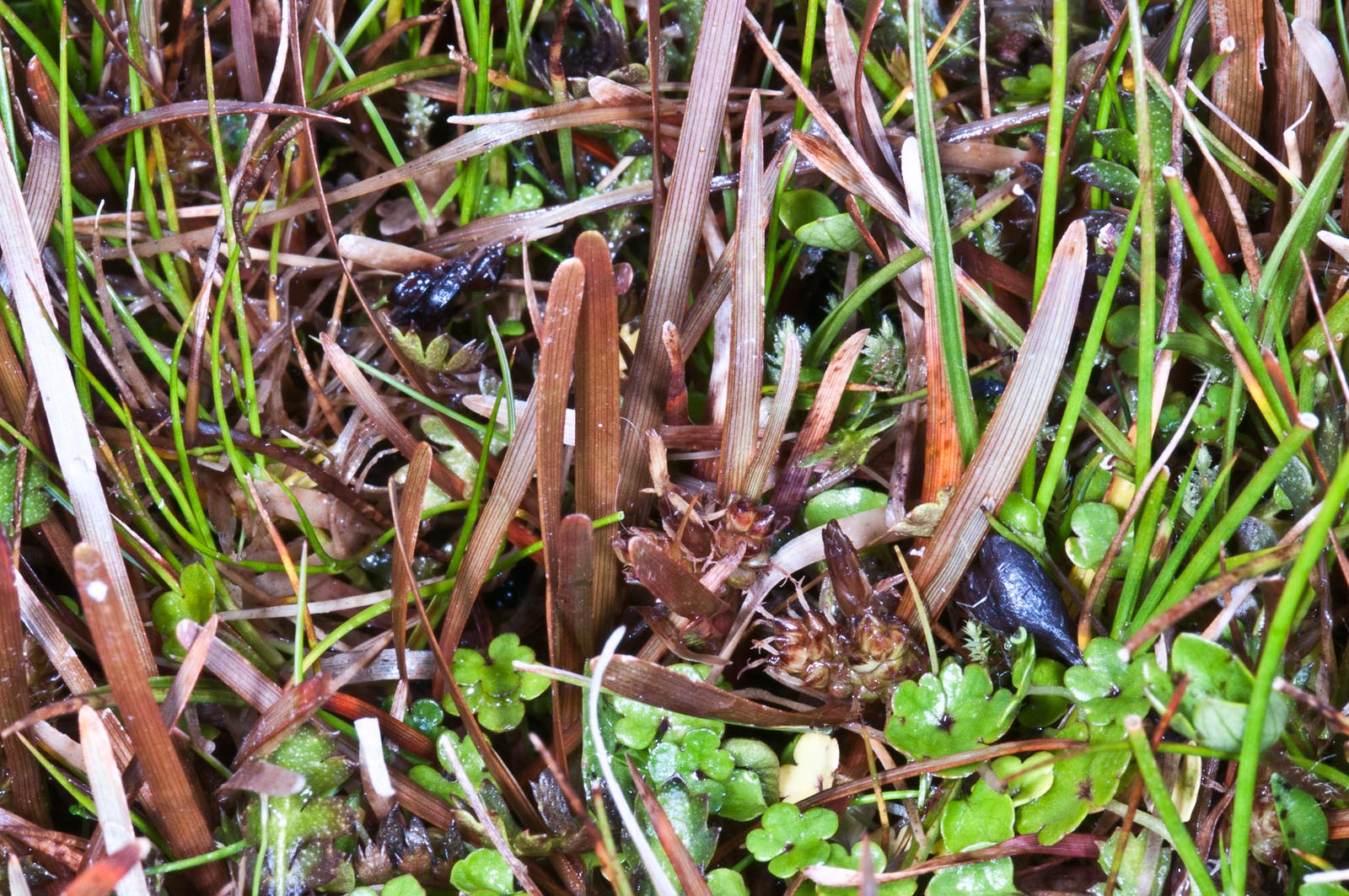
AM AK

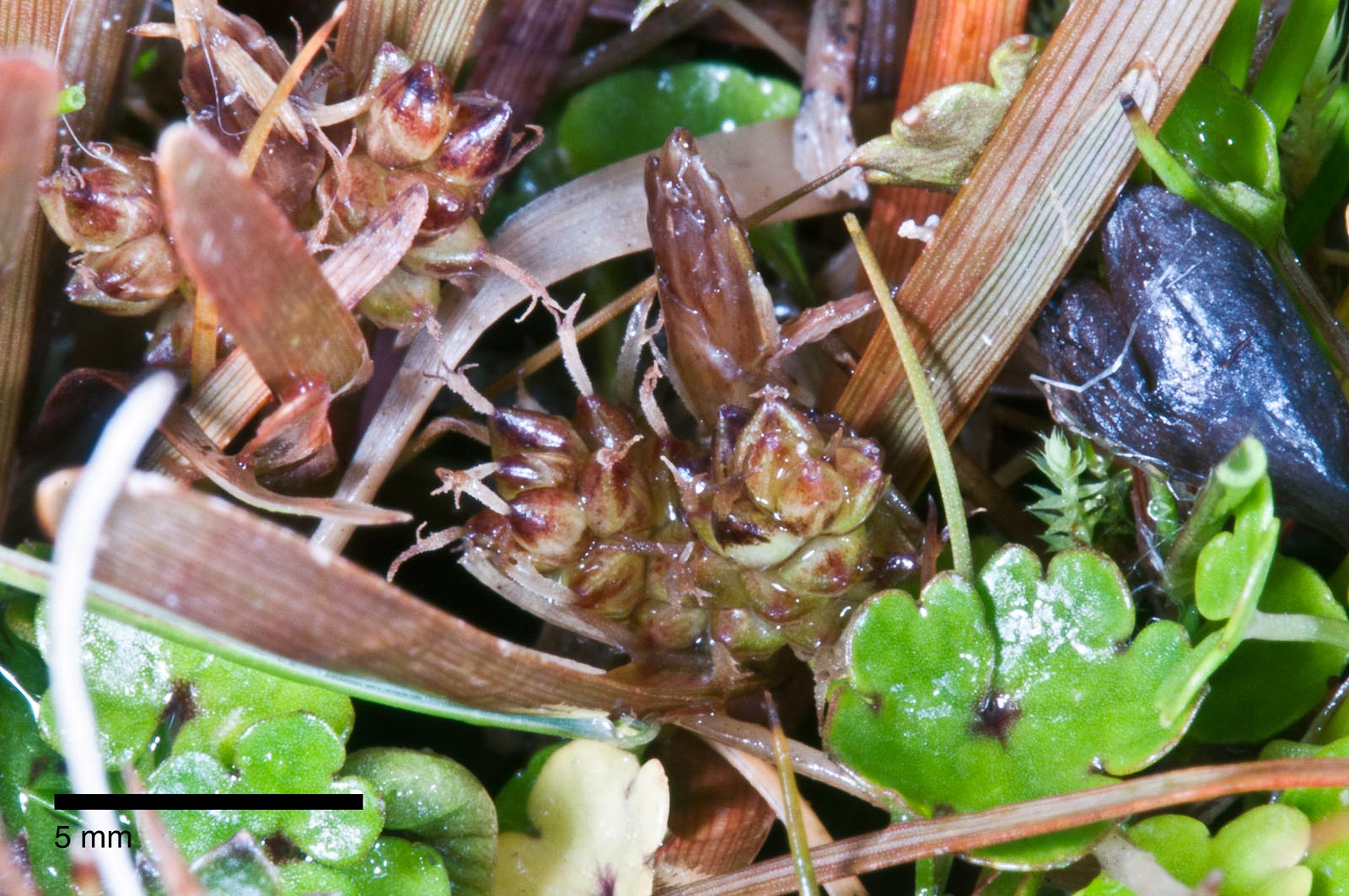
AM AK

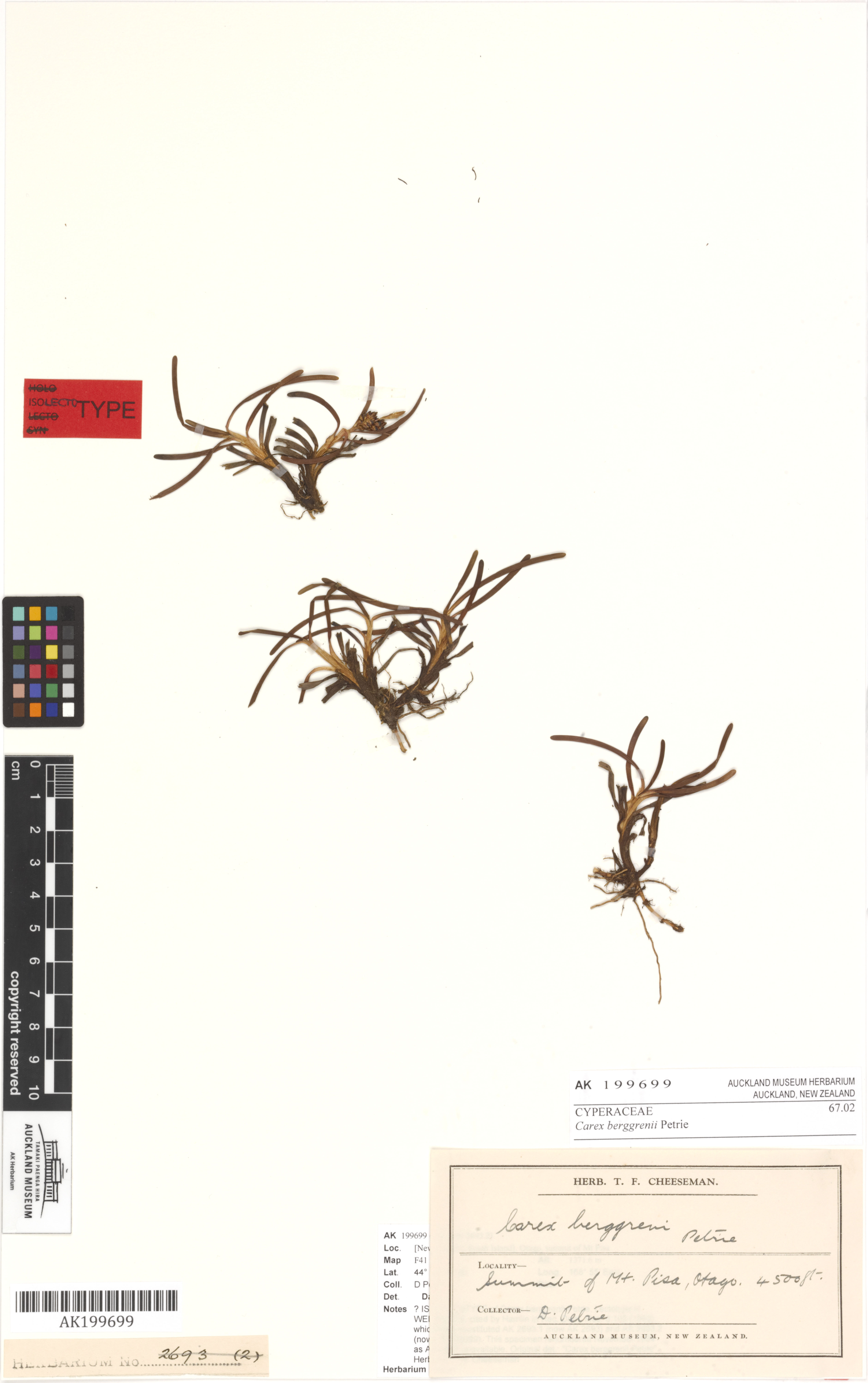
Isolectotype: AM AK
