= Styx River (North Canterbury) =

Coordinates: 42.445378°S 172.799474°E

- Location of the mouth within New Zealand

Location
- Country: New Zealand

Physical characteristics
- Mouth
  - location: Waiau Toa / Clarence River
- Length: 7 km (4 mi)

Styx River is in the north of the Canterbury region of New Zealand. It flows east for 7 kilometres (4 mi) into the Waiau Toa / Clarence River, 9 kilometres (6 mi) north west of Hanmer Springs.
