= Bluff River (New Zealand) =

Coordinates: 42°10′S 173°32′E

Location
- Country: New Zealand

Physical characteristics
- Source
  - location: Inland Kaikoura Range
- Mouth
  - location: Waiau Toa / Clarence River
- Length: 10 km (6.2 mi)

The Bluff River is a river of New Zealand. It is in the Canterbury Region and is a tributary of the Waiau Toa / Clarence River. The Bluff River flows south for 10 kilometres (6 mi) from the slopes of Mount Major in the Inland Kaikōura Range. Confusingly, the Bluff Stream, another tributary of the Waiau Toa / Clarence, follows a largely parallel course 5 kilometres (3 mi) to the east.

== See also ==
- List of rivers of New Zealand
