= Dillon Cone =

Hill in New Zealand

Coordinates: 42°16′20″S 173°13′26″E

Dillon Cone is a hill in the south Marlborough region of the country of New Zealand with an elevation of 1,331 metres (4,367 ft) above sea level. It is the 24th highest mountain in Marlborough and the 439th highest mountain in New Zealand.
