= Rainbow Road (New Zealand) =

Mountain road in the South Island of New Zealand

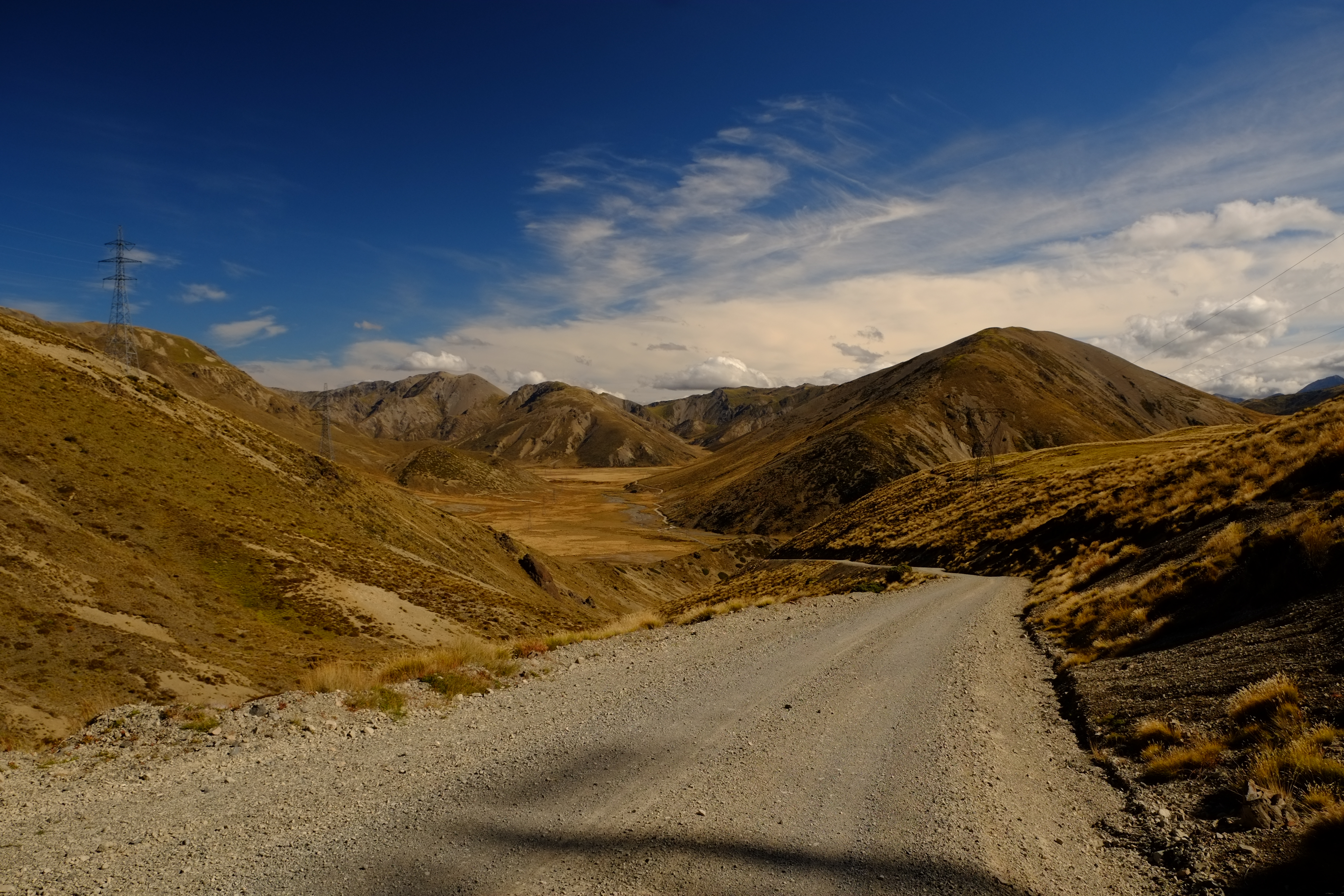
View from Island Saddle

Rainbow Road is an unsealed back-country road in New Zealand. It runs for 112 kilometres (70 mi) from Hanmer Springs in Canterbury to Saint Arnaud in the Nelson Region, but for much of its length it is located in the Marlborough Region. The official name of the road is Rainbow Valley–Hanmer Road.

== History ==
Rainbow Road was built during the 1950s when a high-voltage power transmission line was built to supply the Nelson Region and Buller District with electricity. After the 2016 Kaikōura earthquake closed State Highway 1 along the Kaikōura Coast, the idea was mooted to upgrade Rainbow Road as an inland state highway alternative, but nothing came of this.

== Description ==
The terrain is rugged and the road has not been built to any particular engineering standard, but is there to give maintenance vehicles access to the power pylons. The road is open to the public from 26 December until Easter Monday each year. When using a GPS, it may give Rainbow Road as the most direct link from Christchurch to the city of Nelson, as it is the shortest link, and this sometimes catches out tourists unaware of the conditions in New Zealand's back-country. Under good conditions, it takes a 4WD vehicle about three hours to drive the 112 km. Island Saddle is the highest point on the route at 1,347 metres (4,419 ft), and this is New Zealand's highest public road. Part of the road crosses private land at the Rainbow Station, and the leaseholder charges an access fee of NZ$40 per 4WD, NZ$20 per motorbike, and NZ$5 per mountain bike. Access to the road outside of the season can be arranged through the farm manager at Rainbow Station.

== Rainbow Rage mountain bike race ==
The Rainbow road was home to the Rainbow Rage mountain bike race. Twenty One editions were raced since 1996 with over 1600 competitors racing in the most popular edition. The 106 kilometre event finished in Hanmer Springs and included the substantial climb over Island Saddle. The fastest time for males was ridden by Tom Filmer (3hours 26min 18sec), and Elina Ussher rode the fastest time (3hour 55min 38sec) of all female riders.
