= Island Saddle =

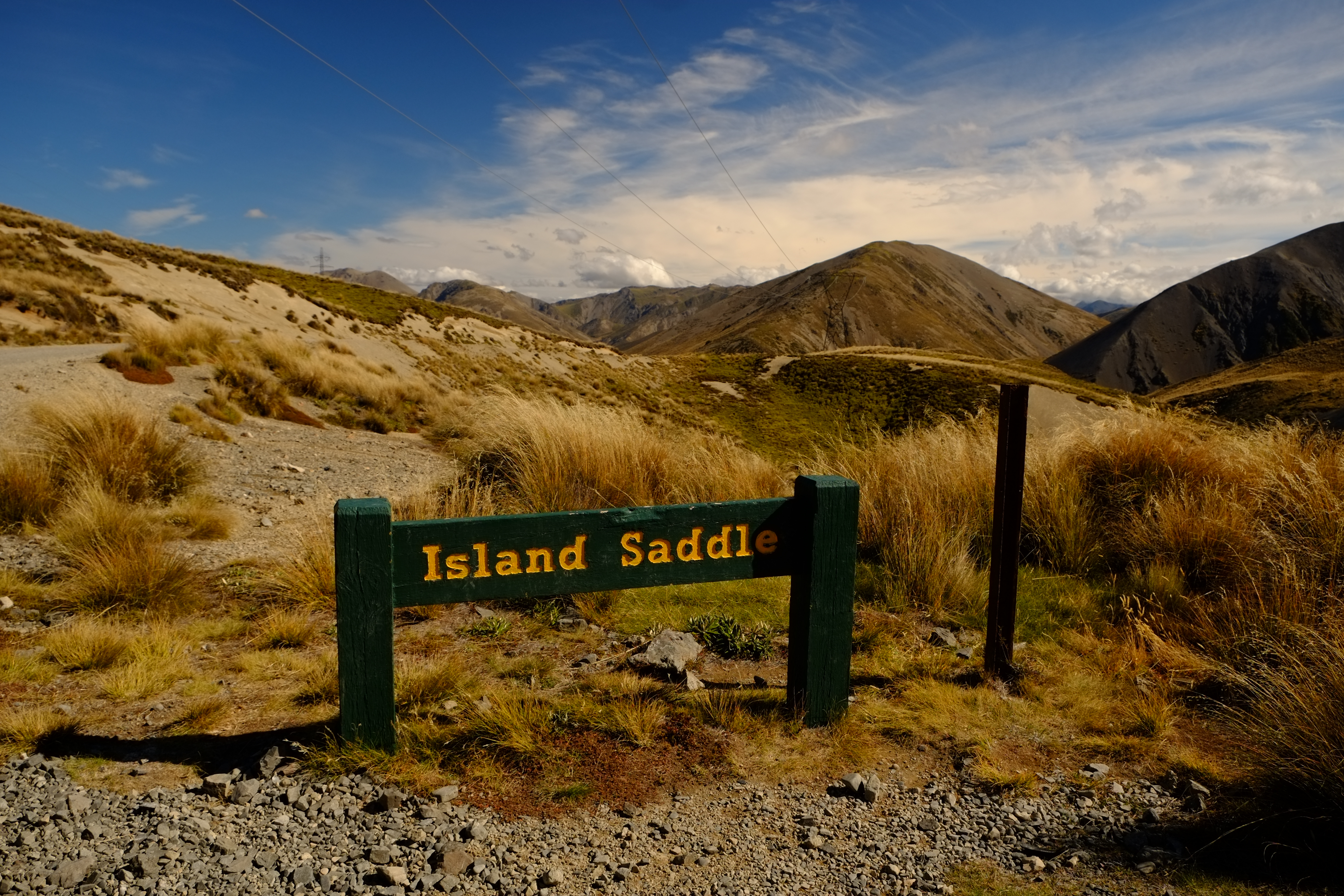
- Island Saddle
- Interactive map of Island Saddle
- Elevation: 1,347 metres (4,419 ft)
- Traversed by: Rainbow Valley–Hanmer Road

Third Approach
- Location: New Zealand
- Range: Crimea Range
- Coordinates: 42°10′34″S 172°47′35″E

Island Saddle (1,347 m or 4,419 ft above sea level) is an alpine pass that is located in the Crimea Range in Canterbury, New Zealand. The pass is on the Rainbow Valley–Hanmer Road, commonly known as the Rainbow Road. Island Saddle is New Zealand's highest public road.

== Climate ==
Climate data for Island Saddle (Modelled)
Month	Jan	Feb	Mar	Apr	May	Jun	Jul	Aug	Sep	Oct	Nov	Dec	Year
Mean daily maximum °C (°F)	15.0 (59.0)	16.0 (60.8)	14.0 (57.2)	11.0 (51.8)	7.0 (44.6)	4.0 (39.2)	3.0 (37.4)	3.0 (37.4)	4.0 (39.2)	7.0 (44.6)	10.0 (50.0)	13.0 (55.4)	8.9 (48.1)
Daily mean °C (°F)	10.0 (50.0)	11.0 (51.8)	9.0 (48.2)	6.5 (43.7)	3.5 (38.3)	1.0 (33.8)	0.0 (32.0)	0.0 (32.0)	1.0 (33.8)	3.0 (37.4)	5.5 (41.9)	8.5 (47.3)	4.9 (40.9)
Mean daily minimum °C (°F)	5.0 (41.0)	6.0 (42.8)	4.0 (39.2)	2.0 (35.6)	0.0 (32.0)	−2.0 (28.4)	−3.0 (26.6)	−3.0 (26.6)	−2.0 (28.4)	−1.0 (30.2)	1.0 (33.8)	4.0 (39.2)	0.9 (33.7)
Average precipitation mm (inches)	62 (2.4)	60 (2.4)	70 (2.8)	65 (2.6)	78 (3.1)	90 (3.5)	85 (3.3)	85 (3.3)	69 (2.7)	81 (3.2)	73 (2.9)	71 (2.8)	889 (35)
Source: Meteoblue.com (Modelled)
