= Hanmer Springs =

Town in the South Island of New Zealand

Hanmer Springs Te Whakatakanga o te ngārahu o te ahi a Tamatea (Māori)
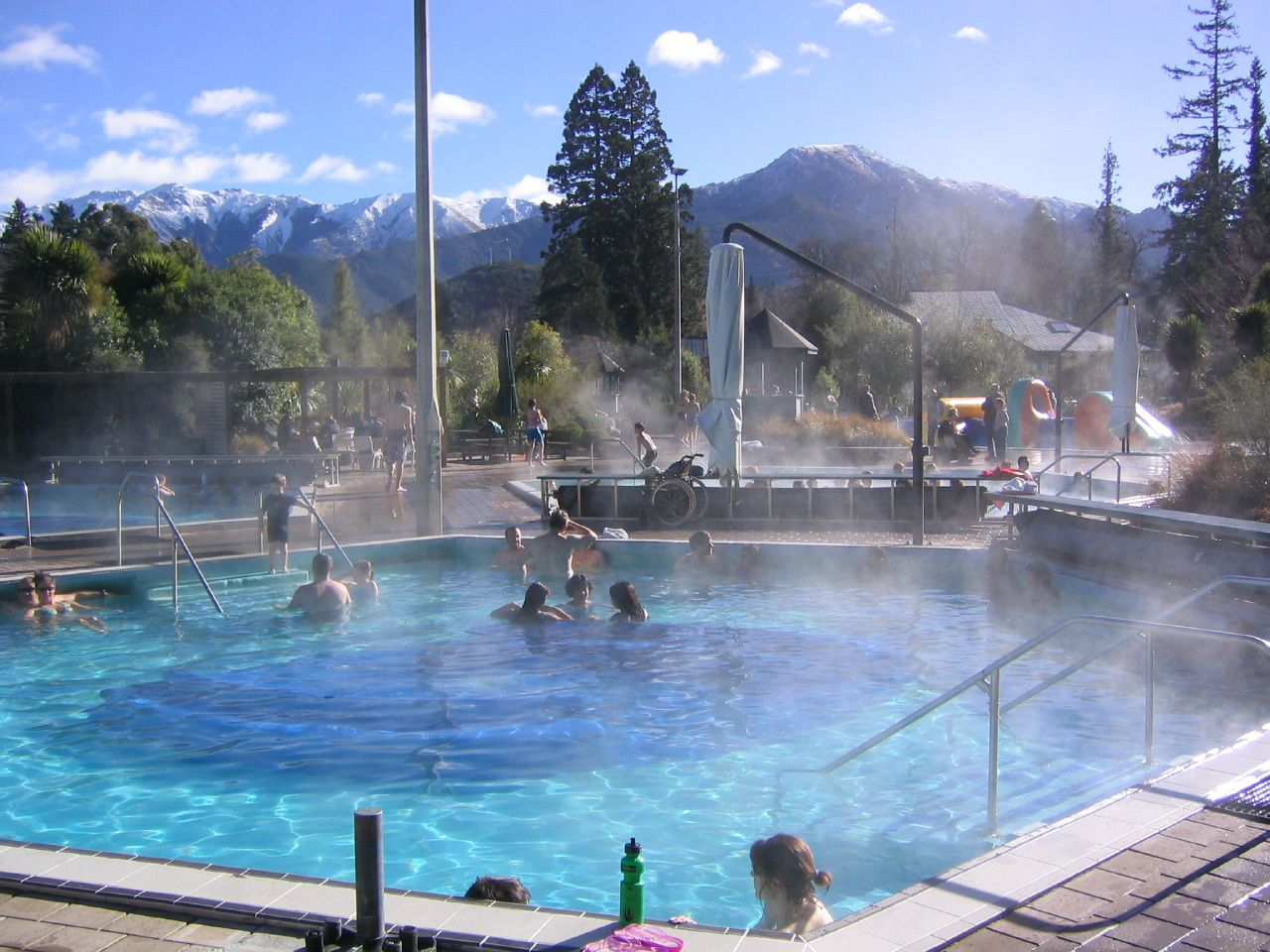
- Hot pools at Hanmer Springs in 2004
- Interactive map of Hanmer Springs
- Coordinates: 42°31′20″S 172°49′47″E
- Country: New Zealand
- Region: Canterbury
- District: Hurunui
- Community board: Hanmer Springs Community Board
- Ward: West Ward
- Electorates: Kaikōura; Te Tai Tonga

Government
  - Territorial Authority: Hurunui District Council
  - Regional council: Environment Canterbury
  - Mayor of Hurunui: Marie Black
  - Kaikoura MP: Stuart Smith
  - Te Tai Tonga MP: Tākuta Ferris

Area
  - Total: 4.01 km^{2} (1.55 sq mi)
- Elevation (NZHR, Airport): 338 m (1,109 ft)

Population (June 2025)
  - Total: 1,090
  - Density: 272/km^{2} (704/sq mi)
- Postcode: 7334

Hanmer Springs is a small town in the Canterbury region of the South Island of New Zealand, known for its hot pools. The Māori name for Hanmer Springs is Te Whakatakanga o te ngārahu o te ahi a Tamatea, which means "where the ashes of Tamatea's fire lay", referring to Tamatea, the captain of the canoe Tākitimu.

Hanmer Springs is located 130 kilometres (81 mi) north-west of Christchurch and 65 km (40 mi) south-west of Kaikōura (135 km (84 mi) by road), in the Hurunui District. The town lies on a minor road 9 km (5.6 mi) north of State Highway 7, the northern route between Christchurch and the West Coast via Lewis Pass. The township lies at the base of Conical Hill. Mount Isobel (1,324 m (4,344 ft)) looks over Hanmer Springs. Jacks Pass and Jollies Pass provide access to the Molesworth and Rainbow roads.

== Toponymy ==
The town is named after Thomas Hanmer, an owner of Hawkeswood Station near the Conway River during the 1850s. Thomas Hanmer was born in Hanmer, Wales. He arrived to Lyttelton Harbour in 1852. While searching for suitable farming land, he joined a party of surveyors working in the Amuri District. During this period he was linked with Hanmer Springs, although he never lived there. He was the manager of the St Leonards Station near Culverden from 1855 to 1857. He then moved to Queensland, Australia. There is a statue of Thomas Hanmer in the centre of Hanmer Springs.

The Ngāi Tahu name for the springs in the Māori language is Te Whakatakanga o te ngārahu o te ahi a Tamatea, meaning "where the ashes of Tamatea's fire lay". The origin of the name is a legend of the ancestor Tamatea Pokai Whenua whose waka Takitimu capsized off the coast of the lower South Island. Tamatea Pokai Whenua and his party trekked north up the east coast of the South Island in freezing conditions. At the mountains that are now called Banks Peninsula, Tamatea recited a karakia (incantation), calling on the tohunga (traditional priests) in the North Island for help. The tohunga sent flames from the North Island volcanoes to warm them. As the flames travelled down from the volcanoes to Tamatea in the South Island, some flames fell along the way, creating the hot springs at the place we now know as Hanmer Springs.

== History ==
=== Access to the springs ===
In April 1859, the Lyttelton Times published a report about the hot springs by William Jones of St Leonard's station. He described seven circular pools ranging in diameter from 0.91 m (3 ft) up to 6.4–7.3 m (7–8 yd) with water temperatures varying from warm to almost boiling. In 1860, the Nelson Provincial Government, responsible for the region at the time, designated a reserve, covering 1,040 ha (2,560 acres) of land surrounding the springs. Access to the general area was provided by a bridge over the Waiau Uwha River in 1864, constructed by a Mr Handisides of Nelson for NZ£2,000 to a design by John Blackett. The bridge lasted only ten years before it was blown over by a Nor'west wind.

John Turnbull Thomson surveyed the land for the township in 1879, with the total area comprising 1,000 hectares (2,500 acres), of which 120 hectares (300 acres) were for the township itself. The hot springs were not included within that area. The springs themselves were still in their natural state at that time, with only steps and a changing shed provided. The member for Ashburton, Edward George Wright, brought up the question of developing the township in the New Zealand House of Representatives in June 1882. The Minister of Lands, William Rolleston, replied that it was important that the public should retain access to the springs. Surveyor Walter Kitson was instructed with laying out the site of the hot springs including an accommodation house. Construction of a bath house began in January 1884. The fifty year jubilee was held in 1933, stating that Hanmer had been a government resort since 1883, but the centenary book pointed out that the jubilee was held a year too early. The government investing significant funds into Hanmer Springs without a bridge crossing the Waiau Uwha River caused considerable controversy. Blackett designed a new bridge and John Anderson from Christchurch won the contract to erect it, and built a foundry at the site. This second bridge opened in 1887 and gives access to Hanmer to this day, with the structure registered as a Category I heritage item since 1983. The opening celebrations held by Anderson's sons at the site were rather liberal to the extent that the site is still known as Champagne Flat.

=== Queen Mary Hospital ===
The Queen Mary Hospital for Sick and Wounded Soldiers was built on the site of the government sanatorium in Hanmer Springs. It was designed to encourage fresh air and sunlight. The Soldiers' Block was opened on 3 June 1916 by the George Russell, the Minister of Public Health. The hospital remained under military control until 1922 when it was handed over to the Department of Health. Dr Percy Chisholm continued as the medical superintendent. The Chisholm Block was opened in 1926 to treat women with nervous disorders. The Nurses' Hostel was built in 1928 in a Georgian style. In the 1960s, it changed its focus to treat alcohol and drug dependency. It closed in 2003. In 2004 the Queen Mary Hospital (Former) and Hanmer Springs Thermal Reserve Historic Area was designated as a historic site by Heritage New Zealand Within that area three buildings, the Soldiers' Block, Nurses' Home and Chisholm Block, were given Category I protection by Heritage New Zealand in 2005. The premises were purchased by the Department of Conservation in 2008.

== Geology ==
The town of Hanmer Springs is located about midway along the north side of a rhomb-shaped topographic depression approximately 15 km (9.3 mi) long and 7 km (4.3 mi) wide. This depression is part of the Hanmer basin whose maximum dimensions are approximately 20 km (12 mi) by 10 km (6.2 mi). The basin floor lies at an elevation of 300–350 m (980–1,150 ft), being surrounded by ranges up to 1,000 m (3,300 ft) higher. The basin has formed on a bend of the active dextral strike-slip Hope Fault within the Marlborough fault system, with alluvial sediments derived from basement rocks filling the depression. Within the town a thermal spring provides hot water used for a bathing complex.

The fault system is part of the Pacific-Australia plate boundary zone between the westward subduction of the Pacific plate east of the North Island and the oblique strike-slip of the Alpine Fault in the South Island. Tectonically the basin is a pull-apart basin between the right step-over of two segments of the Hope Fault. The western part of the basin is under transtension and actively subsiding in response to north-south extension. The eastern part of the basin is undergoing transpression in response to north-south shortening caused by convergence in strike of the Hope Fault segments across the basin.

Seismic and gravity studies indicate a wedge-shaped profile with sediments filling the basin to a depth of more than 1,000 m (3,300 ft) along the southern margin of the basin and thinning to less than 300 m (980 ft) along the northern margin. An oblique normal fault, the Hanmer Fault, runs along the northern basin-floor margin and passes about 300 m (980 ft) south of the thermal spring in Hanmer Springs. The Hanmer Fault probably reflects large-scale upper crustal collapse of the hanging-wall side of the Hope Fault and is inferred to intersect with the Hope Fault at depth in the upper crust. Basin formation began in the mid-to-late Pleistocene based on extrapolation of average Late Pleistocene slip rates for the Hope Fault, lack of sediments older than Pleistocene, climatic factors and the faunal content of the sediments.

Underlying the basin sediments and forming the surrounding ranges are basement rocks of the Late Jurassic to Early Cretaceous Pahau Terrane. These rocks consist of indurated thin-to-medium bedded and commonly graded sandstone and mudstone, and also thick, poorly bedded sandstone, which are collectively (and loosely) termed greywacke. The Pahau Terrane greywacke has undergone low-grade metamorphism varying from zeolite facies to prehnite-pumpellyite facies. The overlying basement-derived sediments are alluvial/fluvial fan and terrace deposits consisting of poorly sorted sandy gravel, silt, peat and clay. Glacial deposits from Late Pleistocene are also recognised. The oldest sediments are probably mid-to-late Pleistocene coinciding with the beginning of the formation of the depression.

== Hot spring ==
The hot spring at Hanmer Springs is one of about 25 hot springs located parallel to the Alpine Fault and Marlborough fault system — adjacent to the central and northern parts of the Southern Alps.

Chemical analysis of these hot springs shows a range reflecting their various tectonic settings. Hanmer Springs is closer to the southern extent of the Hikurangi Trough and has a higher concentration of chlorine, boron, sodium, potassium, lithium, strontium and barium, compared to springs further to the southwest close to the Alpine Fault. Dissolved gases in the water at Hanmer Springs are mainly nitrogen and methane derived from organic material. Subducted waters rising in the accretionary complex associated with the Hikurangi Trough consist of: pore waters derived from compaction and dewatering of accreted and subducted sediments containing organic material; water released from dehydration of marine clays and seawater. This heated mixture is modified by mixing with surface meteoric waters and heated meteoric water that has also interacted with the greywacke at a depth of at least 2 km (6,600 ft) where water temperatures reach 180–200 °C (356–392 °F)

The high temperatures in the springs are attributed to rapid uplift of basement rocks that form the Southern Alps and nearby elevated regions. There is up to 10 mm (0.39 in) uplift each year along the central Alpine Fault region, reducing to between 2 and 5 mm (0.079 and 0.197 in) per year where the Hope Fault is located. The uplift is caused by the oblique collision between continental crust of the Australian plate west of the Alpine Fault, and continental crust of the Pacific plate. This collision is forcing the Pacific plate continental crust up the Alpine Fault plane and bending the edge of the Australian plate down under the weight of extra rock. The heat from uplifted basement rocks brought up to shallow levels may include minor amounts of heat generated by fault shearing.

The heated water, under pressure, rises up through faults and interconnected fractures losing heat by conduction and by mixing with cooler surface meteoric waters. When the water is discharged from the borehole at the Hanmer Springs thermal pools complex its temperature is 52 °C (126 °F). Since the spring's description in 1859, the natural upward flow of heated water has diminished and it is currently drawn from a borehole at about 70 m (230 ft) depth - depending on seasonal fluctuations. Heat exchangers cool the water down to a range of 32–42 °C (90–108 °F) for use in the bathing pools. The Hanmer Springs Thermal Pools Reserve Management Plan 2011 states that the draw-off of thermal water will be limited to 17.5 L (3.8 imp gal; 4.6 US gal) per second until the year 2039.

The thermal water from the springs contains methane gas. When the water is brought to the surface the gas is released. In the early period of the development of the springs, the gas was captured and stored for use in heating, lighting and cooking in the sanitorium. A gasometer installed in 1898 is listed as one of the historic items within the Queen Mary Hospital (Former) and Hanmer Springs Thermal Reserve Historic Area. In 2018, the pool complex commissioned a microturbine to generate electricity from the gas, reducing the electricity consumption of the complex, and avoiding the release of 100,000 cubic metres of methane into the atmosphere each year.

== Demographics ==
=== Hanmer Springs ===
Hanmer Springs is described by Stats NZ as a rural settlement and covers 4.01 km^{2} (1.55 sq mi). It had an estimated population of 1,090 as of June 2025, with a population density of 272 people per km^{2}.

Historical population for Hanmer Springs
Year	Pop.	±% p.a.
2006	729	—
2013	840	+2.05%
2018	966	+2.83%
2023	1,077	+2.20%

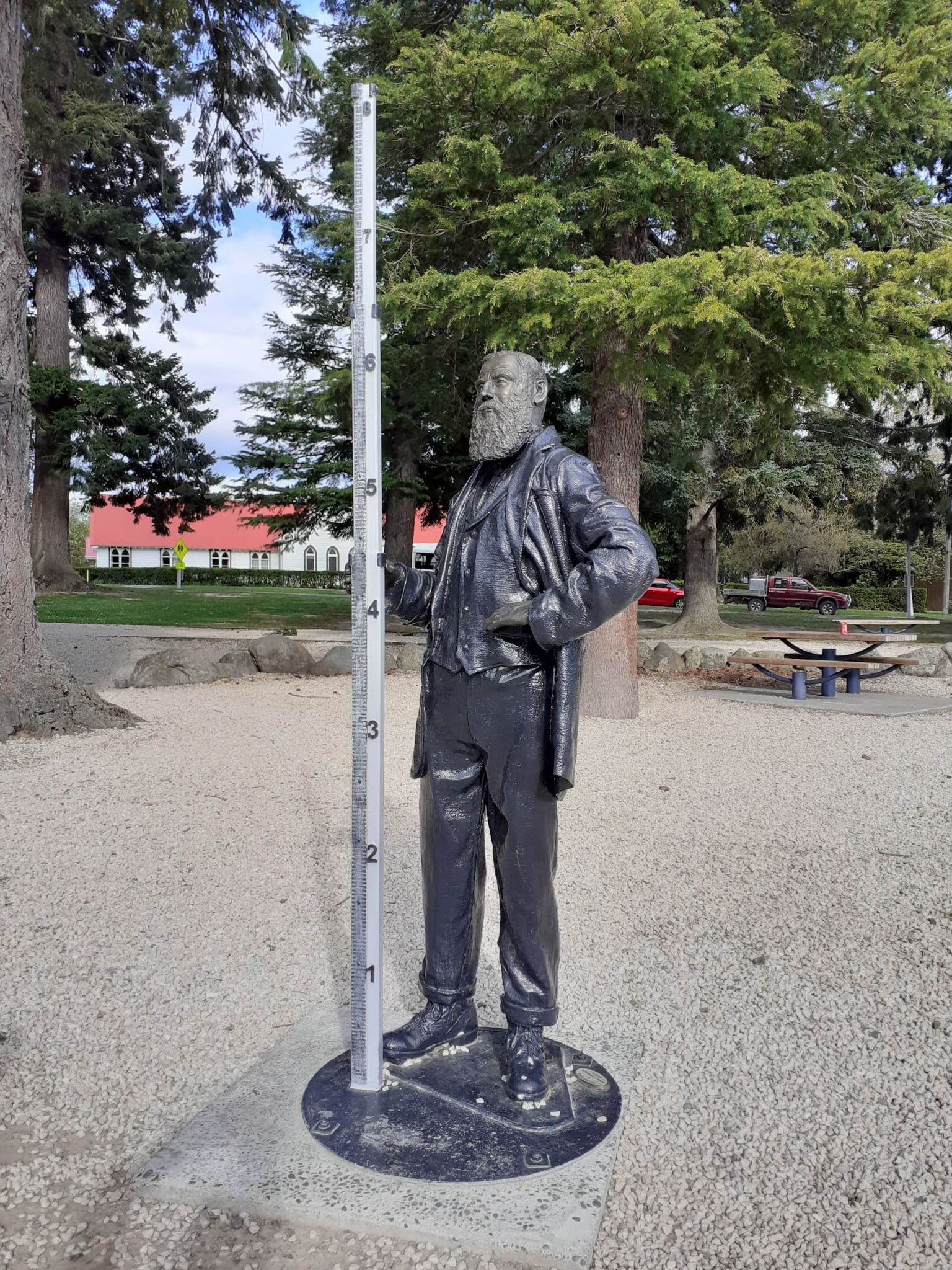
Statue of Thomas Hanmer, located in central Hanmer Springs

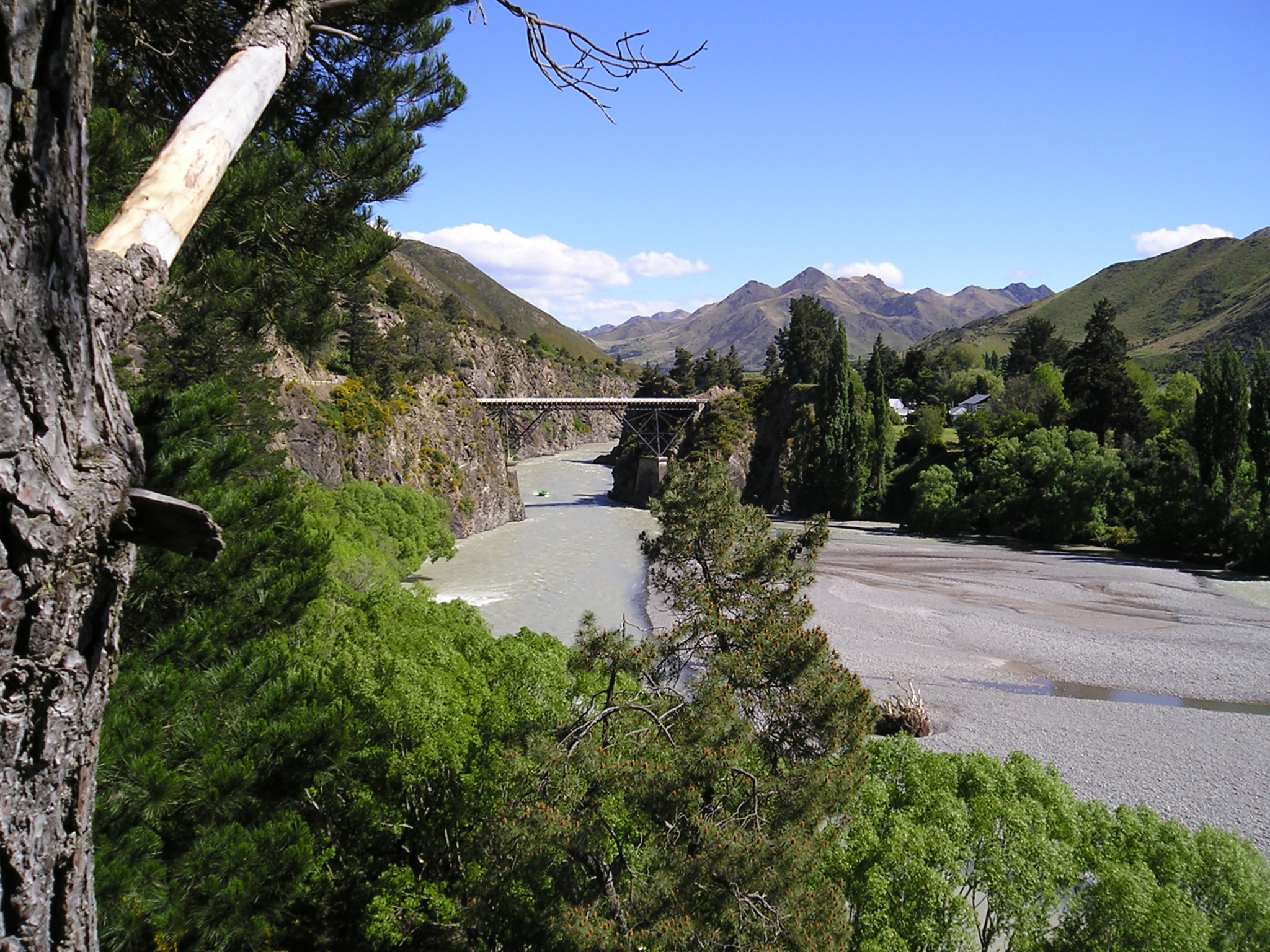
The Waiau Ferry Bridge over the Waiau Uwha River, just outside Hanmer Springs

Hanmer Springs had a population of 1,077 in the 2023 New Zealand census, an increase of 111 people (11.5%) since the 2018 census, and an increase of 237 people (28.2%) since the 2013 census. There were 543 males, 531 females, and 3 people of other genders in 555 dwellings. 3.1% of people identified as LGBTIQ+. The median age was 45.8 years (compared with 38.1 years nationally). There were 138 people (12.8%) aged under 15 years, 168 (15.6%) aged 15 to 29, 540 (50.1%) aged 30 to 64, and 234 (21.7%) aged 65 or older.

People could identify as more than one ethnicity. The results were 84.1% European (Pākehā); 8.1% Māori; 1.9% Pasifika; 10.0% Asian; 2.8% Middle Eastern, Latin American and African New Zealanders (MELAA); and 3.1% other, which includes people giving their ethnicity as "New Zealander". English was spoken by 96.9%, Māori by 1.7%, Samoan by 0.3%, and other languages by 14.2%. No language could be spoken by 1.4% (e.g. too young to talk). The percentage of people born overseas was 28.7, compared with 28.8% nationally.

Religious affiliations were 26.7% Christian, 3.1% Hindu, 0.8% Islam, 0.6% Buddhist, 1.4% New Age, and 2.2% other religions. People who answered that they had no religion were 58.2%, and 7.2% of people did not answer the census question.

Of those at least 15 years old, 195 (20.8%) people had a bachelor's or higher degree, 516 (55.0%) had a post-high school certificate or diploma, and 231 (24.6%) people exclusively held high school qualifications. The median income was $37,700, compared with $41,500 nationally. 69 people (7.3%) earned over $100,000 compared to 12.1% nationally. The employment status of those at least 15 was 501 (53.4%) full-time, 156 (16.6%) part-time, and 9 (1.0%) unemployed.

In 2018, there were 402 occupied private dwellings and a further 603 unoccupied private dwellings.

=== Hanmer Range ===
The statistical area of Hanmer Range surrounds but does not include Hanmer Springs. It covers 3,609.13 km^{2} (1,393.49 sq mi). It had an estimated population of 330 as of June 2025, with a population density of 0.09 people per km^{2}.

Historical population for Hanmer Range
Year	Pop.	±% p.a.
2006	216	—
2013	249	+2.05%
2018	255	+0.48%
2023	306	+3.71%

Hanmer Range had a population of 306 in the 2023 New Zealand census, an increase of 51 people (20.0%) since the 2018 census, and an increase of 57 people (22.9%) since the 2013 census. There were 162 males and 141 females in 165 dwellings. 2.0% of people identified as LGBTIQ+. The median age was 45.6 years (compared with 38.1 years nationally). There were 51 people (16.7%) aged under 15 years, 54 (17.6%) aged 15 to 29, 147 (48.0%) aged 30 to 64, and 51 (16.7%) aged 65 or older.

People could identify as more than one ethnicity. The results were 89.2% European (Pākehā); 13.7% Māori; 1.0% Pasifika; 3.9% Asian; 1.0% Middle Eastern, Latin American and African New Zealanders (MELAA); and 3.9% other, which includes people giving their ethnicity as "New Zealander". English was spoken by 98.0%, Māori by 2.9%, Samoan by 1.0%, and other languages by 7.8%. No language could be spoken by 2.0% (e.g. too young to talk). New Zealand Sign Language was known by 1.0%. The percentage of people born overseas was 18.6, compared with 28.8% nationally.

Religious affiliations were 24.5% Christian, 1.0% Hindu, and 2.0% other religions. People who answered that they had no religion were 66.7%, and 4.9% of people did not answer the census question.

Of those at least 15 years old, 57 (22.4%) people had a bachelor's or higher degree, 159 (62.4%) had a post-high school certificate or diploma, and 42 (16.5%) people exclusively held high school qualifications. The median income was $41,300, compared with $41,500 nationally. 27 people (10.6%) earned over $100,000 compared to 12.1% nationally. The employment status of those at least 15 was 153 (60.0%) full-time and 45 (17.6%) part-time.

== Governance ==
Hanmer Springs is part of the Kaikōura electorate. The Hurunui District Council is the local government body responsible for providing services to Hanmer Springs.

== Climate ==
Hanmer Springs has warm summers relative to rest of New Zealand, with an average of 50 days exceeding 25.0 °C (77 °F) every year, with some years having days that exceed 35 °C (95 °F). Winters are cold and frosty, with an average of 116 nights dropping below freezing every year, with subfreezing temperatures occurring in all seasons. Snow falls in Hanmer Springs and often closes the road into Hanmer Springs.

Hanmer Springs has one of the highest diurnal air temperature ranges in New Zealand, with an average daily range of 14.5 °C (26.1 °F), peaking in February with a range of 16.2 °C (29.2 °F).

Climate data for Hanmer Springs (Hanmer Forest), elevation 363 m (1,191 ft), (1991–2020 normals, extremes 1906–present)
Month	Jan	Feb	Mar	Apr	May	Jun	Jul	Aug	Sep	Oct	Nov	Dec	Year
Record high °C (°F)	38.4 (101.1)	37.1 (98.8)	32.6 (90.7)	27.8 (82.0)	26.0 (78.8)	21.7 (71.1)	20.5 (68.9)	25.1 (77.2)	27.8 (82.0)	28.8 (83.8)	32.5 (90.5)	34.6 (94.3)	38.4 (101.1)
Mean maximum °C (°F)	32.2 (90.0)	32.4 (90.3)	29.7 (85.5)	25.4 (77.7)	22.2 (72.0)	18.8 (65.8)	17.6 (63.7)	19.5 (67.1)	23.2 (73.8)	25.2 (77.4)	27.3 (81.1)	29.7 (85.5)	33.8 (92.8)
Mean daily maximum °C (°F)	23.8 (74.8)	23.9 (75.0)	21.5 (70.7)	18.1 (64.6)	14.9 (58.8)	11.2 (52.2)	10.7 (51.3)	12.9 (55.2)	15.6 (60.1)	17.5 (63.5)	19.2 (66.6)	21.7 (71.1)	17.6 (63.7)
Daily mean °C (°F)	16.0 (60.8)	15.8 (60.4)	13.6 (56.5)	10.6 (51.1)	7.9 (46.2)	4.8 (40.6)	4.2 (39.6)	6.0 (42.8)	8.4 (47.1)	10.2 (50.4)	11.9 (53.4)	14.4 (57.9)	10.3 (50.6)
Mean daily minimum °C (°F)	8.3 (46.9)	7.7 (45.9)	5.6 (42.1)	3.1 (37.6)	1.0 (33.8)	−1.6 (29.1)	−2.2 (28.0)	−0.9 (30.4)	1.3 (34.3)	3.0 (37.4)	4.6 (40.3)	7.1 (44.8)	3.1 (37.6)
Mean minimum °C (°F)	1.0 (33.8)	0.8 (33.4)	−1.2 (29.8)	−3.2 (26.2)	−5.3 (22.5)	−7.7 (18.1)	−7.9 (17.8)	−7.1 (19.2)	−5.1 (22.8)	−3.8 (25.2)	−2.1 (28.2)	0.1 (32.2)	−9.0 (15.8)
Record low °C (°F)	−2.2 (28.0)	−3.3 (26.1)	−3.3 (26.1)	−5.2 (22.6)	−9.7 (14.5)	−11.5 (11.3)	−13.2 (8.2)	−12.3 (9.9)	−8.2 (17.2)	−5.5 (22.1)	−4.3 (24.3)	−2.2 (28.0)	−13.2 (8.2)
Average rainfall mm (inches)	70.0 (2.76)	58.8 (2.31)	75.4 (2.97)	78.7 (3.10)	82.2 (3.24)	99.1 (3.90)	102.1 (4.02)	90.6 (3.57)	83.7 (3.30)	96.1 (3.78)	87.9 (3.46)	71.4 (2.81)	996.0 (39.21)
Source: NIWA

== Hot pools ==
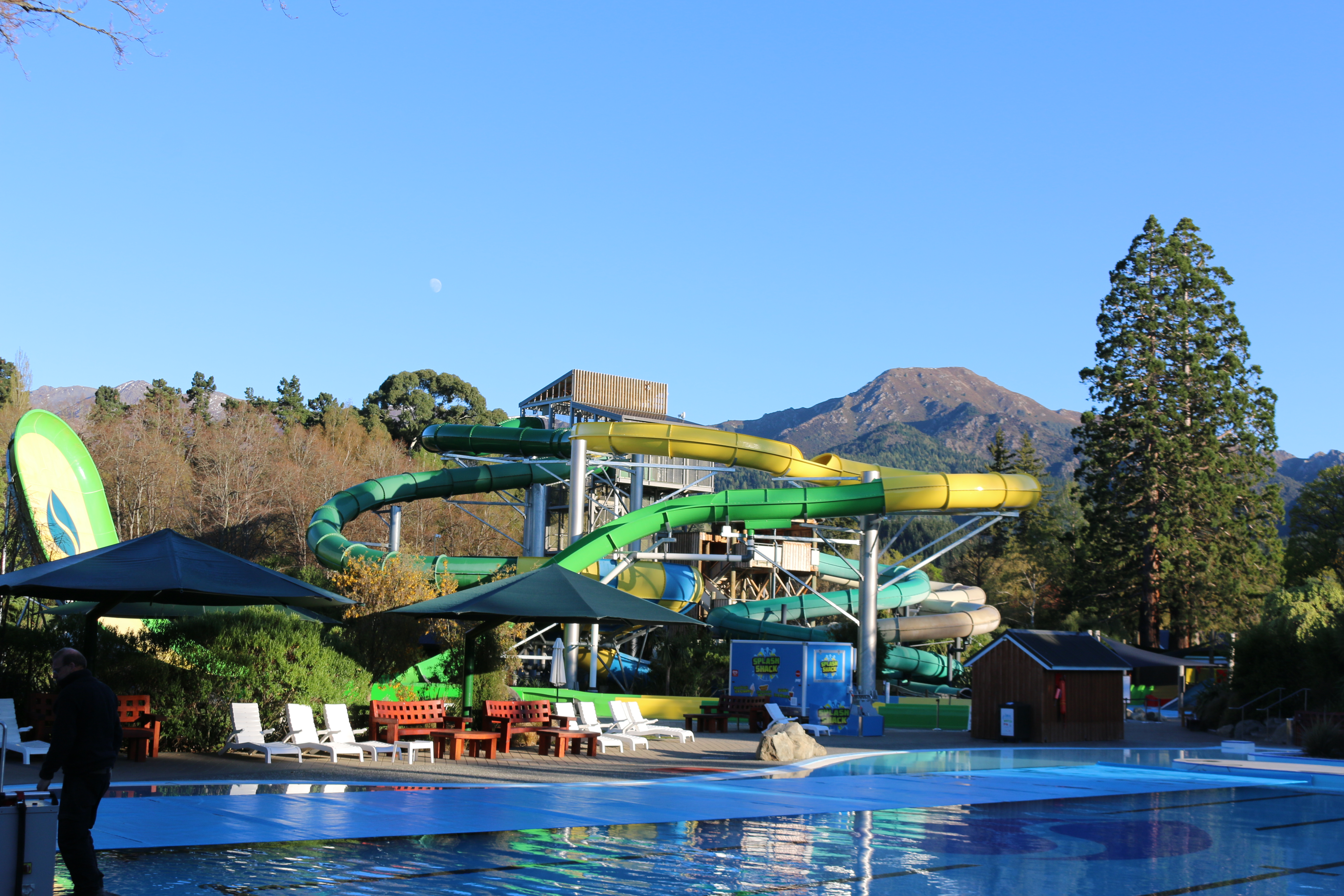
An early morning view of the Hanmer Springs hot pools and hydroslides in 2020, with Dumblane (1303 m) in the background.

In 1960 the local community purchased the hot pools and gifted them to the local council. The pools were segregated into male/female until 1978, and swimming costumes were not allowed. The three hexagonal pools which are still in use currently and a fresh water pool were built in 1978. Changing rooms and a new entrance way were constructed in 1985. The rock pools were built in 1992 and further sulphur pools constructed in 1999.

In 2009, a 4,600 m^{2} (50,000 sq ft) extension to the hot pools complex was proposed including "a second [16m high] water-slide, ice-skating rink and relocating and reconfiguring the freshwater pool." During the consent process oppositions were made to it by, among others, the Queen Mary Reserve Trust concerning the expansions effect on noise levels and visual impact. Concerns were also raised by former hospital superintendent, Dr Robert Crawford, about the change the development might have on the village's brand of "slow tourism and relaxation, not wet'n'wild."

After a hearing from independent Commissioner Robert Batty, on Monday, 18 January 2010 the proposal was approved. "The freshwater pool, new buildings, water slide and super bowl and the aqua play and ice skating area are all to be on land from the subdivision of Queen Mary Hospital land." Development had continued since then and Hanmer Springs currently has 22 pools and four water slides with the most recent: The Conical Thrill being opened in November 2019. The Hot Pools were further extended in November 2020 with a new area for younger children to play on including a new waterslide. The Hanmer Springs Hot Pools also was the winner in the Luxury Hot Springs category at the 2020 World Luxury Spa Awards. At peak times, the hot pools can host up to 5000 people each day.

In 2023, two 25 year old hydroslides were replaced with new slides that include internal LED lighting and projection.

== Other tourism ==
Hanmer Springs is a tourist destination, and the town's population swells during holidays. Hanmer Springs has around 520,000 visitors each year. Bungy jumping, jet boating, white water rafting, mountain biking and hiking are common tourist activities, and there is an airline service available for the viewing of the town's alpine surroundings. A Visitor Information Centre next to the hot springs provides information about the area and booking facilities for transport. Trampers can obtain weather information, maps and guidance from the Department of Conservation.

Accommodation options include hotels and various motels. Budget accommodation includes a youth hostel. Holiday homes are commonly rented out in Hanmer Springs.

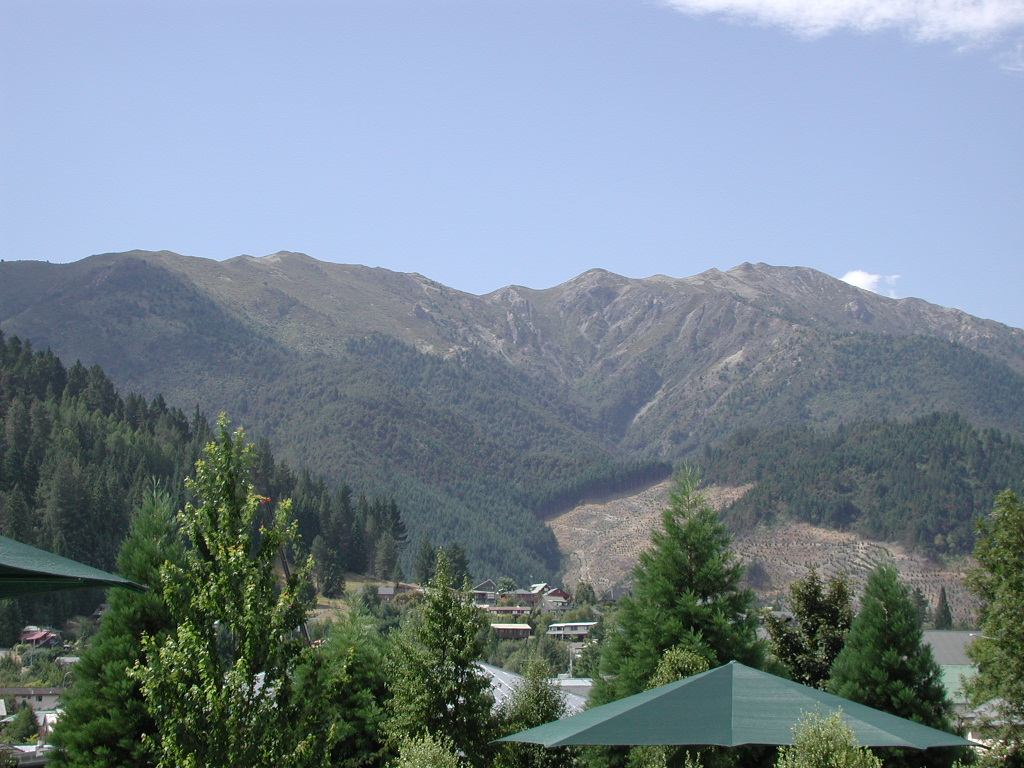
Mount Isobel behind Hanmer Springs

The Hanmer Forest provides many walking trails. The Conical Hill walk ascends to the 550 metre summit and provides a panoramic view of Hanmer Springs. Western hemlock, Lawson's Cypress, Japanese cypresses, giant fir, Atlas cedar, and laburnum can be seen on this walk all of which were planted around 1910. The Shelter at the summit provides protection from the weather. A plaque at the shelter commemorates the role of Duncan Rutherford (1853–1917) has had in Hanmer Springs. Longer walking trips up Mount Isobel are possible via a variety of tracks.

The Hanmer Springs Rugby Football Club plays in the North Canterbury Rugby Union. They often hold a preseason game between the Canterbury and Tasman Makos sides. A variety of other endurance sporting events are annually held in Hanmer Springs including the Mount Isobel Challenge, The Alpine Marathon, the 4 hour and 8 hour mountain bike races, Hanmer Half Marathon and the Christchurch to Hanmer Springs road cycling race run by the Pegasus Cycling Club.

Mini golf is popular in Hanmer Springs. There is a variety of restaurants in Hanmer Springs. An animal park is located in Hanmer Springs. It provides experiences aimed at younger children.

Hanmer Springs is a gateway to the St James Conservation Area for hiking, biking, water sports, skiing, hunting and horse riding.

In July 2020, the New Zealand Government announced that it had granted $2 million towards the cost of building a twisting 850-metre long flying fox in Hanmer Springs. Construction was expected to be finished by September 2021, and the project was expected to create 25 new jobs and provide $4 million revenue over the first five years. In May 2021, the resource consent application was suspended as planning showed that the ride would have to be modified due to the undulating hill side. Local residents objected to it in September 2021 saying that it "will ruin everything that is special about Conical Hill". After lengthy delays caused by appeals, the Hurunui District Council received approval from the Environment Court in late 2024. By June 2025, the District Council was re-evaluating the merits of project, and in May 2026 announced that it would not fund the project.

== Hanmer Springs Forest ==
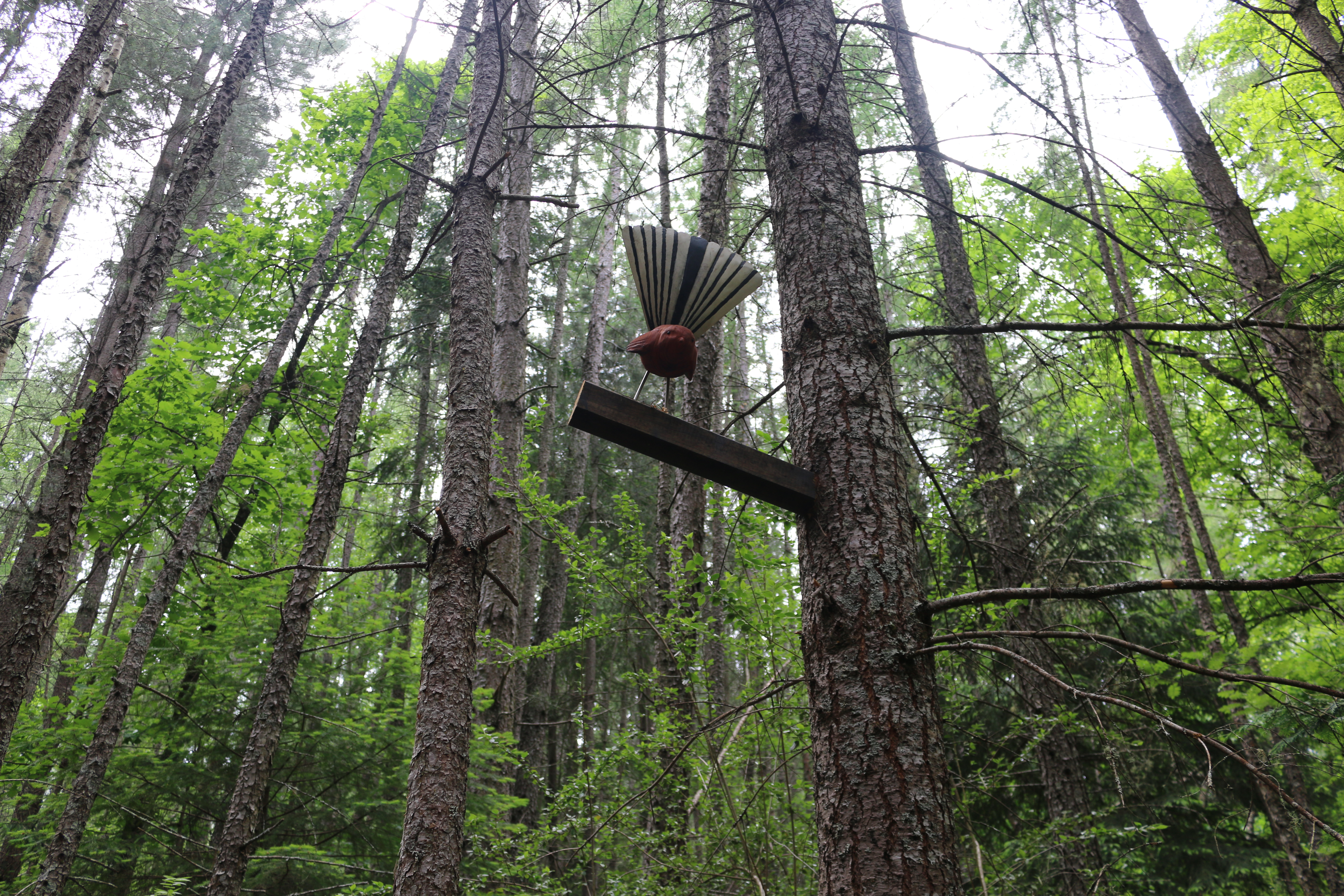
An art trail, with sculptures by Andrew Lyons, exists within the Hanmer Springs Forest

In order to provide timber for the Christchurch market, reserve land was set aside between 1900 and 1901. The planting of exotic trees began in 1902, and in 1903 prison labour was used. The prisoners who took part in the planting resided at a nearby prison camp which operated until 1913. A variety of trees were planted including black pines, Norway spruce and deciduous larch, with alders in wet areas, and oaks and silver birches planted as amenity species. The oldest area of the forest (203 hectares) is protected under a Crown covenant. Many woody species have invaded this forest from the township's gardens. In 1964 pupils of Hanmer Primary School planted a 0.6-hectare (1.5-acre) block of pinus nigra in order to commemorate Arbor day. A number of walking trails now go through this mature forest.

In 2000, the Government sold the North Canterbury Crown Forests to Ngai Tahu as part of a Treaty of Waitangi settlement. Thus the Hanmer Springs Forests passed into private ownership. In 2008 a memorandum of understanding was signed by Matariki Forests, Hanmer Heritage Trust and the Hurunui District Council that protected the ongoing right for public access to the Hanmer Springs Forest. The Hurunui District Council would now be responsible for the maintenance of the tracks within the forest.

In 2018 an art trail of animal sculptures made from a redwood tree by Christchurch sculptor Andrew Lyons was opened.

The 41 metre high Dog Stream waterfall is located in the Hanmer Forest Park.

A parkrun event was established in Hanmer Forest in September 2024. Each Saturday at 8 a.m. parkrun takes place, starting and finishing in Brooke Dawson Reserve. The course is 5 km long, and is unusual in that it is a 5 km lap, as opposed to many parkuns which feature 2 or more laps in a park, or an out-and-back course. Despite the name, running is not mandatory. Many people walk or jog the course, which is equally welcome and recognised.

== Economy ==
The town is built around hot springs which originate in the fractured rock bed along the Hanmer fault.

The Hanmer Springs Queen Mary Hospital, formerly the South Island's leading rehabilitation centre for sufferers of drug addiction, was closed in 2003.

== Transportation ==
Two private shuttle bus companies travel from Hanmer Springs to Christchurch and back. Hanmer Connection operates a daily service, while East West Coaches offers seasonal services on selected days. The town is the gateway to the Molesworth station, Lake Tennyson and Rainbow station. During summer months, gravel roads through the Rainbow Valley to St Arnaud and the Nelson Lakes National Park, and through the Molesworth Station to Blenheim, Picton, and the Marlborough region are frequented by travellers, four-wheel drivers, and guided tour groups.

== Ski fields ==
There are two skifields in the Hanmer Springs area: the Hanmer Springs Ski Area and Mount Lyford. The Hanmer Springs Ski Area is run mostly by volunteers.

== Mountain biking ==
Hanmer Springs is well known for mountain biking. The St James Cycle Trail is part of Nga Haerenga The New Zealand Cycle Trail. The trail is located 13 kilometres (8.1 mi) from Hanmer Springs over Jacks Pass. This mountain bike ride is a 57 kilometres (35 mi) loop that a fit rider can do in a day. It is also possible to turn the ride into a longer adventure with the option of making it a two-day trip, stopping overnight in campsites or one of three huts. Work is starting in 2020 to extend the St James trail to Hanmer Springs.

There is an extensive network of mountain bike trails ranging from easy to expert runs in the forests surrounding Hanmer Springs. Alligator Alley, Upper Dog Stream, Detox and the Tank Track are particularly popular. The network of trails has been extended in 2020 with the addition of the Southern Cross and Tombstone trails. The four kilometre long Tombstone trail includes 185 m of climbing to the highest point and a twisty 240 m descent. The mountainbike trails have been described as "world class".

The Jacks Pass – Clarence River – Jollies Pass Loop is a 25 kilometres (16 mi) loop which is not technically challenging; however, it takes between two and four hours to complete. It can be ridden in either direction: West over Jacks Pass (869 m) or East over Jollies Pass (850 m). As the entire ride is at high elevation (700 m above sea level) it is subject to extreme and sudden changes in the weather which have caught riders out who were not prepared.

Hanmer Springs is the starting point (or end point) for both the Molesworth Muster cycle trail and the Rainbow Trail. These are also part of Nga Haerenga The New Zealand Cycle Trail.

== Notable buildings ==
Notable buildings

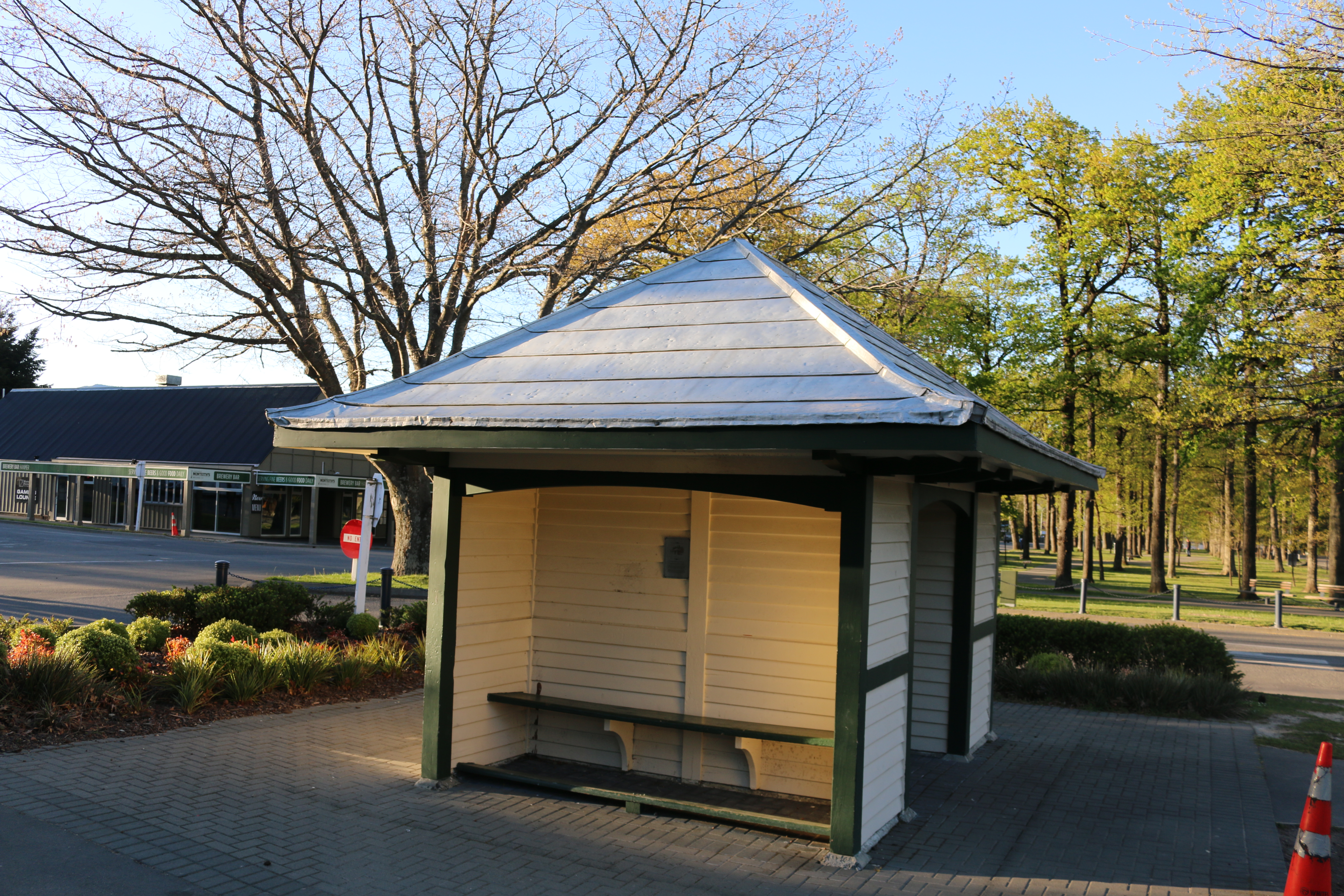
Banana House, Hanmer Springs

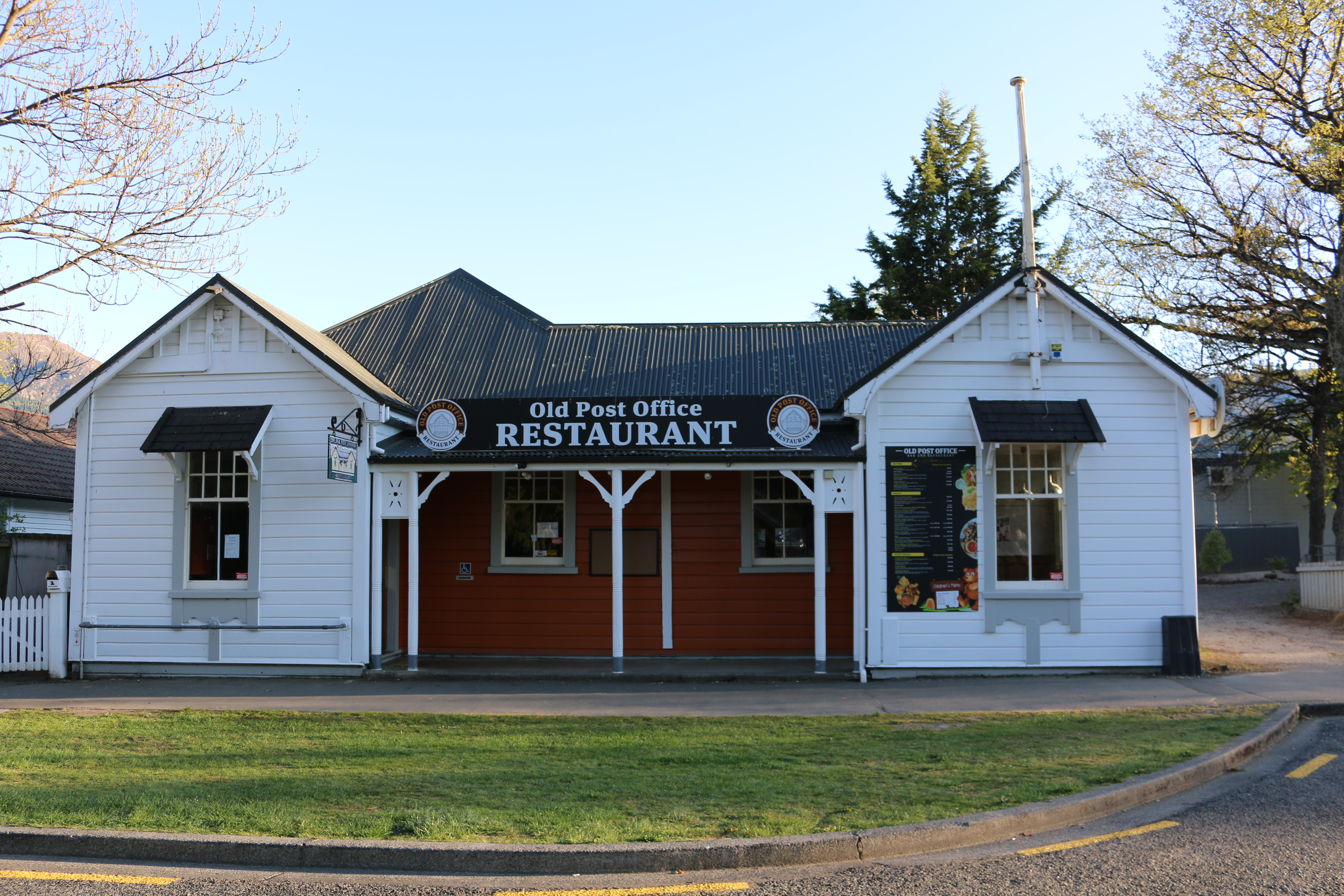
The Hanmer Springs Post Office (now occupied by a restaurant)

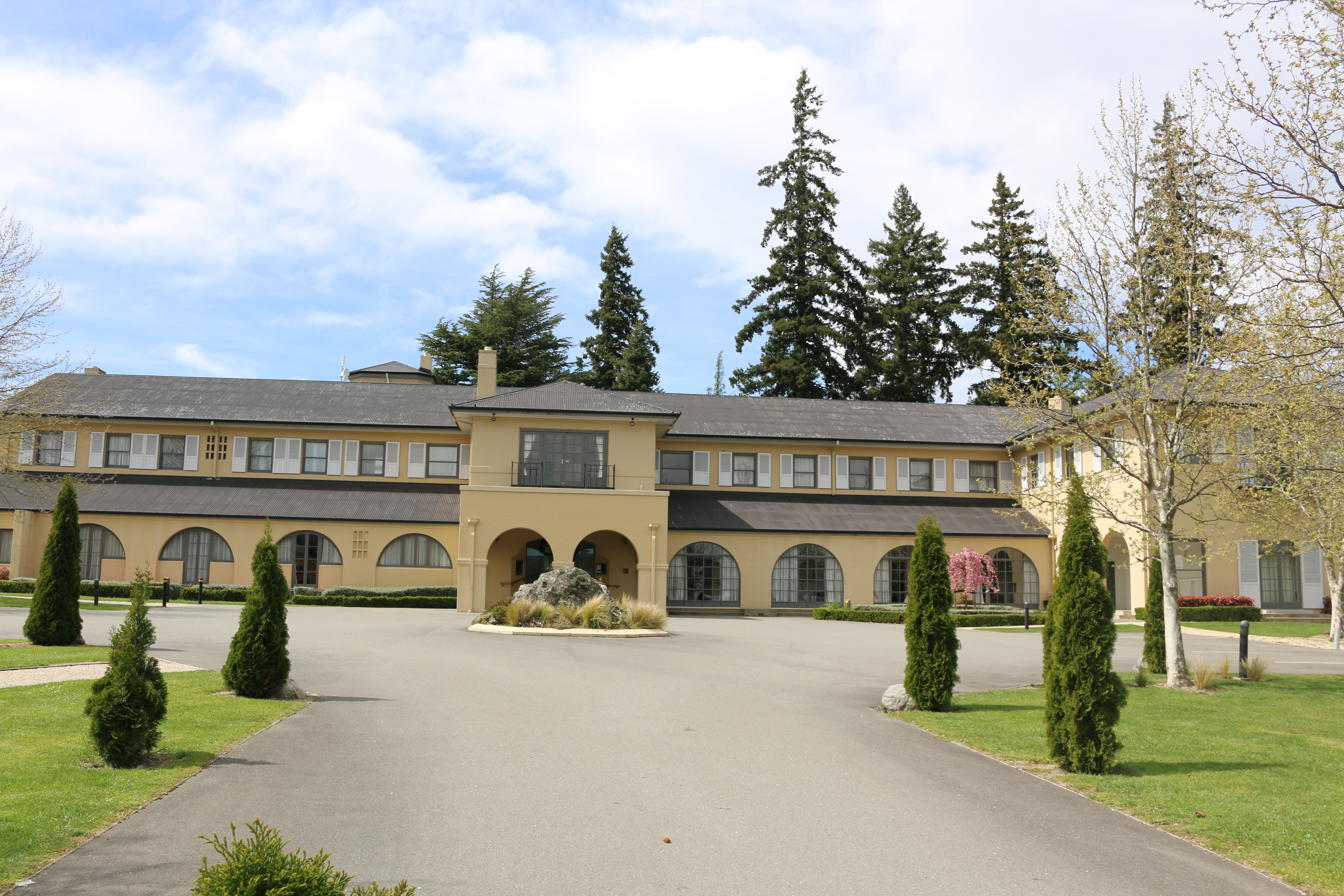
The former Heritage Hotel, Hanmer Springs

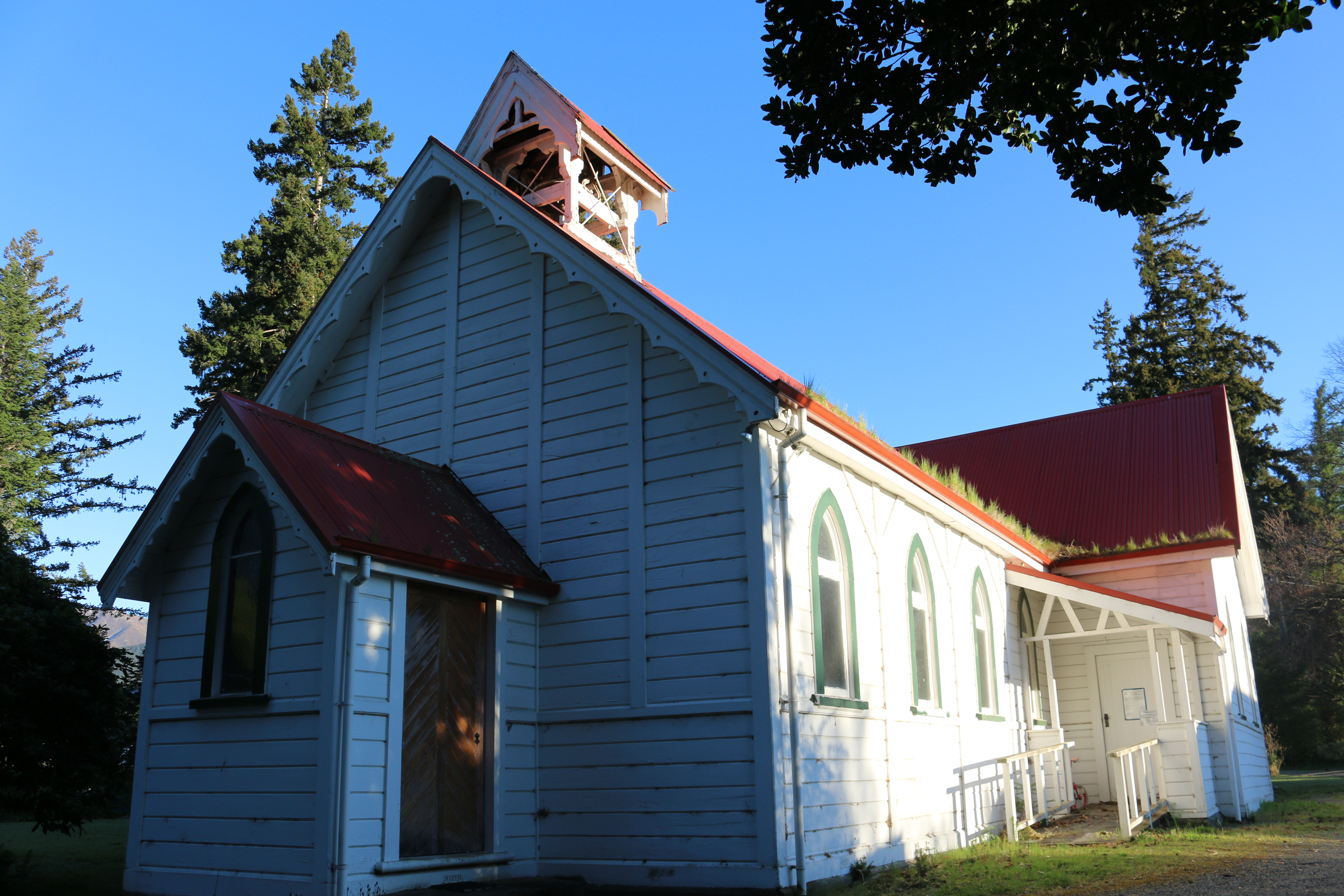
Hanmer Springs Presbyterian Church

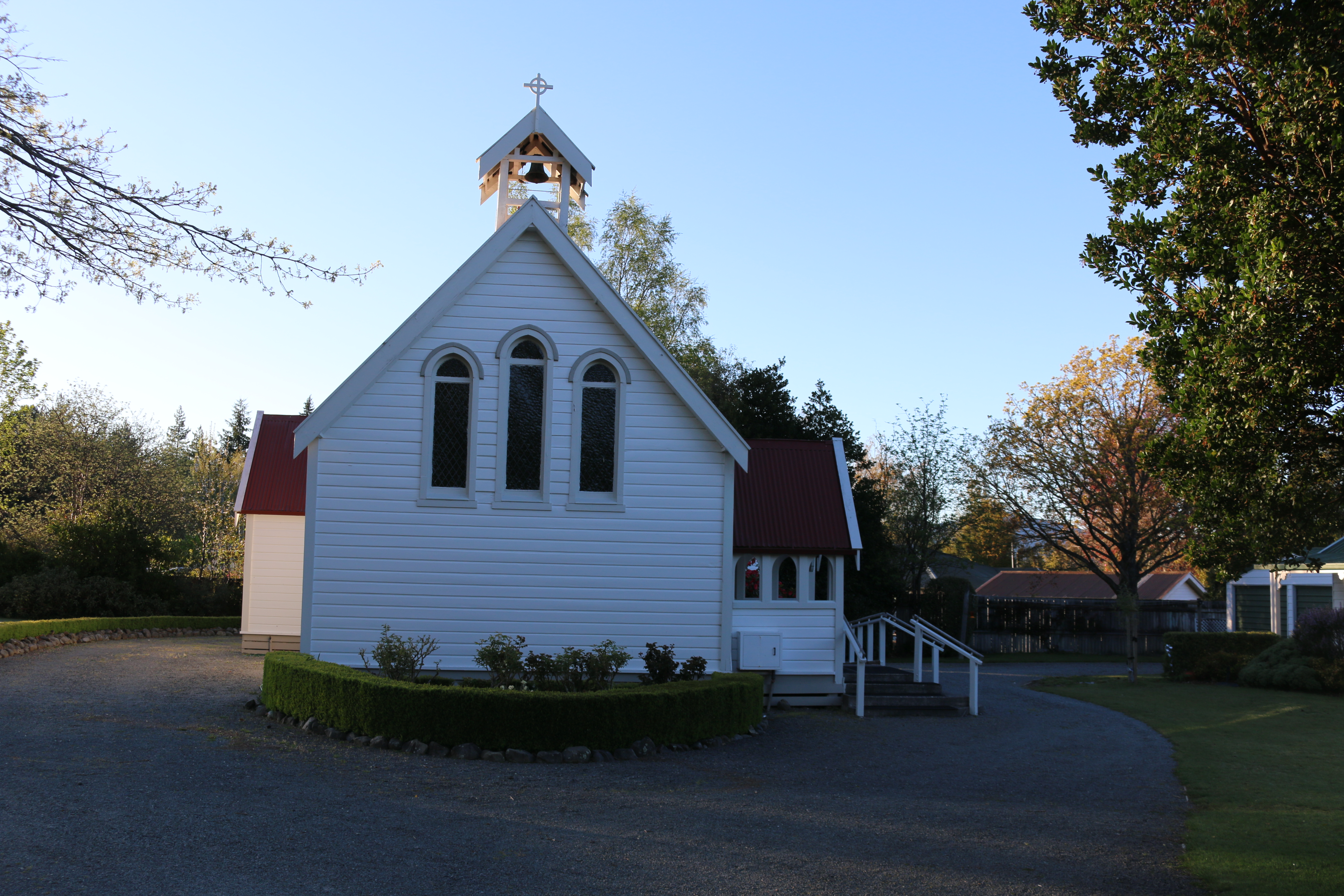
Church of the Epiphany, Hanmer Springs, Built 1901

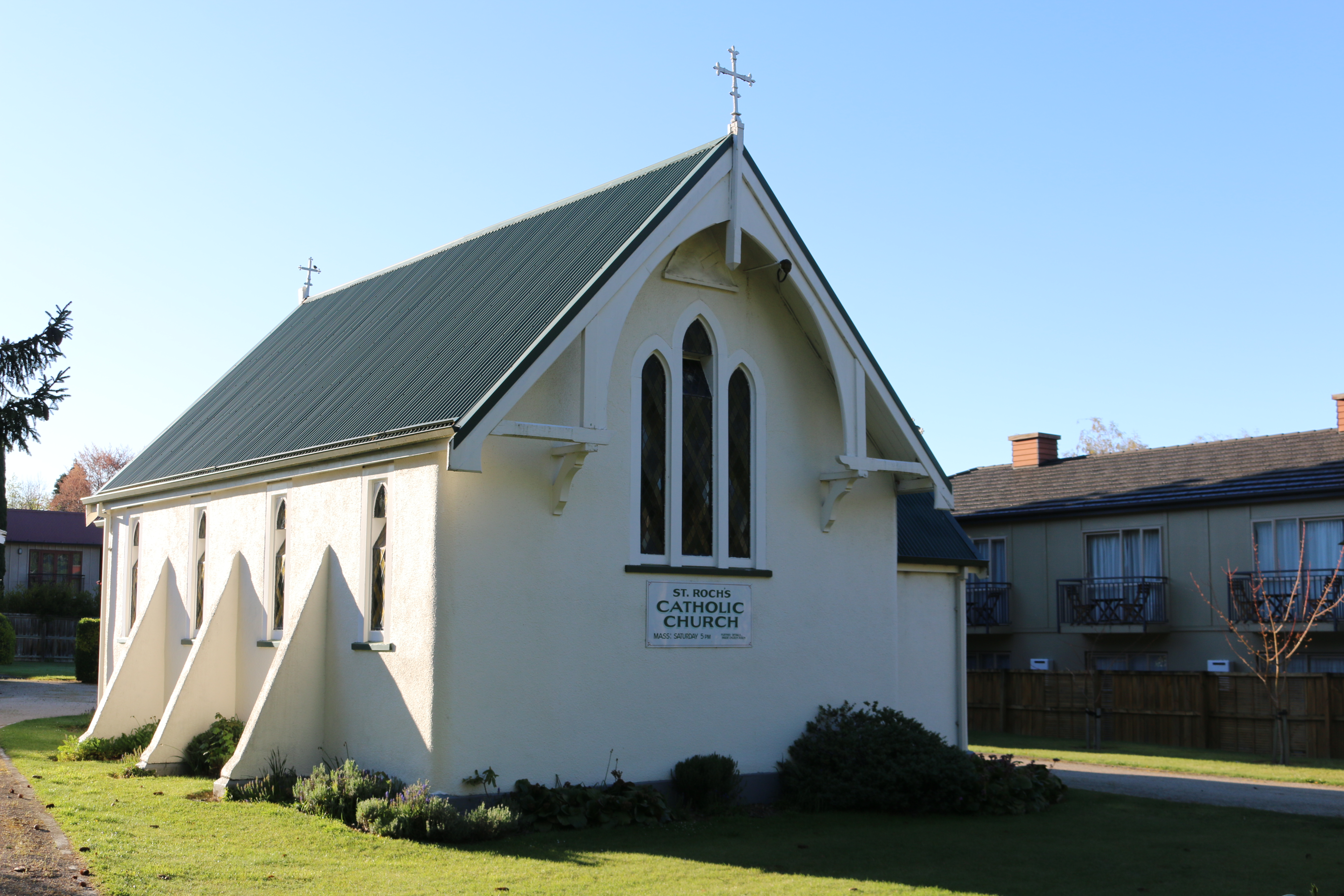
St Rochs Catholic Church, Hanmer Springs

Saint Andrews Presbyterian Church was built in 1892. It had to be rebuilt the following year due to a "hurricane" causing significant damage to it. The manse at Hanmer Springs was completed in January 1902. It closed on 29 November 2015. As of October 2022, a notice on the buildingstates that the Church does not meet earthquake building regulations and warns people not to enter the building. The Church of the Epiphany is the Anglican Church in Hanmer Springs . It was listed as a Historic Place Category 2 in 1983. it was built in 1901 by Mr T W Berry of Blenheim. Saint Rochs is the Catholic Church in Hanmer Springs. It was listed as a Historic Place Category 2 in 1984.

The original Hanmer Springs Post Office was built in 1901 and is a Historic Place Category 2, listed in 1983. It is now used as a restaurant. The Banana House was donated by FJ Savill who was the owner of St Helen's Station in the early 1920s. It was built in part by Bert Orange also known by some locals as Bertie Bananas. Between this and the shelter being next to a Monkey Puzzle Tree, the shelter became known as the Banana House. The original structure had glass windows but these were removed due to ongoing vandalism. The roof is made of aluminium with moulded corners and joints.

The Powerhouse building was built to house a small hydro electric generator in 1926. The water was provided by the nearby Rogerson river. This water was transported via wooden staved penstocks along what is now Jacks Pass Road. It provided electricity for the Queen Mary Hospital as well as a few street lights. In 1934 mains electricity lines connected Hanmer Springs to the electricity grid via Waipara. The Powerhouse is now a cafe.

The Hanmer Springs Lodge, built in a Spanish Mission style was completed in 1932. It operated as the Heritage Hotel Hanmer until May 2020; when a combination of intense competition for holiday accommodation and COVID-19 meant that it closed temporarily following the withdrawal of the Heritage Hotels Group from management. The hotel was then purchased by the CPG hotel chain who reopened it in December 2020 with plans to further develop it as a five star resort in 2021.

The War Memorial Hall was completed in 1961. It has a more recent extension that includes an art gallery, library and district council offices. Just outside it is a Ginkgo tree that was planted in 1964 by the governor-general, Brigadier Sir Bernard Fergusson.

== Education ==
Hanmer Springs School is a co-educational state primary school for Year 1 to 8 students, with a roll of 97 as of July 2026. The school was first established in 1896. The original building was built in 1901 of "wood and iron".

== Fauna ==
There are numerous native species living in and around Hanmer Springs. These include keas, black-fronted tern (tarapirohe), banded dotterel (tūturiwhatu), rough gecko (moko kākāriki), South Island pied oystercatcher (tōrea), South Island robin (kakaruwai/ tōtōara), New Zealand falcon (kārearea), South Island tomtit (ngirungiru/ kōmiromiro), grey warbler (hōrirerire/riroriro), fantail (pīwakawaka), bellbird (tītapu/kōpara), New Zealand pigeon (kererū) amongst others.

There are also numerous introduced predators in and around Hanmer Springs including stoats, ferrets, rats, mice, cats and possums for which Te Tihi o Rauhea Hanmer Springs Conservation Trust in partnership with the Department of Conservation are aiming to eliminate in order to support threatened native species.
