= Oppau =

Oppau may refer to:

- Ludwigshafen-Oppau, a suburb of Ludwigshafen, Germany
  - Oppau explosion, which occurred there in 1921
- Opawa, Lower Silesian Voivodeship (German: Oppau), Poland
- Zábřeh, Dolní Benešov, Czech Republic; See List of historical German and Czech names for places in the Czech Republic

== See also ==
- Opava (disambiguation)
- Opawa (disambiguation)
