= Opawa (disambiguation) =

Opawa may refer to:

Poland

- Opawa, Lower Silesian Voivodeship, a village in south-western Poland

New Zealand

- Ōpaoa River (formerly called the Opawa River), a river through Blenheim
  - Opawa River Bridge, a bridge in Blenheim
- Little Opawa River, a river in South Canterbury
- Opawa, a suburb of Christchurch, New Zealand.

== See also ==
- Opava, a city in the northern Czech Republic on the river Opava
- Opava (disambiguation)
