= Branch River =

Branch River is the name of several rivers:

== Australia ==
- The Branch River

== New Zealand ==
- Branch River (Taylor River tributary)
- Branch River (Wairau River tributary)

== United States ==
- Branch River (New Hampshire), a tributary of Salmon Falls River
- The Branch, also known as "Branch River", New Hampshire, a tributary of Ashuelot River
- Branch River (Rhode Island)
- Branch River (Wisconsin)

== See also ==
- Branch (disambiguation)
