= List of bridges in New Zealand =

This is a list of notable bridges in New Zealand.

Bridge	Picture	Length (metres)	Length (feet)	Spans	Region	Built	Comment
Auckland Harbour Bridge		1,020	3,350	Waitematā Harbour in Auckland	Auckland Region	1959	Road (motorway) bridge
Balclutha Road Bridge		244	801	Clutha River at Balclutha	Otago region	1935	Road bridge
City to Sea Bridge				Jervois Quay (from Civic Square to Whairepo Lagoon)	Wellington Region	1994	Pedestrian bridge
Fairfield Bridge		139	456	Waikato River at Hamilton	Waikato Region	1937	Road bridge, pedestrian bridge
Grafton Bridge		97.6	320	Grafton Gully in Auckland	Auckland Region	1910	Road bridge, bus bridge (Central Connector)
Hamish Hay Bridge				Avon River	Canterbury region	1864	Pedestrian / cycle bridge in Victoria Square (road closed in 1989)
Kohukohu Bridge				Kohukohu	Northland Region	1840s	Oldest bridge extant in New Zealand. Built of Sydney sandstone.
Kopu Bridge		463	1,519	Waihou River near Thames	Waikato Region	1928 (first); 2011 (second)	Road bridge
Manukau Harbour Crossing (Mangere Bridge)				Manukau Harbour south of Onehunga, Auckland	Auckland Region	1875 (first, since demolished); 1915 (second, since limited to walking/cycling); 1983 (third, motorway); 2010 (duplication of motorway)	Road (motorway) bridge, with separate footbridge/cycleway
Maungatapu Bridge		316	1,037	Tauranga Harbour in Tauranga	Bay of Plenty Region	1959	Road bridge
Mohaka Viaduct		276.8	908	Mohaka River near Raupunga	Northern Hawke's Bay	1930–1937	Rail bridge
Newmarket Viaduct		700	2,300	Broadway (street) / and valley in Newmarket	Auckland Region	1966	Road (motorway) bridge
Onepoto Bridge		46	151	Local creek / estuary in Auckland	Auckland Region		Pedestrian / cycle bridge
Opawa River Bridge				Ōpaoa River at Blenheim	Marlborough Region	1869 (first, since collapsed); 1917 (second)	Road bridge
Opiki Toll Bridge				Manawatū River	Manawatū-Whanganui	1918	Derelict road bridge
Rakaia Bridge		1,756	5,761	Rakaia River at Rakaia	Canterbury, New Zealand	1939	Road bridge
Tauranga Harbour Bridge		466	1,529	Tauranga Harbour in Tauranga	Bay of Plenty Region	1988 (first); 2009 (duplication)	Road bridge
Te Matau ā Pohe (Lower Hatea Crossing)		265	869	Hatea River in Whangārei	Northland Region	2013	Raiseable road and pedestrian bridge
Upper Harbour Bridge		457 (first); 524 (second)	1,499 (first); 1,719 (second)	Waitematā Harbour in Auckland	Auckland Region	1970s (first); 2006 (duplication)	Road (motorway) bridge, with separate footbridge/cycleway
Victoria Park Viaduct				Victoria Park in Auckland	Auckland Region		Road (motorway) bridge
Wynyard Crossing				Viaduct Harbour in Auckland	Auckland Region	2011	Pedestrian / cycle bridge

== See also ==
- List of bridges
- List of New Zealand spans, a list of overhead powerline spans
