= Transport in New Zealand =

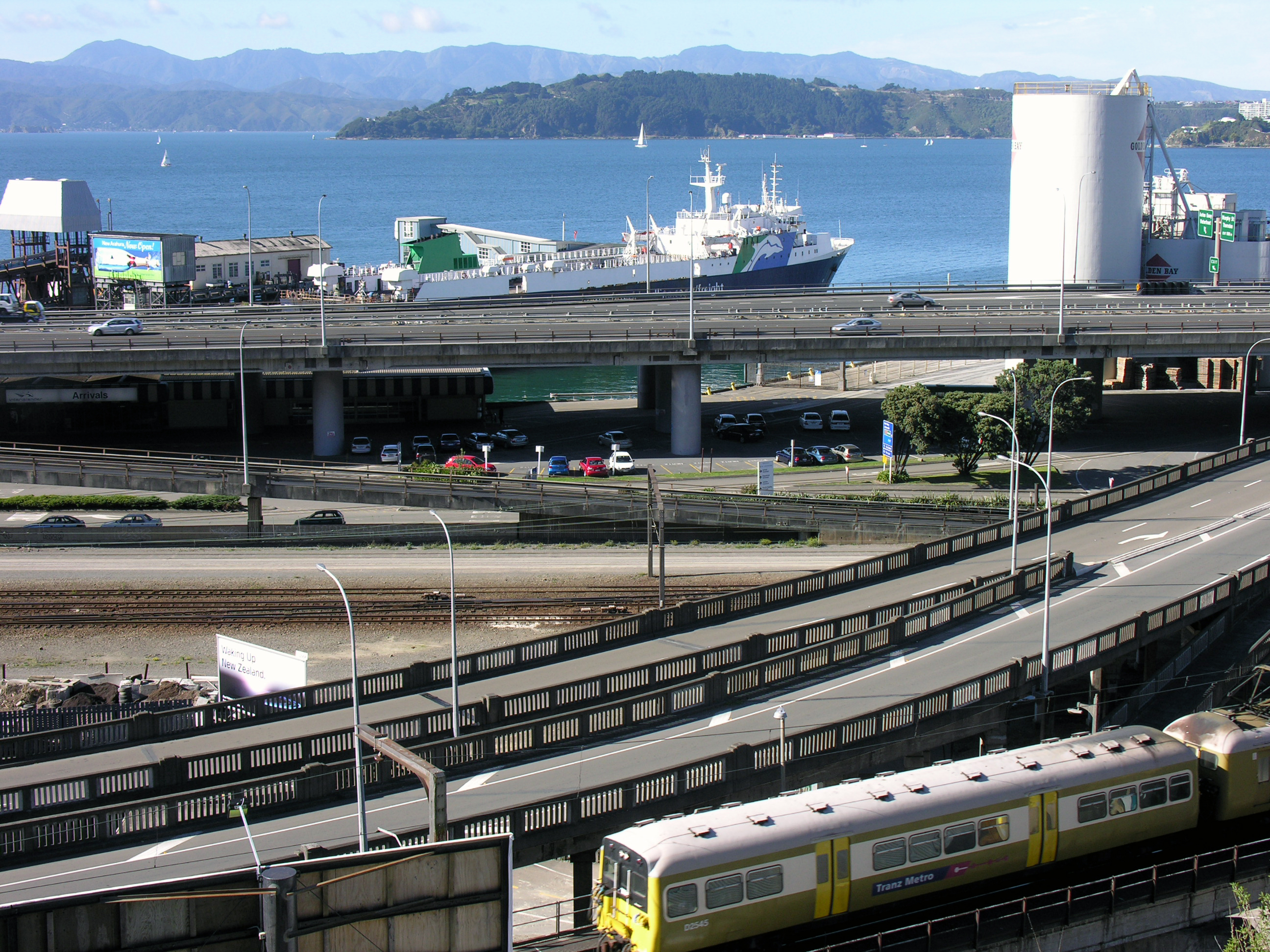
Highways, railway tracks, a train and an inter-island ferry in central Wellington in 2005

Transport in New Zealand consists of road, rail, water and air services, together with walking and cycling. Before Europeans arrived, Māori travelled on foot or by watercraft along rivers and coasts. Shipping and railways were important ways of moving goods and people during the early years of European settlement. Heavy investment in roads from the 1950s made road transport the dominant mode, and roads now carry most of the country's freight. New Zealand has historically depended heavily on cars and has one of the highest rates of vehicle ownership in the world. Rail and coastal shipping still carry bulk freight, and air services link the main centres and connect the country with other countries.

The road network grew out of tracks used by Māori and later by European settlers. The British Army built some of the first roads to move troops, and demand for better roads grew in the late 19th century as dairy farming expanded. The road system was greatly extended after the Second World War, and the first motorway opened near Wellington in 1950. State highways link the main urban centres and are run by NZ Transport Agency Waka Kotahi, while city and district councils manage most other roads. Traffic drives on the left. Roads are funded mainly by fuel taxes, road user charges and local council rates. Walking and cycling infrastructure receive much less transport funding than roads.

Railways developed alongside roads during the first half-century of European settlement. Today the network uses narrow-gauge track and is run by the state-owned company KiwiRail. At its peak in the 1950s, the network had about ninety branch lines, and most of these have since closed. For about fifty years from 1931, the government protected railways from road competition by law. Land transport was deregulated in 1983. Between 1982 and 1993 the railways were reorganised, many lines and stations were closed, and the business was sold to private owners. The government took back control of the track in 2003 and agreed in 2008 to buy the rail and ferry operations, which were renamed KiwiRail. Rail mainly carries bulk freight such as coal, logs, milk products and fertiliser. Long-distance passenger trains run on three routes, and commuter services operate in Auckland and Wellington.

Public transport use fell after heavy spending on roads began in the 1950s. Buses are the main form of public transport in the cities along with commuter rail in Wellington and Auckland, and a network of long-distance coach services link the main centres.

In the early years of European settlement, coastal shipping was one of the main ways of moving people and goods. In the 1970s, container shipping changed the port industry, and ports such as Auckland and Lyttelton were rebuilt to handle the larger ships. In the 1980s, harbour boards were replaced by commercial port companies. In 1994, the rule limiting coastal shipping to New Zealand companies was removed, so international shipping lines could carry cargo between New Zealand ports. Coastal shipping now carries a small share of the country's freight by weight. Vehicle ferries have crossed Cook Strait between Wellington and Picton since 1962. Smaller ferries serve harbours and islands such as Stewart Island.

Air New Zealand, the state-owned national airline, is the largest of the airlines that operate in New Zealand. Five airports have international flights. Auckland and Christchurch, the largest airports in the North and South Islands, have both long-haul and short-haul services. Wellington, Dunedin and Queenstown have short-haul services to Australia and Fiji. About thirty other airports have scheduled domestic flights.

== Road transport ==
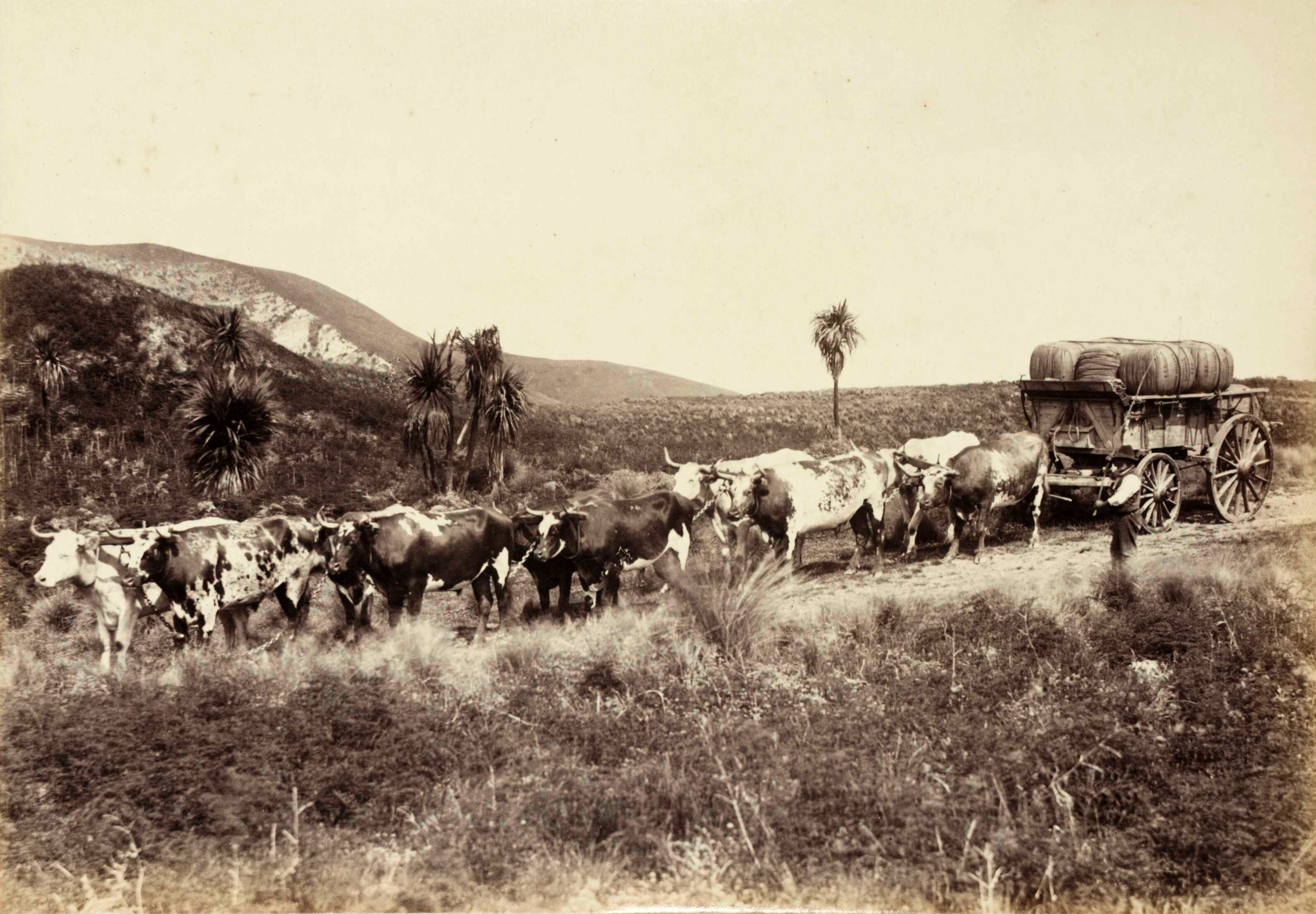
A bullock wagon in the Canterbury Region in the 1880s. Their tracks later often formed the first roads.

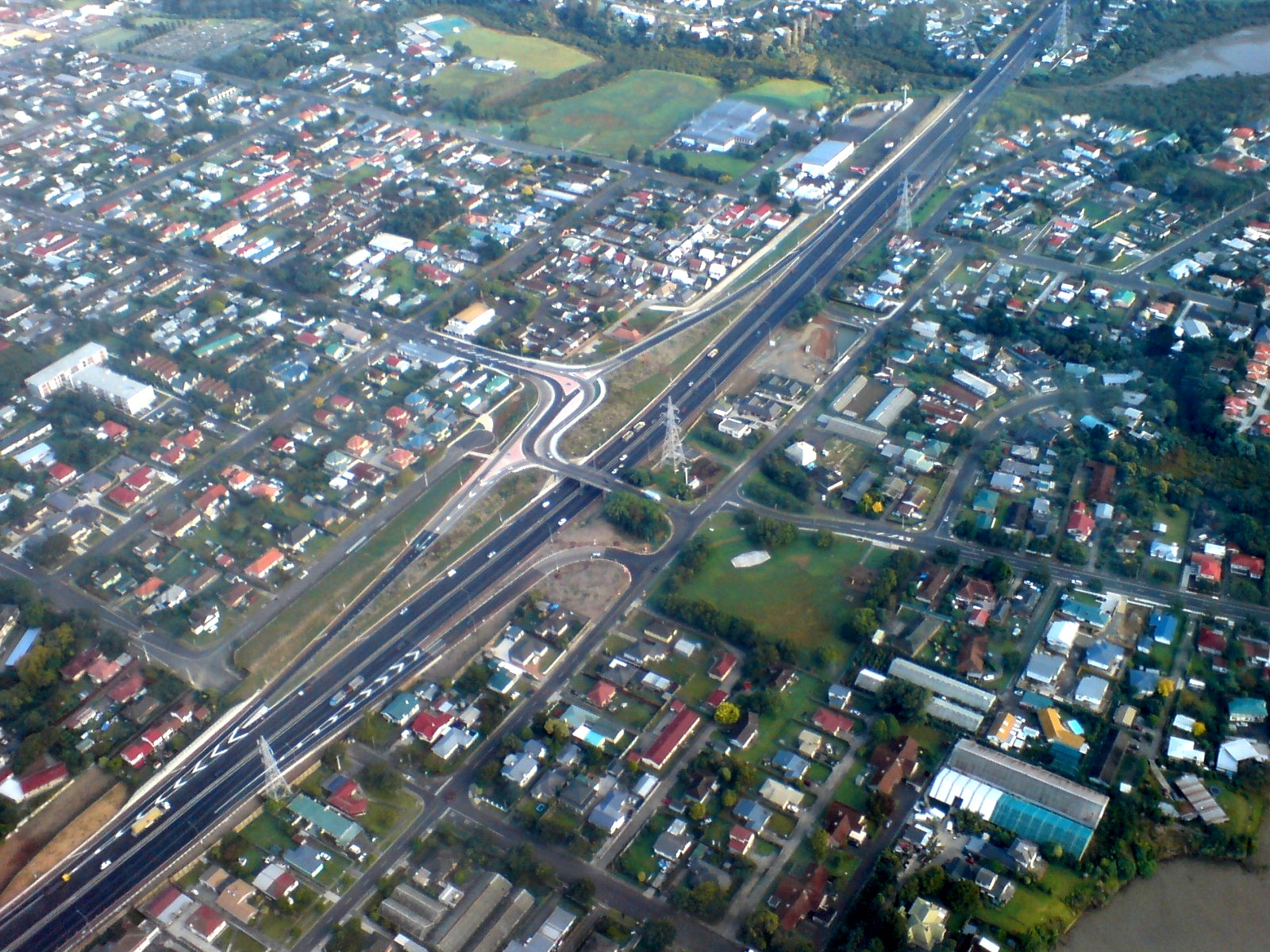
State Highway 1 in South Auckland

The state highway network is the principal road infrastructure connecting New Zealand urban centres. It is administered by the NZ Transport Agency Waka Kotahi. The majority of smaller or urban roads are managed by city or district councils, although some fall under the control of other authorities, such as the New Zealand Department of Conservation or port and airport authorities.

New Zealand has left-hand traffic on its roads.

=== History ===
Before Europeans arrived, Māori either walked or used watercraft on rivers or along the coasts. The road network of New Zealand has its origins in these tracks and paths used by Māori and later by Europeans in their early travels through New Zealand. Several major Māori tracks were known, such as the western coastal track was used along the whole length of the North Island, and the track on the East Coast, which left the coast near Castlepoint and rejoined it near Napier. In the South Island, another major track existed down the east coast with tributary tracks following streams up to the mountain passes to the West Coast. Mountains, swamp, and dense bush made inland routes tricky to traverse, and early settlers also made use of beaches as roads, for walking, riding horses, and herding sheep. Many farms had access via beaches only, and beaches were used as runways for planes. Some beaches are still used by planes, for example at Ōkārito and on the west coast of Stewart Island.

Initial roads, such as the Great South Road southwards from Auckland, were often built by the British Army to move troops, and were constructed to a comparatively high standard. Early sheep farming required few high-standard roads, but the strong increase in dairy farming in the late 19th century created a strong demand for better links on which the more perishable goods could be transported to market or towards ports for export. In many cases, later roads for motor vehicles follow paths used by bullock carts which followed tracks made for humans. These in turn in some cases became highways – with attendant problems all over New Zealand (but especially in the more mountainous regions), as the geography and contours of a slow-speed road laid out in the first half of the 20th century usually do not conform to safety and comfort criteria of modern motor vehicles.

Early road construction was both hindered and helped by rail transport during the first half century of European settlement. Authorities were reluctant to expend large amounts of capital on more difficult sections of a route where there was a hope that a railway might instead be built. However, where railways were constructed, roads often either preceded them for construction or quickly followed it when the newly accessible land started to be settled more closely.

Rail freight transport was protected by the government from road competition from 1931 to 1982 under the Transport Licensing Act 1931.

The New Zealand highway system was extended massively after World War II. The first motorway was built in the environs of Wellington and opened in 1950, between Takapu Road and Johnsonville. Following heavy investment in road construction from the 1950s onwards, public transport patronage fell nationwide. This has been described, in Auckland's case, as "one of the most spectacular declines in public transport patronage of any developed city in the world".

=== State highway network ===
The New Zealand state highway network is the major national highway network in New Zealand. Nearly 100 roads in the North and South Islands are state highways. All state highways are administered by the NZ Transport Agency Waka Kotahi.

The highways were originally designated using a two-tier system, national (SH 1 to 8) and provincial, with national highways having a higher standard and funding priorities. Now all are state highways, and the network consists of SH 1 running the length of both islands, SH 2 to 5 and 10 to 59 in the North Island, and SH 6 to 8 and 60 to 99 in the South Island, numbered approximately north to south. State highways are marked by red shield-shaped signs with white numbering (shields for the former provincial highways were blue). Road maps usually number state highways in this fashion.

Of the total state highway network, New Zealand currently has 363 km (226 mi) of motorways and expressways with grade-separated access and they carry ten percent of all New Zealand traffic. The majority of the state highway network is made up of single-carriageway roads with one lane each way and at-grade access.

=== Speed limits ===
The default maximum speed limit on the open road is 100 km/h (62 mph) for cars and motorcycles, with 50 km/h (31 mph) the default limit in urban areas. Around 31 km (19 mi) of motorway and expressway in Waikato and the Bay of Plenty have a higher posted speed limit of 110 km/h (68 mph). Speed limits of 10 to 90 km/h (6.2 to 55.9 mph) are also used in increments of 10 km/h (6.2 mph), and the posted speed limit may be more than the allowed speed limit for a particular vehicle type. Speeds are often reduced to 30 km/h (19 mph) beside roadworks.

Private landowners may set their own speed limits, for example 5 km/h (3 mph), although these are not enforced by police of road authorities.

The Land Transport Rule: Setting of Speed Limits (2017) allows road controlling authorities to set enforceable speed limits, including permanent speed limits, of less than 50 km/h on roads within their jurisdiction.

=== Road safety ===
Total road deaths in New Zealand are high by developed country standards. 2010 figures from the International Transport Forum placed New Zealand 25th out of 33 surveyed countries in terms of road deaths per capita, a rank that has changed little in 30 years. The fatality rate per capita is twice the level of Germany's, or that of the United Kingdom, Sweden or the Netherlands (2010 comparison). This is variously blamed on aggressive driving, insufficient driver training, old and unsafe cars, inferior road design and construction, and a lack of appreciation of the skill and responsibility required to safely operate a motor vehicle.

In 2010, 375 'road users' were killed in New Zealand, while 14,031 were injured, with 15- to 24-year-olds the group at highest risk. The three most common vehicle movements resulting in death or injury were "head-on collisions (while not overtaking)", "loss of control (on straight)" and "loss of control (while cornering)". In terms of deaths per 10,000 population, the most dangerous areas were the Waitomo District (121 deaths) and the Mackenzie District (110). Larger cities were comparatively safe, with Auckland City (28), Wellington (22) and Christchurch (28), while Dunedin had a higher rate of 43.

New Zealand has a large number of overseas drivers (tourists, business, students and new immigrants), as well as renting campervans/motorhomes/RV's during the New Zealand summer. Overseas licensed drivers are significantly more likely to be found at fault in a collision in which they are involved (66.9%), compared to fully licensed New Zealand drivers (51.9%), and only slightly less likely to be found at fault than restricted (novice) New Zealand drivers (68.9%).

Drink driving is a major issue in New Zealand, especially among young drivers. New Zealand has relatively low penalties for drink driving. In the late 2000s, reports indicated that the rate of drink driving by under 20s in Auckland had risen 77% in three years, with similar increases in the rest of the country. Many drunk drivers already had convictions for previous drink driving.

The road toll has decreased over the 5 years from 421 in 2007 to 284 in 2011

In the 'Safer Journeys' Strategy, intended to guide road safety developments between 2010 and 2020, the Ministry of Transport aims for a 'safe systems' approach, prioritised four areas, being "Increasing the safety of young drivers", "Reducing alcohol/drug impaired driving", "Safe roads and roadsides" and "Increasing the safety of motorcycling".

=== Funding ===
Historically, most roads in New Zealand were funded by local road authorities (often road boards) who derived their income from local rates. As the need for new roads was often most urgent in those parts of the country where little rate income could yet be collected, the funding was at least partly dependent on national-level subsidies, for which much lobbying was undertaken. Many acts and ordinances were passed in the first decades of the colony, but lack of funds and parochialism (the desire to spend locally raised money locally, rather than use it to link different provinces) hindered the growth of the road network. This lack of larger-scale planning eventually led to increased public works powers given to the Central Government.

All funding for state highways and around 50% of funding for local roads comes directly from road users through the National Land Transport Fund. Road user revenue directed to the fund includes all fuel excise duty on LPG and CNG, around 55% of revenue from fuel excise duty on petrol, all revenue from road user charges (a prepaid distance/weight licence that all vehicles over 3.5 tonnes, and all non-petrol/LPG/CNG vehicles are liable to pay) and most non-ACC revenue from motor vehicle registration and licensing fees. In addition, in the last three years the government has increasingly allocated additional funds to land transport, to the extent that today the total expenditure by the NZ Transport Agency Waka Kotahi on land transport projects exceeds road tax revenue collected. The remainder of funding for local city and district roads primarily comes from local authority property rates.

As of 2010, transport funding in New Zealand is still heavily biased towards road projects – the National government proposes to spend $21 billion on roading infrastructure after 2012, yet only $0.7 billion on other transport projects (public transport, walking and cycling). This has been criticised by opponents of the current government strategy as irresponsible, in light of increasing fuel prices and congestion. Government has claimed that their priority on roads is in line with New Zealanders' favoured travel modes, and as being the most promising in terms of economic benefits.

=== Vehicle fleet ===
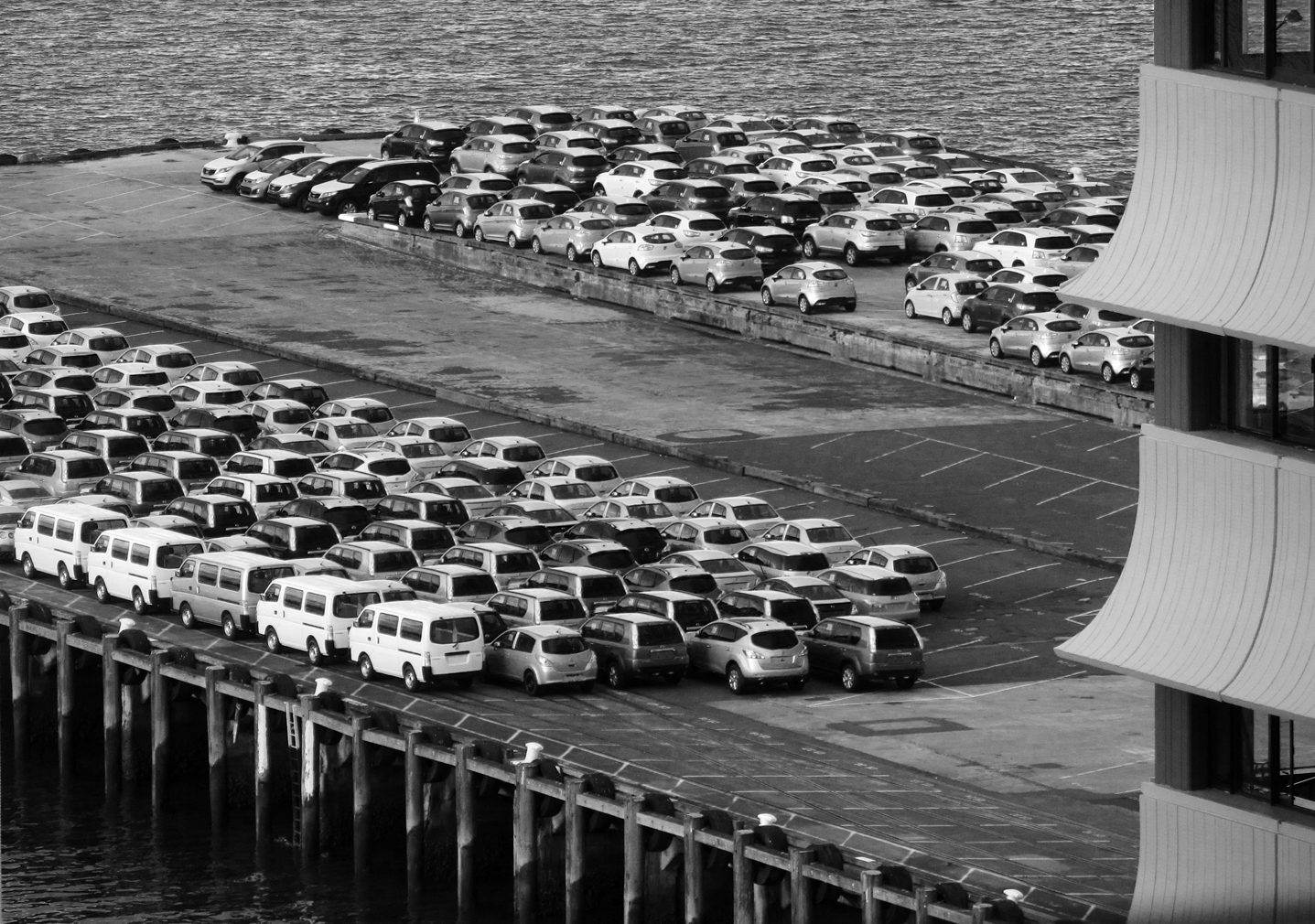
Imported cars on Auckland wharf

One of the earliest counts/estimates of motor vehicles in New Zealand had them at 82,000 in 1925. This soon increased to 170,000 on the eve of World War II in 1939, continuing to 425,000 in 1953 and increasing to 1,000,000 in 1971. In the first national vehicle registration of 1925, 99,233 plates were issued. In 1931 156,180 motor-vehicles were registered and those licensed were 298,586 in 1939 and 380,503 in 1950.

Just over half of the light passenger vehicles first registered in New Zealand are used imports. In 2013 new car registrations were up 7% on 2012 to 82,235 sold, with used vehicle sales up to 98,971.

At the 2013 New Zealand census, 92.1 percent of households reported owning at least one car; 37.6 percent reported owning one car, 38.4 percent reported as owning two cars, and 16.1 percent reported owing three or more cars. Car ownership was highest in the Tasman Region (95.9 percent) and lowest in the Wellington Region (88.3 percent).

In 2015, 3.018 million were light passenger vehicles, 507,000 were light commercial vehicles, 137,000 were heavy trucks, 10,000 were buses and 160,000 were motorcycles and mopeds. The mean age of a New Zealand car (as of end of 2015) was 14.2 years, with trucks at 17.6 years. 38% of light vehicles in 2017 were 15 years +, 171,000 being deregistered, but 334,000 added.

| Year | All vehicles | Light vehicles (under 3.5t) | Billion vehicle kilometres |
|---|---|---|---|
| 2019 | 4,403,690 | 4,022,019 | 48.7 |
| 2018 | 4,275,026 | 3,907,482 | |
| 2017 | 4,154,897 | 3,799,023 | 48.21 |
| 2016 | 3,977,966 | 3,636,985 | 45.49 |
| 2015 | 3,810,823 | 3,482,722 | 43.41 |
| 2014 | 3,674,721 | 3,358,816 | 41.83 |
| 2013 | 3,545,650 | 3,243,166 | 40.78 |
| 2010 | 3,414,052 | 3,122,121 | 40.53 |
| 2001 | 2,757,190 | 2,563,467 | 36.61 |

By 2017 there were 792 light vehicles per 1,000 people, one of the highest vehicle ownerships in the world and they covered 9,265 km/capita.

Average engine capacity of light vehicles grew to 2010 and was about 2,290cc in 2017, with average CO_{2} emissions about 180 g/km.

=== Freight ===
Freight tonne-km in 2017, were up 7.3% to 25.3 billion tkm from 23.6 billion tkm in 2016.

Modal share of freight operations in 2017/18
| Mode | Total weight | | Weight × Distance | |
| Mode | Million tonnes | Percent of total | Billion tonne-kms | Percent of total |
|---|---|---|---|---|
| Rail | 15.9 | 5 | 3.5 | 12 |
| Coastal shipping | 4.6 | 2 | 4 | 13 |
| Road | 269.8 | 93 | 23.1 | 75 |
| Total | 290.3 | | 30.6 | |

=== Passenger services ===
Without rapid transit, transport by bus services form the main component of public transport services in New Zealand cities, and the country also has a network of long-distance bus or coach services, augmented by door-to-door inter-city shuttle vans, a type of shared taxi.

The first widespread motor vehicle services were shared taxi services termed service cars; a significant early provider was Aard, operating elongated Hudson Super Sixes. By 1920 AARD covered most of the North Island and even provided transport for the Prince of Wales. By 1924 the services covered even more areas. Aard was taken over by New Zealand Railways Road Services in 1928. The road fleet of New Zealand Railways Corporation was privatised in 1991 with the long-distance business still existing as InterCity, having more recently incorporated Newmans Coachlines. Another former extensive coach business was Mount Cook Landlines, which closed in the 1990s. Internet-based nakedbus.com is building another nationwide network, partly as a reseller of several smaller bus operators' capacity.

Intercity and Tourism Holdings Ltd are significant sightseeing / tourism coach operators.

=== Cycling ===
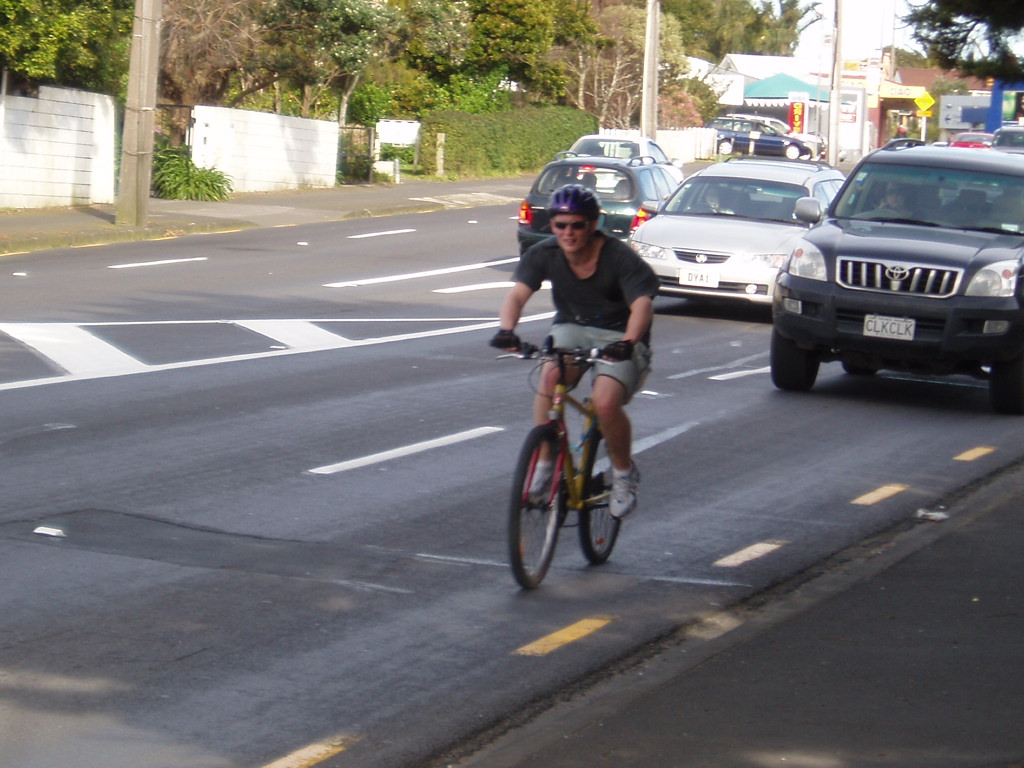
Cycling conditions on Lake Road, North Shore City, prior to the introduction of cycle lanes in the 2000s. Such perceived or actual safety issues discourage many New Zealanders from cycling.

While relatively popular for sport and recreation, bicycle use is a very marginal commuting mode, with the percentage share hovering around 1% in many major cities, and around 2% nationwide (2000s figures). This is primarily due to safety fears. For instance Auckland Regional Transport Authority reports that "over half of Aucklanders believe it is usually unsafe, or always unsafe, to cycle".

The high risk to bicycle users is due to a number of factors. Motorists tend to exhibit hostile attitudes towards bicycle riders. Bicycles are classed as 'vehicles', a transport class legally obliged to use the road, forcing bicycle users to mingle with heavy and fast-moving motor vehicles; only postal workers are legally permitted to ride on footpaths. Bicycle infrastructure and the standards underpinning bicycle infrastructure planning are poor and bicycles receive relatively very low levels of funding by both central and local government. It has also been argued that the introduction of New Zealand's compulsory bicycle helmet law contributed to the decline in the popularity of cycling.

== Rail transport ==
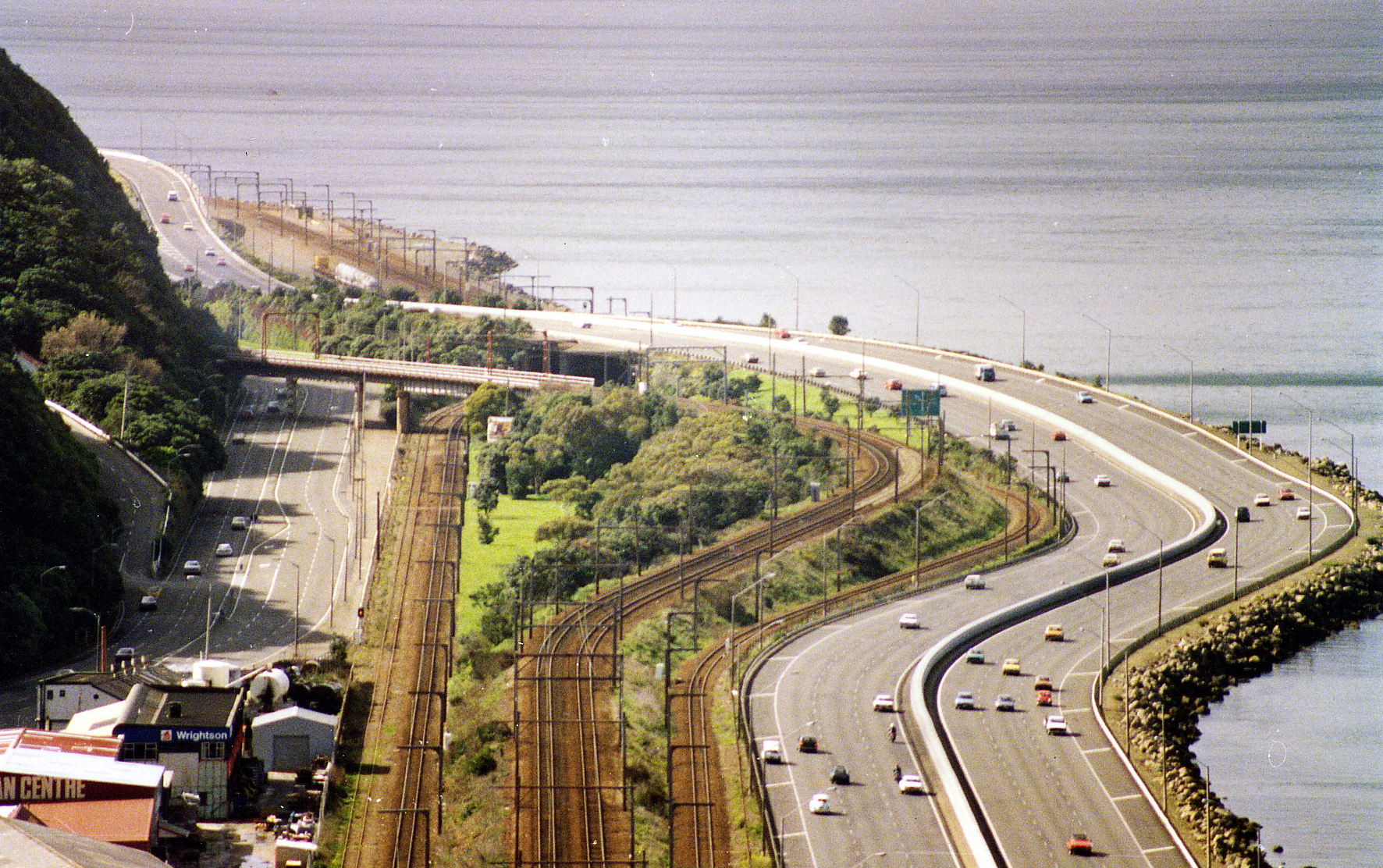
Wellington was for a long time the only city of New Zealand that retained a well-patronised commuter rail system. Only in the 2000s was there a (continuing) resurgence in Auckland's commuter rail patronage, driven in great part by new investment in infrastructure.

=== Network ===
There is a total of 3,898 km of railway line in New Zealand, built to the narrow gauge of 1,067 mm (3 ft 6 in). Of this, 506 km is electrified. The national network's land is owned by New Zealand Railways Corporation, and the network owner and major rail transport operator is the state-owned enterprise KiwiRail. The national network consists of three main trunk lines, seven secondary main lines and during its peak in the 1950s, around ninety branch lines. The majority of the latter are now closed. Most lines were constructed by government but a few were of private origin, later nationalised. In 1931, the Transport Licensing Act was passed, protecting the railways from competition for fifty years. The Railways Corporation was created in 1983 from the New Zealand Railways Department, and the land transport industry became fully deregulated in 1983.

Between 1982 and 1993 the rail industry underwent a major overhaul involving corporatisation, restructuring, downsizing, line and station closures and privatisation. In 1991 the Railways Corporation was split up, with New Zealand Rail Limited established to operate the rail and inter-island ferry services and own the rail network, with the parcels and bus services sold to private investors. The Railways Corporation continued to own the land underneath the rail network, as well as significant property holdings that were disposed of. In 1993 New Zealand Rail was itself privatised and was listed by its new owners in 1995, and renamed Tranz Rail. The government agreed to take over control of the national rail network back when Toll NZ purchased Tranz Rail in 2003, under the auspices of ONTRACK, a division of the Railways Corporation. In May 2008 the government agreed to buy Toll NZ's rail and ferry operations for $665 million, and renamed the operating company KiwiRail.

=== Operators and services ===
Bulk freights dominate services, particularly coal, logs and wood products, milk and milk products, fertiliser, containers, steel and cars. Long distance passenger services are limited to three routes – the TranzAlpine (Christchurch – Greymouth), the Coastal Pacific (Christchurch – Picton) and the Northern Explorer (Wellington – Auckland). Urban rail services operate in Wellington and Auckland, and interurban services run between Palmerston North and Wellington (the Capital Connection), Masterton and Wellington (the Wairarapa Connection), and from April 2021 between Hamilton and Auckland (Te Huia).

For most of its history, New Zealand's rail services were operated by the Railways Department. In 1982, the department was corporatised as the New Zealand Railways Corporation. The Corporation was split in 1990 between a limited liability operating company, New Zealand Rail Limited, and the Corporation which retained a number of assets to be disposed. New Zealand Rail was privatised in 1993, and renamed Tranz Rail in 1995. In 2001, Tranz Rail's long-distance passenger operations, under the guise of Tranz Scenic, became a separate company; Tranz Rail chose not to bid for the contract to run Auckland's rail services, and the contract was won by Connex (now Auckland One Rail). Proposals to sell Tranz Rail's Wellington passenger rail services, Tranz Metro, did not come to fruition, although the division became a separate company in July 2003. In 2003, Tranz Rail was purchased by Australian freight firm Toll Holdings, which renamed the company Toll NZ.

The only other significant non-heritage operator is the tourist oriented Dunedin Railways in Otago, which runs regular passenger trains on part of the former Otago Central Railway and some on the Main South Line. On 20 April 2020 the company announced that due to the COVID-19 pandemic, it mothballed its track and equipment.

=== Heritage ===
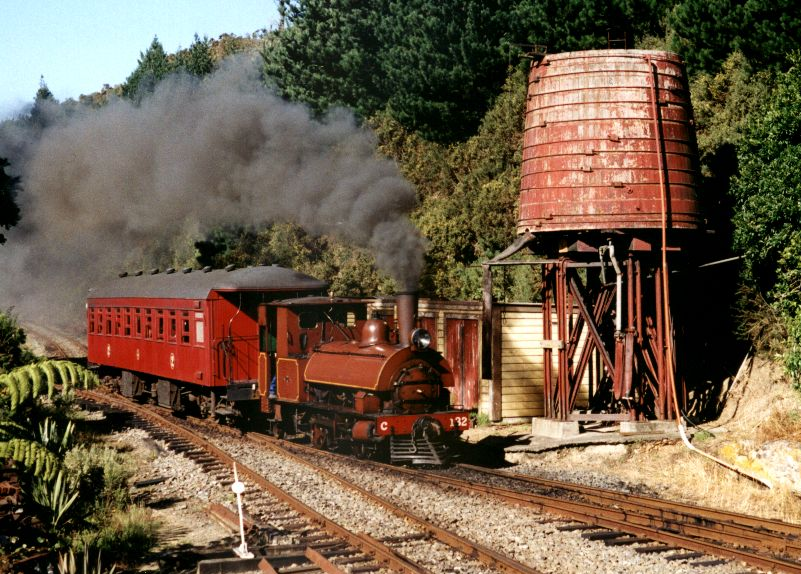
Preserved C class steam locomotive #132 on the heritage Silver Stream Railway, 6 March 2002.

Railway preservation in New Zealand is the preservation of historically significant facets of New Zealand's rail transport history. The earliest recorded preservation attempt took place in 1925, although the movement itself did not start properly until 1960.

== Water transport ==
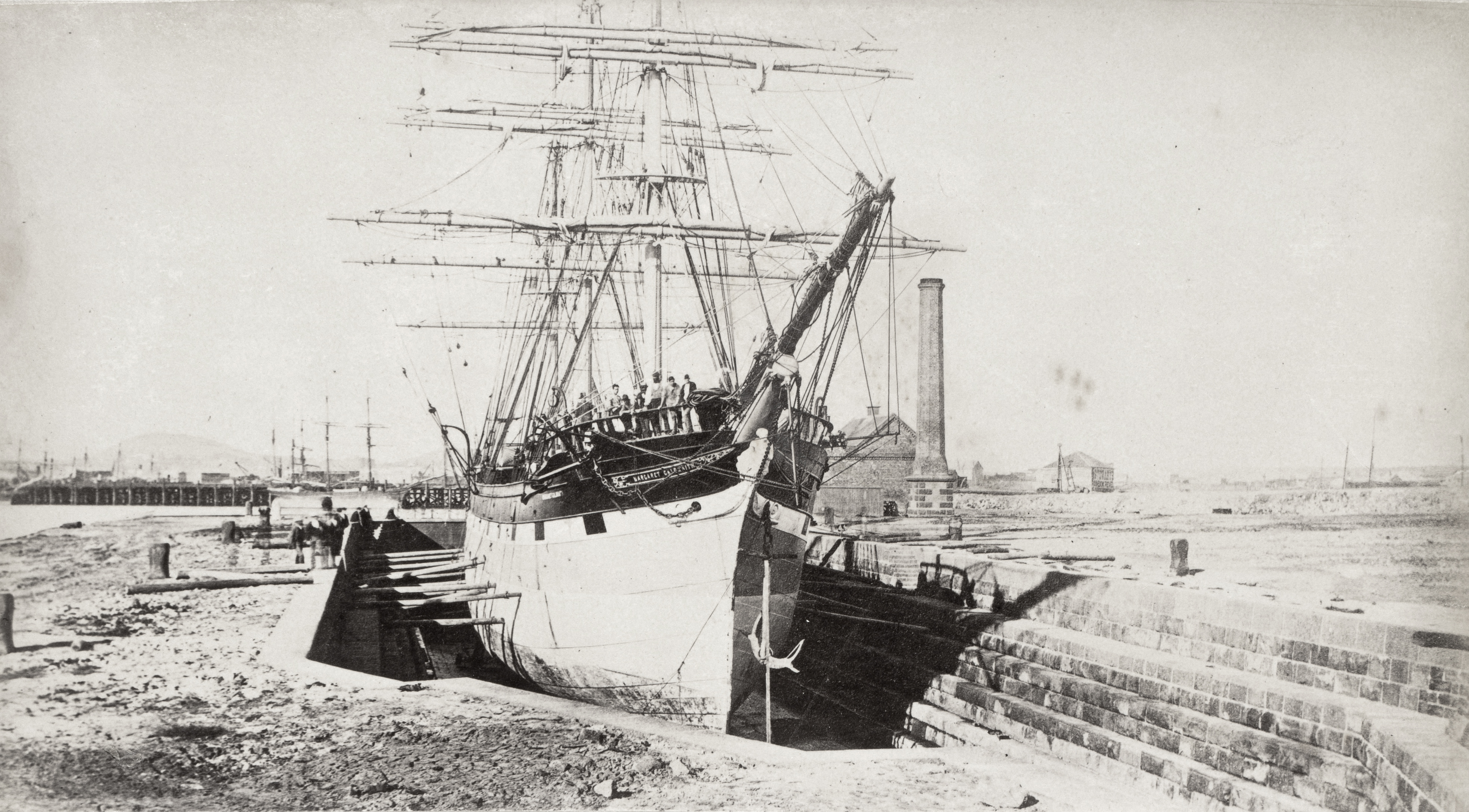
Margaret Galbraith (the first ship to enter the Auckland graving dock,) Auckland, New Zealand, 1878

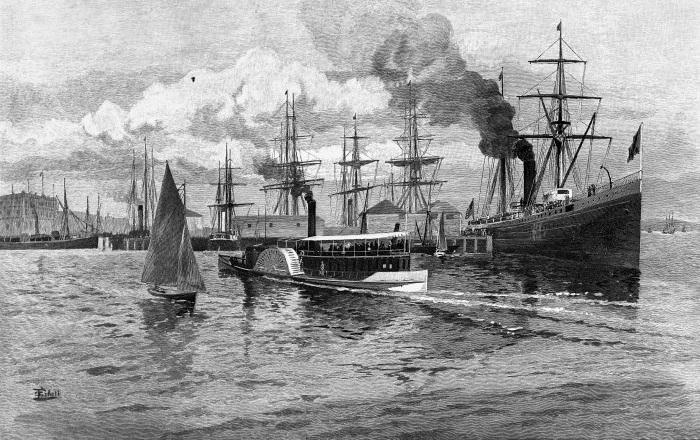
Mail steamer Mariposa casting off in Auckland in the 1880s, with a paddle steamer ferry in the foreground

New Zealand has a long history of international and coastal shipping. Both Maori and the New Zealand European settlers arrived from overseas, and during the early European settler years, coastal shipping was one of the main methods of transportation, while it was hard to move goods to or from the hinterlands, thus limiting the locations of early settlement.

The two main islands are separated by Cook Strait, 24 kilometres or 15 miles wide at its narrowest point, but requiring a 70-km ferry trip to cross. This is the only large-scale long-distance car / passenger shipping service left, with all others restricted to short ferry routes to islands like Stewart Island or Great Barrier Island.

New Zealand has 1,609 kilometres or 1,000 miles of navigable inland waterways; however these are no longer significant transport routes.

=== International shipping ===
Historically, international shipping to and from New Zealand started out with the first explorer-traders, with New Zealand waters soon becoming a favourite goal for whalers as well as merchants trading with the Maori and beginning European colonies.

In the 19th century, one of the most important changes for New Zealand shipping — and for New Zealand itself — came with the introduction of refrigerated ships, which allowed New Zealand to export meat to overseas, primarily to the United Kingdom. This led to a booming agricultural industry which was suddenly offered a way to ship their goods to markets around the world.

Larger, deeper-draught ships from the middle of the 19th century made dredges a common sight in shipping channels around New Zealand, and tugboats were also often bought to assist them to the quays, where electric or hydraulic cranes were increasingly used for on- and off-loading. However, manpower was still needed in large amounts, and waterfronts were the hotbeds of the industrial actions of the early 20th century.

In the 1970s, containerisation revolutionised shipping, eventually coming to New Zealand as well. The local harbour boards wrought massive changes on those ports selected (after much political wrangling) to handle the new giant vessels, such as Lyttelton and Auckland Port. Gantry cranes, straddle carriers and powerful tugboats were built or purchased, and shipping channels dredged deeper, while large areas of land were reclaimed to enable the new container terminals. The changes have been described as having been more radical than the changeover from sail to steam a century before.

However, containerisation made many of the smaller ports suffer, this being only later recovered somewhat with newer, smaller multi-purpose ships that could travel to smaller ports, and the loosening of the trade links with the United Kingdom, which diversified the trade routes. The time for river ports had gone however, and most of them disappeared, facing particular pressure from the new rail ferries, In the 1980s, deregulation also involved and heavily changed the port industry, with harbour boards abolished, and replaced by more commercially focused companies. Many port jobs were lost, though shipping costs fell.

=== Coastal shipping ===
Coastal shipping has long played a significant role in New Zealand. It was very efficient for moving large amounts of goods relatively quickly. In 1910, it was noted in a discussion with the Minister of Railways that a fruit grower at Port Albert (near Wellsford, less than 150 km from Auckland) had found it cheaper to ship his canned fruit to Lyttelton in the South Island by boat, and thence back to Auckland again, rather than pay rail freight rates from nearby Wellsford to Auckland.

The industry however also faced a number of troubled times as well, such as during World War II when ship requisitioning caused shortages in the transport operation. While many ports reopened after the war, they faced huge pressure from rail

After cabotage was abolished in 1994, international shipping lines became able to undertake coastal shipping as opportune to them on their international routes to New Zealand. While reducing the cargo reshipment rates for New Zealand industry, this is seen by some as a heavy blow for local competitors, who, specialised in coastal shipping only, are less able to achieve the costs savings of large lines – these can generally operate profitably even without cargo on New Zealand-internal legs of their routes, and are thus able to underbid others. The law change has been accused of having turned the New Zealand business into a 'sunset industry' which will eventually die out.

In the financial year 2003 / 2004 coastal cargo in New Zealand totalled around 8.6 million tonnes, of which 85% was still carried by local, and 15% by overseas shipping.

In 2009, the National Party announced that funding for coastal shipping and supporting infrastructure, part of the "Sea Change" plan of the previous Labour government, would be cut to a substantial degree. The move was heavily criticised, amongst others, by the Green Party, and the Maritime Union of New Zealand.

In 2017/18 coastal shipping carried about 11 million tonnes, or roughly 4% of New Zealand's freight of 278.7 million tonnes and 30.1 billion tonne-kilometres. About 4 million tonnes is on the inter-island ferries. Tankers carried 2.7 million tonnes of oil, mainly from Marsden Point. About 2 million tonnes travelled between the container ports. 1.3 million tonnes of cement was carried. Most of the other million tonnes travelled on ferries to the smaller islands.

=== Ferry services ===
==== Cook Strait ====
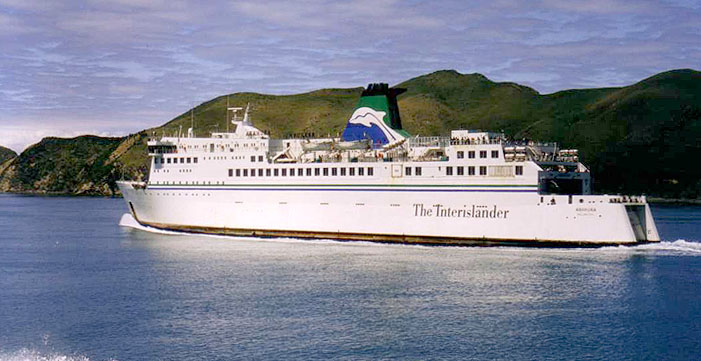
Interislander's Arahura in the Marlborough Sounds

Two companies run ferries across the Cook Strait.

Interislander is a road and rail ferry service across New Zealand's Cook Strait, between Wellington in the North Island and Picton in the South Island. It is owned and operated by state-owned rail operator KiwiRail. Two roll-on roll-off (RORO) vessels operate the 50-nautical-mile (93 km; 58 mi) route, taking about three hours to complete the crossing.

The inter-island rail ferry service began in August 1962, operated by the New Zealand Railways Department (NZR). The service primarily provided a RORO rail link between its North and South Island networks, allowing NZR to compete directly with coastal shipping companies for inter-island freight. It also provided the first RORO road link between the two islands, which saw the Wellington to Picton ferries compete with, and then completely replace, the Union Company's Wellington–Lyttelton ferry service. Today, the Interislander service is still well patronised despite competition with Bluebridge on the Wellington–Picton sea route and from airlines, carrying around one million passengers and 230,000 vehicles per year on 5,500 sailings.

In 2017, Interislander became part of Great Journeys New Zealand, a new tourism brand created by KiwiRail to unite its four scenic passenger services: Interislander, Northern Explorer, Coastal Pacific and the TranzAlpine.

StraitNZ, formerly Strait Shipping, is a New Zealand transport firm that operates roll-on/roll-off freight and passenger shipping across Cook Strait between Wellington in the North Island and Picton in the South Island, and trucking and logistics services across New Zealand. Originally a freight-only service, passenger services commenced in 2002 and operate under the Bluebridge brand. As of 2021, Bluebridge holds 56% of the market for vehicle freight and 31% of the market for passenger services across Cook Strait. The company was acquired on 31 March 2022 by Morgan Stanley

Depending on the vessel, usual transit time between the North and South Islands is 3 to 3.5 hours. Faster catamaran ferries were used by Tranz Rail and its competitors between 1994 and 2004. To reduce voyage times, Tranz Rail proposed to relocate the South Island terminal of its services to Clifford Bay in Marlborough, which would also avoid a steep section of railway. This proposal has been shelved since the takeover by Toll Holdings in 2003.

==== Wellington to Lyttelton ====
Union Steam Ship began regular sailings between Wellington and Lyttelton in 1895 with the Penguin making two round trips a week. In 1905 this became a daily service year round. In 1933 the name "Steamer Express" was adopted for the service. Over the years a number of ships were used, including two Maoris, two Wahines, two Rangatiras, and a Hinemoa.

TEV Wahine entered service in October 1966 and foundered and sank at the mouth of Wellington Harbour 18 months later in April 1968. The TEV Rangatira entered service in 1972 and was withdrawn in 1976, bringing the Wellington–Lyttelton "Steamer Express" to an end.

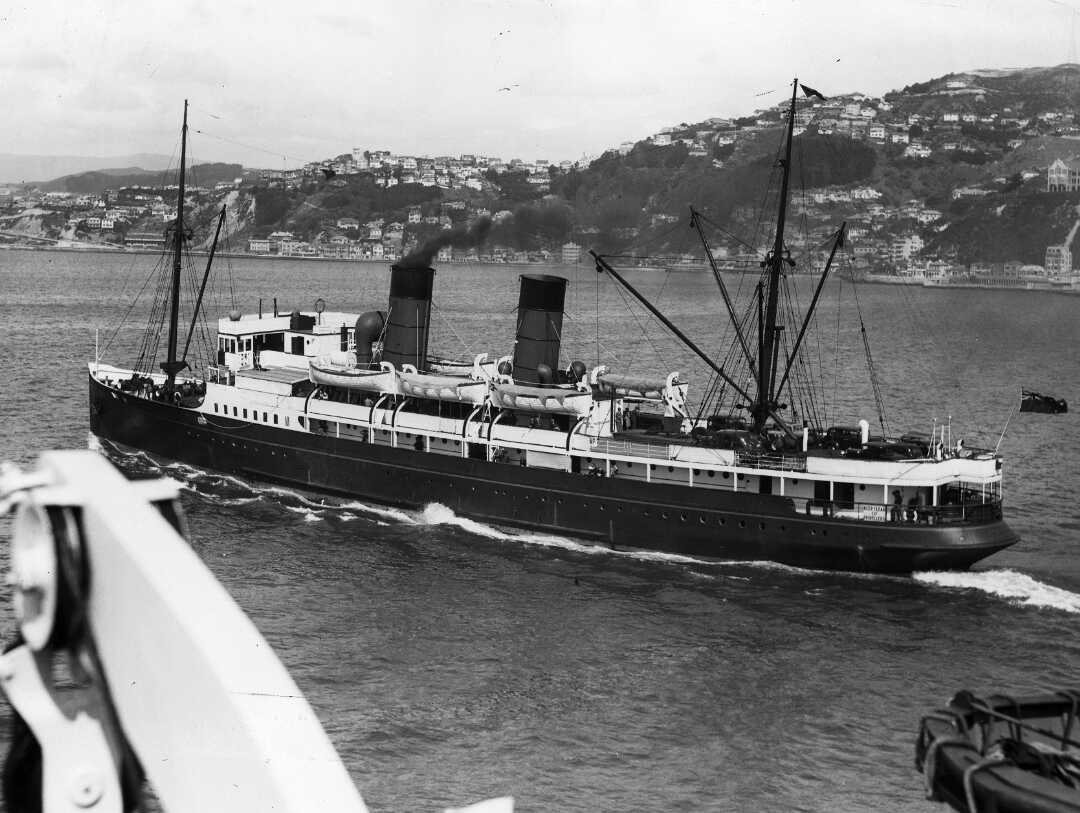
Tamahine, built in 1925 and retired in 1962

==== Other ferry services ====
Smaller ferries operate in the Bay of Islands, the Hokianga Harbour, the Hauraki Gulf / Tīkapa Moana and Waitematā Harbour, Tauranga Harbour, Wellington, the Marlborough Sounds, Lyttelton, between Bluff and Halfmoon Bay on Stewart Island, and elsewhere.

=== Ports and harbours ===
==== Container ports ====
Port of Auckland Limited (POAL), the successor to the Auckland Harbour Board, is the Auckland Council-owned company administering Auckland's commercial freight and cruise ship harbour facilities. As the company operates all of the associated facilities in the Greater Auckland area (excluding the ferry terminals and local marinas for recreational yachting), this article is about both the current company and the ports of Auckland themselves.

The Port of Tauranga is situated in Tauranga, New Zealand. It is the largest port in the country both in terms of total cargo volume, and in terms of container throughput with container volumes exceeding 1.2 million TEUs (Twenty Foot Equivalent Units). The port is operated by Port of Tauranga Ltd (NZX: POT).

Napier Port is in Napier, New Zealand, on Hawke Bay. It is the North Island's second largest export port by tonnage. It is owned by Napier Port Holdings Limited (NZX: NPH), which is 55% owned by Hawke's Bay Regional Council through its wholly owned subsidiary Hawke's Bay Regional Investment Company, as of November 2024.

CentrePort Wellington (CentrePort) provides land and sea infrastructure and manages port facilities in Wellington Harbour in New Zealand. The company is the successor to the Wellington Harbour Board, and was formed as one of the outcomes of the 1989 local government reforms. This article is about both the company and the port.

Port Nelson is the maritime gateway for the Nelson, Tasman and Marlborough regions and an important hub for economic activity.

Lyttelton has long been the main port of the Canterbury / Christchurch area, having been opened in 1877 by the Lyttelton Harbour Board, later becoming the Lyttelton Port Company with the introduction of the Port Companies Act in 1988.

Timaru is an agricultural service town and port for the South Canterbury regional economy. Timaru is one of the major cargo ports of the South Island, and also the second largest fishing port in New Zealand. The port receives frequent cruise ships throughout the summer months.

As Dunedin grew, and particularly with the increase in commerce following the Otago gold rush of the 1860s, the merchants of Dunedin pushed for dredging of a channel to allow ocean-going vessels to reach the city's wharves. Though a contentious decision, it was agreed to dredge what became known as the Victoria Ship Channel along the north-western side of the harbour. The channel opened in 1881. The initial channel was narrow and shallow, and the first ship to use it (the Union Steam Ship Company's SS Penguin) temporarily grounded while using it. The channel was gradually widened and deepened, and by 1907, twice as many ships were using Dunedin's wharves as used Port Chalmers. Rivalry between Dunedin and Port Chalmers developed over which would handle the bulk of shipping. However, ship servicing and building industries developed in Port Chalmers, and the adjacent Carey's Bay became a fishing port.

Bluff's port facilities are the southernmost in the South Island, and include the country's southernmost commercial deep water port. The port operates under the commercial name of South Port NZ from a 40-hectare (99-acre) artificial island, Island Harbour, and includes a container terminal. Island Harbour was constructed over the course of the 1950s, and was officially opened in December 1960. A major cargo from the port is alumina from the Tiwai Point Aluminium Smelter, which sits on Tiwai Point, the low-lying eastern shore of the harbour's mouth, directly opposite Island Harbour.

==== Other ports ====
Whangārei, Gisborne, New Plymouth, Whanganui, Picton, Westport, Greymouth

- Freshwater: Rotorua (Lake Rotorua), Taupō (Lake Taupō), Queenstown and Kingston (Lake Wakatipu), Te Anau and Manapouri (Lake Manapouri)

=== Merchant marine fleet ===
Ships by type
Bulk 3, cargo 3, chemical tanker 1, container 1, passenger/cargo 5, petroleum tanker 2
total: 15 (as of 2015)

As of 2021 the current container ship is the 1700 teu Moana Chief, which is operated by Pacifica Shipping, a subsidiary of the China Navigation Company, and was introduced in 2019.

==== History ====
Government subsidies were used to establish routes, or increase frequencies. For example, in 1902 up to £30,000 a year was being offered to provide ships linking to specified South African ports. The merchant marine was affected by World War 2, but by 1950 the flagged fleet totalled 2,884.

== Air transport ==
New Zealand's air travel sector is served by 15 airlines. The largest airline is Air New Zealand, a state-owned flag carrier.

=== Airports ===
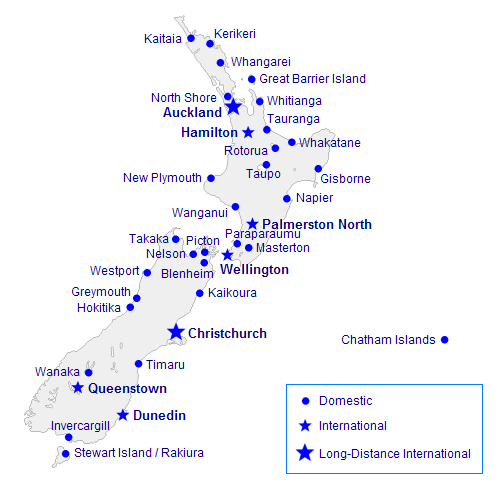
Map of New Zealand airports that have scheduled air services

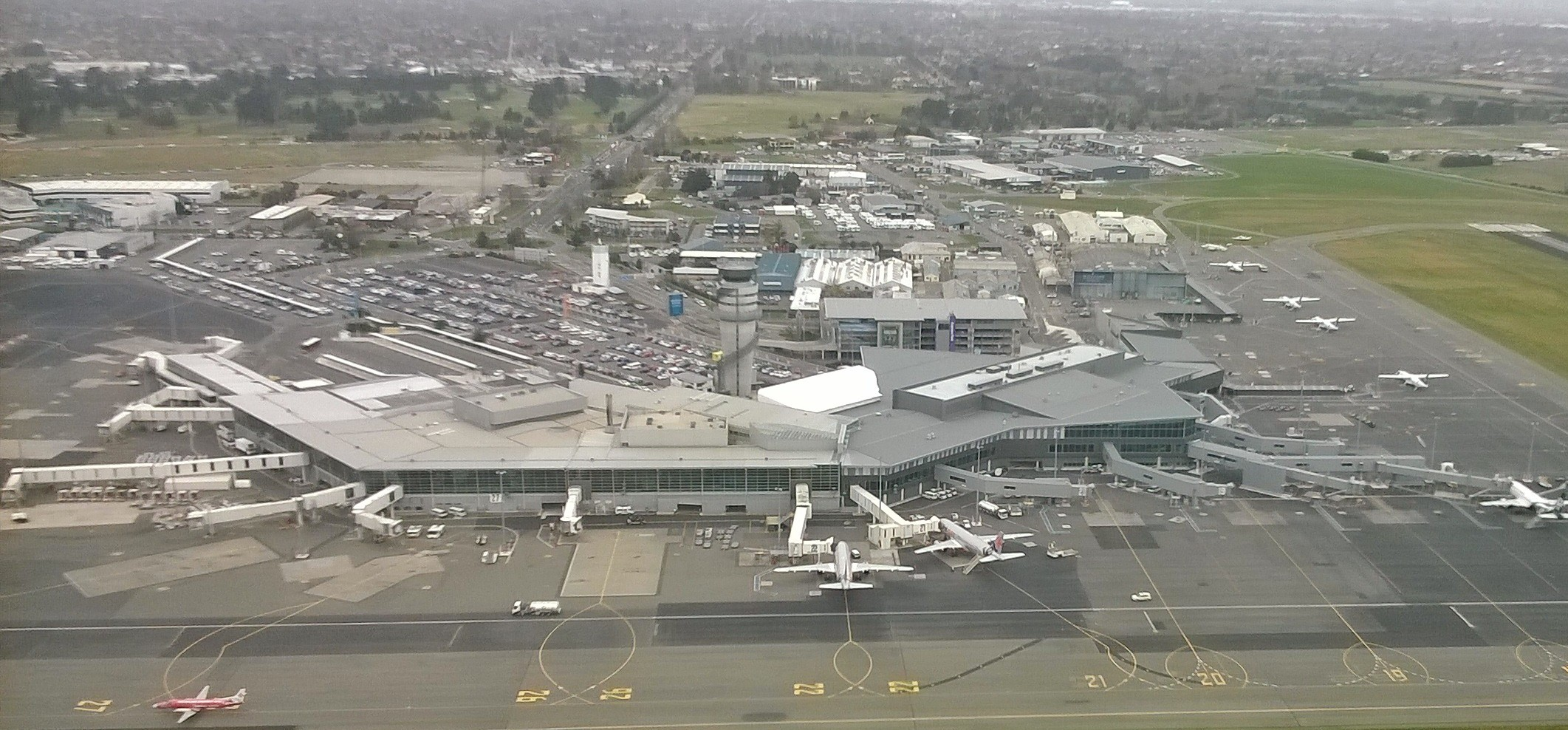
Christchurch Airport terminal, the largest in the South Island

There are 123 airports (including aerodromes) in New Zealand. Five provide international air services (as well as domestic services); Auckland and Christchurch (the largest airports in the North and South Islands, respectively) provide long-haul and short-haul international services; and Wellington, Dunedin and Queenstown provide short-haul international services to Australia and Fiji. About 30 other airports provide scheduled domestic air services. The busiest airport is Auckland, which handled 16,487,648 (9,005,612 international and 7,482,036 domestic) passengers in the year ended December 2015.

==== With paved runways ====
total: 39 (as of 2015)
over 3,047 metres (10,000 ft): 2
2,438 metres (8,000 ft) to 3,047 metres (10,000 ft): 1
1,524 metres (5,000 ft) to 2,437 metres (8,000 ft): 12
914 metres (3,000 ft) to 1,523 metres (5,000 ft): 23
under 914 metres (3,000 ft): 1

==== With unpaved runways ====
total: 84 (as of 2015)
1,524 metres (5,000 ft) to 2,437 metres (8,000 ft): 3
914 metres (3,000 ft) to 1,523 metres (5,000 ft): 33
under 914 metres (3,000 ft): 48

==== Busiest international air routes ====
Busiest international air routes to and from New Zealand (year to 31 March 2024)
| Rank | New Zealand airport | Overseas airport | Passengers |
|---|---|---|---|
| 1 | Auckland | (Australia) Sydney | 1,451,904 |
| 2 | Auckland | (Australia) Melbourne | 993,122 |
| 3 | Auckland | (Australia) Brisbane | 827,016 |
| 4 | Auckland | Singapore | 584,488 |
| 5 | Auckland | (Fiji) Nadi | 556,651 |
| 6 | Christchurch | (Australia) Sydney | 489,834 |
| 7 | Queenstown | (Australia) Sydney | 399,002 |
| 8 | Auckland | (United States) Los Angeles | 328,313 |
| 9 | Wellington | (Australia) Sydney | 314,287 |
| 10 | Auckland | (China) Shanghai | 316,375 |
| 11 | Auckland | (Australia) Gold Coast | 311,371 |
| 12 | Christchurch | (Australia) Melbourne | 276,724 |
| 13 | Auckland | Hong Kong | 273,222 |
| 14 | Auckland | (Cook Islands) Rarotonga | 263,859 |
| 15 | Queenstown | (Australia) Melbourne | 258,546 |

=== Heliports ===
New Zealand has 55 functioning heliports (and helipads), including 36 hospital heliports.

== Carbon emissions ==
The government recognises that, to comply with its Zero Carbon 2050 legislation, transport emissions need to be reduced. 47% of the country’s total domestic CO_{2} emissions come from transport. Since 1990, road transport emissions have more than doubled, forming 91% of transport emissions in 2019. Domestic aviation adds 6%, coastal shipping 2% and rail 1%.

== See also ==
- Automotive industry in New Zealand
- Bridges in New Zealand
- Plug-in electric vehicles in New Zealand
- Shipwrecks of Southland
- Trams in New Zealand
- Trolleybus systems in New Zealand
- Tunnels in New Zealand
