= History of cycling in New Zealand =

The bicycle originally reached New Zealand in the 1860s in the form of the velocipede, also known as the 'boneshaker'. These bikes, as elsewhere, soon evolved into the elegant 'high wheelers', known today as penny-farthings. Popular among wealthy young men, these offered adventure and speed ("Colonials like to get along fast", one newspaper wrote), but were also dangerous due to the lack of modern features like efficient brakes. Additionally the fact that they were useless on the rough and hilly roads of most of the country, ensured that they were seldom used for anything other than sport and recreation.

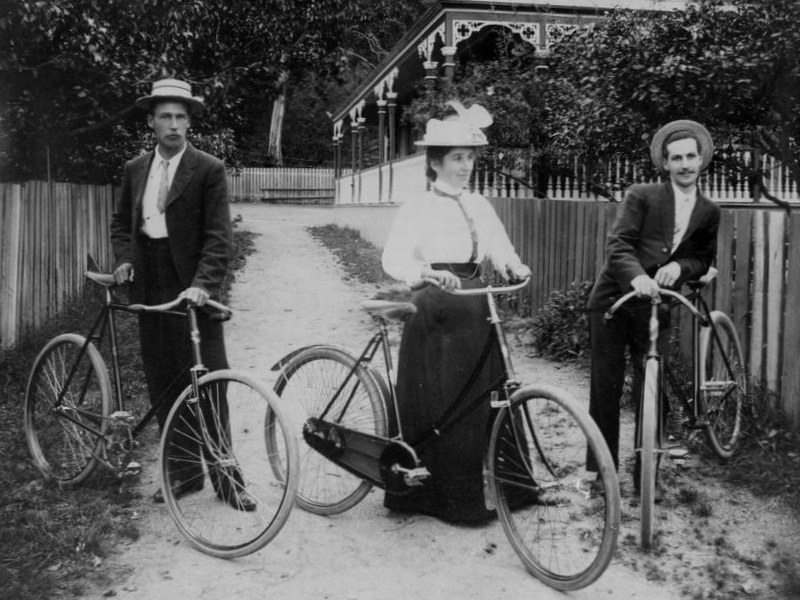
Cyclists in Thames, New Zealand, around 1895

By the late 1880s, the safety bicycle was being produced: with a lower frame and pneumatic tyres, it was a popular model for women to ride, and consequently brought about a new form of freedom for them. Kate Sheppard was involved with the first cycle club in Christchurch in 1892: the Atalanta Cycle Club. The bicycle has therefore been credited as significant in bringing women's enfranchisement to New Zealand.

It was the safety bicycle, with its chain, sprockets and similar sized wheels that catapulted the bicycle into the public arena. Sales boomed, prices dropped and, for half a century, the bicycle became a transport of the masses, at least in the somewhat more level and developed areas of the country.

Cycle tracks were being built alongside some main roads in 1949 and 1950.

However, in the 1950s and 60s, driven by rising affluence and government transport policies, New Zealanders turned away from most other transport methods to become one of the countries with the highest car ownership ratios in the world. This largely relegated cycling once again to recreational and sports use.

The oil shocks of the 1970s triggered the first of several bicycle resurgences. New bicycles became popular: first, road racing bikes, then BMXs and eventually mountain bikes. By 1990, a survey showed cycling to be the second most popular participation sport in New Zealand. Since then, cycle sales have remained high, averaging over 150,000 per annum.

From January 1994 the wearing of bicycle helmets in New Zealand became mandatory for all ages of people using a bicycle.

== See also ==
- Bicycle helmets in New Zealand
- Cycling Action Network
