= Branch River (Taylor River tributary) =

Coordinates: 41.675471°S 173.184583°E

Location
- Country: New Zealand

Physical characteristics
- Mouth
  - location: Taylor River
- Length: 10 km (6 mi)

The Branch River is a river of New Zealand. It is a short tributary of the Taylor River, flowing north for 10 kilometres (6 mi) to meet the Taylor 12 kilometres (7 mi) south of the town of Blenheim.

== See also ==
- List of rivers of New Zealand
