= Transport Licensing Act 1931 =

Act of Parliament in New Zealand

New Zealand Parliament

Legislative history
- Passed: 1931

Repeals
- 1982

Amended by
- 1933, 1936, 1939, 1962, 1977
- Status: Repealed

The Transport Licensing Act 1931 was a New Zealand Act of Parliament regulating land transport. It was introduced following a Royal Commission on road and rail competition in 1930. The Act also regulated aspects such as safety and insurance requirements for carriers and the regulation of public passenger services.

== Amendments ==
In 1933, the Act was amended to cover all rural road carriers carting in excess of 5 miles (8 km). In 1939, town carriers were regulated.

=== Maximum distance protection ===
In 1936, the protection of railways was extended to cover all freight conveyed over distances greater than those specified by the Act. This was by far the most crucial regulation, as it gave rail an effective monopoly on long-distance freight transport. Originally this limit was 30 miles (48 km). In 1962 it was increased to 40 miles (64 km), and in 1977 to 150 kilometres (93 mi).

=== Livestock ===
In 1961, livestock was exempted from the Transport Licensing Act.

== Repeal ==
The Act was repealed in 1982, effectively deregulating land transport and opening the railways up to competition. The Railways Department was corporatised as the New Zealand Railways Corporation as a result, and throughout the 1980s until the early 1990s lost substantial amounts of freight to road carriers. Freight traffic reached its low point in 1993, and since then railway freight traffic has increased.

== See also ==
- Transport in New Zealand
