= Fairhall River =

Coordinates: 41°31′S 173°53′E

Location
- Country: New Zealand

Physical characteristics
- Source
  - location: Marlborough
- Mouth
  - location: Opawa River

The Fairhall River is a river in the Marlborough region of New Zealand. It arises near Blairich Pass and flows north-east to join the Ōpaoa River between Renwick and Blenheim. The locality of Fairhall is east of the river. The river and locality were named in 1847 for a chainman in a survey team in the area.

A vineyard, Fairhall Downs, was established in the river valley in 1982.

== See also ==
- List of rivers of New Zealand
