= Opava (disambiguation) =

Opava is a city in the Moravian-Silesian Region, Czech Republic.

Opava may also refer to:

- Opava District, a district (okres) within Moravian-Silesian Region of the Czech Republic with capital at Opava
- Opava, Veľký Krtíš District, a village in the Banská Bystrica Region of Slovakia
- Opava (river), a river in the Czech Republic
- Duchy of Opava was a historic territory centered on the city of Opava

== See also ==
- Opawa, a suburb of Christchurch, New Zealand
- Opawa (disambiguation)
- Dukes of Opava, a list of people carrying the title Duke of Opava
