= Taylor River (New Zealand) =

Coordinates: 41.6242°S 173.9503°E

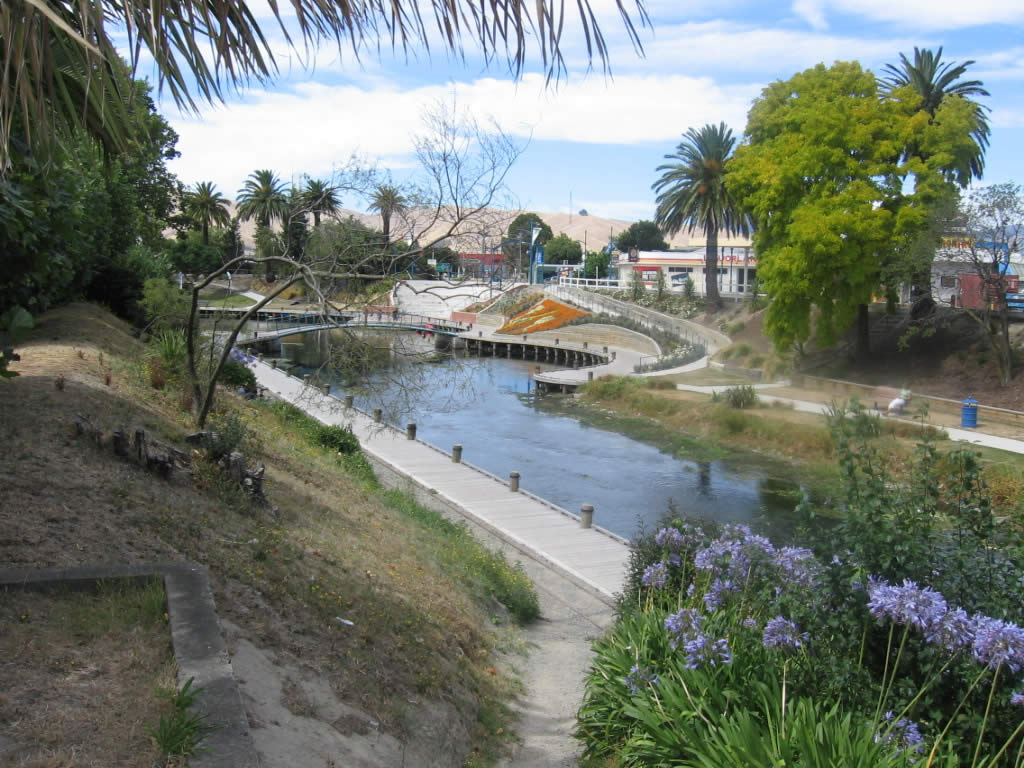
- The Taylor River in central Blenheim

Location
- Country: New Zealand

Physical characteristics
- Source
  - location: Taylor Pass
- Mouth
  - location: Ōpaoa River
- Length: 18 km (11 mi)

The Taylor River is one of the two rivers that flow across the Wairau Plain into Blenheim, New Zealand, where it joins the Ōpaoa River. It arises near Taylor Pass to the south of the Wither Hills and flows north-east and north. The river and pass were named for Joseph Taylor, a New Zealand Company surveyor who worked in the area from 1842.

At the time Blenheim was settled and for some years thereafter, floods were frequent occurrences in winter at the confluence of the two rivers and occasioned the nickname "Beavertown" for Blenheim because of the fancied resemblance to beaver lodges of buildings in the town when surrounded by floodwaters. The town mascot is a beaver in spite of the fact that none have ever existed in New Zealand, as they are a prohibited animal.

== See also ==
- List of rivers of New Zealand
