= Ōpaoa River =

Ōpaoa River Opawa River
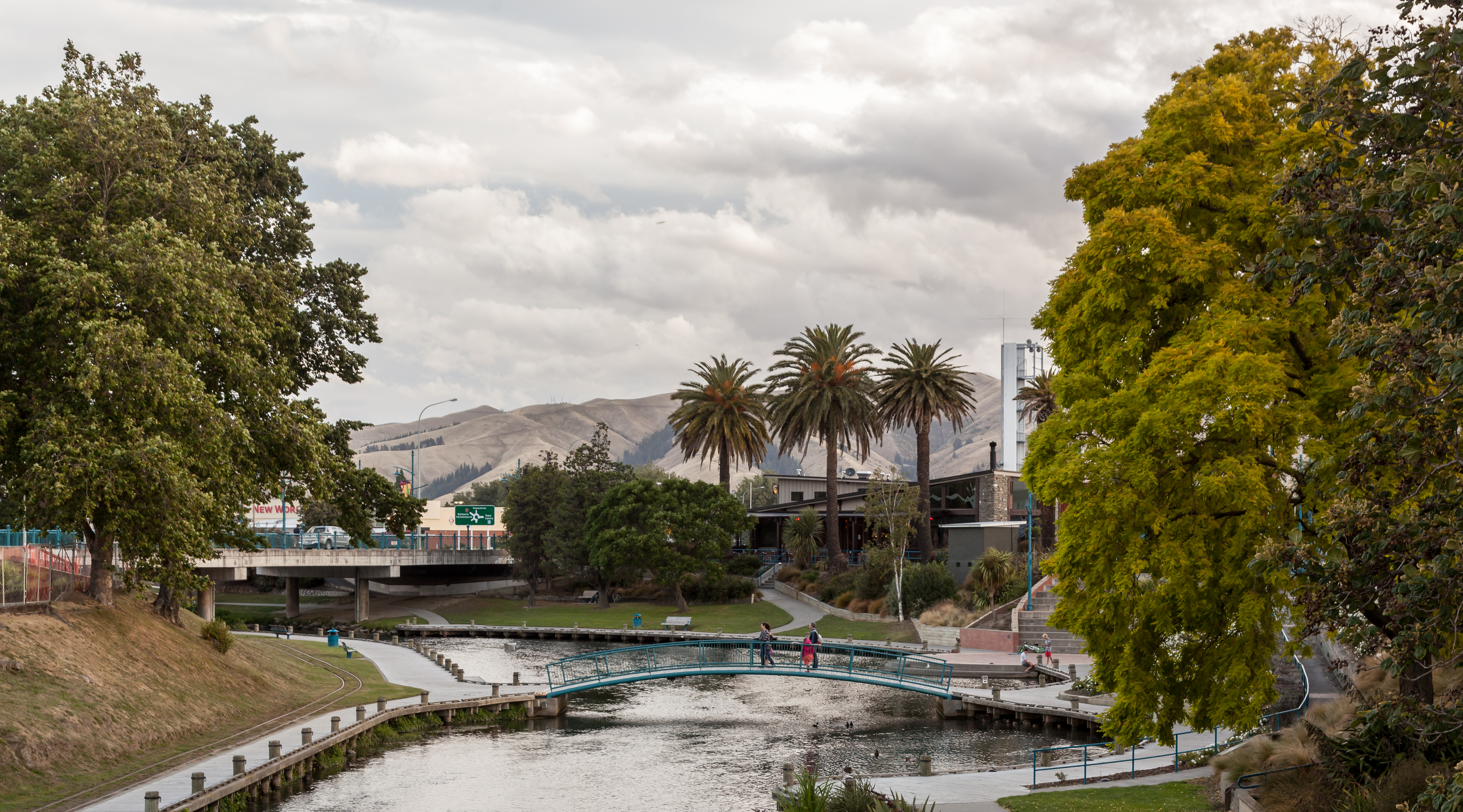
- The Ōpaoa River running through Blenheim
- Native name: Ōpaoa (Māori)

Location
- Country: New Zealand
- Region: Marlborough
- Towns: Blenheim

Physical characteristics
- Mouth
  - location: Big Lagoon
  - coordinates: 41°30′25″S 174°03′00″E

Basin features
- Progression: Omaka River → Ōpaoa River
- Tributaries
  - right: Fairhall River, Taylor River

The Ōpaoa River, formerly called the Opawa River, is in the Marlborough region of the South Island of New Zealand. It begins in the Wairau valley where floodways are joined. It makes its way down the valley and flows through and looping around the eastern suburbs of Blenheim where it is crossed by the Opawa River Bridge. It joins the Taylor River in Blenheim (keeping the Ōpaoa name) and flows into Big Lagoon, the estuary it shares with the southern mouth of the Wairau River at Cloudy Bay.

There are two possible sources for the river's name. It might have been named after the chief Paoa. Rangitāne iwi say that the name Ōpaoa literally means smoky river. With Blenheim built on swampy land, the river was often brown (or 'smoky') as a consequence. In August 2014, the name of the river was officially altered to Ōpaoa River.
