= Opawa, Lower Silesian Voivodeship =

Opawa
- Village
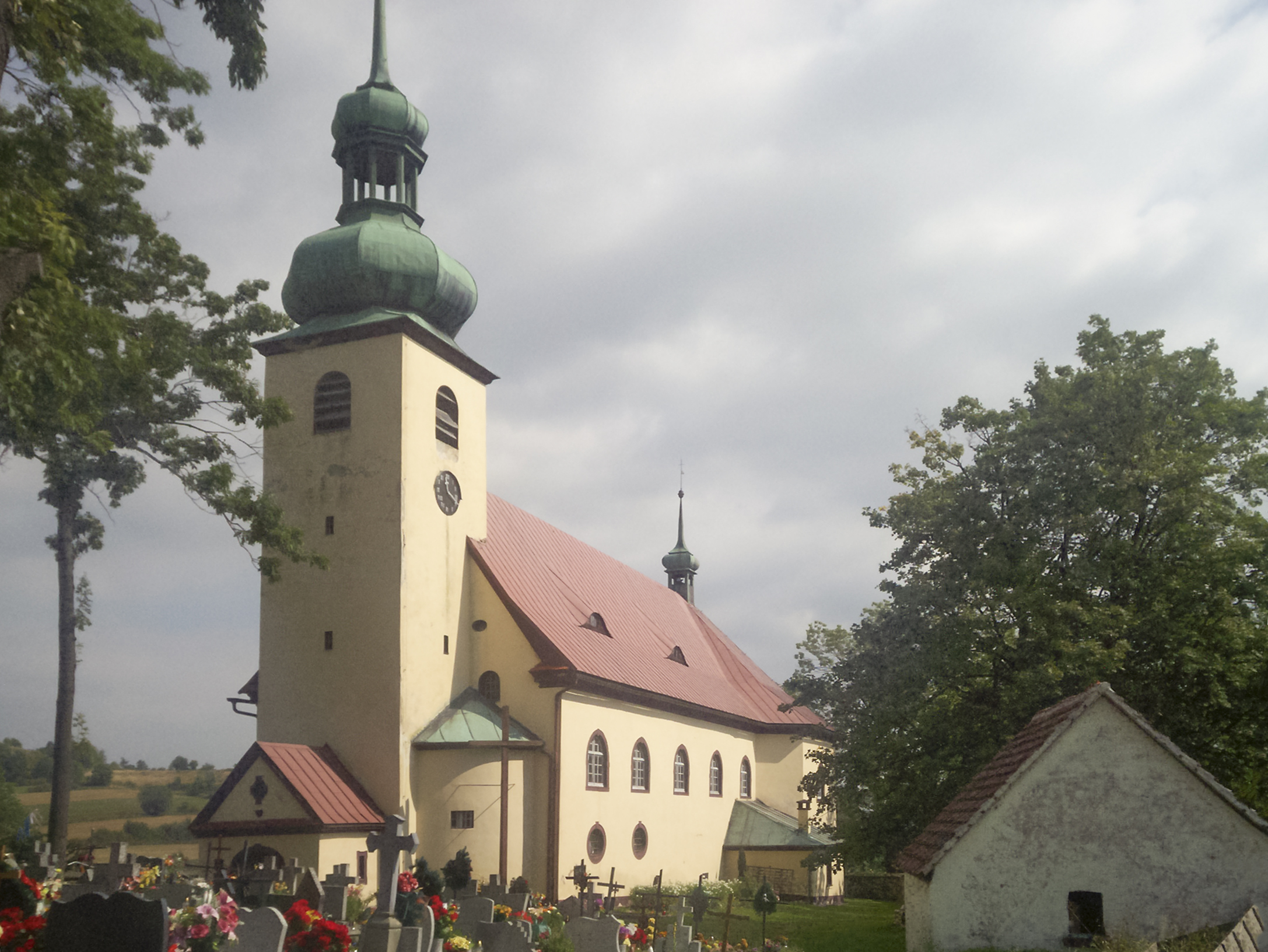
- The Church of Saint Hedwig

- Location within Poland
- Coordinates: 50°42′02″N 15°53′38″E
- Country: Poland
- Voivodeship: Lower Silesian
- County: Kamienna Góra
- Gmina: Lubawka

Opawa [ɔˈpava] is a village in the administrative district of Gmina Lubawka, within Kamienna Góra County, Lower Silesian Voivodeship, in south-western Poland.

== Gallery ==
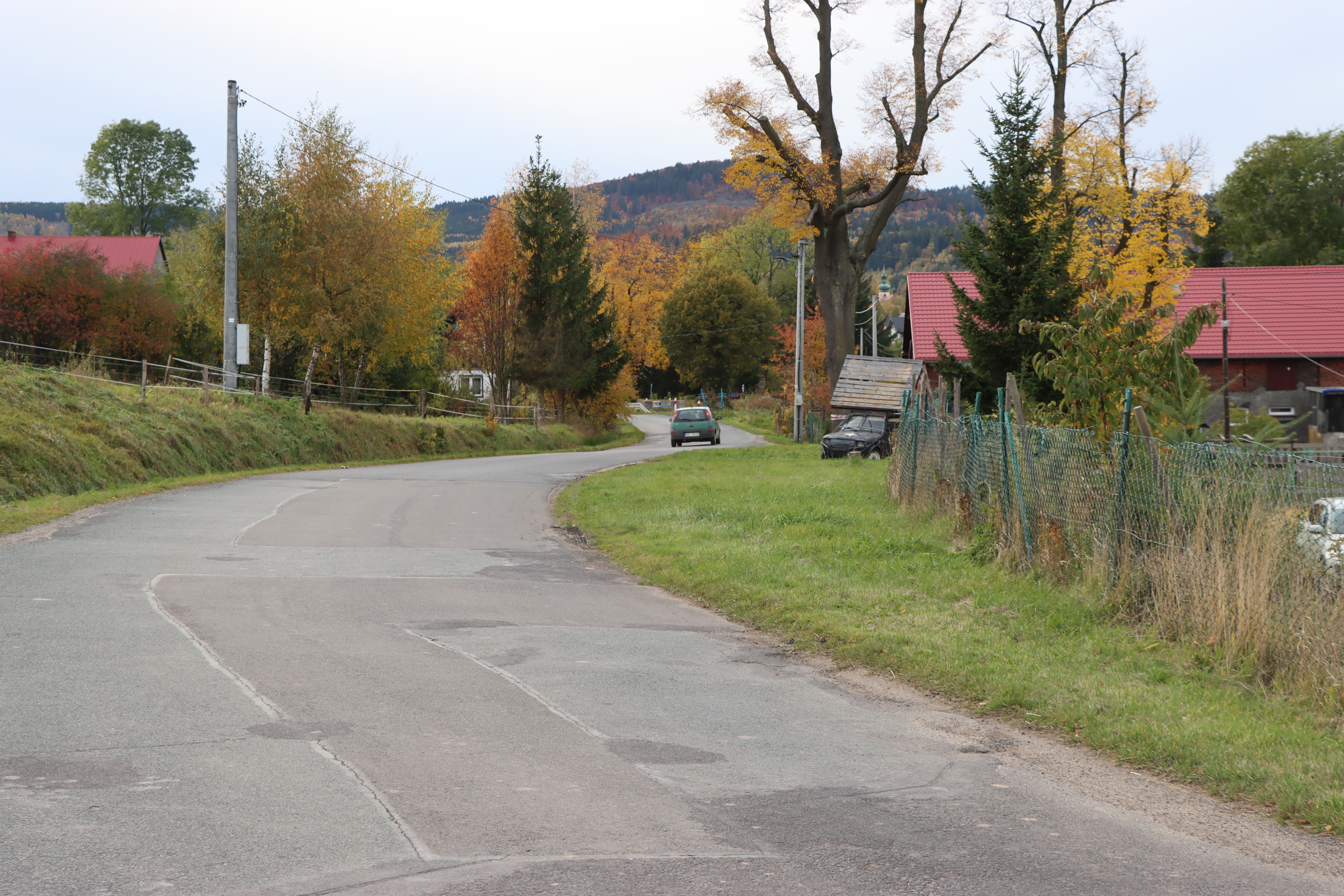
Main road

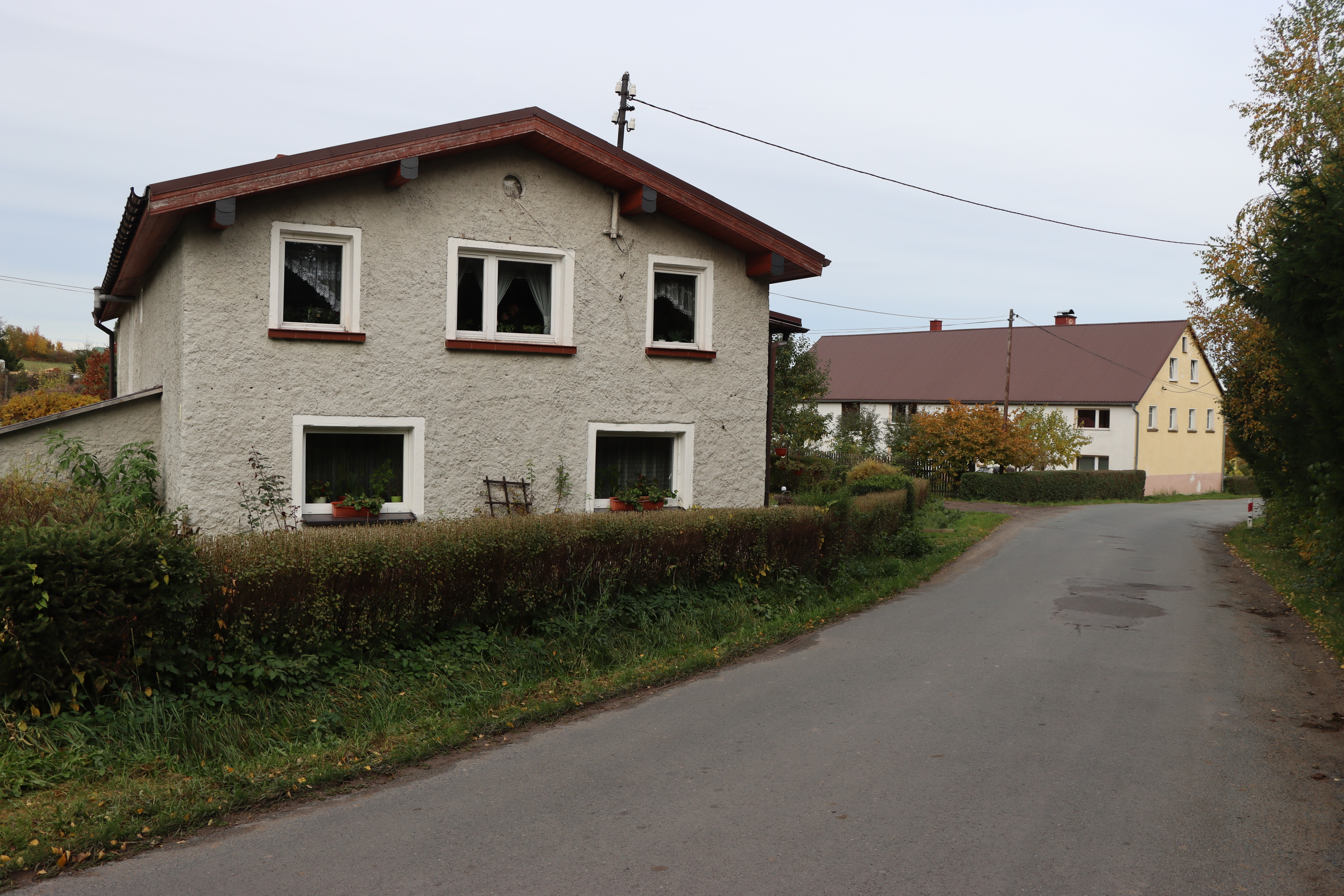
Houses by the road

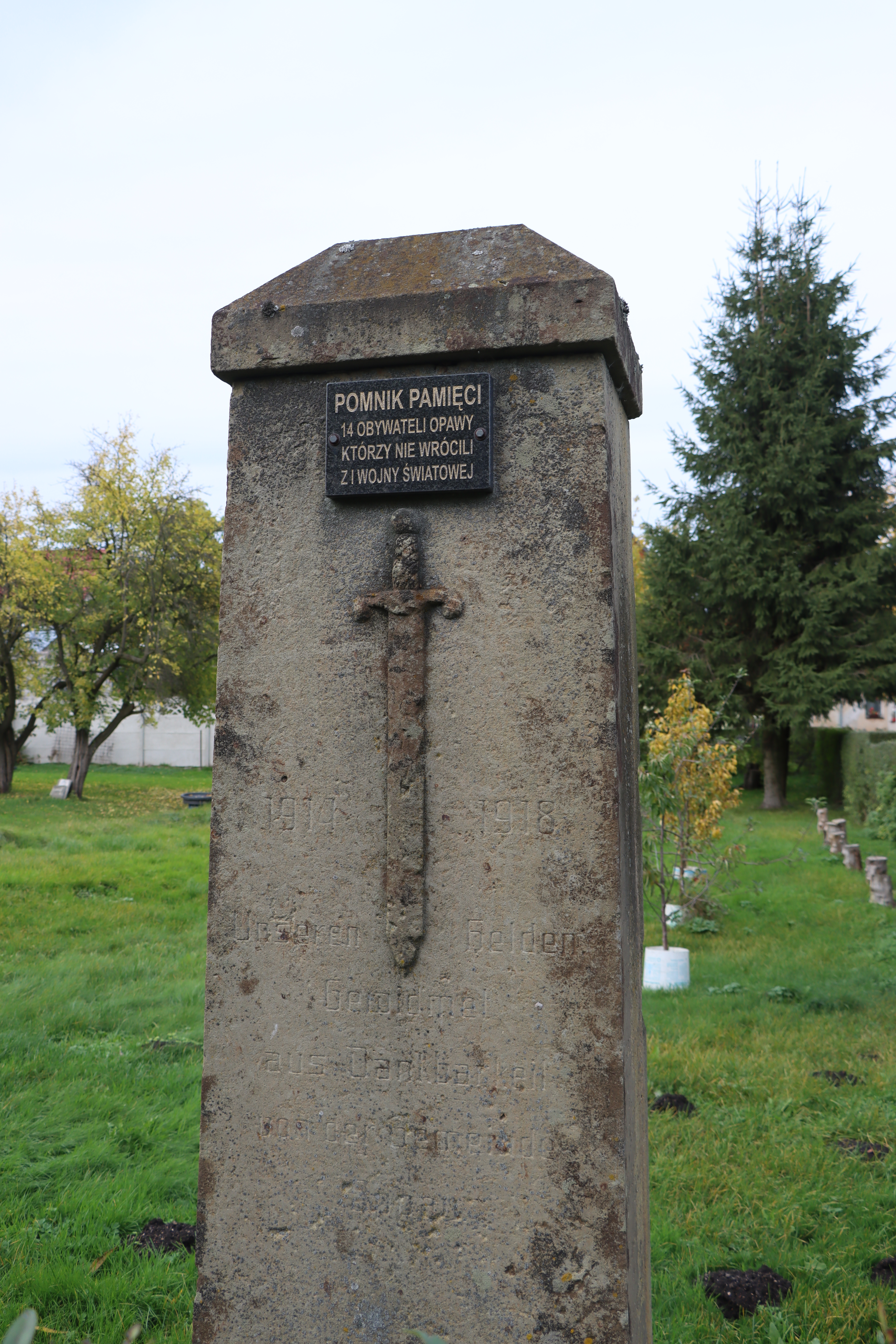
World War I memorial

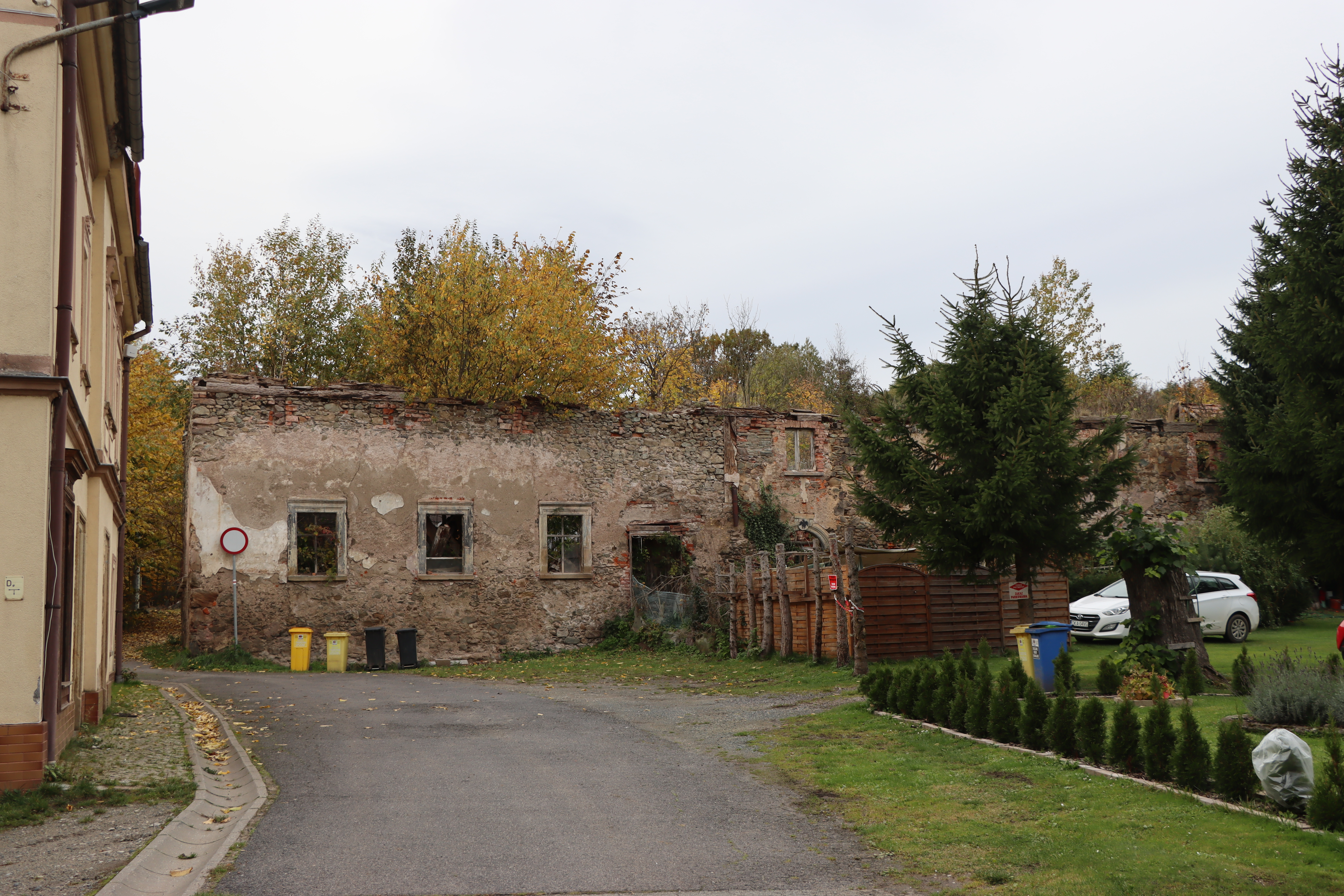
Ruin of the manor
