= Opawa River Bridge =

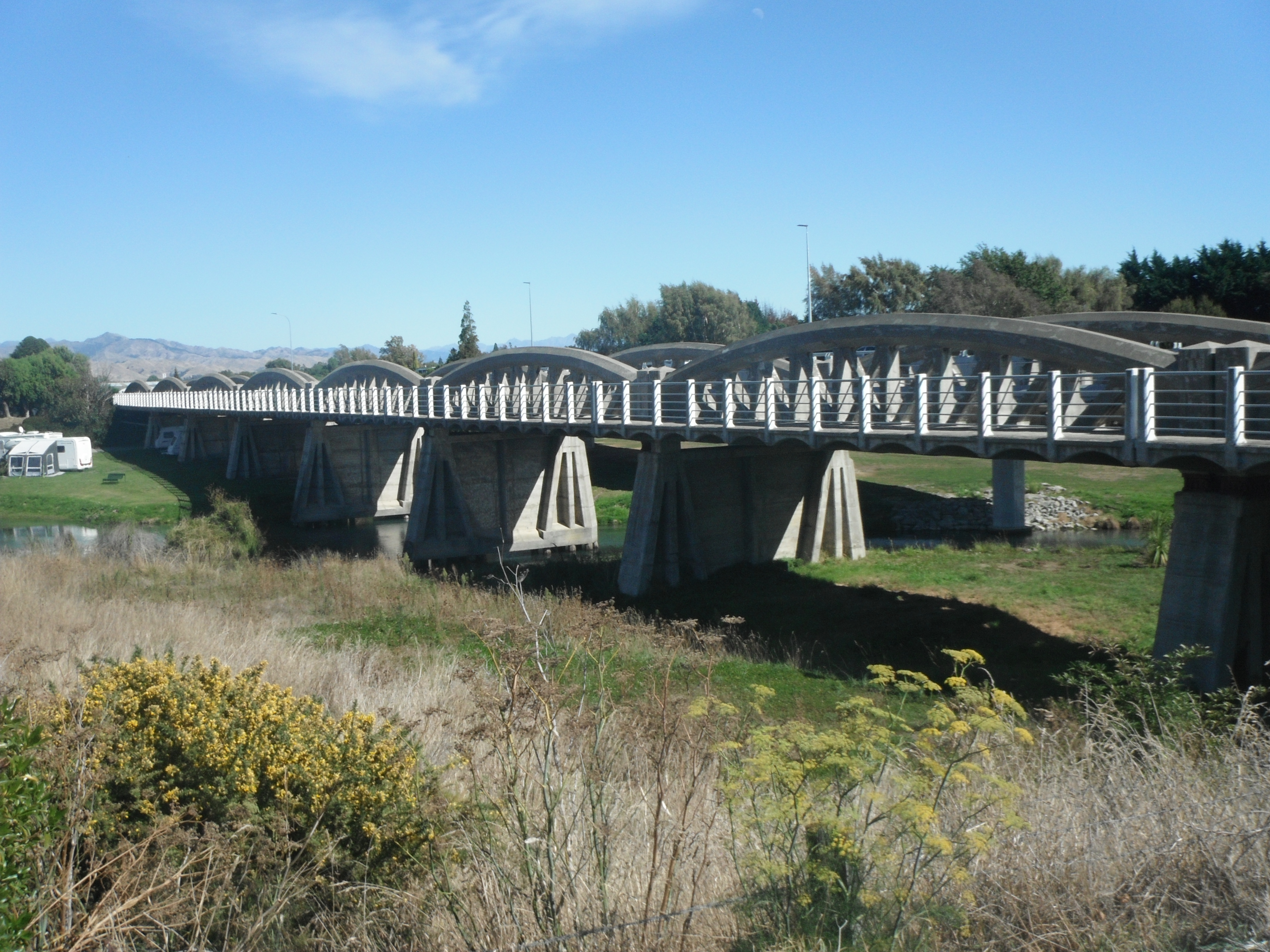
- Opawa River Bridge in April 2021
- Coordinates: 41.497007°S 173.961961°E
- Crosses: Opawa River
- Locale: Blenheim, New Zealand

History
- Construction start: 1869
- Opened: 1917

Heritage New Zealand – Category 1
- Designated: 28 June 1990
- Reference no.: 241

The Opawa River Bridge is a reinforced concrete bowstring truss bridge in Blenheim, New Zealand that crosses the Ōpaoa River. The bridge is classified as a "Category I" ("places of special or outstanding historical or cultural heritage significance or value") historic place by the Heritage New Zealand, formerly known as New Zealand Historic Places Trust. The bridge was first built in 1869 but collapsed in 1878. A new bridge was not completed until the end of 1917.

Between 1917 and 2020, Grove Road (part of State Highway 1) used the Opawa River bridge. In January 2016, the Government approved the construction of a new bridge just upstream (west) of the existing bridge. The new bridge opened to traffic in July 2020, with the existing bridge remaining open for cyclists and pedestrians.
