= Mount Maori =

Mountain in Otago, New Zealand

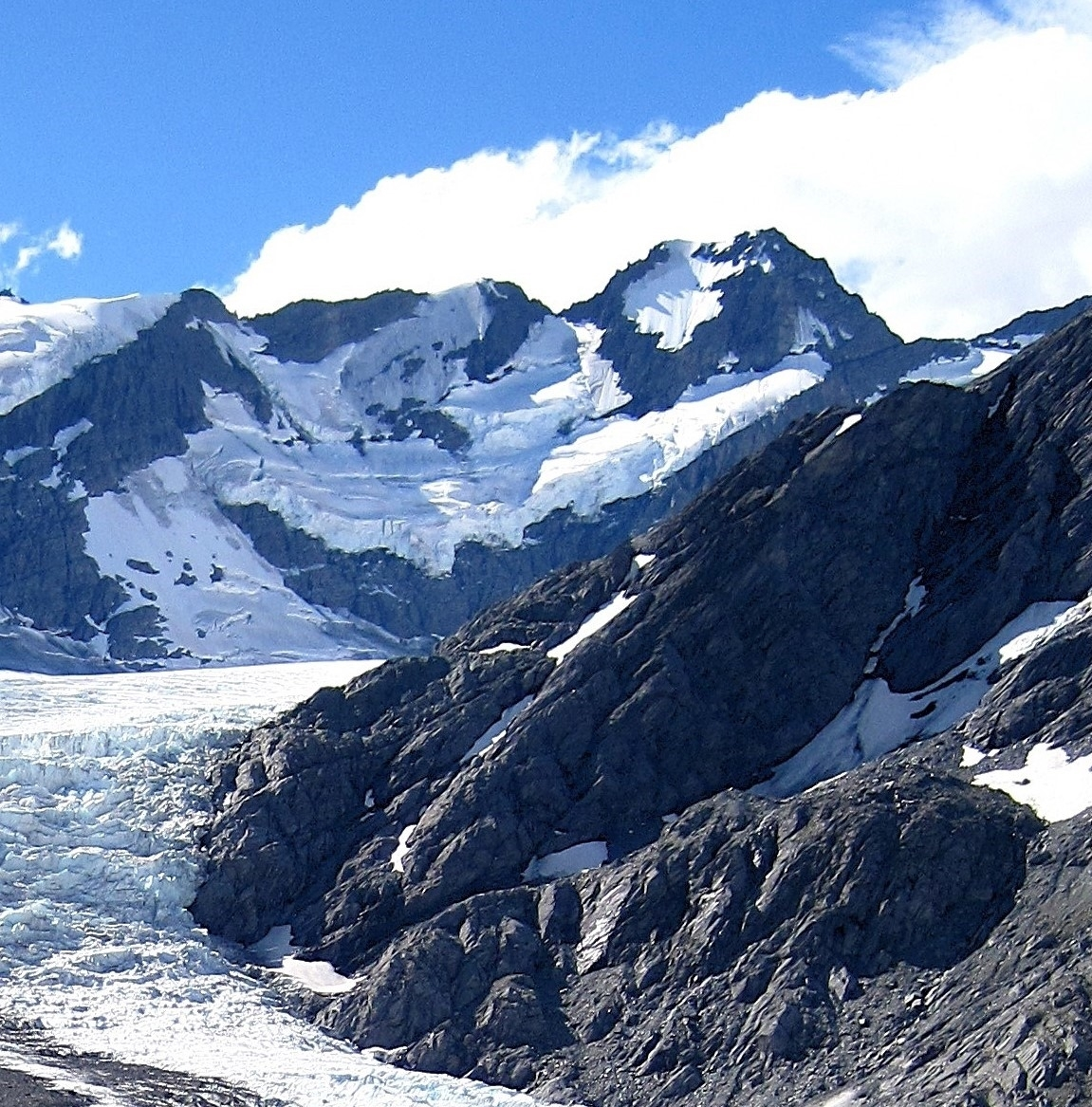
- South aspect

Highest point
- Elevation: 2,535 m (8,317 ft)
- Prominence: 309 m (1,014 ft)
- Isolation: 2.96 km (1.84 mi)
- Listing: New Zealand #63
- Coordinates: 44.435971°S 168.610547°E

Naming
- Etymology: Māori

Geography
- Location within New Zealand
- Interactive map of Mount Maori
- Location: South Island
- Country: New Zealand
- Region: West Coast / Otago
- Protected area: Mount Aspiring National Park
- Parent range: Southern Alps; Snowdrift Range
- Topo map(s): NZMS260 E39; Topo50 CA10

Geology
- Rock type: Metamorphic rock (pelitic schist)

Climbing
- First ascent: March 1935

Mount Maori is a 2,535-metre-elevation (8,317-foot) mountain in the South Island of New Zealand.

== Description ==
Mount Maori is located 10 kilometres southwest of Mount Aspiring / Tititea on the crest or Main Divide of the Southern Alps. The summit is set on the boundary shared by the Otago and West Coast Regions of the South Island. It is also within Mount Aspiring National Park which is part of the Te Wahipounamu UNESCO World Heritage Site. Precipitation runoff from the mountain's north slope drains into the Arawhata River, whereas the south slope drains into the headwaters of the Dart River / Te Awa Whakatipu. Topographic relief is significant as the summit rises 1,735 metres (5,692 feet) above the Arawhata Valley in 2.5 kilometres. The nearest higher neighbour is Mount Edward, four kilometres to the south-southwest. The first ascent of the summit was made on 5 March 1935 by Russell Edwards, Gordon Edwards, Ernie Smith, and Doug Knowles.

== Climate ==
Based on the Köppen climate classification, Mount Maori is located in a marine west coast climate zone, with a subpolar oceanic climate (Cfc) at the summit. Prevailing westerly winds blow moist air from the Tasman Sea onto the mountain, where the air is forced upwards by the mountains (orographic lift), causing moisture to drop in the form of rain and snow. This climate supports the Dart and Pench glaciers on the south slope, along with an unnamed glacier on the north slope. The months of December through February offer the most favourable weather for viewing or climbing this peak.

== Climbing ==
Climbing routes with the first ascents:

- East Ridge – Russell Edwards, Gordon Edwards, Ernie Smith, Doug Knowles – 1935
- Via Snow White Glacier – Les and Doug Brough, Lindsay Bruce, Alex Gourlay – 1959
- South Face – Allan Uren, Phil Penney – 1987
- Via Whitbourn Saddle – FA unknown

== See also ==
- List of mountains of New Zealand by height

== Gallery ==
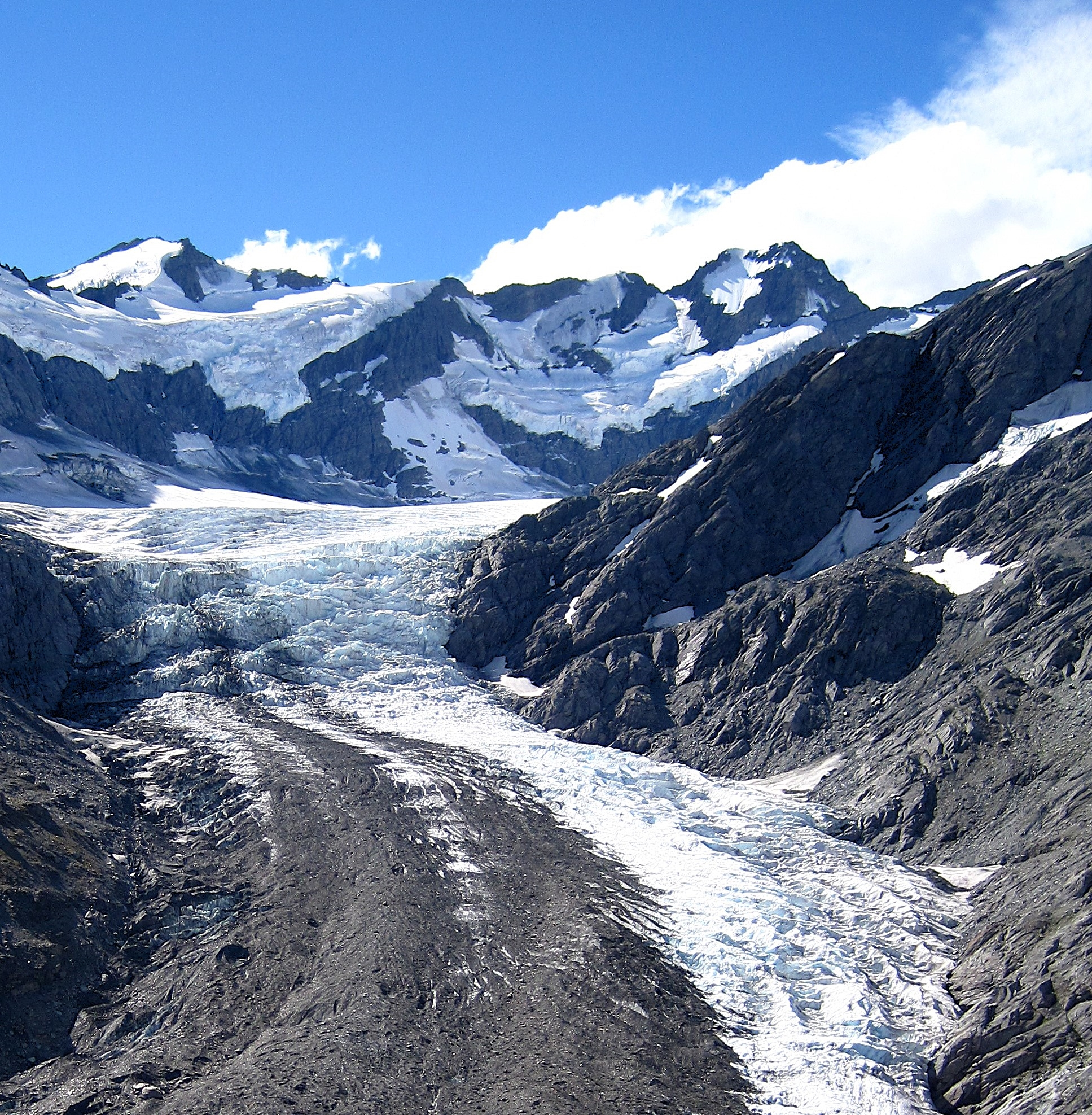
South aspect, upper right above Dart Glacier

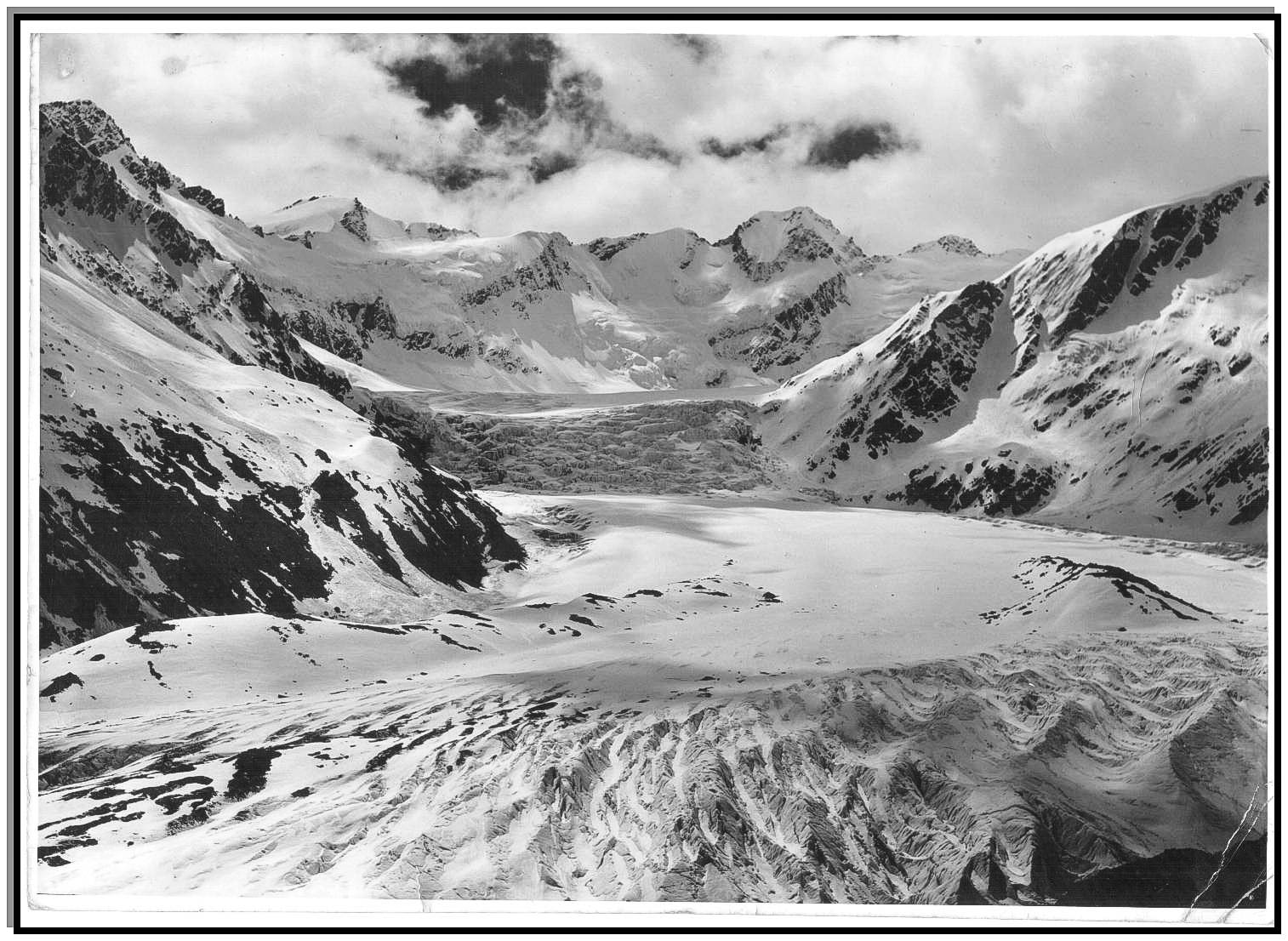
Mount Maori right of centre, with Mount Maruiwi to left

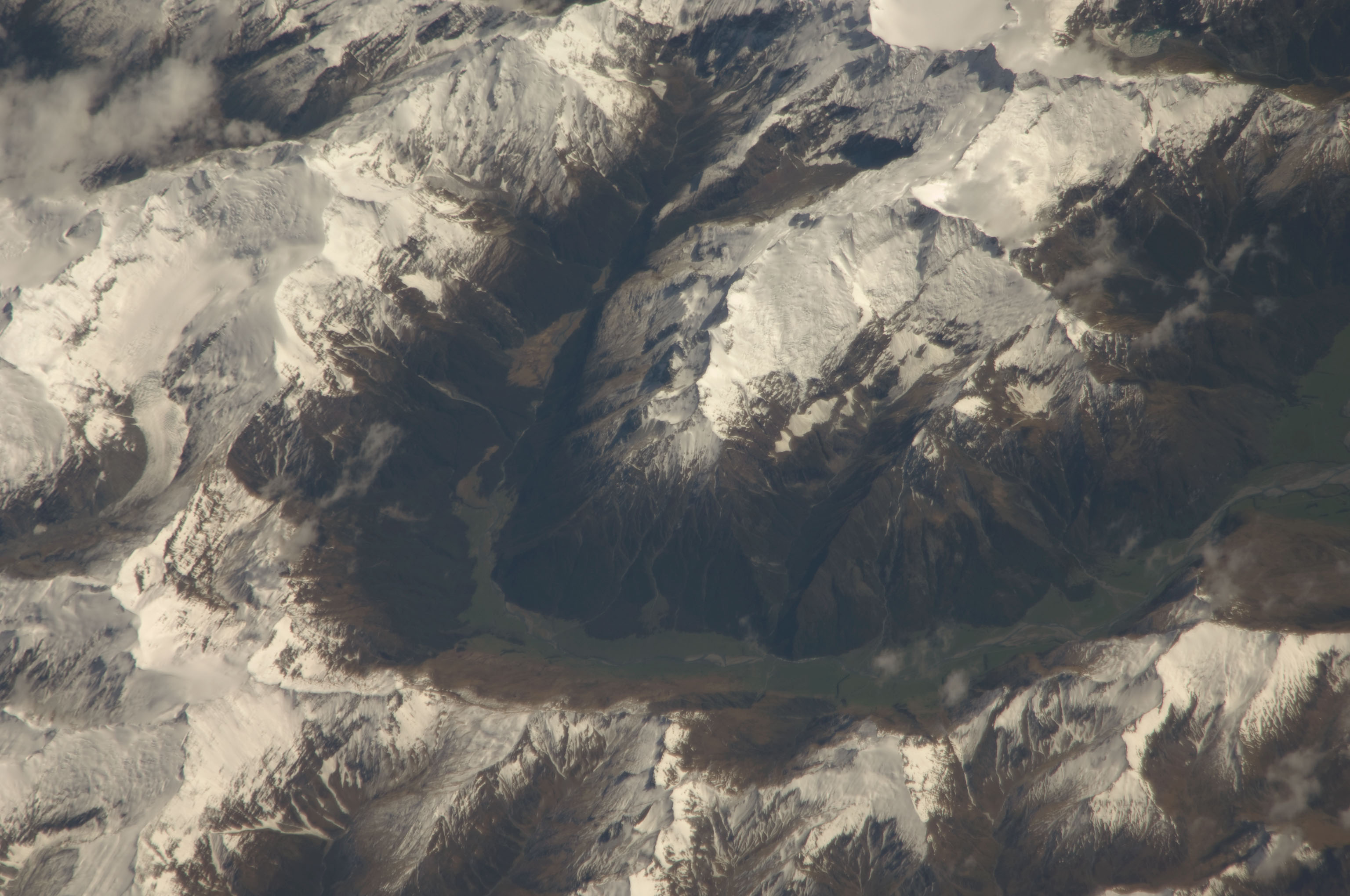
View from space, Mount Maori in upper left
