= Rees and Dart Tracks =

Hiking trails in South Island, New Zealand

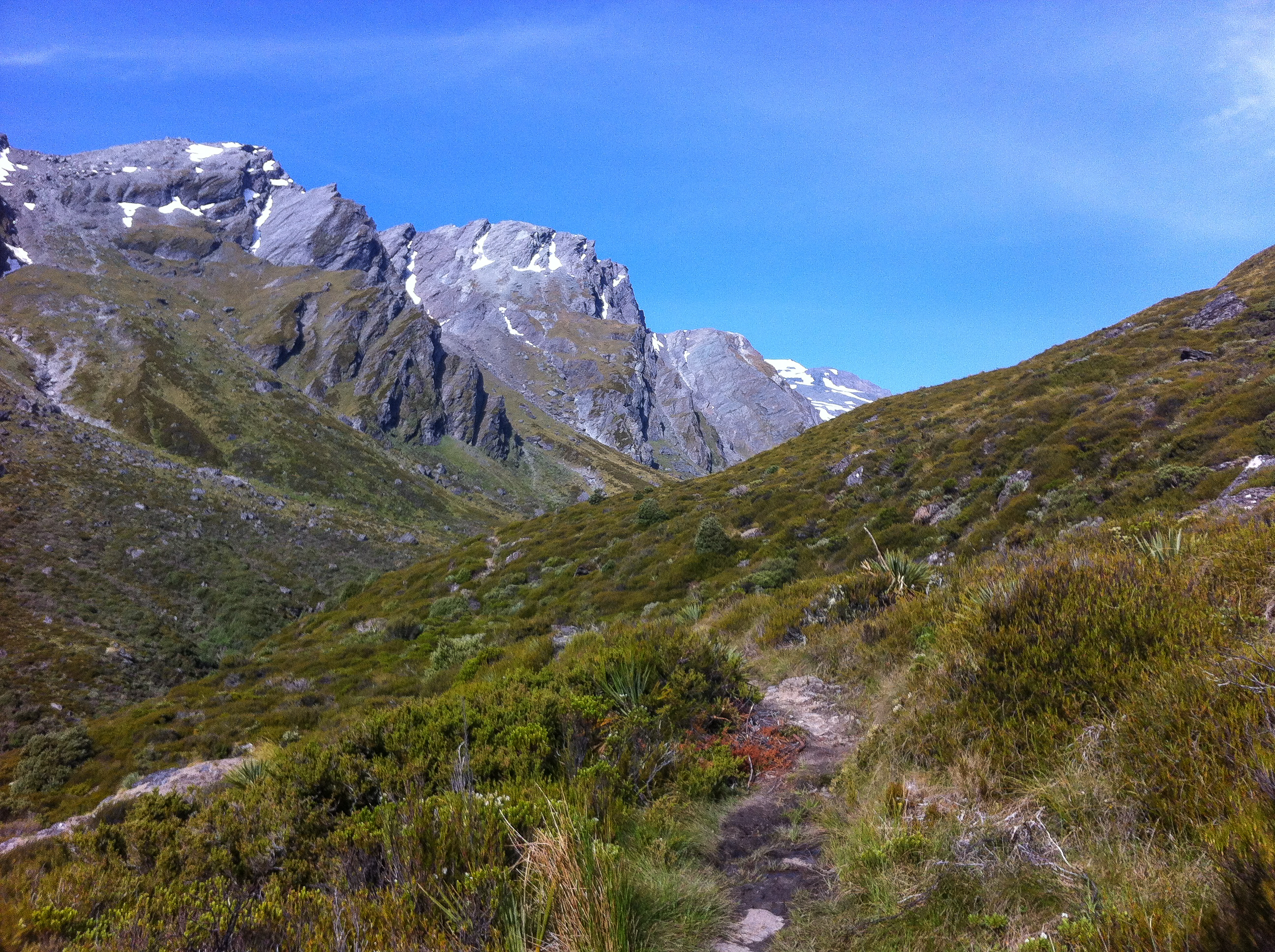
- Rees Track
- Length: 63 km (39 mi)
- Location: Mount Aspiring National Park, New Zealand
- Trailheads: Chinamans Bluff, Muddy Creek carpark
- Use: Tramping, trail running
- Highest point: 1,471 m (4,826 ft), Rees Saddle
- Lowest point: Chinamans Bluff carpark, 400 m (1,300 ft)
- Difficulty: medium
- Season: Spring to Autumn (open all year)
- Months: late October to mid April
- Sights: Alpine views, lakes, forests, tussocklands, rivers
- Hazards: Hypothermia, high winds, rocks, roots, snow, rain, avalanche
- Surface: dirt, rock, roots
- Website: www.doc.govt.nz/parks-and-recreation/places-to-go/otago/places/mount-aspiring-national-park/things-to-do/tracks/rees-dart-track

The Rees and Dart Tracks form a tramping (hiking) 63 kilometres (39 mi) circuit which is located in the South Island of New Zealand. The trailheads are far apart requiring transport planning in order to tramp or run the track. The track allows access to the Cascade Saddle Track in which one can see the Dart Glacier and allows access to the Matukituki Valley.

Access to the Dart Track is via the Chinamans Bluff carpark and which is near the Dart River while access to the Rees Track is via the Muddy Creek carpark near the Rees River.

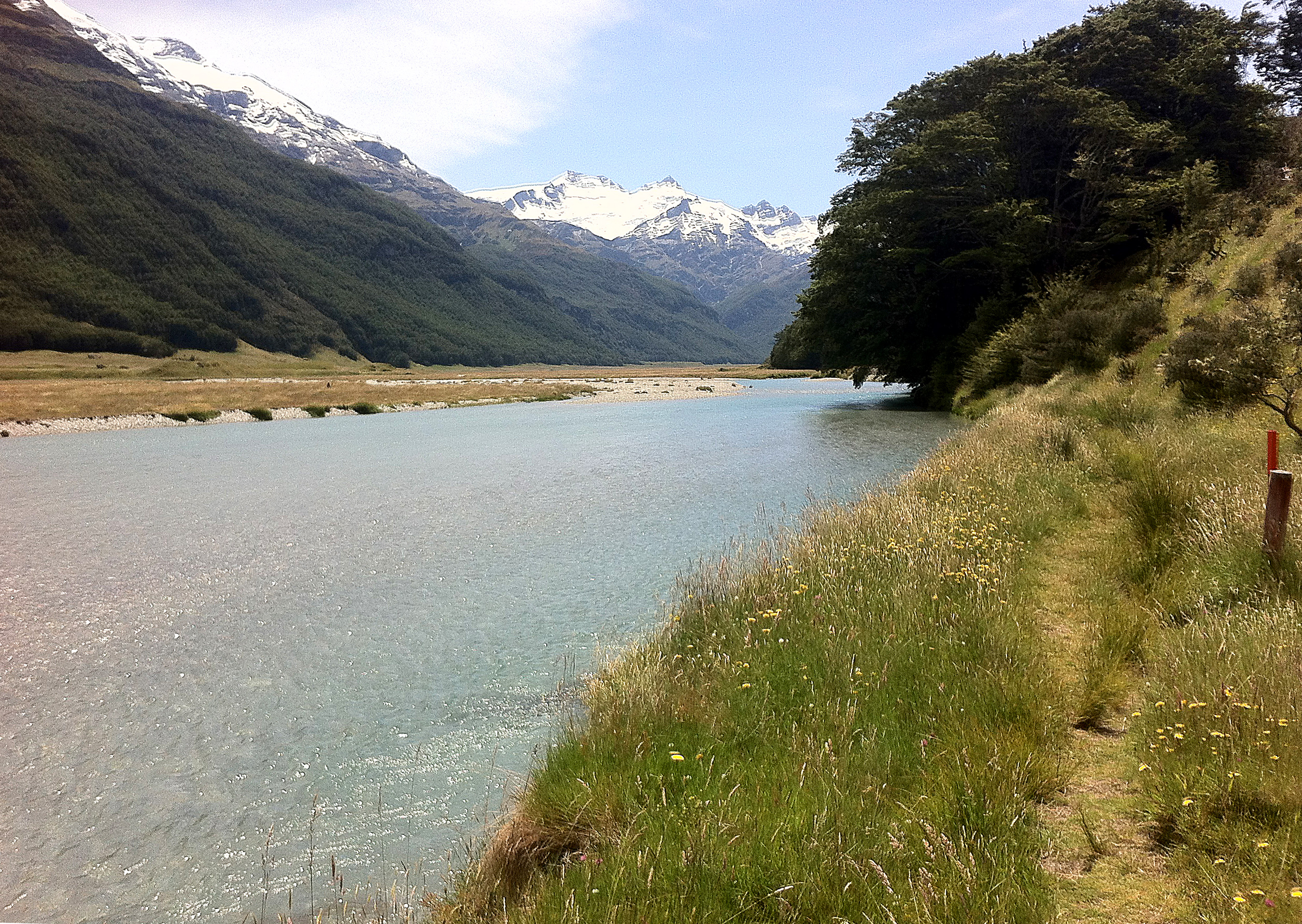
Rees River track

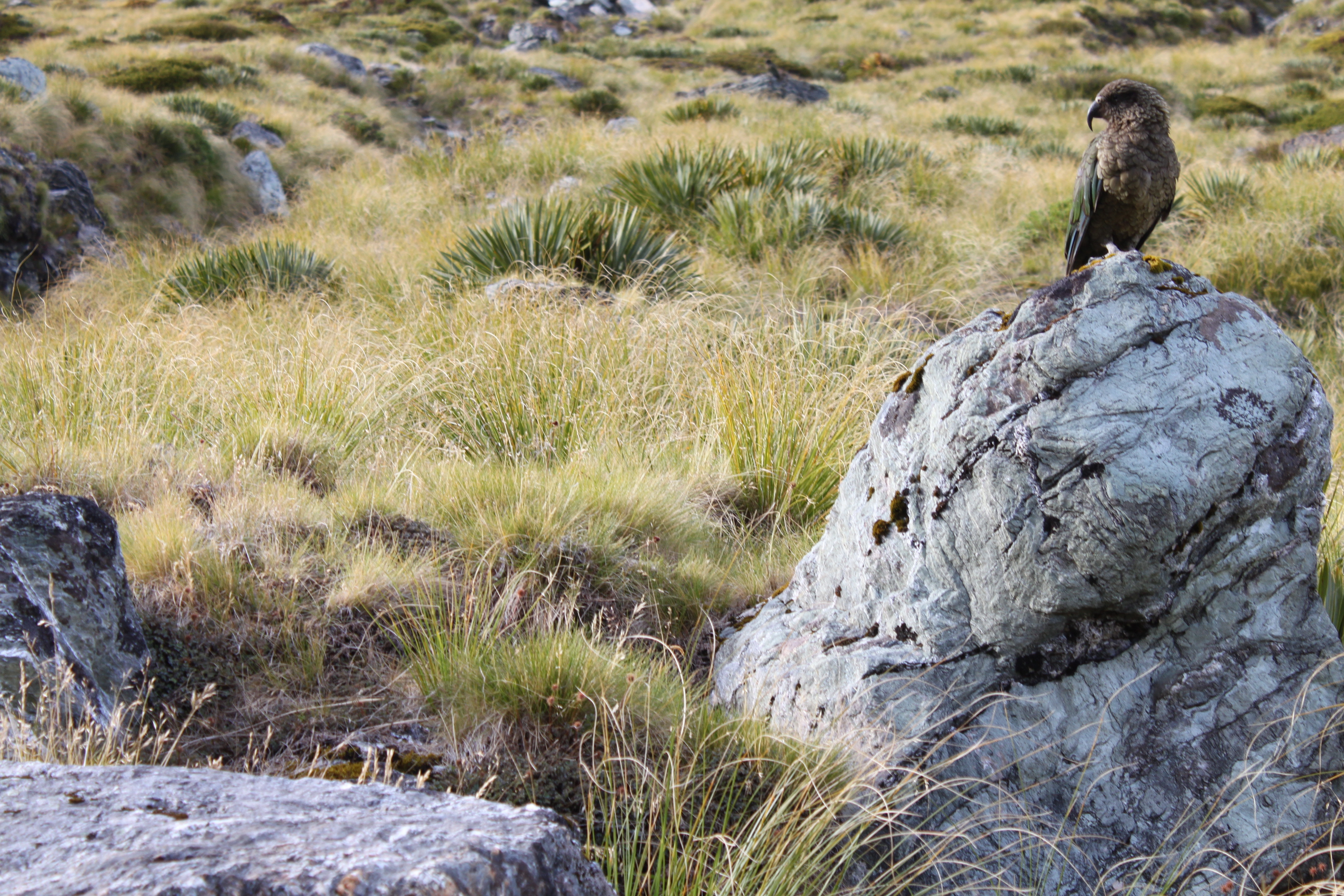
Kea on the Dart Track

== History ==
In 2014 a large slip blocked the Dart River and caused a large lake to form. Many sections of the track were destroyed or underwater. In 2017 after three years a new section of the Dart Track was opened that was higher up than the original.
