= Cascade Saddle Track =

Tramping track in Otago, New Zealand

Coordinates: 44°28′40″S 168°39′38″E

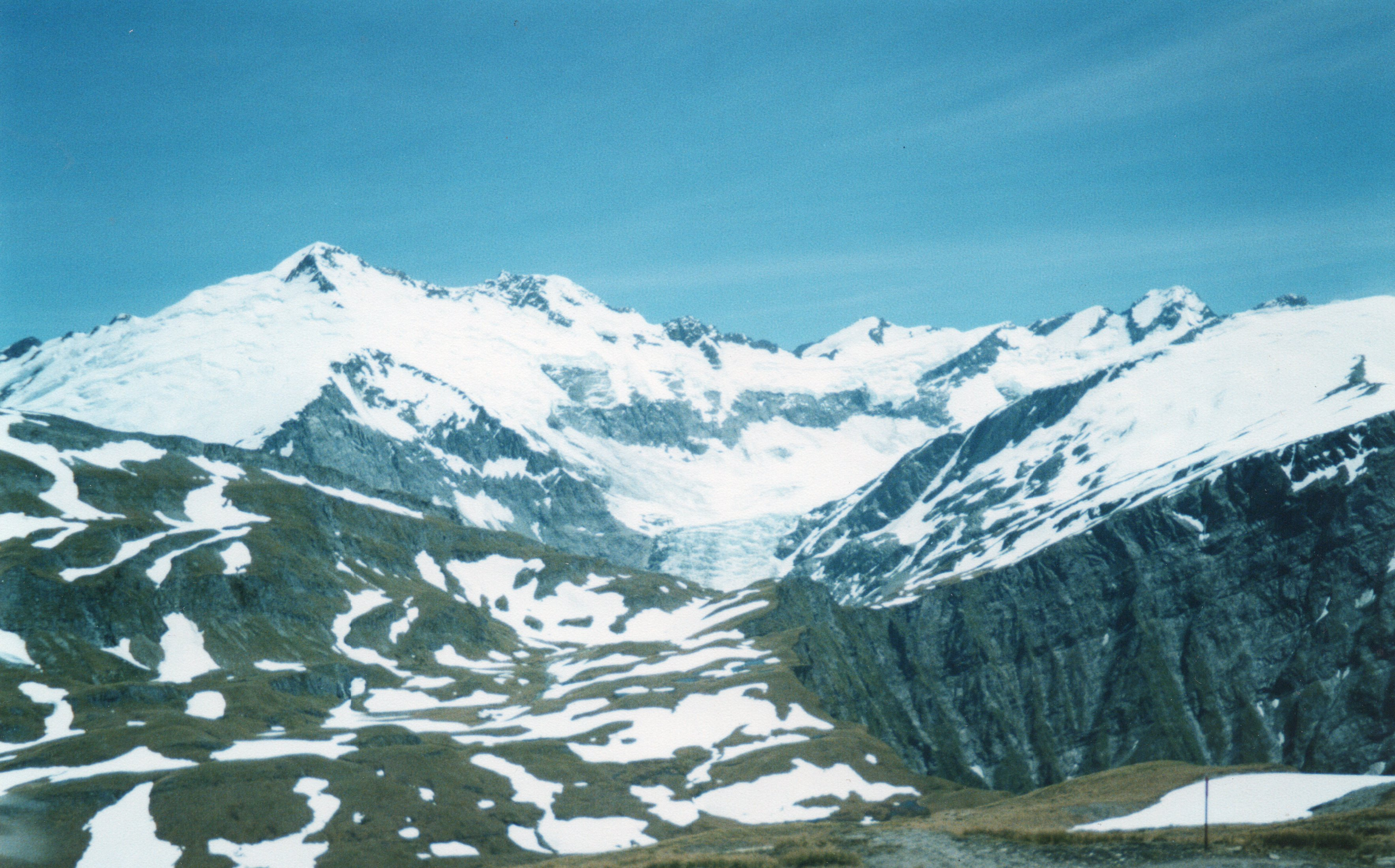
- View of the Cascade Saddle from the Cascade Saddle Tramping Track
- Length: 25 km (16 mi)
- Location: Matukituki Valley, Mount Aspiring National Park, Otago, New Zealand
- Use: Tramping
- Difficulty: Expert
- Sights: Alpine views; glaciers; cliffs
- Hazards: Avalanche; falls; rivers
- Website: Cascade Saddle Track

The Cascade Saddle Track, also known as the Cascade Saddle Route, is a 25 km (16 mi) alpine tramping track in the Mount Aspiring National Park, New Zealand that takes approximately four days to complete. It is known for its "spectacular" views but is considered an expert-level track due to the hazardous conditions.

== Description ==
The route is typically undertaken from east to west and links the Matukituki Valley with the Dart River valley. The start of the track is accessed from Wānaka and the end of the track links with the Rees and Dart Tracks, with the exit towards Queenstown. Accommodations are available along the route in the Aspiring Hut and in the Dart Hut. There is a steep scrambling climb from Aspiring Hut towards the Cascade Saddle itself, reaching a maximum elevation of 1,835 m (6,020 ft). The views of Matukituki Valley from the saddle have been reported as "spectacular". The route then follows the left bank of the Dart River and includes views of the Dart Glacier.

The tramping route has been highlighted as one of the most dangerous, both in New Zealand and worldwide, due to the hazardous alpine nature of the track. The route is maintained by the Department of Conservation, who recommend it is best attempted by experienced trampers. A 2014 proposal to install safety rails was not adopted, partly so as not to encourage attempts by less-experienced hikers.

== Incidents ==
In 2005 an Irish doctor, Donal Deery, lost his life on the Cascade Saddle in a 250 m (820 ft) fall to save the life of his partner. In 2012, a senior software engineer employed by Google, Frank Spychalski, died on the Cascade Saddle route after falling 200 m (660 ft). There have been a number of other fatalities reported, with at least 10 lives lost over several decades.
