= Glenorchy, New Zealand =

Glenorchy
- Town
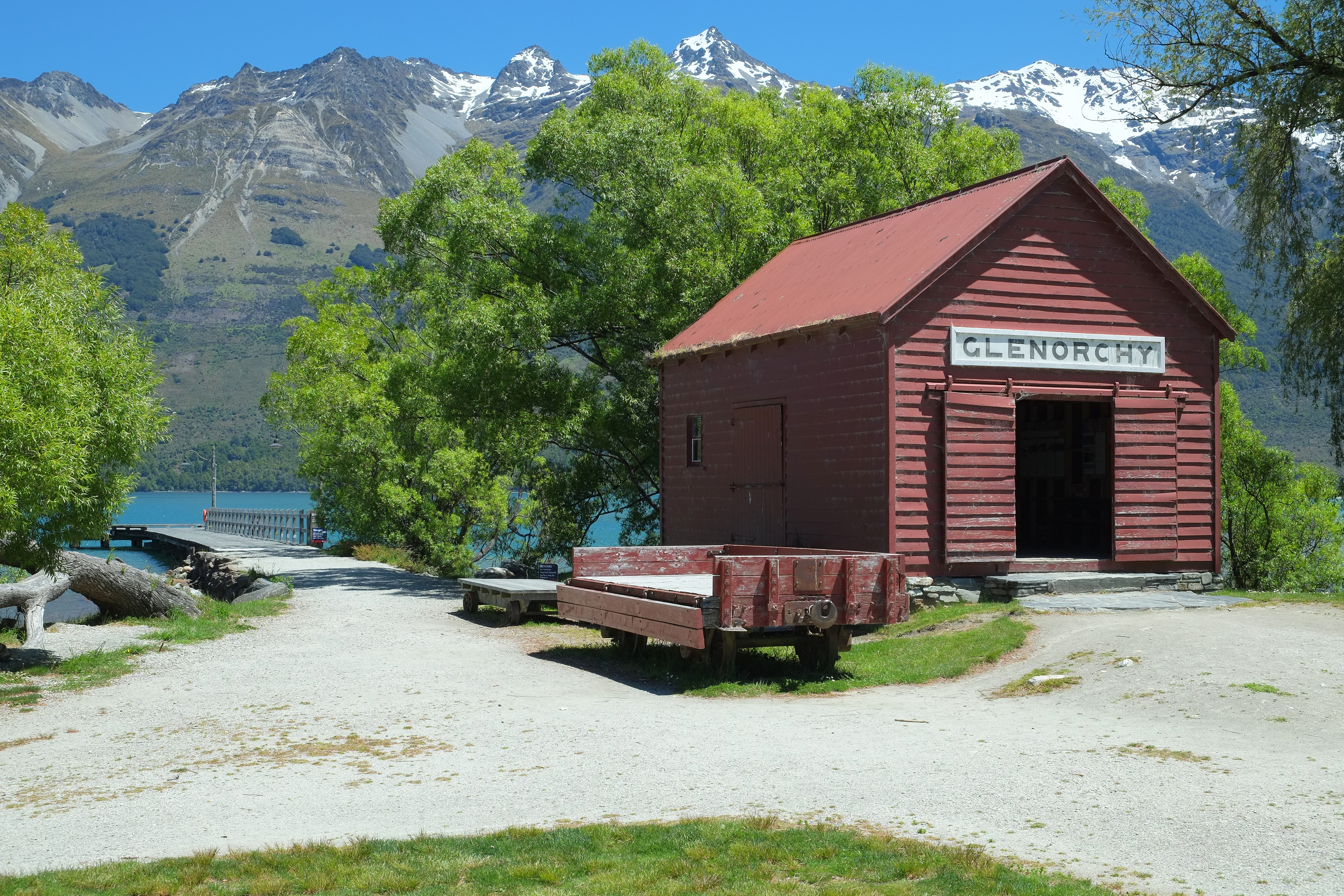
- Boatshed near wharf
- Interactive map of Glenorchy
- Coordinates: 44°51′01″S 168°23′18″E
- Country: New Zealand
- Region: Otago
- Territorial authority: Queenstown Lakes District
- Ward: Queenstown-Wakatipu Ward
- Surveyed: 1864
- Electorates: Southland; Te Tai Tonga (Māori)

Government
  - Territorial authority: Queenstown-Lakes District Council
  - Regional council: Otago Regional Council
  - Mayor of Queenstown-Lakes: John Glover
  - Southland MP: Joseph Mooney
  - Te Tai Tonga MP: Tākuta Ferris

Area
  - Total: 3.93 km^{2} (1.52 sq mi)

Population (June 2025)
  - Total: 360
  - Density: 92/km^{2} (240/sq mi)
- Time zone: UTC+12 (NZST)
  - Summer (DST): UTC+13 (NZDT)
- Postcode: 9372
- Area code: 03
- Local iwi: Ngāi Tahu

Glenorchy is a small settlement at the northern end of Lake Wakatipu in the South Island region of Otago, New Zealand. It is approximately 45 km (28 mi) by road or boat from Queenstown, the nearest large town. There are two pubs, a café and a range of small shops in the town catering mainly to tourists but also to the small resident population. There is also a small airstrip which caters to small planes.

The locality of Paradise is nearby.

The Dart River / Te Awa Whakatipu and Rees River flow into the head of Lake Wakatipu at Glenorchy, and Blanket Bay, an indentation in the coast of Lake Wakatipu, is just to the south of the settlement.

== Naming ==
Glenorchy was named after Glen Orchy, a valley in Argyll, Scotland.

== Demographics ==
Glenorchy is described by Statistics New Zealand as a rural settlement. It covers 3.93 km^{2} (1.52 sq mi) and had an estimated population of 360 as of June 2025, with a population density of 92 people per km^{2}. It is part of the much larger Glenorchy statistical area.

Historical population of Glenorchy settlement
Year	Pop.	±% p.a.
2006	192	—
2013	261	+4.48%
2018	318	+4.03%

Glenorchy settlement had a population of 318 at the 2018 New Zealand census, an increase of 57 people (21.8%) since the 2013 census, and an increase of 126 people (65.6%) since the 2006 census. There were 129 households, comprising 159 males and 159 females, giving a sex ratio of 1.0 males per female, with 39 people (12.3%) aged under 15 years, 63 (19.8%) aged 15 to 29, 183 (57.5%) aged 30 to 64, and 33 (10.4%) aged 65 or older.

Ethnicities were 91.5% European/Pākehā, 6.6% Māori, 1.9% Pasifika, 3.8% Asian, and 3.8% other ethnicities. People may identify with more than one ethnicity.

Although some people chose not to answer the census's question about religious affiliation, 69.8% had no religion, 21.7% were Christian, 0.9% were Buddhist and 2.8% had other religions.

Of those at least 15 years old, 75 (26.9%) people had a bachelor's or higher degree, and 27 (9.7%) people had no formal qualifications. 36 people (12.9%) earned over $70,000 compared to 17.2% nationally. The employment status of those at least 15 was that 198 (71.0%) people were employed full-time, 36 (12.9%) were part-time, and 6 (2.2%) were unemployed.

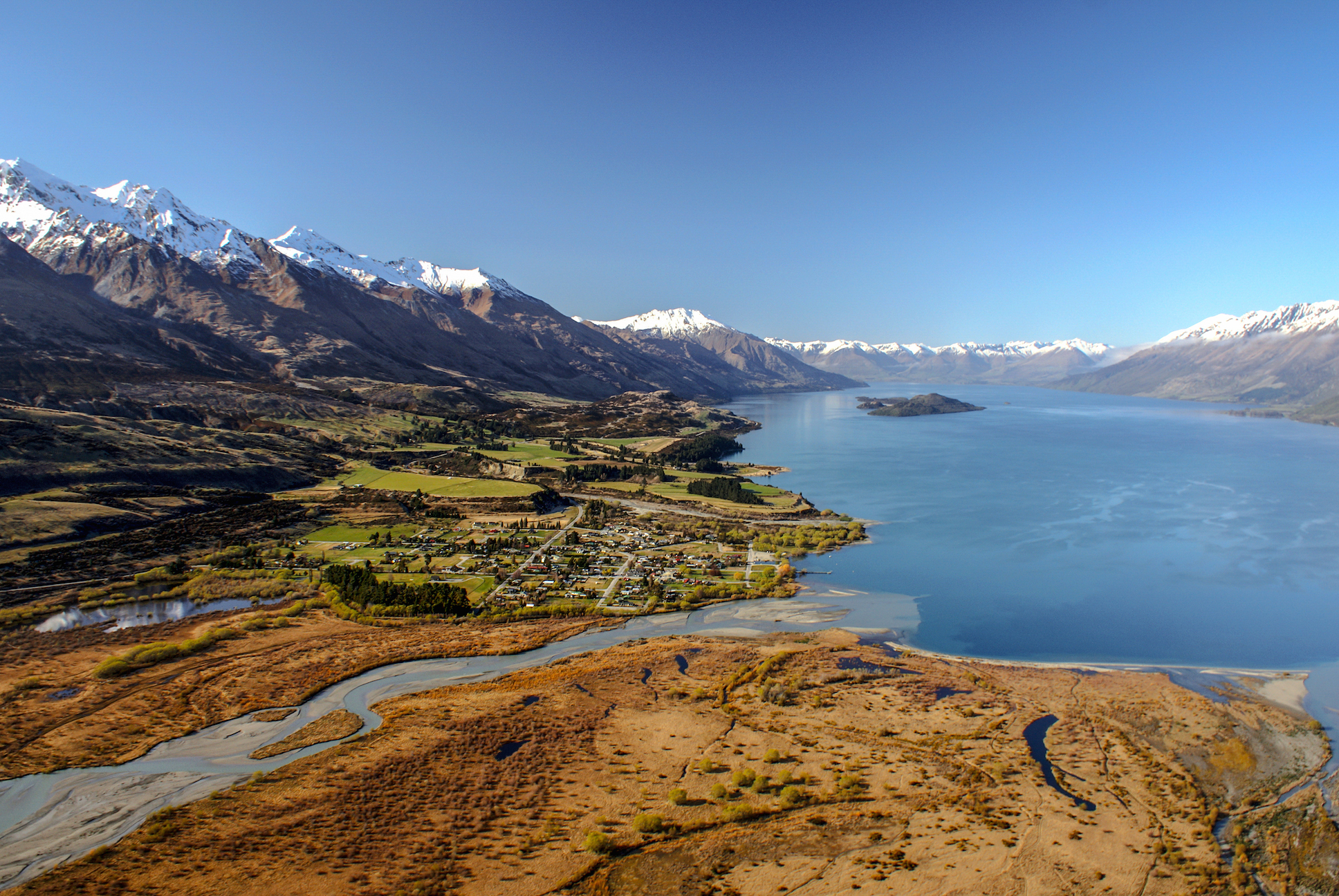
The head of Lake Wakatipu, Glenorchy

=== Glenorchy statistical area ===
The Glenorchy statistical area also includes Paradise and covers 1,464.37 km^{2} (565.40 sq mi). It had an estimated population of 520 as of June 2025, with a population density of 0.36 people per km^{2}.

Historical population of the statistical area
Year	Pop.	±% p.a.
2006	273	—
2013	363	+4.15%
2018	450	+4.39%

The statistical area had a population of 450 at the 2018 New Zealand census, an increase of 87 people (24.0%) since the 2013 census, and an increase of 177 people (64.8%) since the 2006 census. There were 177 households, comprising 222 males and 225 females, giving a sex ratio of 0.99 males per female. The median age was 40.2 years (compared with 37.4 years nationally), with 51 people (11.3%) aged under 15 years, 84 (18.7%) aged 15 to 29, 261 (58.0%) aged 30 to 64, and 48 (10.7%) aged 65 or older.

Ethnicities were 92.0% European/Pākehā, 5.3% Māori, 2.0% Pasifika, 3.3% Asian, and 3.3% other ethnicities. People may identify with more than one ethnicity.

The percentage of people born overseas was 35.3, compared with 27.1% nationally.

Although some people chose not to answer the census's question about religious affiliation, 66.7% had no religion, 24.7% were Christian, 1.3% were Buddhist and 2.0% had other religions.

Of those at least 15 years old, 105 (26.3%) people had a bachelor's or higher degree, and 36 (9.0%) people had no formal qualifications. The median income was $38,000, compared with $31,800 nationally. 69 people (17.3%) earned over $70,000 compared to 17.2% nationally. The employment status of those at least 15 was that 276 (69.2%) people were employed full-time, 60 (15.0%) were part-time, and 6 (1.5%) were unemployed.

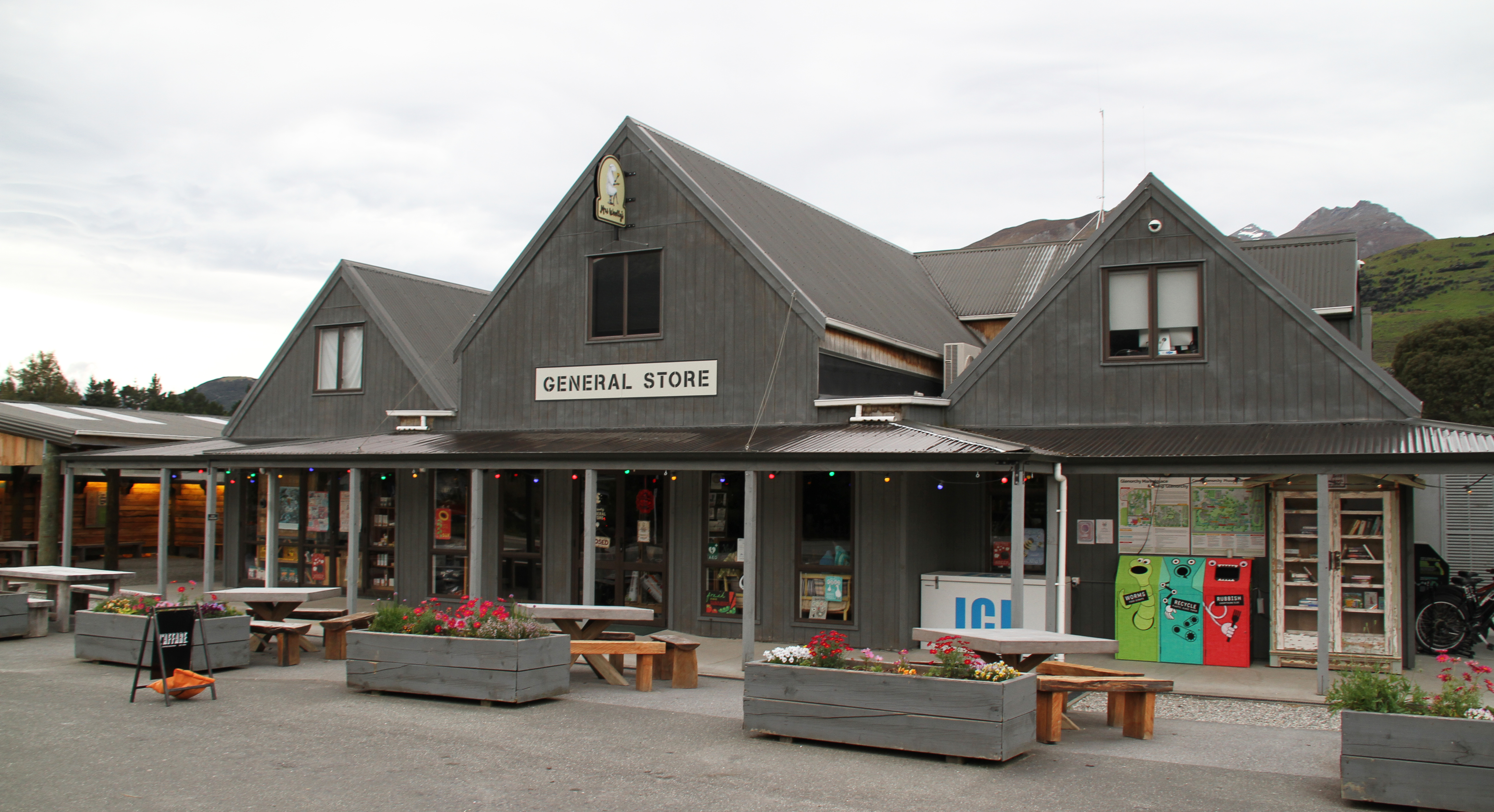
General store

== Activities ==
Glenorchy is a popular tourist spot, close to many tramping tracks. It lies near the borders of Mount Aspiring National Park and Fiordland National Park. The Routeburn Track, one of the New Zealand Great Walks can be accessed by passing through Glenorchy. Lesser known tracks such as the Greenstone and Caples Tracks and the Rees and Dart Tracks can also be accessed.

Some of the activities that can be experienced in or near Glenorchy include: canyoning, fly fishing, jet boating, horse riding, kayaking, mountain biking, skiing, snowboarding, skydiving and boating. Just past the Glenorchy Golf Club is a circular public boardwalk which passes through the Glenorchy Lagoon and is a popular short walk (3.2 km) for tourists and locals.

== Dark sky sanctuary ==
On 25 February 2025, DarkSky International announced the certification of the Tāhuna Glenorchy Dark Sky Sanctuary. This was the culmination of five years of work by a team within the Glenorchy Heritage and Museum Group. One of the attractions of the sanctuary is that it is amongst the few places on land where the core of the Milky Way can be seen, but the Aurora Australis can also be seen.

== Film location ==
=== Films ===
- The local scenery was used as one of the settings in the first of Peter Jackson's The Fellowship of the Ring (2001), the first film in his Lord of the Rings series. Lothlórien, Orthanc, and the scene where Boromir was slain and leant near a tree were a few that were shot in nearby Paradise.
- Vertical Limit (2000), The Chronicles of Narnia: Prince Caspian (2008), and X-Men Origins: Wolverine (2009) were also filmed in the area.
- Other films that did location shots in Glenorchy and the surrounding area are Race for the Yankee Zephyr (1981) and The Water Horse (2007).

=== Television ===
- The 2013 BBC television miniseries Top of the Lake was also filmed in the area and was set in and around Paradise. While Queenstown is referred to during the series, Glenorchy doubles as the fictitious town of Laketop.

== Education ==
Glenorchy School is a co-educational state primary school for Year 1 to 8 students, with a roll of 29 as of July 2026. The first school in the area opened in 1884 at Kinloch, and another opened in 1888 on the road to Paradise. The present school opened near Buckleburn in 1911, and moved to its current site in 1939.

== Climate ==
Climate data for Glenorchy, elevation 311 m (1,020 ft), (1951–1981)
Month	Jan	Feb	Mar	Apr	May	Jun	Jul	Aug	Sep	Oct	Nov	Dec	Year
Average rainfall mm (inches)	91 (3.6)	76 (3.0)	105 (4.1)	102 (4.0)	112 (4.4)	96 (3.8)	82 (3.2)	91 (3.6)	116 (4.6)	114 (4.5)	102 (4.0)	98 (3.9)	1,185 (46.7)
Source: NIWA

Climate data for Mount Larkins, elevation 1,900 m (6,200 ft), (1991–2020 normals, extremes 2013–present)
Month	Jan	Feb	Mar	Apr	May	Jun	Jul	Aug	Sep	Oct	Nov	Dec	Year
Record high °C (°F)	18.8 (65.8)	21.9 (71.4)	15.5 (59.9)	12.6 (54.7)	12.6 (54.7)	9.3 (48.7)	8.8 (47.8)	7.8 (46.0)	9.4 (48.9)	13.3 (55.9)	15.7 (60.3)	19.8 (67.6)	21.9 (71.4)
Mean daily maximum °C (°F)	8.6 (47.5)	8.7 (47.7)	7.9 (46.2)	4.6 (40.3)	2.4 (36.3)	0.5 (32.9)	−1.4 (29.5)	−0.9 (30.4)	1.0 (33.8)	2.1 (35.8)	4.2 (39.6)	6.9 (44.4)	3.7 (38.7)
Daily mean °C (°F)	5.2 (41.4)	5.4 (41.7)	4.6 (40.3)	1.2 (34.2)	−0.5 (31.1)	−2.4 (27.7)	−4.3 (24.3)	−3.6 (25.5)	−2.1 (28.2)	−1.3 (29.7)	0.7 (33.3)	3.3 (37.9)	0.5 (32.9)
Mean daily minimum °C (°F)	1.8 (35.2)	2.1 (35.8)	1.3 (34.3)	−2.2 (28.0)	−3.3 (26.1)	−5.3 (22.5)	−7.1 (19.2)	−6.3 (20.7)	−5.3 (22.5)	−4.7 (23.5)	−2.8 (27.0)	−0.2 (31.6)	−2.7 (27.2)
Record low °C (°F)	−11.6 (11.1)	−8.4 (16.9)	−9.1 (15.6)	−17.0 (1.4)	−18.5 (−1.3)	−18.7 (−1.7)	−18.9 (−2.0)	−18.4 (−1.1)	−16.9 (1.6)	−14.2 (6.4)	−13.2 (8.2)	−10.4 (13.3)	−18.9 (−2.0)
Source: NIWA

== Blanket Bay ==
Blanket Bay, located just to the south of Glenorchy, is the site of the settlement's airstrip. The bay's name dates from the shearing of sheep in the area by 19th-century farmers, who would shelter in rudimentary tents close to the bay's shore made from blankets.

== Transportation ==
Glenorchy Aerodrome is a small general aviation airfield situated just south of the township near Lake Wakatipu. The airstrip includes two helipads, and is primarily used by small private planes and by helicopters, mainly from the Department of Conservation. The Queenstown Airport Corporation manages the airstrip & provides maintenance services.

== See also ==
- Glenorchy Air
