= Rees River =

Coordinates: 44°51′S 168°23′E

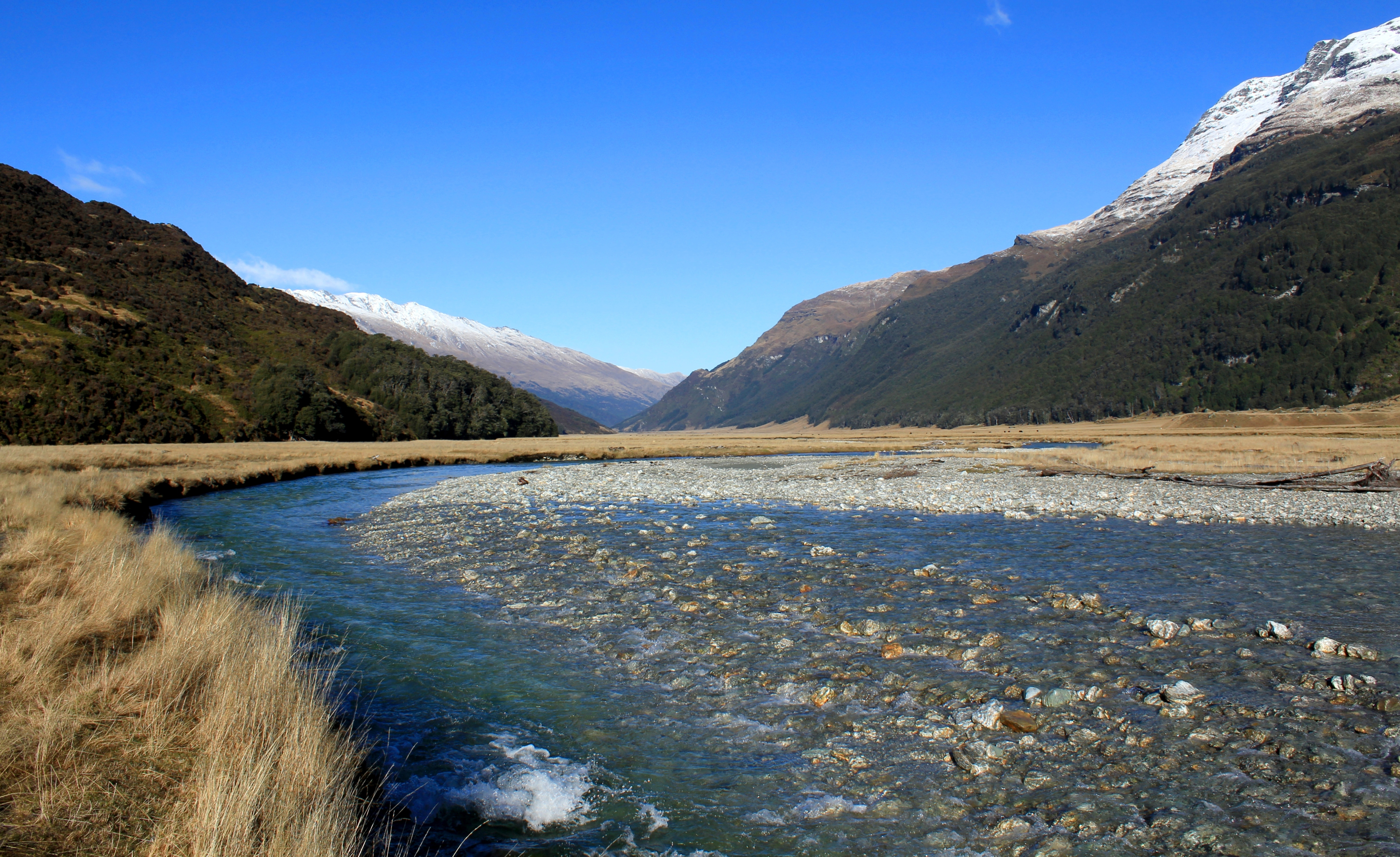
- Native name: Puahiri (Māori); Puahere (Māori)

Location
- Country: New Zealand

Physical characteristics
- Mouth
  - location: Glenorchy
  - elevation: 320 m
- Length: 41 km
- Basin size: 406 km^{2}
- Discharge
  - average: 26 cumecs

The Rees River (Māori language: Puahiri or Puahere) is a headwater tributary of the Clutha River / Mata-Au that drains eastward of the main divide of the Southern Alps / Kā Tiritiri o te Moana in New Zealand. The river runs 41 km, drains an area of 406 km^{2}, and discharges into the head of Lake Wakatipu at Glenorchy. Bound by the Richardson (Whakaari) Mountains to the east and the Forbes Mountains to the west, its snow-covered headwaters rise above 2000 m.

The upper parts of the Rees River occupy a formerly glaciated valley that was fed by the Tyndall Glacier, which now drains into the adjacent Dart Valley. Below Rees Saddle the river valley is constrained by a series of steep alluvial fans that are fed from tributary basins. The lithology of the Rees catchment is highly erodible schist of the Aspiring lithologic association. The underlying schist is highly fissive due to its fine-grain, segregated quart-feldspar-mica composition.

The Rees valley, covered in tussock and native forest, is a popular location for recreational fly fishing, pack rafting and tramping, including the Rees and Dart Tracks, a five-day loop which crosses from the upper reaches of the Rees into the valley of the Dart River / Te Awa Whakatipu. However, the steep hillsides, easily erodible rock, proximity to the Alpine Fault, and intense rainfalls contribute to geohazard risks in the region. A debris flow swept away a hiker during a river crossing in an unnamed tributary in the Upper Rees Valley near Cleft Peak in January 2002.

The Rees river and valley get their gazetted name from the high country station, was originally part of the runs established by William Gilbert Rees, the first sheep farmer in the Wakatipu Basin. Ownership of the station has been in the Scott family since 1905; the Rees Valley Station is maintained in perpetuity as a part of Crown Pastoral Lease.

== In popular culture ==
The lower Rees Valley, which continues to operate as a beef and sheep grazing farm, was a filming location for Mission: Impossible – Fallout, and the television drama series Top of the Lake.

== See also ==
- List of rivers of New Zealand
