= The Lord of the Rings: The Fellowship of the Ring =

2001 film by Peter Jackson

- Theatrical release poster
- Directed by: Peter Jackson
- Screenplay by: Fran Walsh; Philippa Boyens; Peter Jackson
- Based on: The Fellowship of the Ring by J. R. R. Tolkien
- Produced by: Barrie M. Osborne; Peter Jackson; Fran Walsh; Tim Sanders
- Starring: Elijah Wood; Ian McKellen; Liv Tyler; Viggo Mortensen; Sean Astin; Cate Blanchett; John Rhys-Davies; Billy Boyd; Dominic Monaghan; Orlando Bloom; Christopher Lee; Hugo Weaving; Sean Bean; Ian Holm; Andy Serkis
- Cinematography: Andrew Lesnie
- Edited by: John Gilbert
- Music by: Howard Shore
- Production companies: WingNut Films; New Line Cinema
- Distributed by: New Line Cinema
- Release dates: 10 December 2001 (Odeon Leicester Square); 19 December 2001 (United States); 20 December 2001 (New Zealand)
- Running time: 178 minutes
- Countries: New Zealand; United States
- Language: English
- Budget: $93 million
- Box office: $897.5 million

The Lord of the Rings: The Fellowship of the Ring is a 2001 epic fantasy film directed by Peter Jackson from a screenplay by Fran Walsh, Philippa Boyens, and Jackson. It is based on J. R. R. Tolkien's 1954 The Fellowship of the Ring, the first volume of the novel The Lord of the Rings. The film is the first instalment in the Lord of the Rings trilogy. It features an ensemble cast including Elijah Wood, Ian McKellen, Liv Tyler, Viggo Mortensen, Sean Astin, Cate Blanchett, John Rhys-Davies, Billy Boyd, Dominic Monaghan in his film debut, Orlando Bloom, Christopher Lee, Hugo Weaving, Sean Bean, Ian Holm, and Andy Serkis.

Set in Middle-earth, the story tells of the Dark Lord Sauron, who seeks the One Ring, which contains part of his might, to return to power. The Ring has found its way to the young hobbit Frodo Baggins. The fate of Middle-earth hangs in the balance as Frodo and eight companions (who form the eponymous Fellowship of the Ring) begin their perilous journey to Mount Doom in the land of Mordor, the only place where the Ring can be destroyed. The Fellowship of the Ring was financed and distributed by American studio New Line Cinema, but filmed and edited entirely in Jackson's native New Zealand, concurrently with the other two parts of the trilogy.

It premiered on 10 December 2001 at the Odeon Leicester Square in London and was released on 19 December in the United States and on 20 December in New Zealand. The film was acclaimed by critics and audiences, who considered it a landmark in filmmaking and an achievement in the fantasy film genre, with praise for the visual effects, performances, direction, screenplay, musical score, and faithfulness to the source material. It grossed $868 million worldwide during its original theatrical run, making it the second-highest-grossing film of 2001 and the fifth-highest-grossing film of all time at the time of its release. Following subsequent reissues, it has grossed $897 million. Like its successors, The Fellowship of the Ring is widely recognised as one of the greatest and most influential films ever made. The film received numerous accolades; at the 74th Academy Awards, it was nominated for thirteen awards, including Best Picture, winning for Best Cinematography, Best Makeup, Best Original Score, and Best Visual Effects.

In 2007, the American Film Institute named it one of the 100 greatest American films in history, being both the most recent film and the only film released in the 21st century to make it to the list. In 2021, the film was selected for preservation in the United States National Film Registry by the Library of Congress for being "culturally, historically, or aesthetically significant". Two sequels, The Two Towers and The Return of the King, followed in 2002 and 2003, respectively.

== Plot ==
In the Second Age of Middle-earth, the lords of Elves, Dwarves, and Men each receive Rings of Power. Unbeknownst to them, the Dark Lord Sauron forges the One Ring, imbuing it with his power to control the other Rings and conquer Middle-earth. An alliance of Men and Elves battles Sauron's forces in Mordor. Isildur of Gondor severs Sauron's finger, vanquishing him and returning him to spirit form, marking the beginning of the Third Age. The Ring corrupts Isildur, who takes it and is later killed by Orcs. The Ring is lost in a river for 2,500 years until Gollum finds it and possesses it for five centuries, until it abandons him and a hobbit named Bilbo Baggins finds it.

Decades later, Bilbo celebrates his 111th birthday in the Shire with his old friend, the wizard Gandalf the Grey. He leaves the Shire for one last adventure and passes on his inheritance, including the Ring, to his nephew Frodo. Gandalf investigates the Ring, learns its true nature, and discovers that Sauron captured Gollum, who revealed two words during interrogation: "Shire" and "Baggins". Gandalf warns Frodo to leave the Shire. As Frodo departs with his gardener friend, Samwise Gamgee, Gandalf travels to Isengard to consult with the wizard Saruman. Saruman reveals Sauron has dispatched his nine Nazgûl servants to retrieve the Ring. Gandalf immediately tries to flee to warn Frodo, but Saruman, who is revealed to be allied with Sauron, imprisons him.

Frodo and Sam join up with fellow hobbits Merry and Pippin and evade the Nazgûl before reaching Bree to meet Gandalf, who never arrives. A Ranger named Strider helps them reach Rivendell, but the Nazgûl ambush them on Weathertop and wound Frodo with a Morgul blade. Arwen, Strider's Elf beloved, finds them, rescues Frodo, and takes him to Rivendell to be healed and reunite with Gandalf, who escaped Isengard on a Great Eagle. That night, Arwen declares to Strider she is willing to sacrifice her immortality for their love.

After Gandalf tells him that they now face threats from both Sauron and Saruman, Arwen's father, Lord Elrond, holds a council of Elves, Men, and Dwarves, also attended by Frodo and Gandalf. There they decide the Ring must be destroyed. However, Elrond explains that it can only be destroyed in the fires of Mount Doom, the volcano where it was forged. Frodo volunteers to take the Ring, accompanied by Gandalf, Sam, Merry, Pippin, the Elf Legolas, the Dwarf Gimli, Boromir of Gondor, and Strider—who is actually Aragorn, Isildur's heir and the rightful King of Gondor.

The Fellowship of the Ring are forced to travel through the Mines of Moria due to a storm summoned by Saruman. Gandalf warns Frodo that Gollum, released from Sauron's fortress, has been trailing them to reclaim the Ring. They find the Dwarves of Moria dead and are attacked by Orcs and a troll. While they hold off the attack, a Balrog pursues them. The others escape as Gandalf confronts the Balrog and falls into a deep chasm while battling it. The devastated Fellowship reaches Lothlórien, where Galadriel, the Elf-queen, tells Frodo that he alone can complete the quest and warns that one of his companions will try to take the Ring. She shows him a vision of Sauron enslaving Middle-earth should he fail. Meanwhile, Saruman creates an army of Uruk-hai in Isengard to destroy the Fellowship.

The Fellowship travels to Parth Galen by river. As Galadriel warned, Boromir confronts Frodo privately and tries to take the Ring. Uruk-hai scouts ambush the group; their leader, Lurtz, mortally wounds Boromir as he fails to stop them from capturing Merry and Pippin. Aragorn arrives and kills Lurtz, comforts Boromir in his final moments, and promises to aid Gondor in their conflict. Worried the Ring will corrupt his friends, Frodo decides to go to Mordor alone, but Sam insists on accompanying him, honouring Gandalf's promise to protect him. Aragorn, Legolas, and Gimli plan to rescue Merry and Pippin, while Frodo and Sam navigate the pass of Emyn Muil towards Mordor.

== Cast ==
The eponymous Fellowship from left to right: (Top row) Aragorn, Gandalf, Legolas, Boromir, (bottom row) Sam, Frodo, Merry, Pippin, Gimli

Before filming began on 11 October 1999, the principal actors trained for six weeks in sword fighting (with Bob Anderson), riding and boating. Jackson hoped such activities would allow the cast to bond so chemistry would be evident on screen as well as getting them used to life in Wellington. They were trained to pronounce Tolkien's verses properly. After the shoot, the nine cast members playing the Fellowship got a tattoo, the Elvish symbol for the number nine, with the exception of John Rhys-Davies, whose stunt double got the tattoo instead. The film is noted for having an ensemble cast, and some of the cast and their respective characters include:

- Elijah Wood as Frodo Baggins: A young hobbit who inherits the One Ring from his uncle Bilbo. Wood was the first actor to be cast on 7 July 1999. Wood was a fan of The Hobbit, and he sent in an audition dressed as Frodo, reading lines from The Lord of the Rings. Wood was selected from 150 actors who auditioned. Jake Gyllenhaal unsuccessfully auditioned for the role after his agency miscommunicated his direction to an American accent.
- Ian McKellen as Gandalf the Grey: An Istari wizard and mentor to Frodo. Sean Connery was approached for the role, but did not understand the plot, while Patrick Stewart turned it down as he disliked the script. In 2026, Jackson stated that he was glad that Connery declined as he felt he would not have the same chemistry as McKellen did. Patrick McGoohan was offered the role, but turned it down due to health issues. Anthony Hopkins and Christopher Plummer likewise turned down the role. Richard Harris expressed interest in the part. John Astin and David Bowie auditioned for Gandalf. Sam Neill was offered the role but declined due to his scheduling conflict with Jurassic Park III. Before being cast, McKellen had to sort his schedule with 20th Century Fox as there was a two-month overlap with X-Men. He enjoyed playing Gandalf the Grey more than his transformed state in the next two films, and based his accent on a recording of Tolkien reading The Hobbit. Unlike his on-screen character, McKellen did not spend much time with the actors playing the Hobbits; instead he worked with their scale doubles.
- Viggo Mortensen as Aragorn: A Dúnedain ranger and heir to Gondor's throne. Daniel Day-Lewis was offered the part at the beginning of pre-production, but turned it down. Nicolas Cage received an offer but declined because of family obligations. Stuart Townsend was cast in the role, before being replaced during filming when Jackson realised he was too young. Russell Crowe was considered as a replacement, but he turned it down because he believed Jackson was not interested in casting him. Day-Lewis was offered the role for a second time, but declined again. Jason Patric too was considered. Executive producer Mark Ordesky saw Mortensen in a play. Mortensen's son, a fan of the book, convinced him to take the role. Mortensen read the book on the plane, received a crash course lesson in fencing from Bob Anderson and began filming the scenes on Weathertop. Mortensen became a hit with the crew by patching up his costume and carrying his "hero" sword around with him off-camera.
- Sean Astin as Samwise Gamgee: Better known as Sam, a hobbit gardener and Frodo's best friend. Astin, who had recently become a father, bonded with the 18-year-old Wood in a protective manner, which mirrored Sam's relationship with Frodo. Before Astin was cast, James Corden, Graham Norton, and Corey Feldman read for the part.
- Sean Bean as Boromir: A son of the Stewards of Gondor who journeys with the Fellowship towards Mordor. Bean was initially considered for Aragorn. Bruce Willis, a fan of the book, expressed interest in the role, while Liam Neeson was sent the script, but passed.
- Billy Boyd as Peregrin Took: Better known as Pippin, an extremely foolish hobbit who is a distant cousin of Frodo and travels with the Fellowship on their journey to Mordor.
- Dominic Monaghan as Meriadoc Brandybuck: Better known as Merry, a distant cousin of Frodo. Monaghan was cast as Merry after auditioning for Frodo.
- John Rhys-Davies as Gimli: A dwarf warrior who accompanies the Fellowship to Mordor after they set out from Rivendell. Billy Connolly, who was considered for the part of Gimli, later portrayed Dáin II Ironfoot in Peter Jackson's The Hobbit film trilogy. Rhys-Davies wore heavy prosthetics to play Gimli, which limited his vision, and eventually he developed eczema around his eyes. Rhys-Davies also played Gimli's father Glóin during the scene where the fellowship is forged.
- Orlando Bloom as Legolas: A prince of the elves' Woodland Realm and a skilled archer. Bloom initially auditioned for Faramir, who appears in the second film, a role which went to David Wenham.
- Liv Tyler as Arwen: An elf of Rivendell and Aragorn's lover. The filmmakers approached Tyler after seeing her performance in Plunkett & Macleane, and New Line Cinema leaped at the opportunity of having one Hollywood star in the film. Actress Helena Bonham Carter had expressed interest in the role. Tyler came to shoot on short occasions, unlike the rest of the actors. She was one of the last actors to be cast, on 25 August 1999.
- Cate Blanchett as Galadriel: The elven co-ruler of Lothlórien alongside her husband Celeborn. Lucy Lawless was considered for the role, but turned it down as she was pregnant, she would later regret the decision.
- Christopher Lee as Saruman the White: The fallen head of the Istari Order who succumbs to Sauron's will through his use of the palantír. Lee was a major fan of the book, read it once a year, and had met Tolkien. He originally auditioned for Gandalf, but was judged too old.
- Hugo Weaving as Elrond: The Elven-Lord of Rivendell and Arwen's father who leads the Council of Elrond, which ultimately decides to destroy the Ring. David Bowie expressed interest in the role, but Jackson stated, "To have a famous, beloved character and a famous star colliding is slightly uncomfortable."
- Ian Holm as Bilbo Baggins: Frodo's uncle who gives him the Ring after he decides to retire to Rivendell. Holm previously played Frodo in a 1981 radio adaption of The Lord of the Rings, and was cast as Bilbo after Jackson remembered his performance. Sylvester McCoy, who later played Radagast the Brown in The Hobbit, was contacted about playing the role, and was kept in place as a potential Bilbo for six months before Jackson went with Holm.
- Andy Serkis as Gollum (voice/motion-capture): A wretched hobbit-like creature whose mind was poisoned by the Ring after bearing it for 500 years. This character appears briefly in the prologue. In Mordor, one can only hear his voice shouting and in Moria, only his eyes and his nose appear. Serkis was working on the 1999 six-episode Oliver Twist miniseries when his agent told him that Jackson wanted to approach him to play Gollum. Despite ultimately accepting the role, Serkis was initially doubtful about taking the part as one of his Oliver Twist fellow actors opined that it was not a good idea if his face was not going to appear onscreen, aside that Jackson was unsure if Gollum could be portrayed with motion-capture performance as they wished.

== Comparison to the book ==
Jackson, Walsh and Boyens made numerous changes to the story, for purposes of pacing and character development. Jackson said his main desire was to make a film focused primarily on Frodo and the Ring, the "backbone" of the story. The prologue condenses Tolkien's backstory, in which The Last Alliance's seven-year siege of Barad-dûr is a single battle, where Sauron is shown to explode, though Tolkien only said his spirit flees.

Some events and characters from the book are condensed or omitted (as with Tom Bombadil) at the beginning of the film. The time between Gandalf leaving the Ring to Frodo and returning to reveal its inscription, which is 17 years in the book, is compressed for timing reasons. The filmmakers also decided to move the opening scenes of The Two Towers, the Uruk-hai ambush and Boromir's death, to the film's linear climax.

The tone of the Moria sequence was altered. In the book, following the defeat on the Caradhras road, Gandalf advocates the Moria road against the resistance of the rest of the Company (save Gimli), suggesting "there is a hope that Moria is still free...there is even a chance that Dwarves are there," though no one seems to think this likely. Frodo proposes they take a company vote, but the discovery of Wargs on their trail forces them to accept Gandalf's proposal. They only realise the Dwarves are all dead once they reach Balin's tomb. The filmmakers chose instead for Gandalf to resist the Moria plan as a foreshadowing device. Gandalf says to Gimli he would prefer not to enter Moria, and Saruman is shown to be aware of Gandalf's hesitance, revealing an illustration of the Balrog in one of his books. The corpses of the dwarves are instantly shown as the Company enter Moria. One detail that critics have commented upon is that, in the novel, Pippin tosses a mere pebble into the well in Moria ("They then hear what sounds like a hammer tapping in the distance"), whereas in the film, he knocks an entire skeleton in ("Next, the skeleton ... falls down the well, also dragging down a chain and bucket. The noise is incredible.").

== Production ==
=== Development ===
Director Peter Jackson began working with Christian Rivers to storyboard the series in August 1997, as well as getting Richard Taylor and Weta Workshop to begin creating his interpretation of Middle-earth. Jackson told them to make Middle-earth as plausible and believable as possible, and to think of it in a historical manner.

In November, Alan Lee and John Howe became the film trilogy's primary conceptual designers, having had previous experience as illustrators for the book and various other tie-ins. Lee worked for the Art Department creating places such as Rivendell, Isengard, Moria, and Lothlórien, giving Art Nouveau and geometry influences to the Elves and Dwarves respectively. Though Howe contributed with Bag End and the Argonath, he focused on the design of the characters' armour, having studied it his entire life. Weta and the Art Department continued to design, with Grant Major turning the Art Department's designs into architecture, and Dan Hennah scouting locations. On 1 April 1999, Ngila Dickson joined the crew as costume designer. She and 40 seamstresses created 19,000 costumes, 40 per version for the actor and their doubles, wearing them out for an impression of age.

=== Filming locations ===
Arwen confronts the Nazgûl at the Ford of Bruinen near Rivendell.

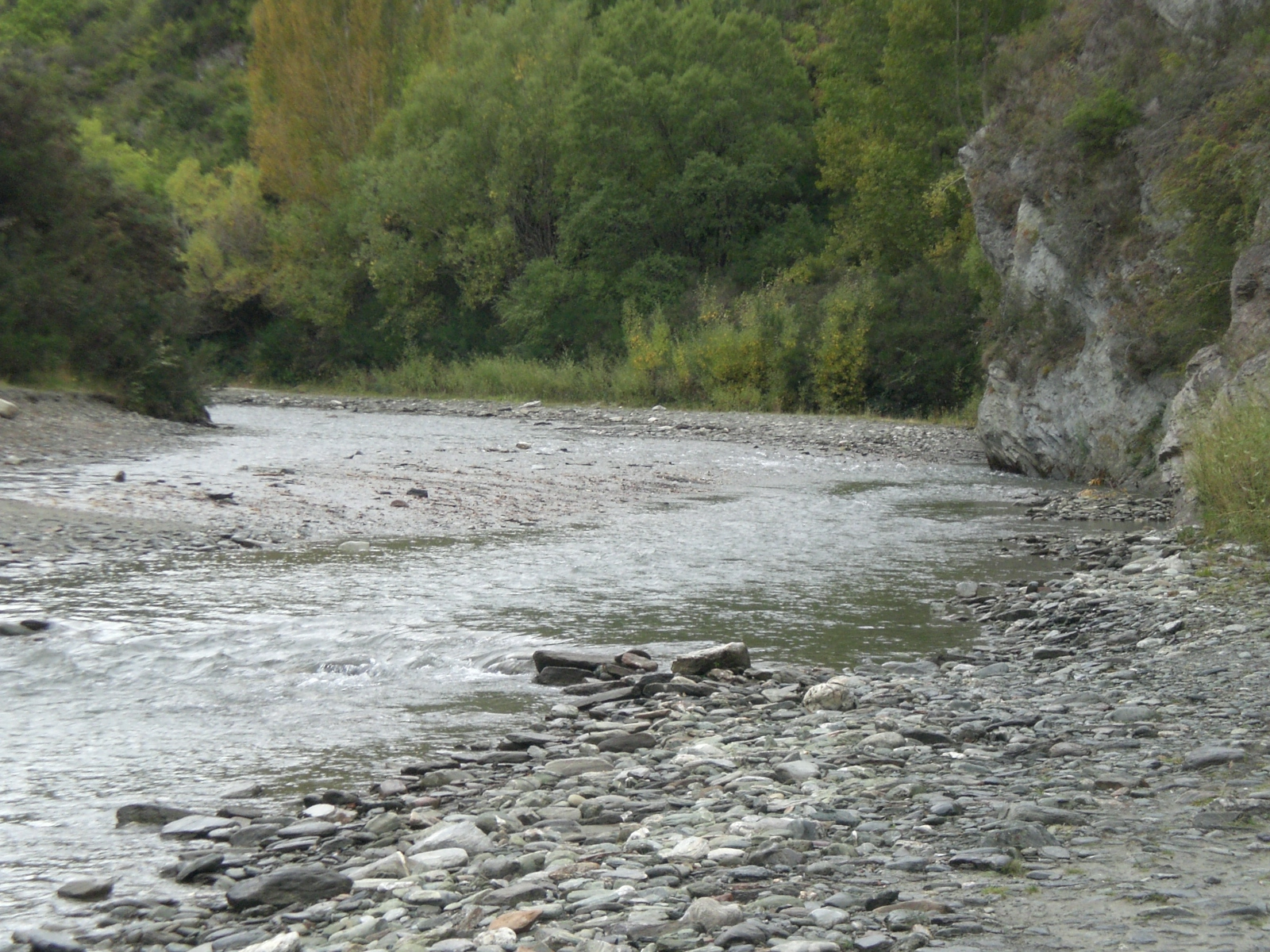
The Arrow River, in the Otago region of South Island

In the film, the Ford of Bruinen was represented by the Arrow River, one of many New Zealand locations used in the filming.

Filming took place at many places across New Zealand. For example, the Arrow River, in the Otago region of South Island, stood in for the Ford of Bruinen, where Arwen confronts the nine Nazgûl. Below is a list of filming locations, sorted by their order of appearance in the film:

Fictional location	Specific location in New Zealand	General area in New Zealand
Mordor (Prologue)	Whakapapa skifield	Tongariro National Park
Hobbiton	Matamata	Waikato
Gardens of Isengard	Harcourt Park	Upper Hutt
The Shire woods	Otaki Gorge Road	Kāpiti Coast District
Bucklebury Ferry	Keeling Farm, Manakau	Horowhenua
Forest near Bree	Tākaka Hill	Tasman District
Trollshaws	Waitarere Forest	Horowhenua
Flight to the Ford	Tarras	Central Otago
Ford of Bruinen	Arrow River, Skippers Canyon	Queenstown and Arrowtown
Rivendell	Kaitoke Regional Park	Upper Hutt
Eregion	Mount Olympus	Windwhistle
Dead Marshes	Kepler Mire	Southland
Dimrill Dale	Lake Alta	The Remarkables
Dimrill Dale	Mount Owen	Tasman District
Lothlórien	Paradise	Glenorchy
River Anduin	Upper Waiau River	Fiordland National Park
River Anduin	Rangitīkei River	Rangitikei District
River Anduin	Poets' Corner	Upper Hutt
Parth Galen	Paradise	Glenorchy
Amon Hen	Mavora Lakes, Paradise and Closeburn	Southern Lakes

=== Score ===
The film score was composed by Howard Shore. It was performed by the New Zealand Symphony Orchestra, the London Philharmonic Orchestra, the London Voices, The London Oratory School Schola, and the Maori Samoan Choir, and featured several vocal soloists. Two original songs, "Aníron" and the end title theme "May It Be", were composed and sung by Enya, who allowed her label, Reprise Records, to release the soundtrack to The Fellowship of the Ring and its two sequels. In addition to these, Shore composed "In Dreams", sung by Edward Ross of the London Oratory School Schola.

== Release ==
=== Theatrical ===
The world premiere of The Fellowship of the Ring was held at the Odeon Leicester Square in London on 10 December 2001. It was released on Wednesday, 19 December 2001 internationally in most major territories on 10,000 screens.

=== Marketing ===
A special featurette trailer was released in April 2000. This trailer was downloaded over 1.7 million times within its first 24 hours of release, breaking Star Wars: Episode I – The Phantom Menace's for being the most downloaded trailer.

=== Home media ===
==== Theatrical version ====
The theatrical version of The Fellowship of the Ring was released on VHS and DVD on 6 August 2002 by New Line Home Entertainment. It was the best-selling DVD release at the time with 14.5 million copies being sold. This record was dethroned by Finding Nemo the following year.

The Blu-ray edition of the theatrical The Lord of the Rings trilogy was released in the United States on 6 April 2010. There were two separate sets: one with digital copies and one without. The individual Blu-ray disc of The Fellowship of the Ring was released on 14 September 2010 with the same special features as the complete trilogy release, except there was no digital copy.

==== Extended version ====
On 12 November 2002, an extended edition was released on VHS and DVD, with 30 minutes of new material, added special effects and music, plus 20 minutes of fan-club credits, totalling 228 minutes. The DVD set included four commentaries and over three hours of supplementary material.

Extended Blu-ray editions were released in the US on 28 June 2011. This version has a runtime of 228 minutes.

The Fellowship of the Ring was released in Ultra HD Blu-ray on 30 November 2020 in the United Kingdom and on 1 December 2020 in the United States, along with the other films of the trilogy, including both the theatrical and the extended editions of the films.

== Reception ==
=== Box office ===
On its opening day, The Fellowship of the Ring grossed $18.2 million in the United States and Canada from 3,359 cinemas and $11.5 million in 13 countries, including $3 million from 466 screens in the United Kingdom. It grossed $75.1 million in its first five days in the United States and Canada, including $47.2 million on its opening weekend, placing it at number one at the US box office, setting a December opening record, beating Ocean's Eleven.

The film also opened at number one in 29 international markets and remained there for a second week in all but the Netherlands. It set a record opening day gross in Australia with $2.09 million from 405 screens, beating the record $1.3 million set by Star Wars: Episode I – The Phantom Menace. It had a record opening weekend in Germany with 1.5 million admissions and in Spain with a gross of $5.3 million from 395 screens. It also grossed a record $2.5 million in 15 days in New Zealand. This record would last for less than a decade before being surpassed by Avatar. In Denmark, it became the country's highest-grossing film, surpassing Titanic. In its first 15 days, the film had grossed $183.5 million internationally and $178.7 million in the United States and Canada for a worldwide total of $362.2 million.

In its initial release, it went on to gross $313.4 million in the United States and Canada and $555 million in the rest of the world for a worldwide total of $868.4 million. Box Office Mojo estimates that the film sold over 54 million tickets in the US and Canada in its initial theatrical run. Following subsequent reissues, the film has grossed $326 million in the United States and Canada and $570 million in the rest of the world for a worldwide total of $897 million.

=== Critical response ===
On review aggregator Rotten Tomatoes, The Lord of the Rings: The Fellowship of the Ring holds an approval rating of 91% based on 269 reviews. The website's critics consensus reads, "Full of eye-popping special effects, and featuring a pitch-perfect cast, The Lord of the Rings: The Fellowship of the Ring brings J.R.R. Tolkien's classic to vivid life." Metacritic, which uses a weighted average, assigned the film a score of 92 out of 100 based on 34 critics, indicating "universal acclaim". Audiences polled by CinemaScore gave the film an average grade of "A−" on an A+ to F scale.

Colin Kennedy for Empire gave the film five stars out of five, writing "Brooking no argument, history should quickly regard Peter Jackson's The Fellowship of the Ring as the first instalment of the best fantasy epic in motion picture history... Putting formula blockbusters to shame, Fellowship is impeccably cast and constructed with both care and passion: this is a labour of love that never feels laboured. Emotional range and character depth ultimately take us beyond genre limitations..." Roger Ebert of the Chicago Sun-Times gave the film three out of four stars and stating that while it is not "a true visualization of Tolkien's Middle-earth", it is "a work for, and of, our times. It will be embraced, I suspect, by many Tolkien fans and will take on aspects of a cult. It is a candidate for many Oscars. It is an awesome production in its daring and breadth, and there are small touches that are just right". USA Today also gave the film three out of four stars and wrote, "this movie version of a beloved book should please devotees as well as the uninitiated". In his review for The New York Times, Elvis Mitchell wrote, "The playful spookiness of Mr. Jackson's direction provides a lively, light touch, a gesture that doesn't normally come to mind when Tolkien's name is mentioned". Lisa Schwarzbaum for Entertainment Weekly gave the film an A grade and wrote "The cast take to their roles with becoming modesty, certainly, but Jackson also makes it easy for them: His Fellowship flows, never lingering for the sake of admiring its own beauty ... Every detail of which engrossed me. I may have never turned a page of Tolkien, but I know enchantment when I see it". In his review for the BBC, Nev Pierce gave the film four stars out of five, describing it as "Funny, scary, and totally involving", and wrote that Jackson turned "the book's least screen-worthy volume into a gripping and powerful adventure movie". In his review for The Guardian, Xan Brooks wrote "Rather than a stand-alone holiday blockbuster, The Fellowship of the Ring offers an epic act one", and commented that the ending was "closer in spirit to an art-house film than a popcorn holiday romp".

In her review for The Washington Post, Rita Kempley gave the film five stars out of five, and praised the cast, in particular, "Mortensen, as Strider, is a revelation, not to mention downright gorgeous. And McKellen, carrying the burden of thousands of years' worth of the fight against evil, is positively Merlinesque". Time magazine's Richard Corliss praised Jackson's work: "His movie achieves what the best fairy tales do: the creation of an alternate world, plausible and persuasive, where the young — and not only the young — can lose themselves. And perhaps, in identifying with the little Hobbit that could, find their better selves". In his review for The Village Voice, J. Hoberman wrote, "Peter Jackson's adaptation is certainly successful on its own terms". Rolling Stone magazine's Peter Travers wrote, "It's emotion that makes Fellowship stick hard in the memory... Jackson deserves to revel in his success. He's made a three-hour film that leaves you wanting more". A mixed review was written by Peter Bradshaw. Writing for The Guardian, he lauded the art direction and the visual look of the film, but he also commented "there is a strange paucity of plot complication, an absence of anything unfolding, all the more disconcerting because of the clotted and indigestible mythic back story that we have to wade through before anything happens at all". Overall, Bradshaw found the tone of the film too serious and self-important, and wrote "signing up to the movie's whole hobbity-elvish universe requires a leap of faith... It's a leap I didn't feel much like making – and, with two more movie episodes like this on the way, the credibility gap looks wider than ever." Jonathan Rosenbaum was also less positive about The Fellowship of the Ring: in his review for the Chicago Reader, he granted that the film was "full of scenic splendors with a fine sense of scale", but he commented that its narrative thrust seemed "relatively pro forma", and that he found the battle scenes boring.

=== Accolades ===
In 2002, the film won four Academy Awards from thirteen nominations. It won the 2002 Hugo Award for Best Dramatic Presentation. It won Empire readers' Best Film award, as well as five BAFTAs, including Best Film, the David Lean Award for Best Direction, the Audience Award (voted for by the public), Best Special Effects, and Best Make-up. The film was nominated for an MTV Movie Award for Best Fight between Gandalf and Saruman.

In June 2008, AFI revealed its "10 Top 10"—the ten best films in ten "classic" American film genres—after polling over 1,500 people from the creative community. The Fellowship of the Ring was acknowledged as the second best film in the fantasy genre.

In 2021, members of Writers Guild of America West (WGAW) and Writers Guild of America, East (WGAE) voted its screenplay 76th in WGA's 101 Greatest Screenplays of the 21st Century (so far). In June 2025, it ranked number 87 on The New York Times' list of "The 100 Best Movies of the 21st Century" and number 14 on the "Readers' Choice" edition of the list.

Award	Category	Recipient/Nominee	Result
Academy Awards	Best Picture	Peter Jackson, Fran Walsh and Barrie M. Osborne	Nominated
Academy Awards	Best Director	Peter Jackson	Nominated
Academy Awards	Best Supporting Actor	Ian McKellen	Nominated
Academy Awards	Best Adapted Screenplay	Fran Walsh, Philippa Boyens and Peter Jackson	Nominated
Academy Awards	Best Art Direction	Grant Major and Dan Hennah	Nominated
Academy Awards	Best Cinematography	Andrew Lesnie	Won
Academy Awards	Best Costume Design	Ngila Dickson and Richard Taylor	Nominated
Academy Awards	Best Film Editing	John Gilbert	Nominated
Academy Awards	Best Makeup	Peter Owen and Richard Taylor	Won
Academy Awards	Best Original Score	Howard Shore	Won
Academy Awards	Best Original Song	Enya, Nicky Ryan and Roma Ryan ("May It Be")	Nominated
Academy Awards	Best Sound	Christopher Boyes, Michael Semanick, Gethin Creagh and Hammond Peek	Nominated
Academy Awards	Best Visual Effects	Jim Rygiel, Randall William Cook, Richard Taylor and Mark Stetson	Won
British Academy Film Awards	Best Film	Peter Jackson, Barrie M. Osborne, Fran Walsh and Tim Sanders	Won
British Academy Film Awards	Best Direction	Peter Jackson	Won
British Academy Film Awards	Best Actor in a Leading Role	Ian McKellen	Nominated
British Academy Film Awards	Best Adapted Screenplay	Fran Walsh, Philippa Boyens and Peter Jackson	Nominated
British Academy Film Awards	Best Cinematography	Andrew Lesnie	Nominated
British Academy Film Awards	Best Costume Design	Ngila Dickson and Richard Taylor	Nominated
British Academy Film Awards	Best Editing	John Gilbert	Nominated
British Academy Film Awards	Best Makeup and Hair	Peter Owen, Peter King and Richard Taylor	Won
British Academy Film Awards	Best Original Music	Howard Shore	Nominated
British Academy Film Awards	Best Production Design	Grant Major	Nominated
British Academy Film Awards	Best Sound	David Farmer, Hammond Peek, Christopher Boyes, Gethin Creagh, Michael Semanick, Ethan Van der Ryn and Mike Hopkins	Nominated
British Academy Film Awards	Best Special Visual Effects	Jim Rygiel, Richard Taylor, Alex Funke, Randall William Cook and Mark Stetson	Won
Directors Guild of America Awards	Outstanding Directing – Feature Film	Peter Jackson	Nominated
Golden Globe Awards	Best Motion Picture – Drama	The Lord of the Rings: The Fellowship of the Ring	Nominated
Golden Globe Awards	Best Director	Peter Jackson	Nominated
Golden Globe Awards	Best Original Score	Howard Shore	Nominated
Golden Globe Awards	Best Original Song	Enya, Nicky Ryan and Roma Ryan ("May It Be")	Nominated
Producers Guild of America Awards	Best Theatrical Motion Picture	Barrie M. Osborne, Peter Jackson and Fran Walsh	Nominated
Saturn Awards	Best Fantasy Film	The Lord of the Rings: The Fellowship of the Ring	Won
Saturn Awards	Best Director	Peter Jackson	Won
Saturn Awards	Best Supporting Actor	Ian McKellen	Won
Saturn Awards	Best Writing	Peter Jackson, Fran Walsh and Philippa Boyens	Nominated
Saturn Awards	Best Costume Design	Ngila Dickson and Richard Taylor	Nominated
Saturn Awards	Best Make-up	Peter Owen and Richard Taylor	Nominated
Saturn Awards	Best Music	Howard Shore	Nominated
Saturn Awards	Best Special Effects	Jim Rygiel, Randall William Cook, Richard Taylor	Nominated
Screen Actors Guild Awards	Outstanding Performance by a Male Actor in a Supporting Role	Ian McKellen	Won
Screen Actors Guild Awards	Outstanding Performance by a Cast in a Motion Picture	The Lord of the Rings: The Fellowship of the Ring	Nominated
Writers Guild of America Awards	Best Adapted Screenplay	Fran Walsh, Philippa Boyens and Peter Jackson	Nominated

== See also ==
- List of films about witchcraft
