= Whitbourn River =

- Route of the Whitbourn River
- Mouth of the Whitbourn River Whitbourn River (New Zealand)

Location
- Country: New Zealand
- Region: Otago
- District: Queenstown-Lakes

Physical characteristics
- Source: Whitbourn Glacier
  - coordinates: 44.4709°S 168.5290°E
- Mouth
  - location: Dart River / Te Awa Whakatipu
  - coordinates: 44°31′01″S 168°31′45″E

Basin features
- Progression: Whitbourn River → Dart River / Te Awa Whakatipu → Lake Wakatipu → Kawarau River → Lake Dunstan → Clutha River / Mata-Au → Pacific Ocean

The Whitbourn River is a river of the Otago region of New Zealand's South Island. It is an upper tributary of the Dart River / Te Awa Whakatipu. The Whitbourn's entire length is within Mount Aspiring National Park.

== See also ==
- List of rivers of New Zealand
