= Blue Duck River =

- Route of the Blue Duck River
- Mouth of the Blue Duck River Blue Duck River (New Zealand)

Location
- Country: New Zealand
- Region: Otago
- District: Queenstown-Lakes District

Physical characteristics
- Source: Blue Duck Glacier
  - coordinates: 44.4918°S 168.4926°E
- Mouth
  - location: Dart River / Te Awa Whakatipu
  - coordinates: 44°31′17″S 168°30′22″E

Basin features
- Progression: Blue Duck River → Dart River / Te Awa Whakatipu → Lake Wakatipu → Kawarau River → Lake Dunstan → Clutha River → Pacific Ocean

The Blue Duck River is a river of New Zealand. A tributary of the Dart River / Te Awa Whakatipu, it rises to the south of the Blue Duck Glacier, flowing into that river east of Cattle Flat.

== See also ==
- List of rivers of New Zealand
