= Paradise, New Zealand =

Locality in New Zealand

Coordinates: 44°44′S 168°22′E

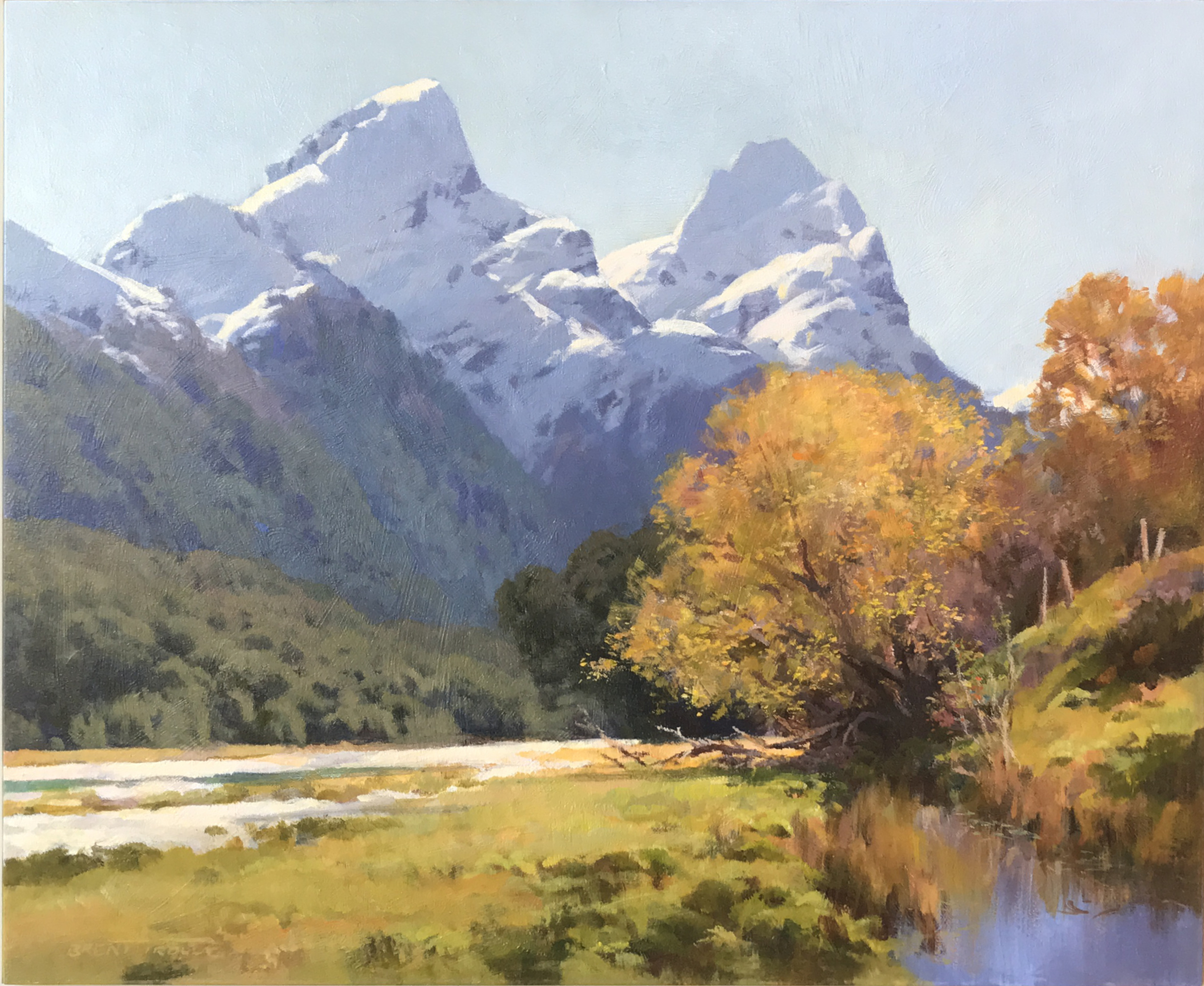
Paradise valley, Otago painted by Brent Trolle

Paradise is a rural locality in the Otago region of the South Island of New Zealand. It lies on the eastern side of the Dart River / Te Awa Whakatipu at the head of Lake Wakatipu, close to the settlement of Glenorchy.

The surrounding area is used for sheep and cattle farming. The locality has also been used as a setting in films and television.

== Art, entertainment, and media ==
=== Films ===
- The locality was used during filming of The Lord of the Rings trilogy, wherein it represented Parth Galen and parts of Lothlórien, specifically the area which the Fellowship first enters.
- It was also used in The Hobbit trilogy, for scenes of the exterior of Beorn's house.

=== Television ===
- The locality was used as the setting for much of the BBC miniseries Top of the Lake, although filming of the latter took place in the nearby town of Glenorchy.

== Origin of the name ==
A.W. Reed recorded that the locality was first known as Paradise Flat, and that a popular (but not universally accepted) view attributes the name to an abundance of paradise shelducks. Another contention, supported by Alfred Duncan's article, "Paradise and the Maori" in the Lake Wakatip Mail, in 1860, suggests that the area was named because of its beauty.
