= Dart Glacier =

Glacier in New Zealand

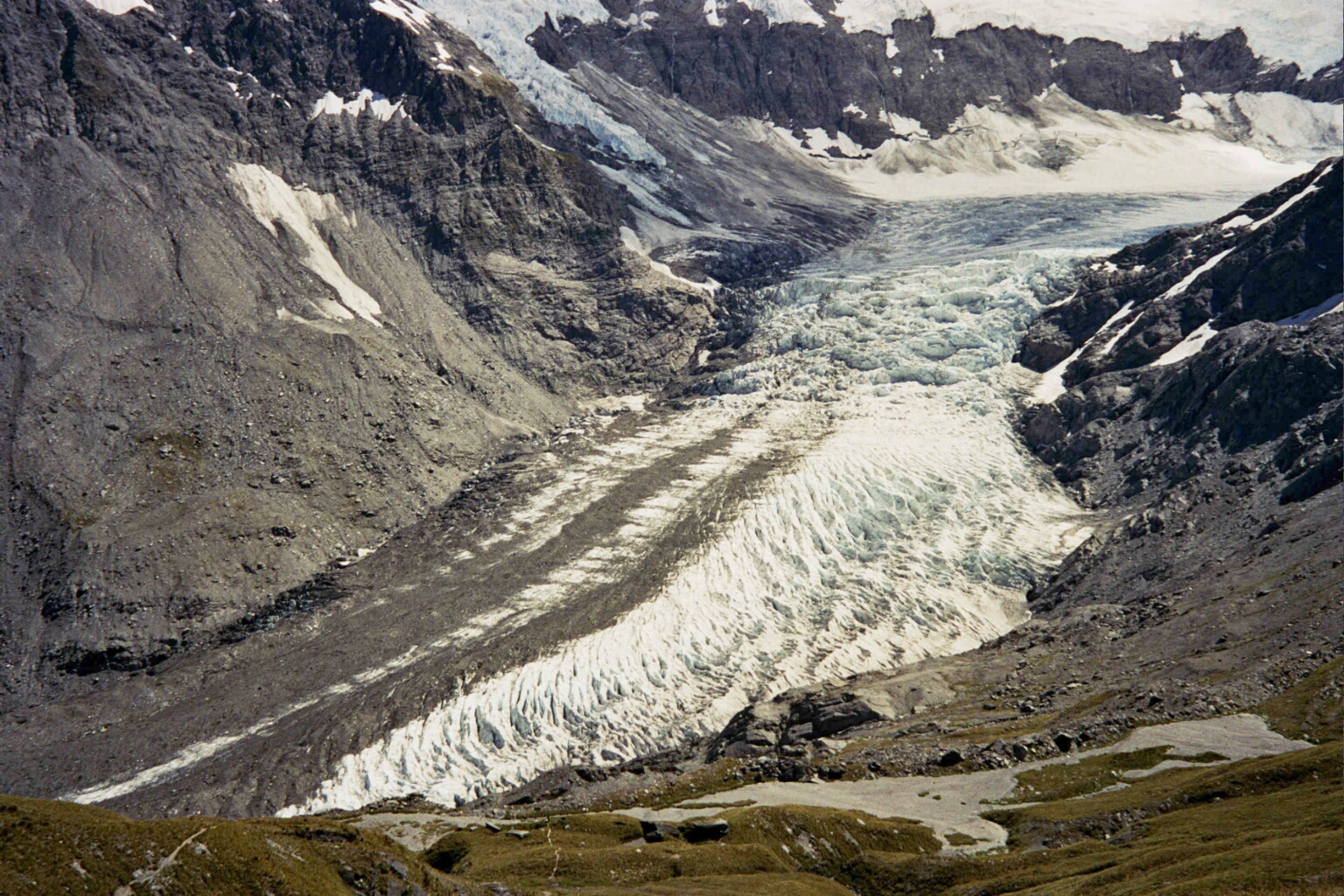
- Dart Glacier as seen from Cascade Saddle

- Location within New Zealand
- Location: Southern Alps, Otago
- Coordinates: 44.45°S 168.61°E
- Length: 6 km (3.7 mi)
- Width: 1.2 km (0.75 mi)
- Terminus: Dart River / Te Awa Whakatipu
- Status: Retreating

The Dart Glacier is an approximately six-kilometre-long (3.7 mi) glacier located in Mount Aspiring National Park, in the upper reaches of Otago, New Zealand. The glacier is the primary source of the Dart River / Te Awa Whakatipu, one of the main inflows of the nearby Lake Wakatipu before its water eventually joins the network of the Clutha River / Mata-Au some 80 kilometres (50 mi) to the southeast of the glacier's terminus.

== Geography ==
The Dart Glacier has a fairly typical morphology, including a clearly defined névé and a main trunk, separated by a small icefall. The névé is located in a basin at the eastern end of the Snowdrift Range, between Plunket Dome, Islington Dome and Mount Māori. From this, the Dart flows in a south-westerly direction for roughly 2 kilometres (1.2 mi) before narrowing to less than 400 metres (1,300 ft) and turning to flow in a south-easterly direction down a steep icefall. From here, the glacier turns again to the southwest, before quickly reaching its terminus and the start of the Dart River / Te Awa Whakatipu. Like the larger Haupapa / Tasman Glacier, the lower reaches of the Dart are covered in debris from past rockfalls on the surrounding mountains, obscuring the ice and giving it a grey colour.

The topography and climate of the Dart Glacier make it particularly responsive to changes in conditions. Since 1915, the glacier has retreated approximately 3.5 kilometres (2.2 mi), with historical records from the time showing the glacier extending further down the Dart Valley, connecting with the Hesse and Marshall glaciers in the process. Fieldwork during the 1980s also discovered pockets of ice from the glacier buried beneath a layer of gravel 10–15 metres (33–49 ft) in the Dart Valley, near where the glacier's terminus would have been in the late 19th century. The ice was estimated at 80 metres (260 ft) thick at the time of the study, though sinkholes on the surface indicated that the ice was decreasing in volume.

== History ==
While the upper Dart Valley and headwaters of Te Awa Whakatipu were a prominent source of Pounamu for early Māori, there are no oral records of the Dart Glacier from this early exploration. The first confirmed European sighting of the glacier came from Patrick Caples, a prospector exploring the area for gold during the 1860s. The glacier was further explored in the 1910s by Bernard Head, who led an expedition over the nearby Cascade Saddle before returning three years later to survey the upper Dart Valley. This expedition was the first to note the retreat of the glacier, which by the time of further studies in the 1970s had caused the Dart to retreat by more than 2 kilometres (1.2 mi). Researchers studying the glacier in the 1970s were based out of a small hut which had been helicoptered into the area to the support the study, and which was removed following its conclusion. This work claimed that, at the rate of retreat they observed, the glacier below the icefall would have disappeared by the year 2000. Recent study of the Dart has involved sampling rocks from in front of the retreating glacier to determine exposure to cosmic rays.

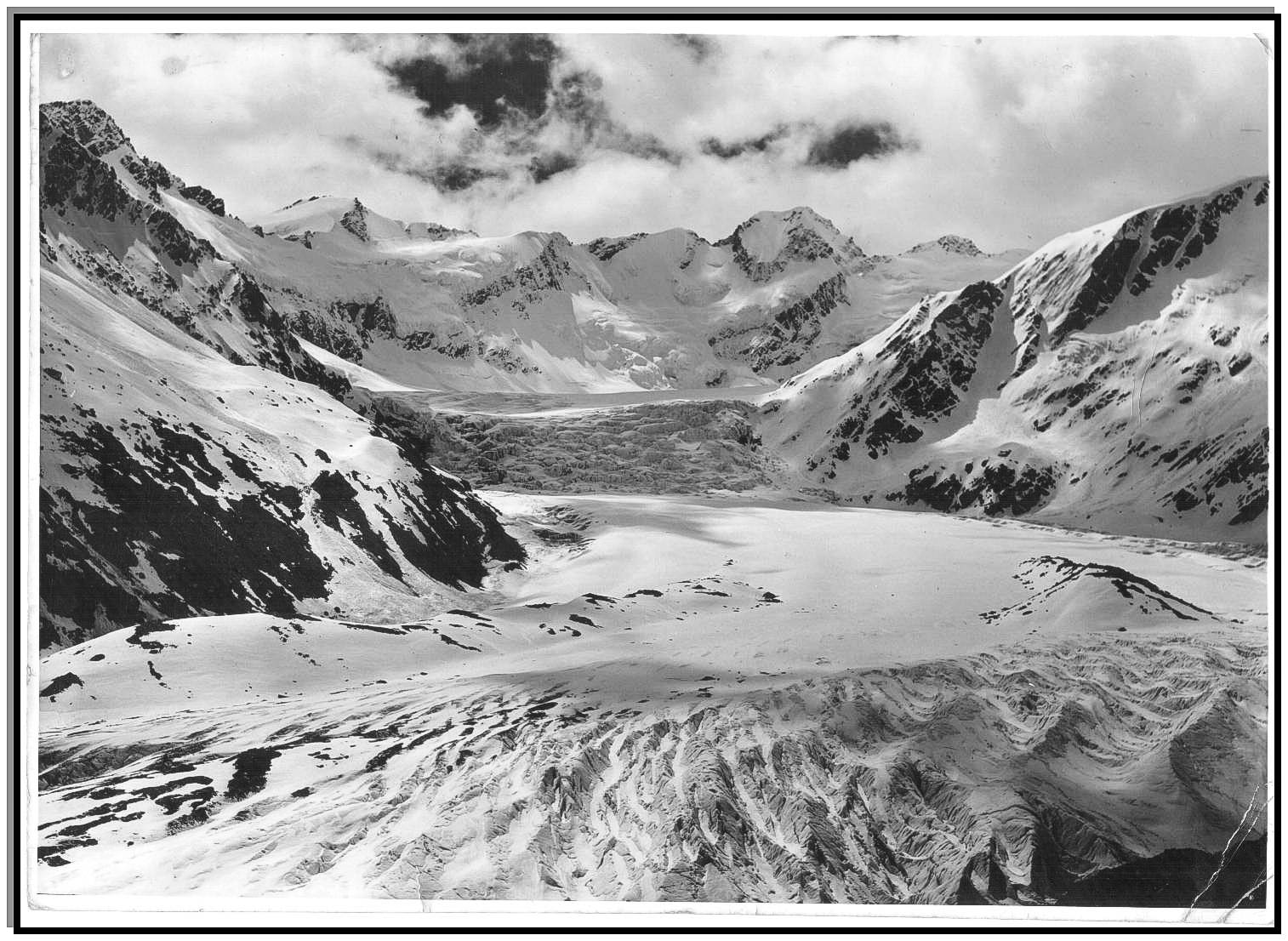
Dart Glacier in the early 1930s
