= Dart River / Te Awa Whakatipu =

Dart River / Te Awa Whakatipu Dart River, Te Awa Whakatipu
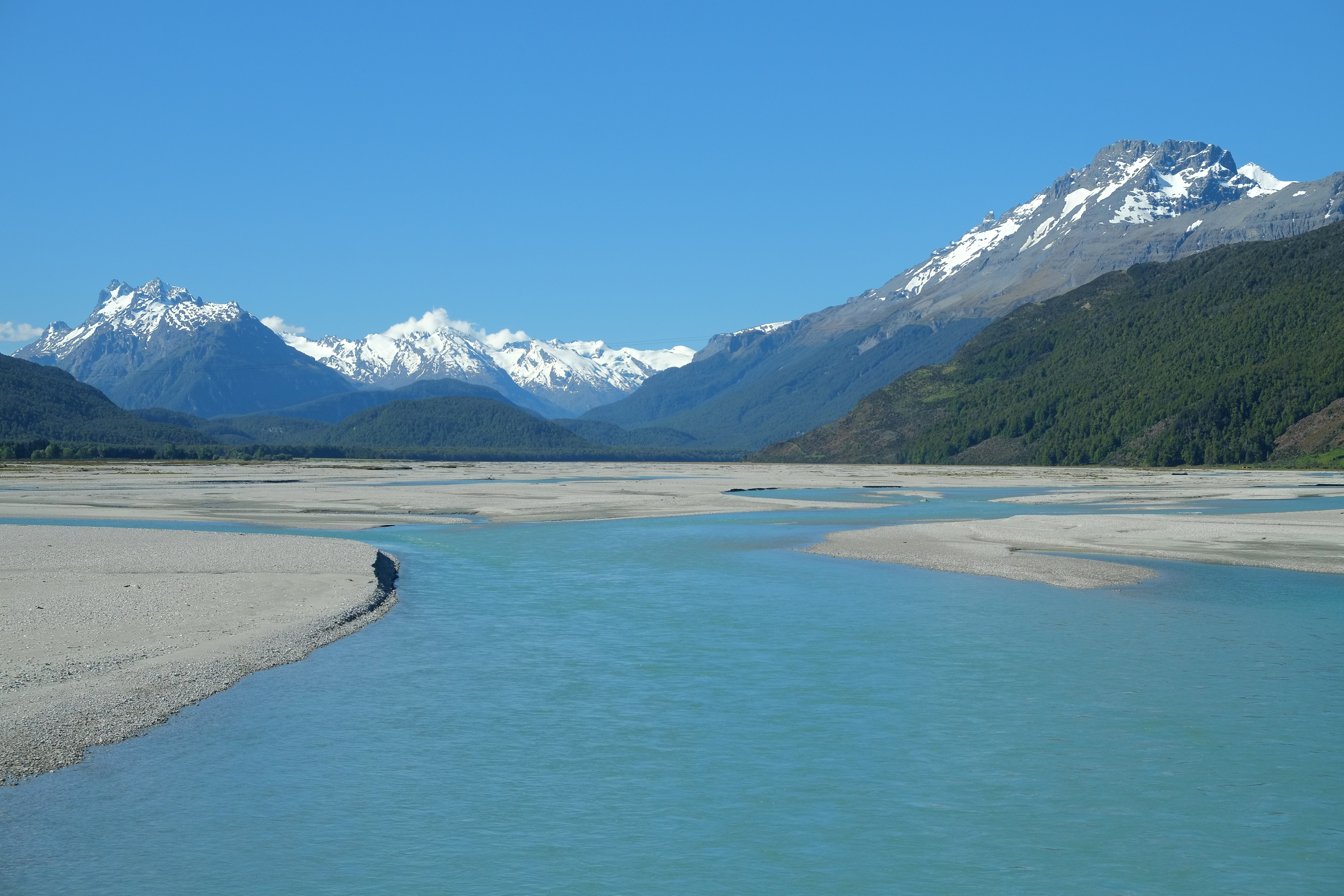
- The Dart River near Glenorchy
- Route of the Dart River / Te Awa Whakatipu
- Mouth of the Dart River / Te Awa Whakatipu Dart River / Te Awa Whakatipu (New Zealand)
- Native name: Te Awa Whakatipu (Māori)

Location
- Country: New Zealand
- Region: Otago
- District: Queenstown-Lakes

Physical characteristics
- Source: Dart Glacier
  - coordinates: 44.4807°S 168.6013°E
  - elevation: 1,025 m (3,363 ft)
- Mouth
  - location: Lake Wakatipu
  - coordinates: 44°50′48″S 168°21′53″E
  - elevation: 330 m (1,080 ft)
- Length: 60 km (37 mi)

Basin features
- Progression: Dart River / Te Awa Whakatipu → Lake Wakatipu → Kawarau River → Lake Dunstan → Clutha River / Mata-Au → Pacific Ocean
- Tributaries
  - left: Snowy Creek, Rough Creek, Whatta Creek, Bedford Stream, Dundas Creek
  - right: Whitbourn River, Blue Duck River, Pass Burn, False Pass Burn, Margaret Burn, Dredge Burn, McBride Burn, Slip Stream, Beans Burn, Rock Burn, Routeburn River, Scott Creek, Stockyard Creek, Kowhai Creek, Glacier Burn

The Dart River (officially Dart River / Te Awa Whakatipu from Māori: Te Awa Whakatipu) flows through rugged forested country in the southwestern South Island of New Zealand. Partly in Mount Aspiring National Park, it flows south-west and then south for 60 kilometres (37 mi) from its headwaters in the Southern Alps and the Dart Glacier, eventually flowing into the northern end of Lake Wakatipu near Glenorchy.

There are many popular tramping tracks in the region. The Rees-Dart Track is a five-day loop which combines the valley of Te Awa Whakatipu with the nearby Rees River. Jetboats operate on the river.

The Dart River, as many other areas in and around the Glenorchy and Queenstown area, was the location for many scenes filmed for The Lord of the Rings film trilogy. Examples are Isengard, filmed at Dan's Paddock, and Lothlórien in the forests slightly further north. The only road bridge across the river, 16 kilometres (9.9 mi) north of Glenorchy and en route to the start of the Routeburn Track, was used as the eponymous bridge in the 2020 television drama series One Lane Bridge.

The upper valley was the site of one of New Zealand's worst light aircraft accidents in 1989, when an Aspiring Air Britten-Norman Islander crashed, killing all ten people on board.

== Name ==
The river was first known by its Māori name of Te Awa Whakatipu, with te awa literally translating as 'the river'. The name Whakatipu is shared with several nearby geographic features, including Lake Wakatipu (Note: Although spelled without an H in English, the lake’s Māori name is Whakatipu Waimāori) and Whakatipu Kā Tuka (the Hollyford River) though this name is an archaic term and its original meaning is no longer known. During the 1860s, the runholder William Gilbert Rees named the river the Dart, after the river's swift flow.

In 1998, the river became one of nearly 90 geographic features to be given an official dual name as part of the Ngāi Tahu Claims Settlement Act 1998, a Treaty of Waitangi settlement between Ngāi Tahu and the Crown. This dual name combined the name Dart River with the Māori name, in recognition of the significance of both names.

== Gallery ==
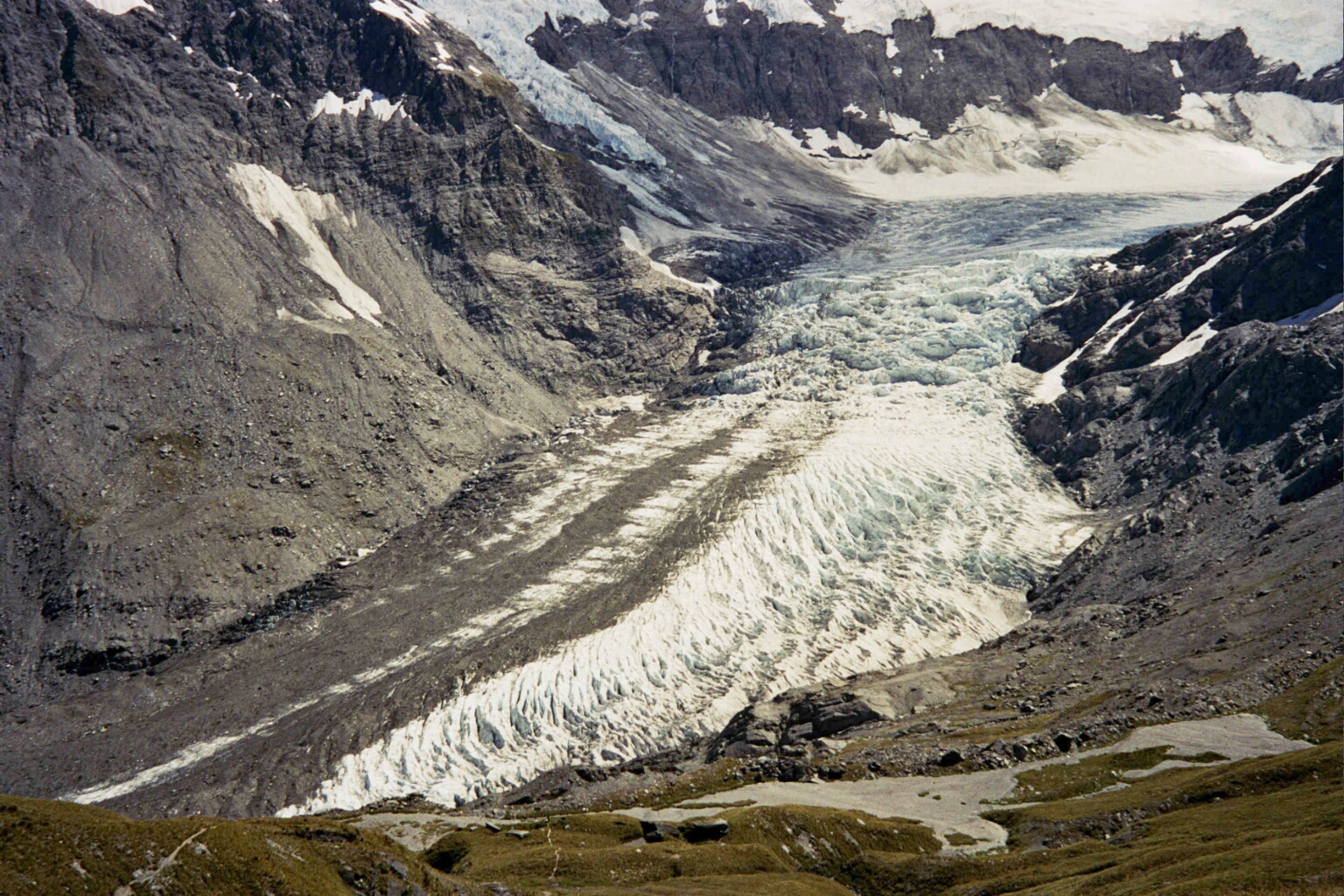
Dart Glacier (source of the Dart River)

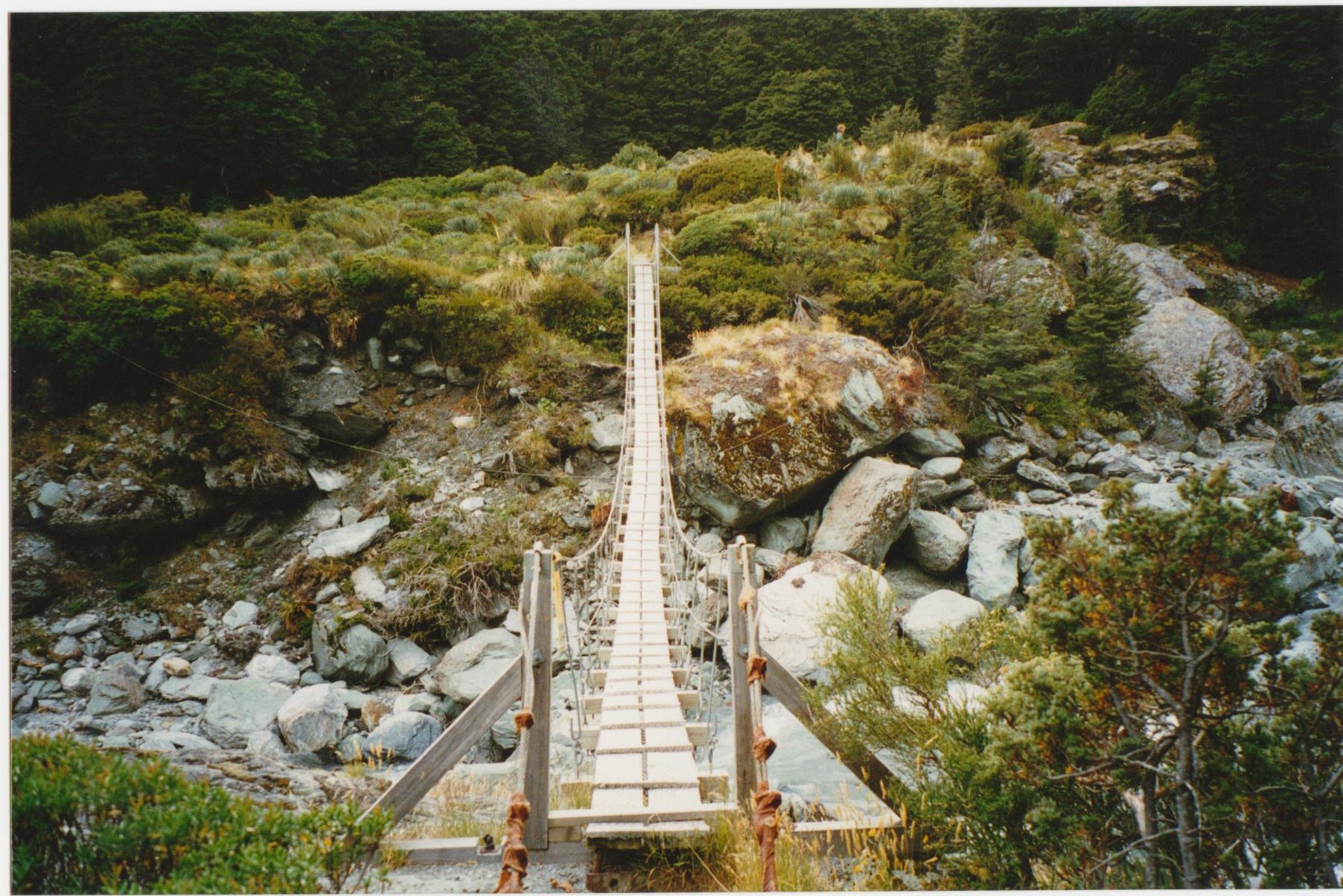
Suspension bridge over the upper Dart River in Otago New Zealand

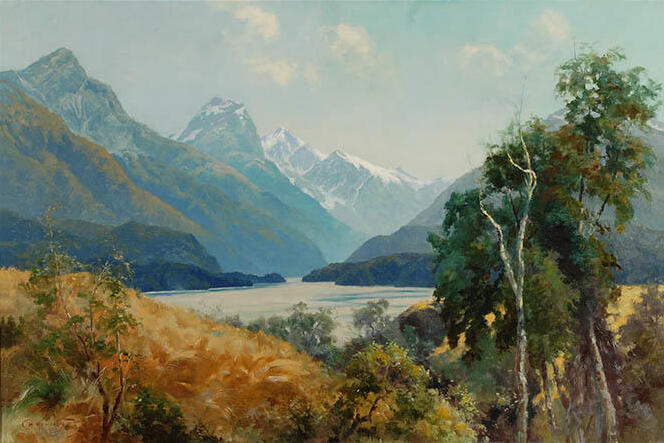
The Dart Valley, Wakatipu, from Paradise Valley by Charles Howorth; late 19th or early 20th century

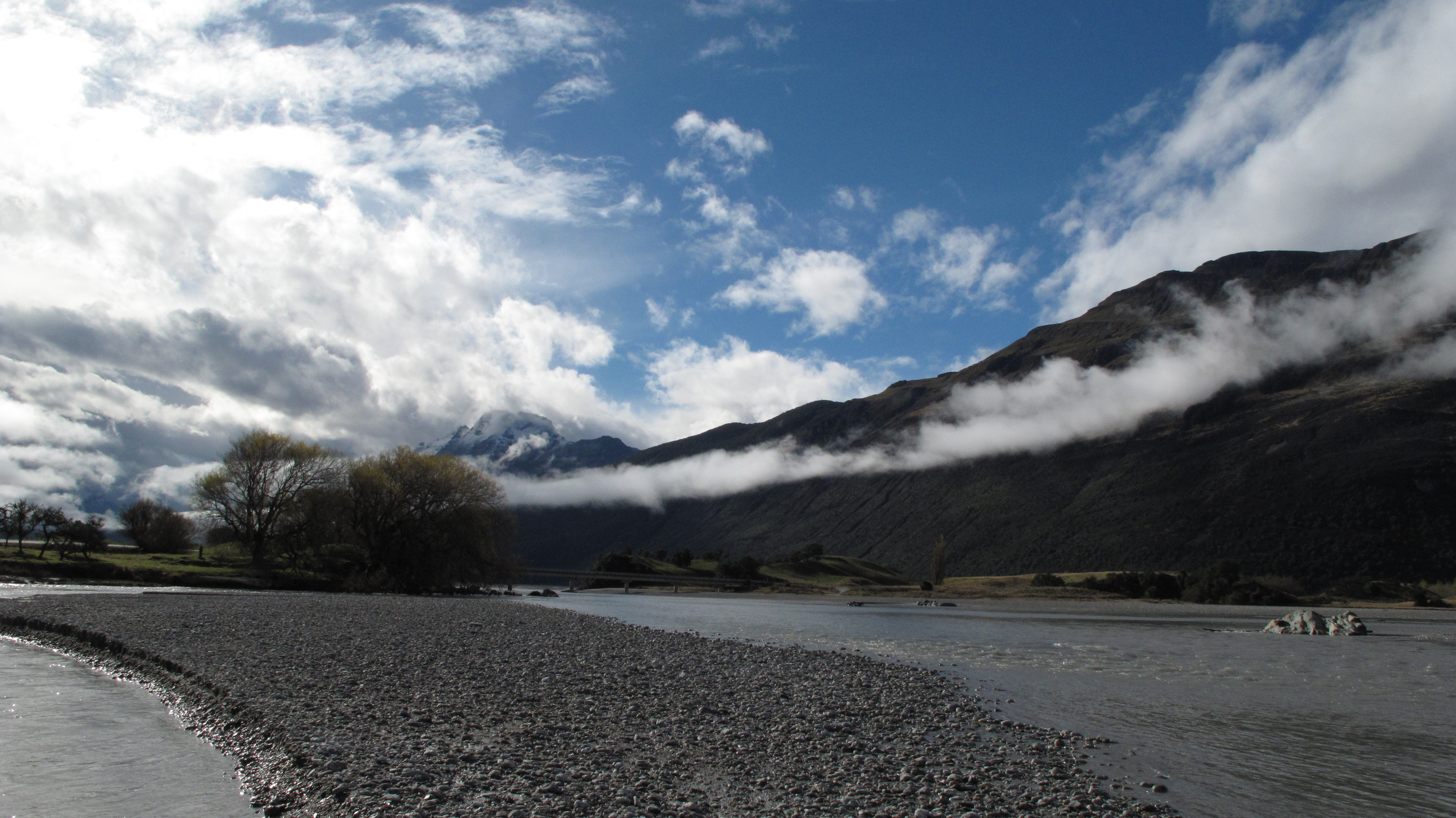
The Dart River near Glenorchy
