= Mount Aspiring National Park =

National park in New Zealand

- IUCN category II (national park)
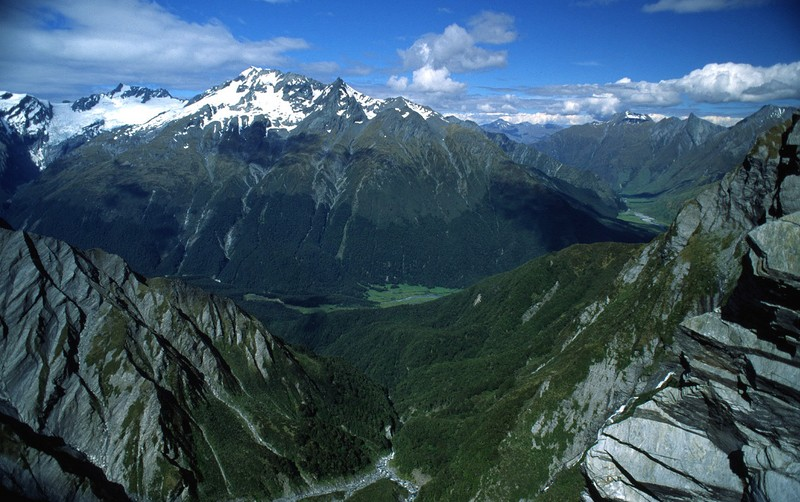
- West Matukituki Valley and the Matukituki River seen from Cascade Saddle
- Interactive map of Mount Aspiring National Park
- Nearest city: Wānaka
- Coordinates: 44°23′S 168°44′E
- Area: 3,562 km^{2} (1,375 sq mi)
- Established: 1964
- Governing body: Department of Conservation

UNESCO World Heritage Site
- Official name: Te Wāhipounamu – South West New Zealand
- Type: Natural
- Criteria: vii, viii, ix, x
- Designated: 1990 (14th session)
- Reference no.: 551
- Region: Oceania

Mount Aspiring National Park is in the Southern Alps of the South Island of New Zealand, north of Fiordland National Park, situated in Otago and Westland regions. The park forms part of the Te Wahipounamu World Heritage Site.

== History ==
Mount Aspiring National Park was established in 1964 as New Zealand's tenth national park.

=== Expansion ===
==== Landsborough Station addition ====
In April 2005 the Nature Heritage Fund purchased private land in the Landsborough River valley as an addition to the park.

==== Milford Sound tunnel proposal ====
In 2006, the Milford Dart Company asked the Department of Conservation to amend the Mt Aspiring National Park Management Plan to allow an additional road within the park for a bus tunnel, the so-called Milford Tunnel, from the Routeburn Road to the Hollyford Valley to take tourists to Milford Sound. The tunnel would have established a connection via Glenorchy and would have significantly reduced the current return travel time from Queenstown to Milford Sound of 9 hours.

In December 2007, the New Zealand Conservation Authority declined to adopt the amendment to the Management Plan. The Conservation Authority considered the proposed road would not add to the use and enjoyment of Mount Aspiring National Park and that the adverse effects of construction and use of the road in the National Park would outweigh any benefits.

The proposal gained approval in principle by the Department of Conservation in 2011, but was rejected by the Minister of Conservation, Nick Smith, in July 2013. Smith stated that "the proposal was beyond what was appropriate for a World Heritage Area." The managing director of the company behind the proposal stated that he was "disappointed of course. National trying to out-green the greens. Going skiing."

=== Recent history ===
==== Mining proposal ====
In 2009 the National-led government of New Zealand indicated that Mount Aspiring National Park may be opened up to mining. Around 20% of the total area of the park, mainly in the western portions around the Red Hill Range, and the north eastern parts, could be removed from the park and mined. Prospectors here are particularly interested in carbonatite deposits including rare earth elements and tungsten. The Green Party warned that the park is one of New Zealand's main tourism drawcards, and that mining here could do significant damage to the country's image.

== Geography ==
Mount Aspiring National Park covers 3,562 square kilometres (1,375 mi^{2}) at the southern end of the Southern Alps, directly to the west of Lake Wānaka, and is popular for tramping, walking and mountaineering. Mount Aspiring / Tititea, elevation 3,033 metres (9,951 ft) above sea level, gives the park its name. Other prominent peaks within the park include Mount Pollux, elevation 2,542 metres (8,340 ft), and Mount Brewster, elevation 2,519 metres (8,264 ft).

The Haast Pass, one of the three principal road routes over the Southern Alps, crosses the north-eastern corner of the park.

=== Glaciers ===
Mount Aspiring is still home to over 100 glaciers, that contributed to the formation of the valleys in the national park. U-shaped valleys with steep sides can be found throughout Mount Aspiring National Park, which was formed through glaciation in the region 16,000 –18,000 years ago during the Ōtira Ice Age.

== Conservation and human interaction ==
=== Visitor centre ===
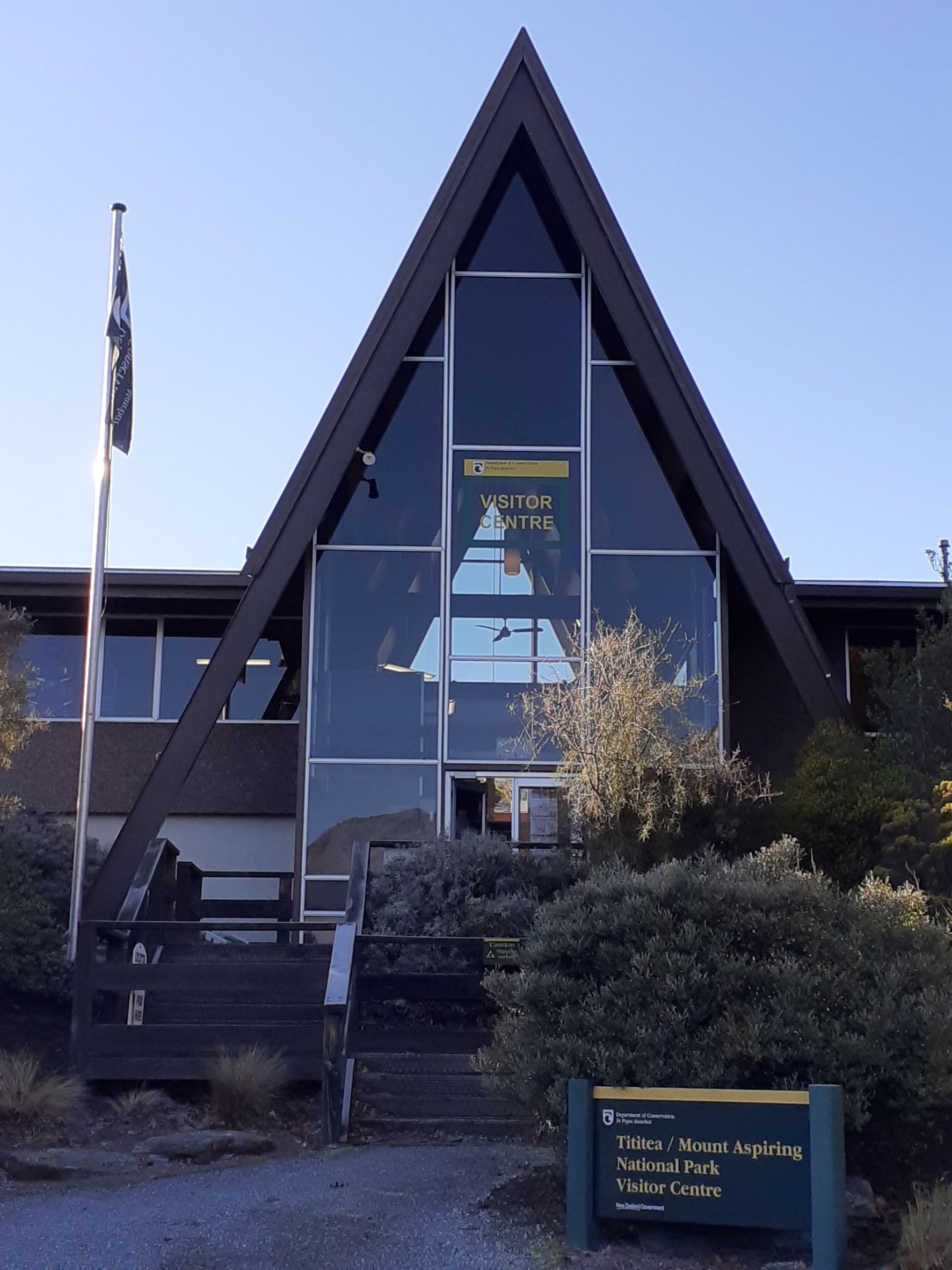
Mt Aspiring Visitor Centre (July 2021)

The Mount Aspiring National Park visitor centre is located in Wānaka on the Corner of Ardmore St and Ballentyne Rd.

=== Activities ===
Popular tramping and hiking tracks in the park include:

- Cascade Saddle Track
- Gillespie Pass circuit
- Matukituki Valley
- Routeburn Track
- Rees and Dart Tracks

== See also ==
- National parks of New Zealand
- Forest parks of New Zealand
- Regional parks of New Zealand
- Protected areas of New Zealand
- Conservation in New Zealand
- Tramping in New Zealand
