= Hiking in New Zealand =

Recreational activity involving walking over rough country

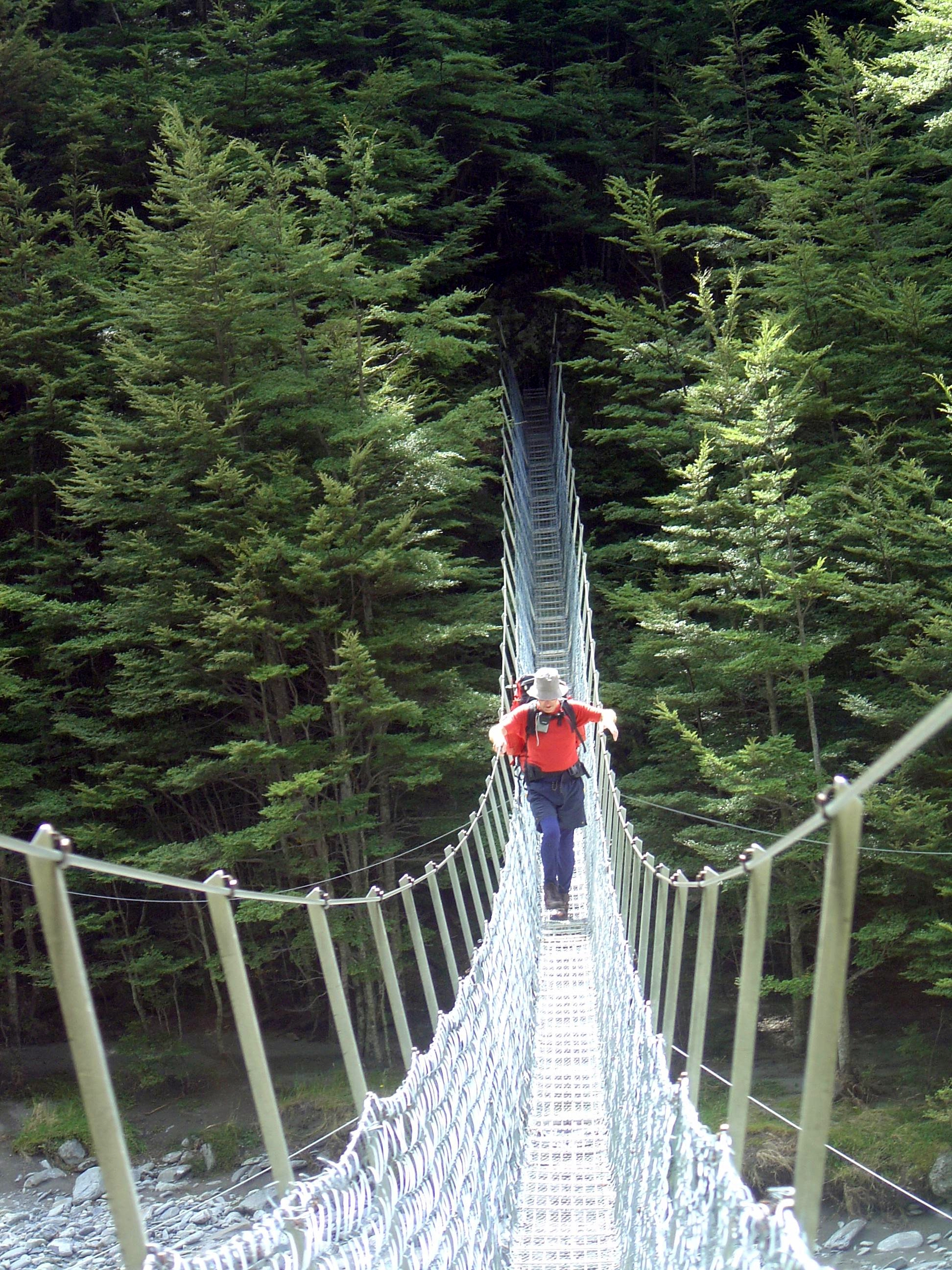
A tramper crossing a swingbridge over the Huxley River in the South Island of New Zealand

Tramping, known elsewhere as backpacking, rambling, hill walking or bushwalking, is a popular activity in New Zealand.

Tramping is defined as a recreational activity involving walking over rough country. Trampers often carry a backpack and wet-weather gear, and may also carry equipment for cooking and sleeping.

== History ==
Alpine climbing has been a recreational activity from the early days of European settlement, and possibly earlier. From the 1950s tracks, huts and bridges were built in the forested areas of New Zealand to support hunters culling introduced deer species which had become a threat to the biodiversity of New Zealand. As tramping became popular these facilities were increasingly used by trampers. In later years tramping has become popular for both local and foreign tourists.

Tramping clubs were formed in many towns, cities and universities with regular trips being organised. The clubs sometimes own a bus to transport club members to the tracks.

== Tramping tracks ==
A network of tramping tracks has been developed throughout New Zealand of varying lengths and difficulties. A small number of tramping tracks cross private land either in part or in full. All of the major tramping tracks are on public land that is administered by the Department of Conservation.

Among the best-known tracks are the eleven Great Walks and the ultra-long-distance Te Araroa.

== Huts ==
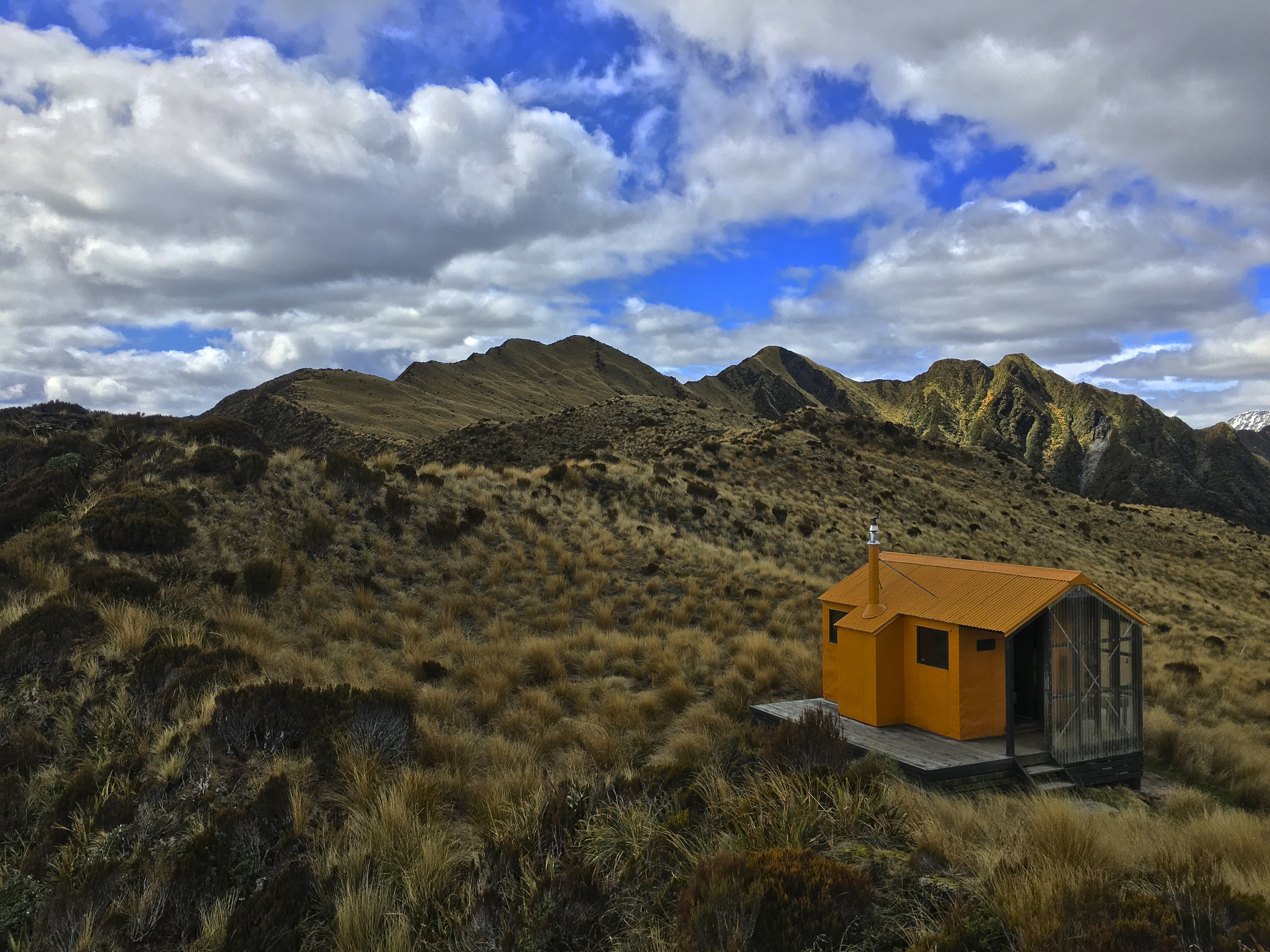
Mt Brown Hut, Lake Kaniere Scenic Reserve, West Coast, New Zealand

There is a network of more than 950 backcountry huts throughout New Zealand operated by the Department of Conservation (DOC) on public land. DOC operates a programme of bookings, tickets, and passes to help fund the maintenance of these huts. Some areas have privately owned huts on public land used for commercial tourism operations. The majority of the huts were built by the now defunct New Zealand Forest Service for deer culling operations. Other huts were built by alpine clubs, schools, and ski clubs. Some of the buildings on public land that are readily accessible by vehicle, are generally "baches" or "cribs" built by private individuals when control of the use of public land was less stringent. These baches are not made available to the public. Some public huts are associated with a local club and volunteers from clubs will perform much of the maintenance on these huts. In the Tararua Forest Park north of Wellington huts are managed in a partnership between DOC and various lower North Island clubs. In the eastern Southern Alps near Christchurch, some huts are managed solely by the Canterbury Mountaineering Club and they rely on fees from these huts to help pay the cost of maintenance.

Amongst experienced trampers there is a strong culture of looking after huts. The phrase "hut etiquette" encompasses looking after any hut that is used and showing consideration for other hut users. Most huts on the conservation estate are open to the public and the state of a hut depends on the care by those who use it.

== Environmental care code ==
The Department of Conservation developed an environmental care code, a 10-point checklist to minimise the impact in the outdoors.

== See also ==
- National parks of New Zealand
- Forest parks of New Zealand
- Regional parks of New Zealand
- Protected areas of New Zealand
- Conservation in New Zealand
- Camping in New Zealand
