= New Zealand tramping tracks =

A Department of Conservation track marker - an orange triangular plastic pointer attached to trees and poles.

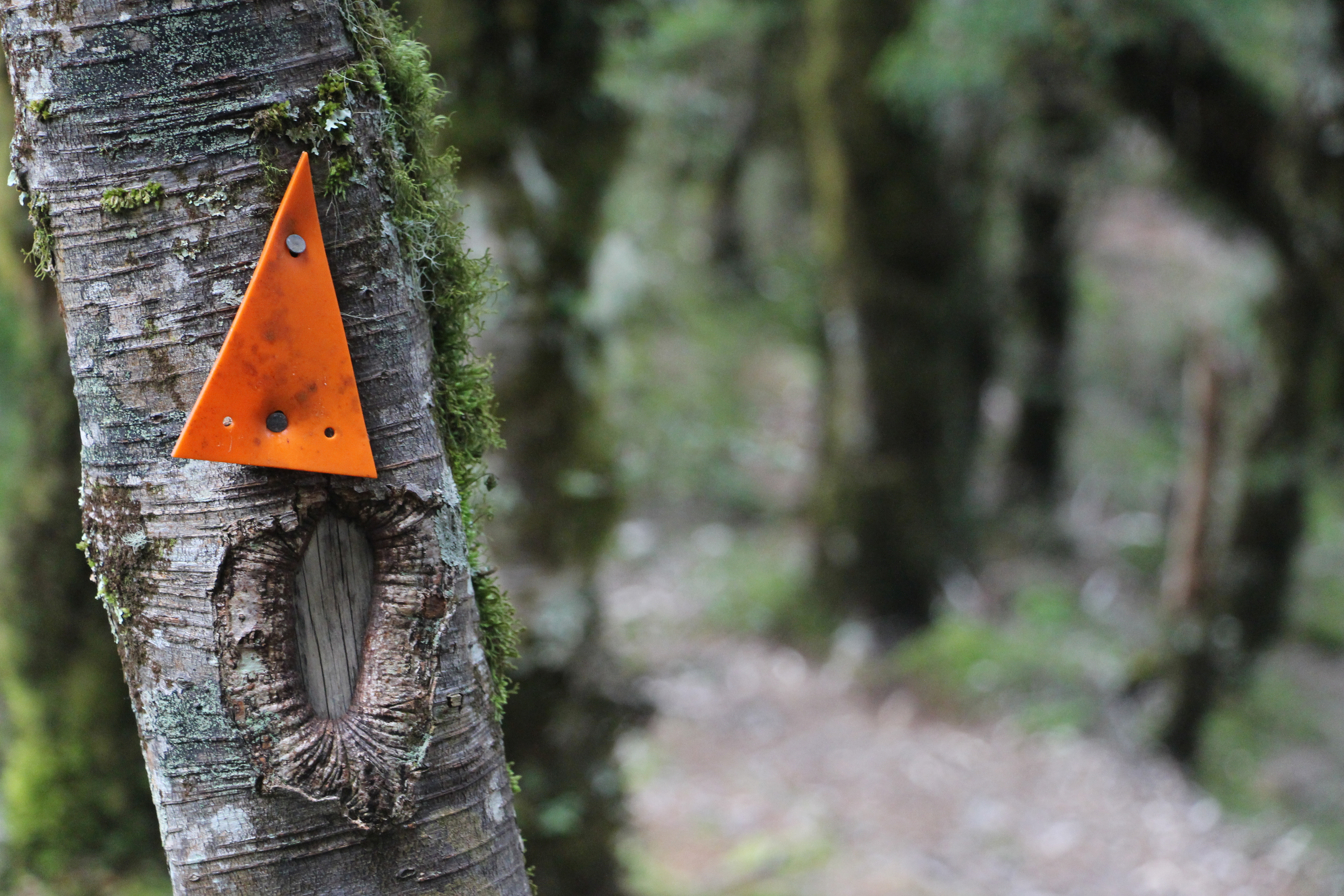
Track marker in Tararua Forest Park

In New Zealand, long distance walking or hiking for at least one overnight stay is known as tramping. There are a number of walkways in New Zealand, but most are relatively short and can be walked in a day or less. Many are also an easy walk, with well formed footpaths. However, some tracks require an overnight stay either because of the rugged country or the length of the track.

New Zealand has both public and private tramping tracks. Public tracks are managed by the Department of Conservation, Regional Councils or other authorities. They generally cross public land (including National Parks), or private land with negotiated public access. Access is free and in most cases unrestricted, although fees are payable for overnight stays in huts or camping.

Private tracks cross private land, with restricted fee-based access. Itineraries are generally fixed. Fees may cover things such as overnight accommodation, food and pack transportation.

== Notable tramping tracks ==
Some of the tramping tracks have acquired names, with the most popular being called the Great Walks (GW).

=== North Island ===
- The Hillary Trail
- The Lake Waikaremoana Great Walk, around Lake Waikaremoana in Te Urewera National Park (GW)
- The Pinnacles Walk/Kauaeranga Kauri Trail on Coromandel Peninsula
- Northern Crossing of Tararua Range in the Tararua Range
- Southern Crossing of Tararua Range in the Tararua Range
- Tongariro Alpine Crossing
- Tongariro Northern Circuit (GW)
- The Round the Mountain Track of Mount Ruapehu, informally known as the Ruapehu Circuit and the Tongariro Southern Circuit
- Te Araroa Trail
- Whanganui Journey (GW)
- The Cape Brett Lighthouse walk

=== South Island ===
- Abel Tasman Coast Track (GW) and Abel Tasman Inland Track in Abel Tasman National Park
- Avalanche Peak Track
- Banks Track (private)
- Cascade Saddle Track
- Copland Track
- Dusky Track
- George Sound Route
- Greenstone and Caples Tracks
- Haast to Paringa Cattle Track
- Heaphy Track (GW)
- Hollyford Track
- Hump Ridge Track
- Kaikoura Coast Track (private)
- Kaikoura Wilderness Walk (private)
- Kepler Track (GW)
- Milford Track (GW)
- Mingha-Deception
- Otago Central Rail Trail
- Queen Charlotte Track
- Rees and Dart Tracks
- Roberts Point Track
- Routeburn Track (GW)
- South Coast Track
- St James Walkway
- Travers-Sabine Circuit
- Wangapeka Track
- Te Araroa

=== Other islands ===
- Rakiura Track (GW), Stewart Island/Rakiura
- North-West Circuit
- Southern Circuit

== See also ==
- Camping in New Zealand
- List of rail trails#New Zealand
