= Adkin =

Adkin is an English surname derived from a diminutive form for Adam. Notable people with the surname include:

- George Leslie Adkin (1888–1964), New Zealand farmer, geologist, archaeologist and photographer
- William Adkin (born 1990), English cricketer
- Nancy Adkin (1916–1964), New Zealand artist

== See also ==
- Adkins
