= New Zealand Standard 5465:2001 =

The New Zealand Standard 5465:2001 - Self-containment of motor caravans and caravans specifies the requirements for water supply, sanitary plumbing and drainage installation, and solid waste containment in motor caravans and caravans for the purpose of obtaining a self-containment certificate.

In 2011 the New Zealand Parliament passed the Freedom Camping Act, which gives local councils and authorities the power to ban freedom camping in some, but not all, areas. The New Zealand Parliament introduced the freedom camping act because some tourists disposed of human waste inappropriately where they were camping. The Act does not include Certified Self Containment even though attempts were made to include it. The reasoning is because the Standard is only applicable to a minority of Freedom campers as determined by the Act and that the NZStandard fails to comply with the bill of Rights Act.

In places where freedom camping is permitted, local councils may only allow vehicles that are certified as self-contained to camp there, though that breaches Bill of Rights requirements. After all you can not teach a non-person object to be responsible. Unfortunately placing the emphasis on the camping vehicle rather than the persons has been found wanting.

Motorhomes, campervans or caravans have to undertake an inspection and the vehicle has to meet the New Zealand Standard NZS 5465:2001 in order to become certified. Being "certified" self-contained requires having the equipment on board to remove any waste generated in a freedom camping designated area for a period of 3 days therefore alienating the majority of Freedom Campers as defined in legislation, as well as locals wanting a night at the local beach.

For many, simply being 'self contained' without certification is sufficient - that being the simple ability to retain waste until proper facilities for disposal are available. Inspections are made by plumbers and some RV businesses.

New Zealand's camping rules are monitored by the local authorities and fines can be levied for camping in an area where it is prohibited, though the Freedom camping act prohibits blanket bans or even allocation of specific camping sites. The Act allows camping anywhere, unless an area is specifically prohibited to;

1. Protect the area
2. Protect access to the area
3. Protect the health and safety of those visiting the area.

These reasons for restriction are taken directly from the Bill of Rights Act.

As of May 2020 only 1/3 (33%) of NZ Councils require Certified self containment.{683744672424411}

In 2020 the Self Containment Standard and it use by Private organizations came under Investigation by Internal Affairs, Commerce Commission and others. The conclusion was that the Self Containment Standard was without legal substance and unable to be enforced in law. Much of the reasoning for the failure to be included in the Freedom Camping Bill was given as to why. Six months after the Freedom Camping Act was passed into law, the Ministry for the Environment ceased their role as the administrator, due to not being needed.

Since 2011 the NZStandard is only meant as a guideline and more specifically for Motorhome Clubs use, in order to meet the conditions of the Resource Consents and Camp-Ground Regulation exemptions granted for their own properties.

Since Ministry for the Environment ceased as administrator Motor-home Clubs, whose members required compliance with the standard, are able to appoint their own inspectors and issue the required certification themselves.
