= New Zealand Great Walks =

Set of tramping tracks

Map of the Great Walks of New Zealand

The New Zealand Great Walks are a set of popular tramping tracks developed and maintained by the Department of Conservation. They are New Zealand's premier tracks, through areas of some of the best scenery in the country, ranging from coastlines with beaches to dense rain forests and alpine terrain. The tracks are maintained to a high standard, making it easier for visitors to explore some of the most scenic parts of New Zealand's backcountry.

The walks range from 32 kilometres (20 mi) length to 82 kilometres (51 mi) in length and take between 3 and 6 days to complete, with the Whanganui Journey on river being 145 kilometres (90 mi) long over 5 days.

The Tongariro Northern Circuit, Hump Ridge Track and the Kepler Track are loop walks, all other Great Walks require transport to return to the starting point.

== History ==
The Great Walks network was established by the Department of Conservation in 1992. The network was established both as a way to advertise hiking in New Zealand, but also as a means of managing and conserving the most popular tracks which were increasingly being damaged by unrestricted tourism.

Seven of the walks are covered by Google Street View from November 2015.

== Facilities ==
The backcountry huts are conveniently located, comfortable, well-equipped, and high capacity. Both the huts and tracks on the Great Walks are of a higher standard than other tramping tracks in the country. These tracks are very popular with overseas visitors, partly due to their heavy promotion by the Department of Conservation and tourism operators. All of the Great Walks have booking systems to manage visitor pressure. Guided walks are available through private operators along many of the walks.

There is no charge required for walking access to the Great Walks, however, charges apply for overnight accommodation at the huts or campsites. To conserve the tracks, it is illegal to camp within 500 metres (1,600 ft) of a Great Walk track or 1 kilometre (0.62 mi) of the Milford Track except at designated campsites. Sections of the Abel Tasman Coastal Track are particularly popular for day walks without overnight accommodation, as even the middle sections are serviced by water taxis.

== List of routes ==
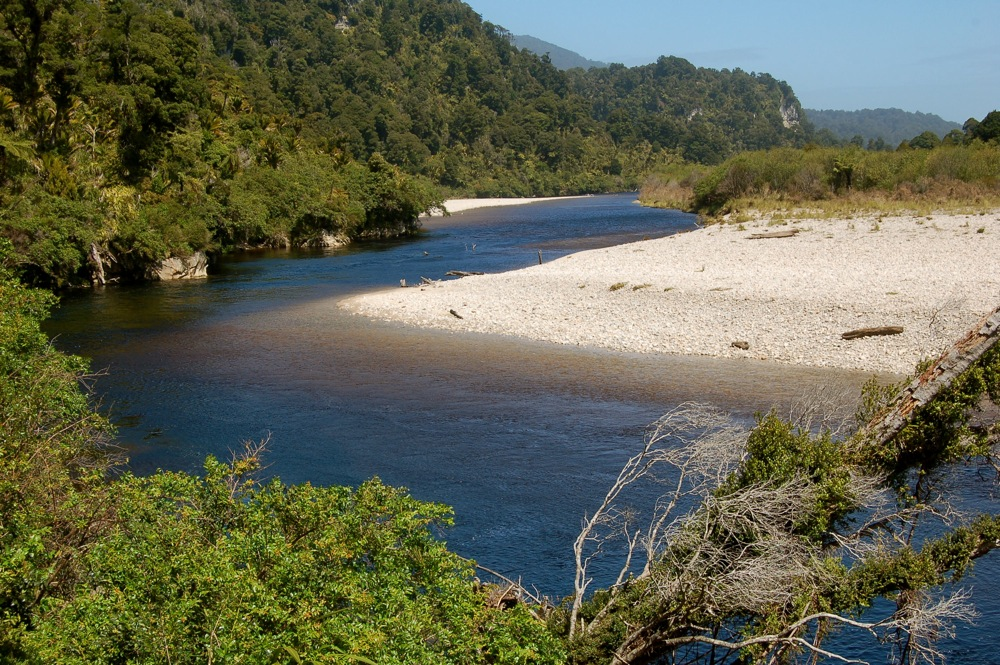
Sub-tropical vegetation along Heaphy River

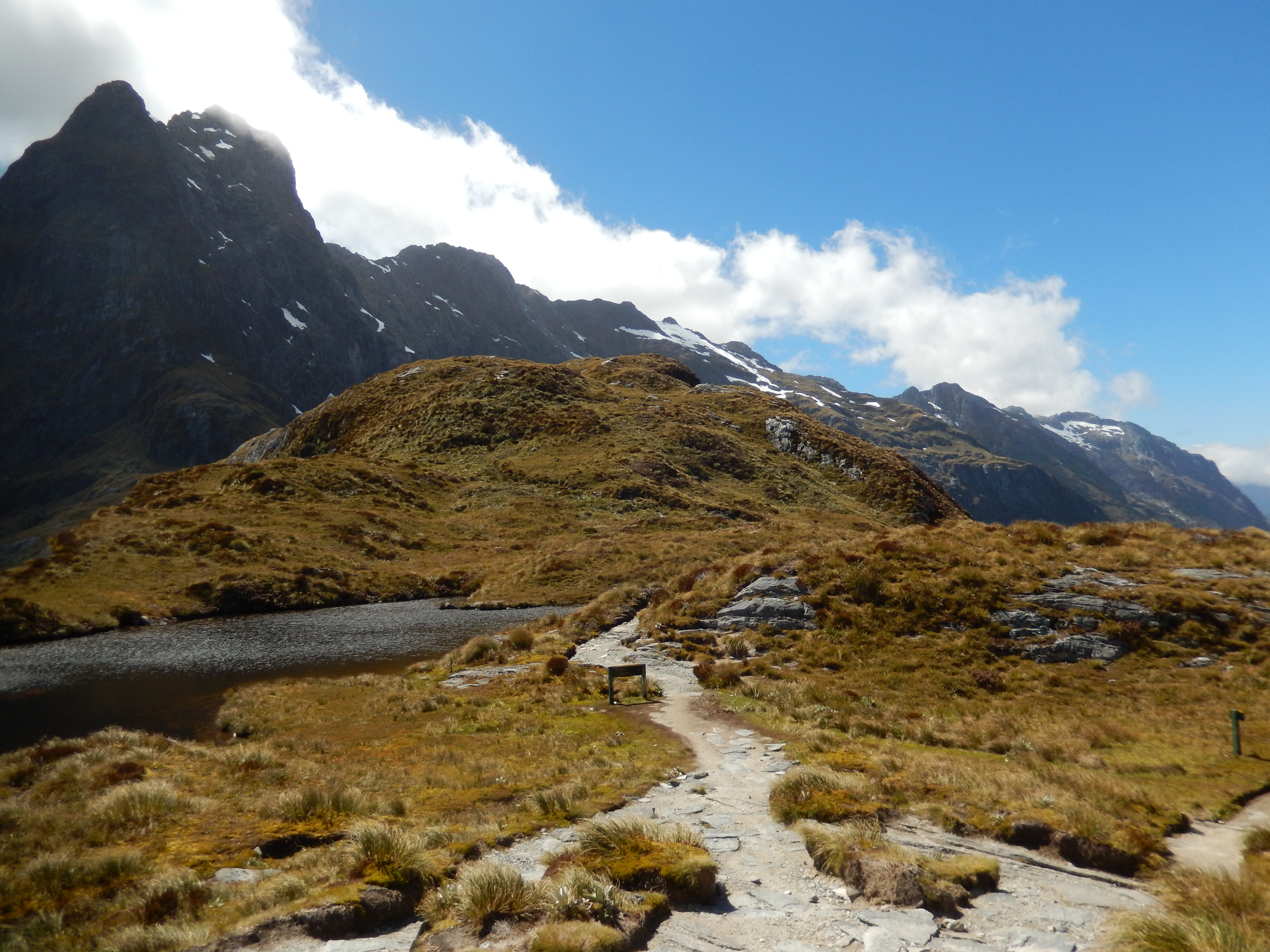
Mountain pass on Milford Track

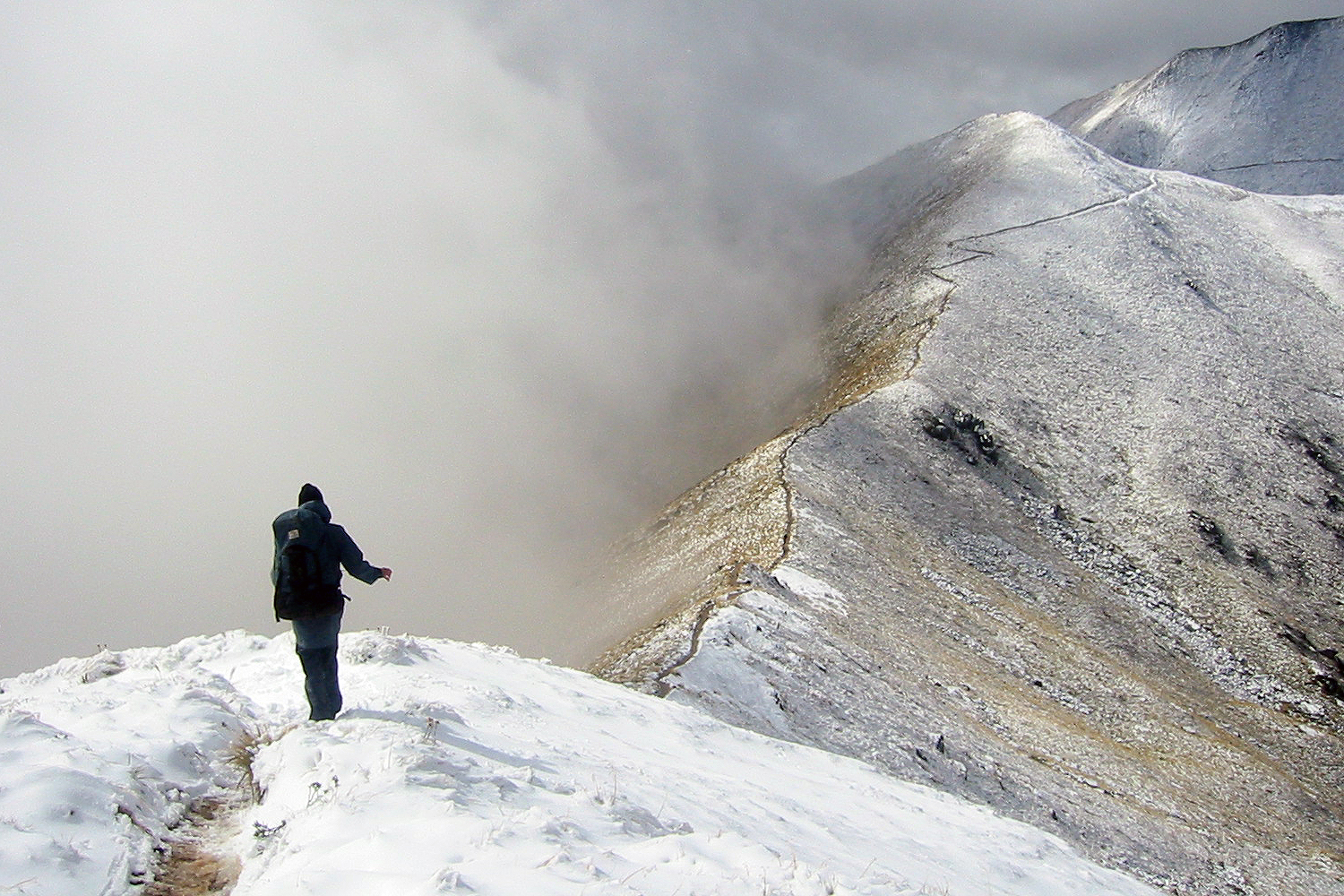
An alpine section of the Kepler Track after snowfall

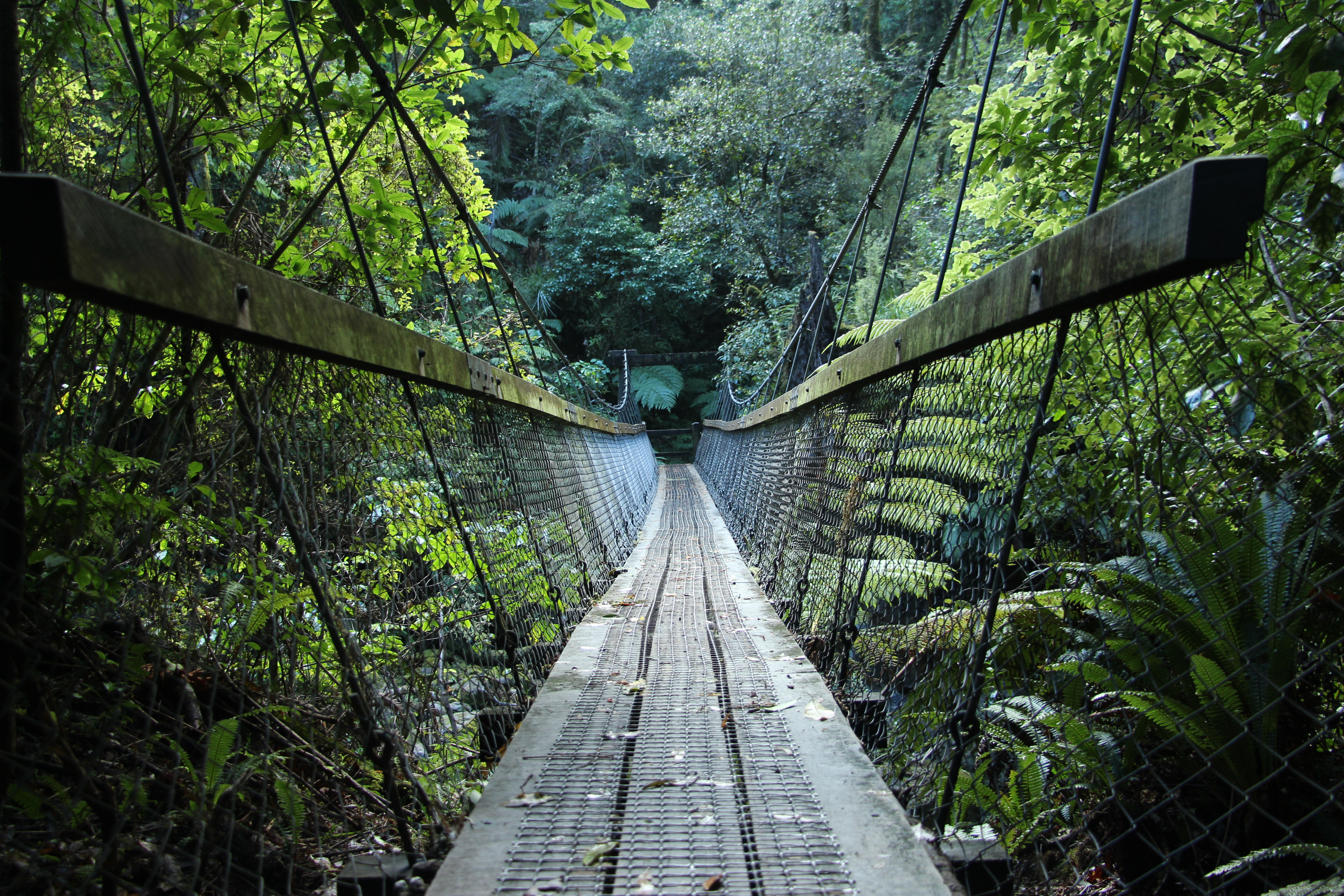
Typical swing bridge on Waikaremoana Great Walk

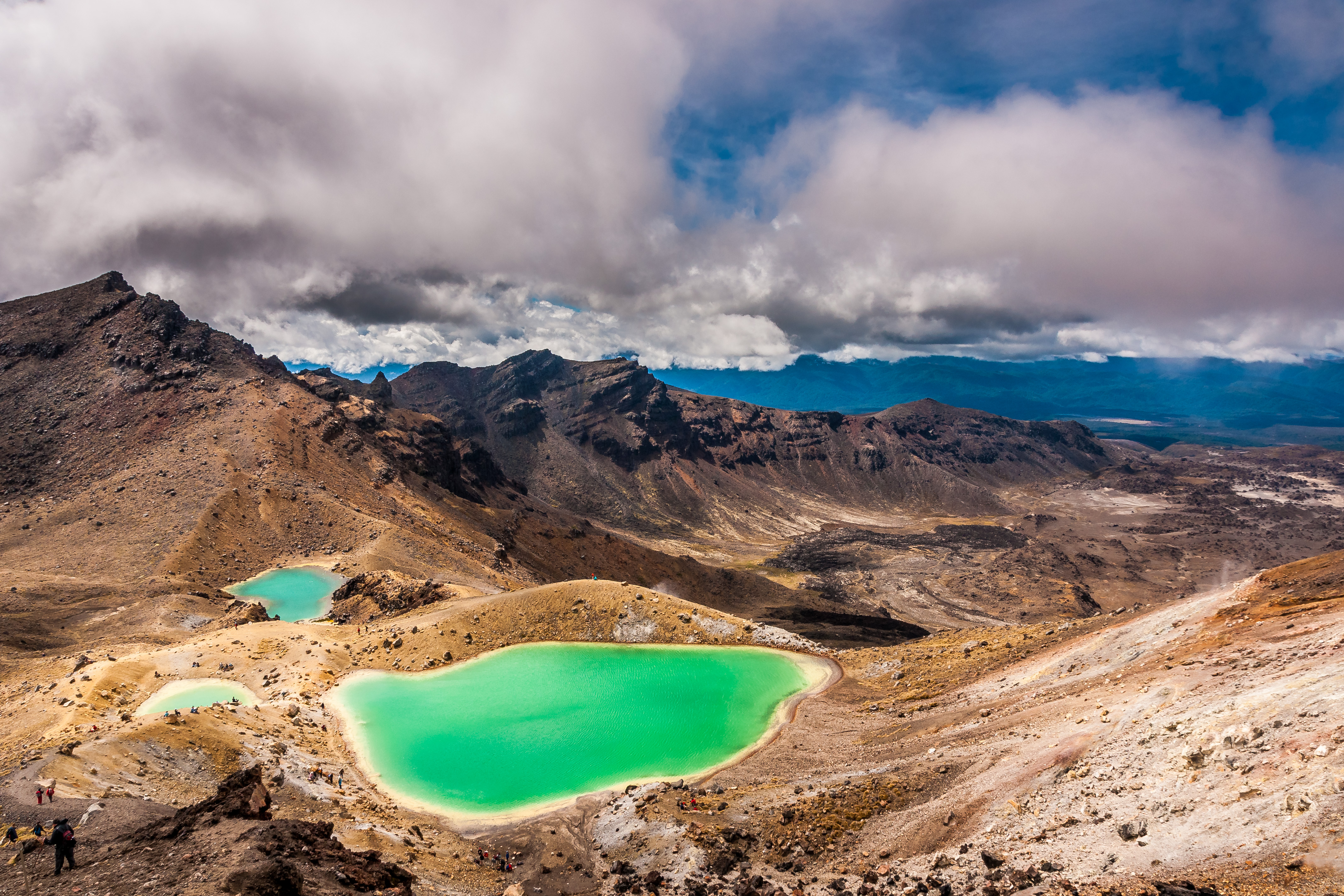
Emerald Lakes in the volcanic landscape of Tongariro

North Island

- Lake Waikaremoana Great Walk
- Tongariro Northern Circuit – the second day of the circuit follows the Tongariro Alpine Crossing over volcanic terrain.
- Whanganui Journey — this is actually not a walk but a canoe voyage on New Zealand's longest navigable river. It is however managed under the Great Walks system.

South Island

- Abel Tasman Coast Track – the most popular track.
- Heaphy Track – at 82 kilometres the longest of the walking tracks, delivering the biggest contrast from palm-fringed beaches to sub-alpine tussock grasslands.
- Routeburn Track – at 32 kilometres the shortest of the walking tracks.
- Milford Track – the most famous of the Great Walks.
- Paparoa Track and Pike29 Memorial Track – 55 km track
- Kepler Track
- Hump Ridge Track in coastal Southland

Stewart Island / Rakiura

- Rakiura Track

== Expansion ==
In 2018, the Department of Conservation investigated the addition of an eleventh Great Walk with the finalists being:

- Te Paki Coastal Track in Northland
- Queen Charlotte Track in the Marlborough Sounds
- Hump Ridge Track in coastal Southland

In July 2019, it was decided that the 61-km Hump Ridge Track would become the 11th Great Walk. There was an upgrade to track and hut facilities, costing approx NZ$5m. The goal was to have this track join the Great Walks network in 2023. but after delays it opened as a Great Walk on 25 October 2024.

== See also ==
- Tramping in New Zealand
- New Zealand tramping tracks
- List of rail trails#New Zealand
- New Zealand Cycle Trail – originally conceived as single route, this is now to become a 'Great Rides' system analogous to the Great Walks.
- Protected areas of New Zealand
