= Google Street View in Oceania =

In Oceania, Google Street View is available in most parts of Australia and New Zealand.

On 4 August 2008, the long-anticipated image collection of Australia was introduced. At this time, 18 camera icons were added. Extensive mapping of New Zealand was included on 1 December 2008. On 9 December 2008, Darwin, Australia, and other locations were included. On 30 October 2009, Google Australia announced that they would be sending its fleet of cars back on the road from November 2009 to update Street View in Australia with new images.

In June 2010, Google Street View ceased operations in Australia after its Street View cars were found to have been collecting Wi-Fi data from home Wi-Fi networks. In May 2011, Google Australia stated that they had removed all the Wi-Fi sniffing equipment and that they planned to shoot Australian roads again, but did not provide a specific timetable. Driving did not recommence in Australia until 2013. On 27 July 2011, major urban and regional centres of Australia were updated with the new HD imagery.

In February 2015 another update of Australia with HD imagery was released, as part of the first update in Northern Territory after the low-resolution imagery. It also affected parts of Western Australia and Queensland. However, some places still have only low-resolution imagery or don't even have Street View coverage at all. As of July 2024, the updates of Australia footage are ongoing, with most areas now having high-quality, recent imagery.

== Timeline of introductions ==
Date	Major locations added
August 2008	(Australia) Adelaide, Albany, Alice Springs, Brisbane, Broken Hill, Cairns, Canberra, Geraldton, Hobart, Karratha, Melbourne, Mount Isa, Perth, Rockhampton, Sydney, Tamworth, Wagga Wagga and more rural areas
December 2008	Major part of New Zealand More areas in Australia
July 2011	Update with HD images in various locations in Australia
June 2011	(Japan) Bonin Islands
October 2011	Full introduction of Google Business Views, including new businesses in New Zealand
February 2012	Update with HD images in various locations in New Zealand
April 2012	Art Gallery of New South Wales, National Gallery of Australia, in Australia
September 2012	Underwater imagery in Australia and Hawaii (United States)
November 2012	Luna Park Sydney, Taronga Zoo, in Australia
September 2013	Updated areas, including Christchurch and Auckland, and more locations in New Zealand
December 2013	Adamstown, Henderson Island in Pitcairn Islands
March 2014	(Australia) Cockatoo Island
September 2014	Unincorporated territories of the United States including: Hagåtña and more locations in Guam; Capitol Hill, Saipan, Garapan and more locations in the Northern Mariana Islands
February 2015	Update and more locations in Australia
March 2015	Queensland Museum, Australian War Memorial, National Museum of Australia, National Portrait Gallery, Powerhouse Museum, Australian Centre for the Moving Image and Public Record Office Victoria in Australia
May 2015	Pago Pago, Fagatogo, Tafuna, Ofu-Olosega, Manu'a and more locations in American Samoa
July 2015	Update and more locations in Australia, including HD update of Alice Springs.
November 2015	Milford Track, Kepler Track, Abel Tasman Coast Track, Lake Waikaremoana Great Walk, Heaphy Track, Routeburn Track, Rakiura Track in New Zealand
December 2015	Some beaches from Australia: Manly Beach, Bondi Beach, Bronte Beach, Hyams Beach, Byron Bay, Shelly Beach
April 2016	(Australia) Sydney Opera House
May 2016	(Australia) Cape Willoughby Conservation Park & Flinders Chase National Park
June 2016	(Australia) Mount Ainslie Lookout & National Arboretum Canberra
July 2016	Australia: (South Australia) Adelaide Botanic Garden & Adelaide Zoo; (Australian Capital Territory) Bruce Ridge Nature Reserve; (New South Wales) Georges River near the Sydney Coast
September 2016	(Australia) Namadgi National Park

== Areas included ==
=== American Samoa ===
Most towns, cities, villages, major and rural roads.

=== Australia ===
Most towns, cities, villages, major and rural roads.

=== Ecuador ===
- Galapagos Islands: Some paths and some beach walks.

=== Guam ===
Most towns, cities, villages, major and rural roads.

=== Japan ===
- Bonin Islands
  - Chichi-jima – Most roads
  - Haha-jima – Most roads

For other parts of Japan, see Google Street View in Asia.

=== New Zealand ===
Most towns, cities, villages, major and sealed rural roads, and seven of the nine Great Walks hiking tracks.

=== Northern Mariana Islands ===
Most towns, cities, villages, major and rural roads.

=== Pitcairn Islands ===
Landmark coverage in Adamstown and Henderson Island.

=== United States ===
- Hawaii: Most towns, cities, villages, major and sealed rural roads.

=== Vanuatu ===
- Southeast Volcano Trek in Ambrym

== Countries without any coverage ==
Countries of Oceania which do not have coverage:

- Fiji
- Kiribati
- Marshall Islands
- Micronesia
- Nauru
- Palau
- Papua New Guinea
- Samoa
- Solomon Islands
- Tonga
- Tuvalu

All these countries have photospheres, 360 degree panorama photos similar to the streetview photos, accessible in Google maps, but they are either unofficially made by other companies or by singular people that are not associated with Google.

== Competing products ==
- New Zealand: EveryScape provides coverage for Christchurch.
