= Northern Crossing =

Northern Crossing may refer to:

- Northern Crossing (shopping mall), a shopping mall in Glendale, Arizona
- Northern Crossing (Tararua Range), a tramping/hiking track in New Zealand
