= Emerald Lakes =

- Ngā Rotopounamu (Māori)
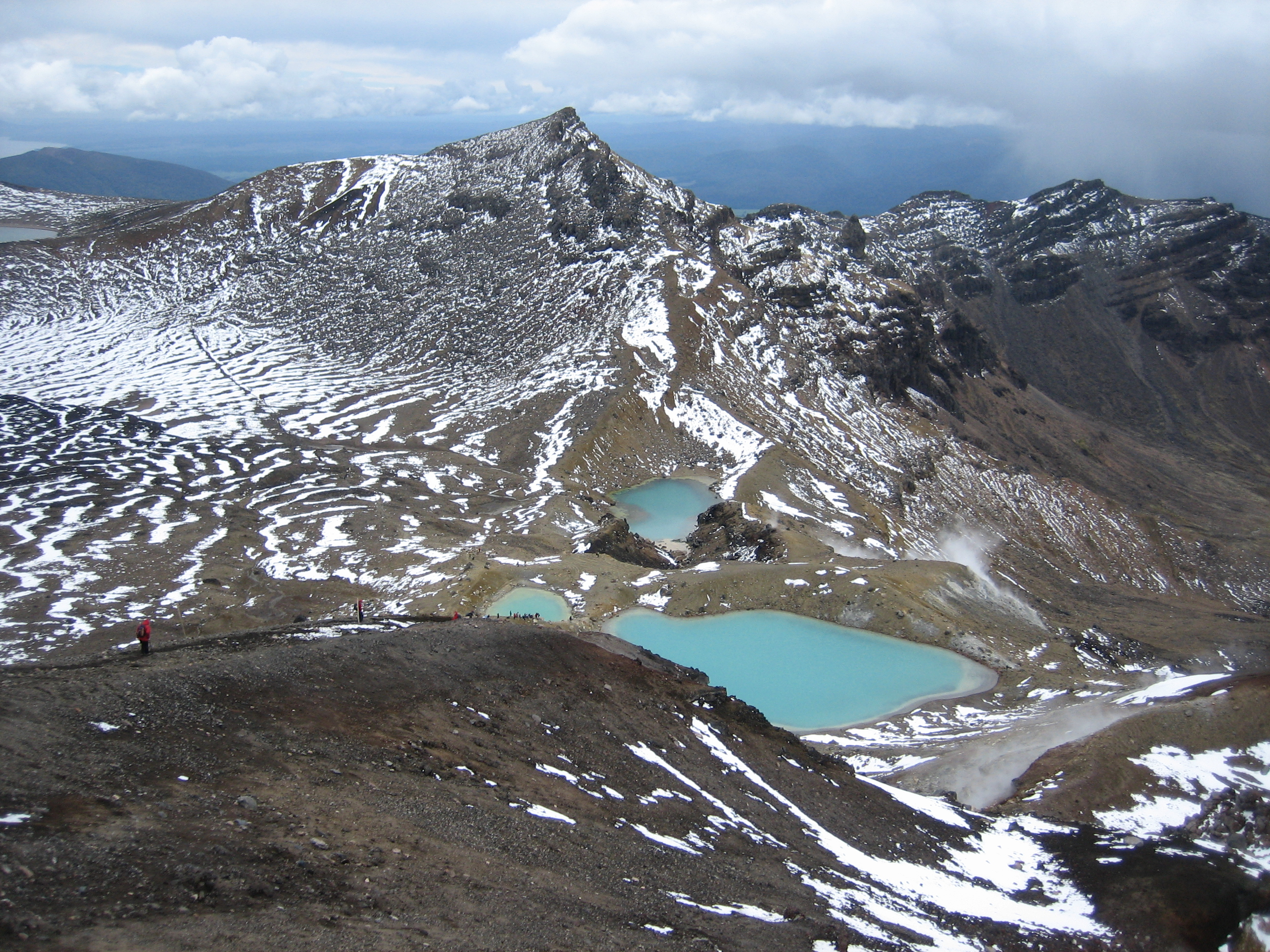
- Emerald Lakes from the Tongariro Alpine Crossing with summertime snow

- Location of the Emerald Lakes

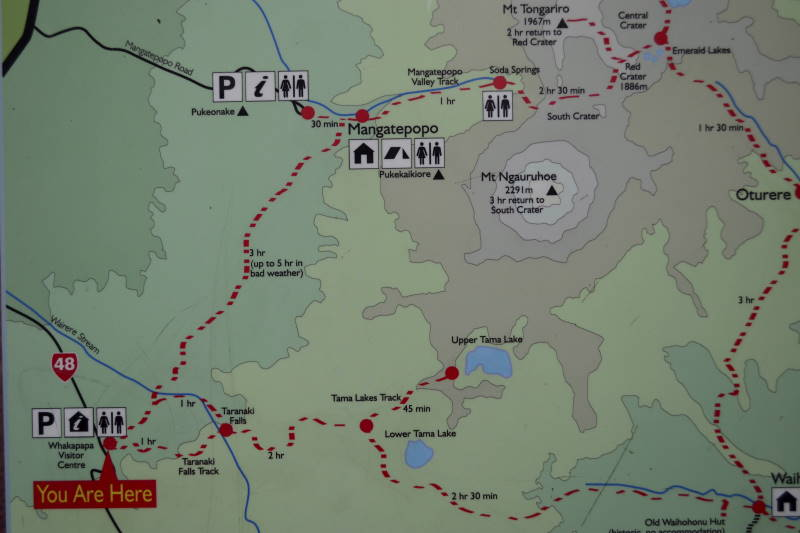
- Map of walking tracks around Tongariro National Park, with the Emerald Lakes to the northeast of Mount Ngauruhoe
- Location: Tongariro National Park
- Coordinates: 39.13444°S 175.65464°E
- Type: Volcanic crater lakes
- Surface elevation: 1,725 metres (5,659 ft)

The Emerald Lakes (Māori: Ngā Rotopounamu, lit. 'Pounamu-hued lakes') are a group of small lakes in Tongariro National Park, named for their distinctive colour. The lakes are the result of water filling explosion craters near the summit of Mount Tongariro, with the colour coming from minerals dissolved from the surrounding landscape, particularly calcium carbonate.

The lakes are visible to hikers on the Tongariro Alpine Crossing when they begin their descent from the highest point of that track, at an altitude of 1,886 metres (6,188 ft).

The lakes have previously been infested with Juncus bulbosus, invasive to New Zealand, however since 2019 the New Zealand Department of Conservation have sought to control the weed, which has decreased to undetectable levels due to this work.

== See also ==
- List of lakes of New Zealand
