= Roberts Point Track =

Tramping track in the West Coast, New Zealand

Coordinates: 43°25′07″S 170°10′51″E

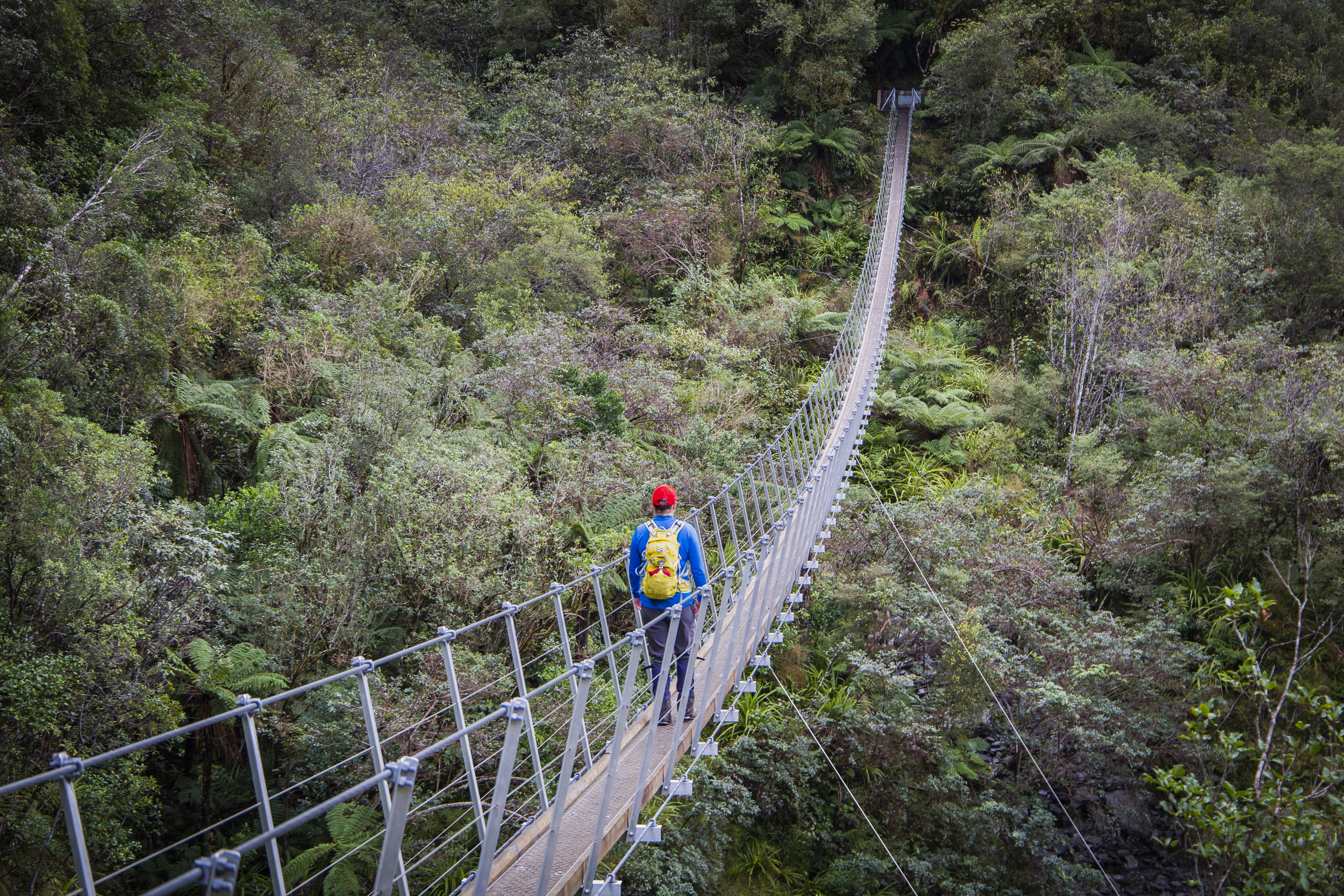
- Roberts Point Track
- Length: 11–12.3 km (6.8–7.6 mi)
- Location: Franz Josef Glacier & Westland Tai Poutini National Park, New Zealand
- Use: Tramping, trail running
- Difficulty: advanced
- Sights: Alpine views, rivers, waterfalls, cliffs
- Hazards: Hypothermia, ice, river
- Website: www.doc.govt.nz/parks-and-recreation/places-to-go/west-coast/places/westland-tai-poutini-national-park/things-to-do/tracks/roberts-point-track/

Roberts Point Track is an 11–12.3-kilometre tramping track in Franz Josef Glacier and Westland Tai Poutini National Park, New Zealand. It takes approximately 5 hours and 20 minutes to complete. Within the track are swing bridges, ice-carved rock, waterfalls, and sheer cliffs. After about an hour walk is Hende's Hut. It is classified by the Department of Conservation as an advanced track, requiring a "good level of fitness".

Roberts Point Track was constructed in 1907 with the purpose of providing tourists with a place to view the Franz Josef Glacier.

== Description ==
The track starts at the Douglas Bridge and goes up the east side of the Waiho Valley, which is over ice-carved rock. It goes over multiple side streams until it reaches a viewpoint above the glacial ice. After about an hour of walking, the track reaches Hende's Hut. Further on, the track goes to a suspension bridge crossing Rope Creek until it reaches Roberts Point further uphill.

Roberts Point Track is named after George J. Roberts (1848–1910), who was the Chief Surveyor and Commissioner of Crown Lands for the Westland District. It was the first built in the Waiho Valley. Hende's Hut, a corrugated iron structure with a chimney and no windows, was built in 1906 under supervision from local blacksmith Peter Hende, for use as a manufacturing forge. Steelwork produced in the forge was used in the construction of a walkway in the track, now known as Hende's Gallery, which hangs off iron bars driven into the rock. It was built by men hanging from ropes or cages. Originally there were two separate sections. The section currently used is the higher one, as two years after construction completed, the lower section was swept away by glacier movement. It was restored by the Department of Conservation in 1996 and given a Historic Places Category 1 listing in 1994.

The Douglas Bridge is not original, the original one was built by Peter Hende. It was a 144-metre-long (472 ft) suspension bridge with a timber frame and hardwood towers on each end. The current bridge was built in 1936 and was restored in 1994 to the original plans. In 1913 Defiance Hut was built.

In 2020 Stuff described the track as one of New Zealand's "best secret spots". In 2010, the body of a Korean man was discovered. It was believed that he wandered off Roberts Point Track and fell to his death. In 2021, two tourists drowned in the Waiho River after ignoring warning signs and attempting to cross it. After their deaths, the Department of Conservation website added difficulty to the track, and details on the track was removed from a map as it did not explain its difficulty. Additionally, the Department of Conservation started considering moving the track near the river. In May 2018, a German tourist walked on the track alone without a map or compass in unsafe weather and rising water levels, despite other trampers urging her to turn back. She later called for help using her cellphone and a search team found her at 7:30 pm with hypothermia.
