= New Zealand Motor Caravan Association =

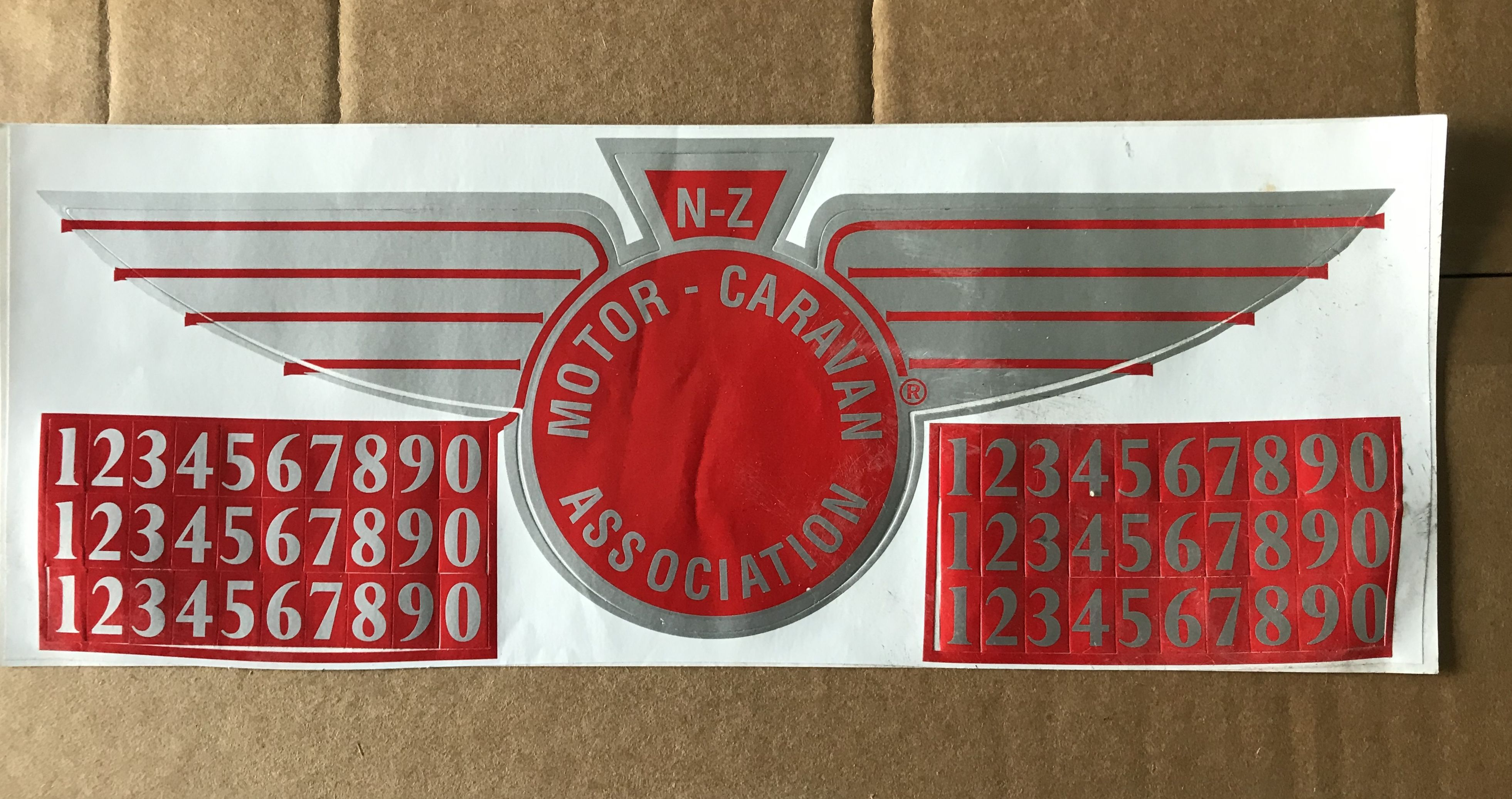
Membership sticker

The New Zealand Motor Caravan Association Inc (NZMCA) is a membership-based organisation representing the interests of private motorhome and caravan owners in New Zealand. Formed in 1956, member benefits include discounts on services and products, free and low-cost overnight sites, a dedicated insurance scheme and a range of publications & digital resources. Membership is restricted to permanent New Zealand residents and only those overseas residents who are current financial members of a kindred club in their home country. All members' vehicles must be certified as self-contained and prominently display the distinctive NZMCA winged logo.

The NZMCA engages with territorial authorities on provisions for freedom camping, based on the Freedom Camping Act 2011. It claims that Queenstown-Lakes District Council has effectively banned freedom camping, in contravention of the law, and after engaging 17 times with QLDC over a ten-year period, lodged proceedings in the High Court in March 2021. The following month, the NZMCA announced that they would take Marlborough District Council to the High Court over similar issues.
