= Northern Crossing (Tararua Range) =

Hiking trail in New Zealand

Coordinates: 40.6604°S 175.3587°E

- The Arete Hut area in the Tararua Range
- Length: 50 kilometres (31 mi)
- Location: Tararua Forest Park
- Use: Hiking
- Highest point: Mitre, 1,571 m (5,154 ft)
- Maintainer: Department of Conservation
- Website: Tararua Northern Crossing

The Northern Crossing is a tramping track in New Zealand's Tararua Range. The track is approximately 50 kilometres (31 mi) long and typically takes between three and five days to complete. The crossing is suitable only for experienced trampers.

From west to east, the track starts near Levin. The entrance is from the Poads Road end carpark, over farmland for 1 km into bush entering the Tararua Forest Park. Then either uphill by Gable End Ridge track or (if favourable weather conditions allow and the river level is low. Note that river levels can change quickly) up the Ohau River to South Ohau Hut and then the steep uphill Yeates 500 track, to Te Matawai Hut (900m). Then continue eastward over Pukematawai (1438m), Arete (1505m) and nearby Arete Biv (shelter) then southward along the ridge and via Waiohine Pinnacles (1400m), Tarn Ridge Hut to Girdlestone (1546m).

From Girdlestone the eastward exit is: 1) continue south via Adkin 1460m, The Three Kings (North King 1535m, Middle King 1521m and South King 1531m), McGregor 1540m, Holdsworth 1470m, Powell Hut 1200m and then east to Holdsworth Lodge end carpark or 2) eastward via Brockett 1538m, Pukeamoamo / Mitre 1571m (which is the highest peak in the Tararua Forest Park), Mitre Flats, Mitre Flats Hut 350m and the track alongside the Waingawa River to The Pines end carpark.

Both the Holdsworth and Waingawa / The Pines exits are within 20 km by road to Masterton.

== History ==
In 1909 the first documented Northern Crossing from Levin to Masterton was completed between 13 and 19 February by Leslie Adkin and Ernest Samuel Lancaster. Their route started from Levin (Poads Road end carpark), up the Ohau River to the confluence of the North Ohau and South Ohau Rivers. They then went up Deception Spur and over the ridge to the Mangahao River. They climbed the ridge to Dundas (1499m) and went southward to Arete (1505m). After continuing south to the Waiohine Pinnacles and exiting eastward, they went along the Pinnacle Spur to the Waingawa River and Mitre Flats and out to Masterton.

In 1911, Leslie Adkin, Ernest Lancaster, and Harry Thompson completed the second documented Northern Crossing from 9 to 17 March. They started at Levin (Poads Road end carpark) and followed the 1909 route as far as the Waiohine Pinnacles. They then continued southward past Tarn Ridge, Girdlestone (1546m) and Pukeamoamo / Mitre (1571m), Mt Holdsworth (1470m), exiting to the east at Holdsworth Lodge and out to Masterton.

All three men—Adkin, Lancaster and Thompson—have peaks in the Tararua Range named after them. Adkin 1460m, Lancaster 1504m and Thompson 1448m were made official names by the NZ Geographic Board in July 2020.

On 26 February 2023 the Heritage Horowhenua Charitable Trust included Adkin & Lancaster into their Walk of Fame and both now have plaques of commemoration on Oxford Street, Levin.

== Track description ==
The track is mostly unformed with steep, muddy or rocky sections and requires good navigation skills and fitness. Weather conditions are changeable in the Tararua Range.

== See also ==
- Southern Crossing of Tararua Range
- New Zealand tramping tracks
