= Freedom Camping Act 2011 =

Act of Parliament in New Zealand

Freedom Camping Act

New Zealand Parliament
- Citation: Freedom Camping Act 2011 (NZ).
- Assented to: 29 August 2011
- Commenced: 30 August 2011

Legislative history
- Introduced by: Kate Wilkinson
- Committee responsible: Local Government and Environment
- First reading: 9 June 2011
- Second reading: 11 August 2011
- Considered by the Local Government and Environment Committee: 16 August 2011
- Third reading: 16 August 2011
- Status: Current legislation

The Freedom Camping Act is an Act of Parliament passed into law in New Zealand in 2011 that allows local authorities to pass bylaws that permit or prohibit freedom camping in specific areas. In 2011 the Minister for the Environment Nick Smith announced that the government will introduce a Freedom Camping Bill into Parliament with the intention that the law will be in place before the Rugby World Cup.

== See also ==
- Camping in New Zealand
