= Nancy Adkin Ritchie =

New Zealand artist (1916–1964)

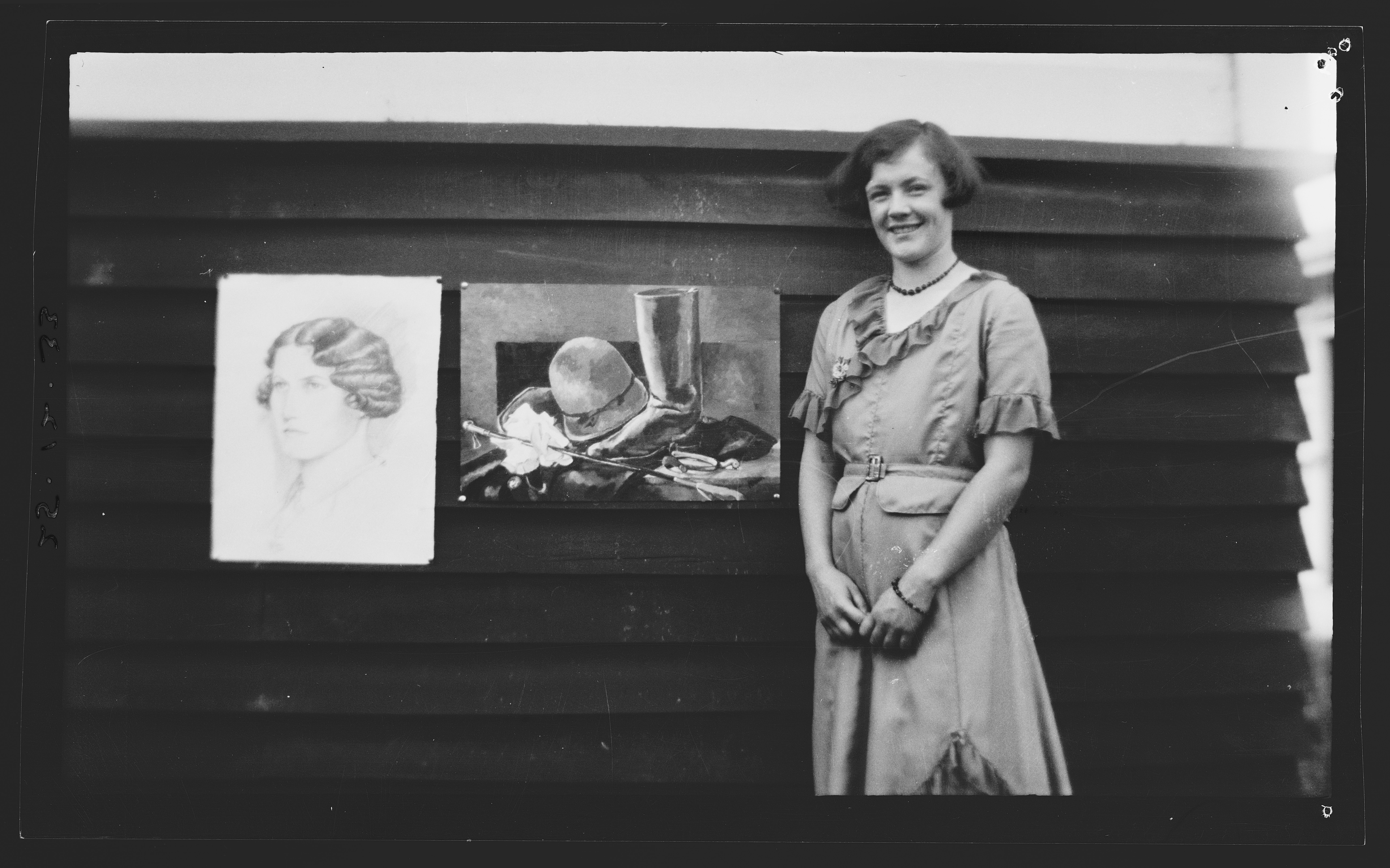
- Adkin and her art, 25 December 1933, photo by Leslie Adkin
- Born: Nancy Florence Adkin; 15 December 1916; Levin, New Zealand
- Died: 29 September 1964 (aged 47); Wellington, New Zealand
- Spouse: John A. H. Ritchie

Nancy Florence Adkin Ritchie (15 December 1916 – 29 September 1964) was a New Zealand artist. She was the daughter of Leslie Adkin.

== Biography ==
Nancy Florence Adkin was born on 15 December 1916 in Levin, New Zealand, to Maud and Leslie Adkin.

She exhibited with the New Zealand Academy of Fine Arts from 1933 to 1938. In 1940, she married John A. H. Ritchie. After her marriage, she continued exhibiting with the New Zealand Academy of Fine Arts from 1944 to 1953, and with both the Canterbury Society of Arts and Auckland Society of Arts, under the name Nancy Adkin Ritchie. She, and her husband, both exhibited as part of The Group in their 1948 show.

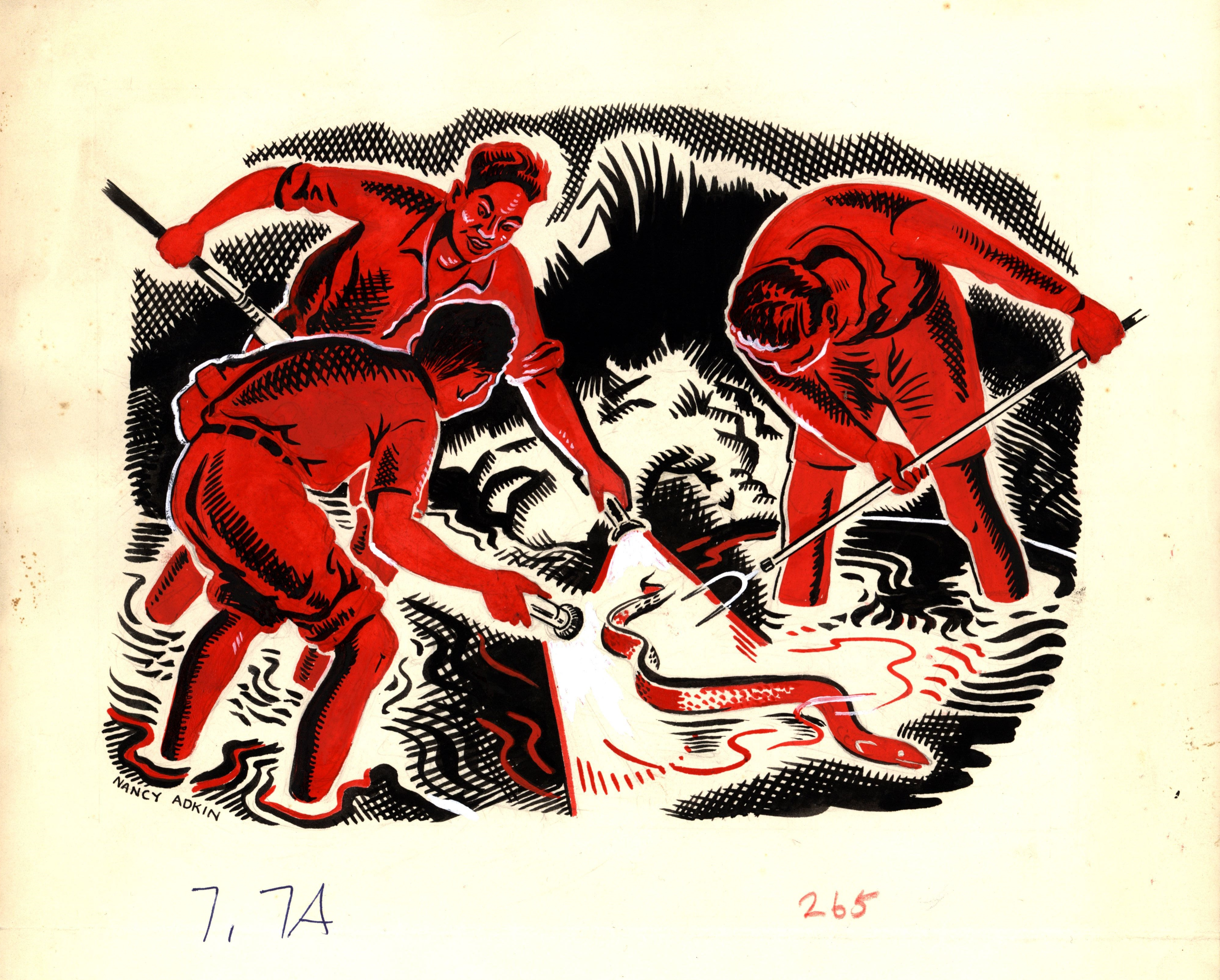
An illustration for a Samoan School Publications of Eel Catching by Nancy Adkin Ritchie

As well as exhibiting and selling paintings, Adkin Ritchie illustrated for Samoan school publications, and one of Leslie Adkin's book covers, and produced a mural for Hutt Intermediate School in Lower Hutt, New Zealand, in 1952.

Nancy Adkin Ritchie died on 29 September 1964 in Wellington, New Zealand.
