= Camping in New Zealand =

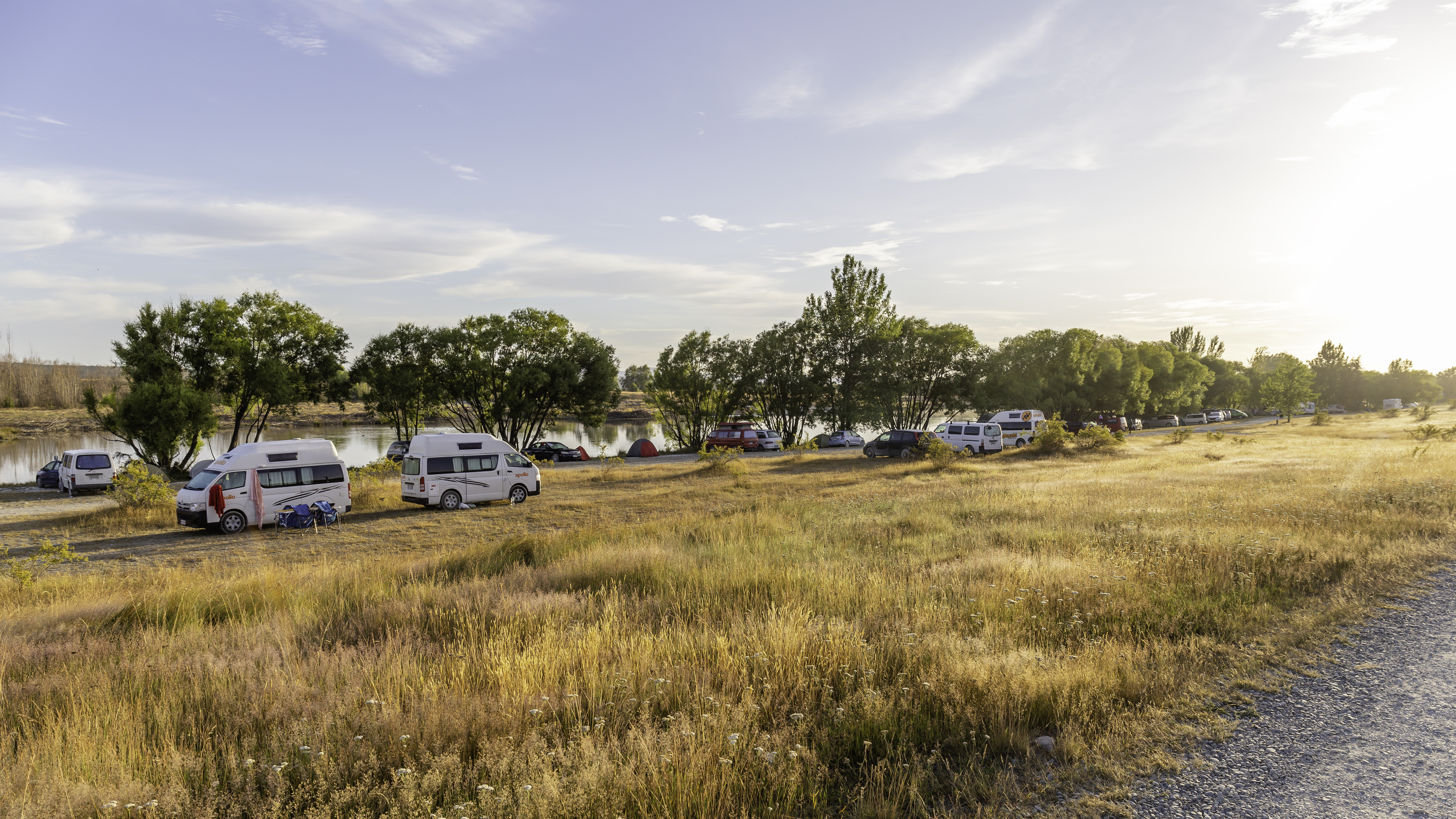
Camping vans at Lake Poaka Campsite, Twizel area, Canterbury

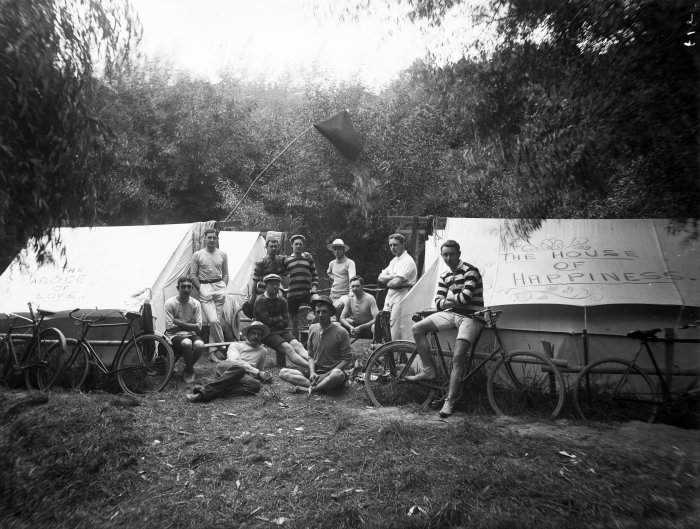
A group of men camping in New Zealand in about 1910

Camping is a popular activity for both New Zealand residents and for some of the two million foreign tourists arriving every year. Campsites of different standards, generally in conjunction with other forms of accommodation, are offered by holiday park operators throughout New Zealand. The facilities at these campsites vary from just a basic toilet to a full range of camp ground amenities.

Popular campsites during the summer holidays include the Mavora Lakes, Kaiteretere Beach, Mārahau and the Coromandel Peninsula. The summer holiday period, which is over Christmas and New Year, coincides with the peak of inbound tourists, leading to high levels of crowding at popular locations.

== Oversight ==
The Department of Conservation, which administers one third of the land area of New Zealand, operates 250 vehicle-accessible campsites on public land.

The largest organisation representing motorised campers is the New Zealand Motor Caravan Association, which was founded in 1956.

Camping grounds are governed by the Camping-Grounds Regulations 1985.

== Freedom camping ==
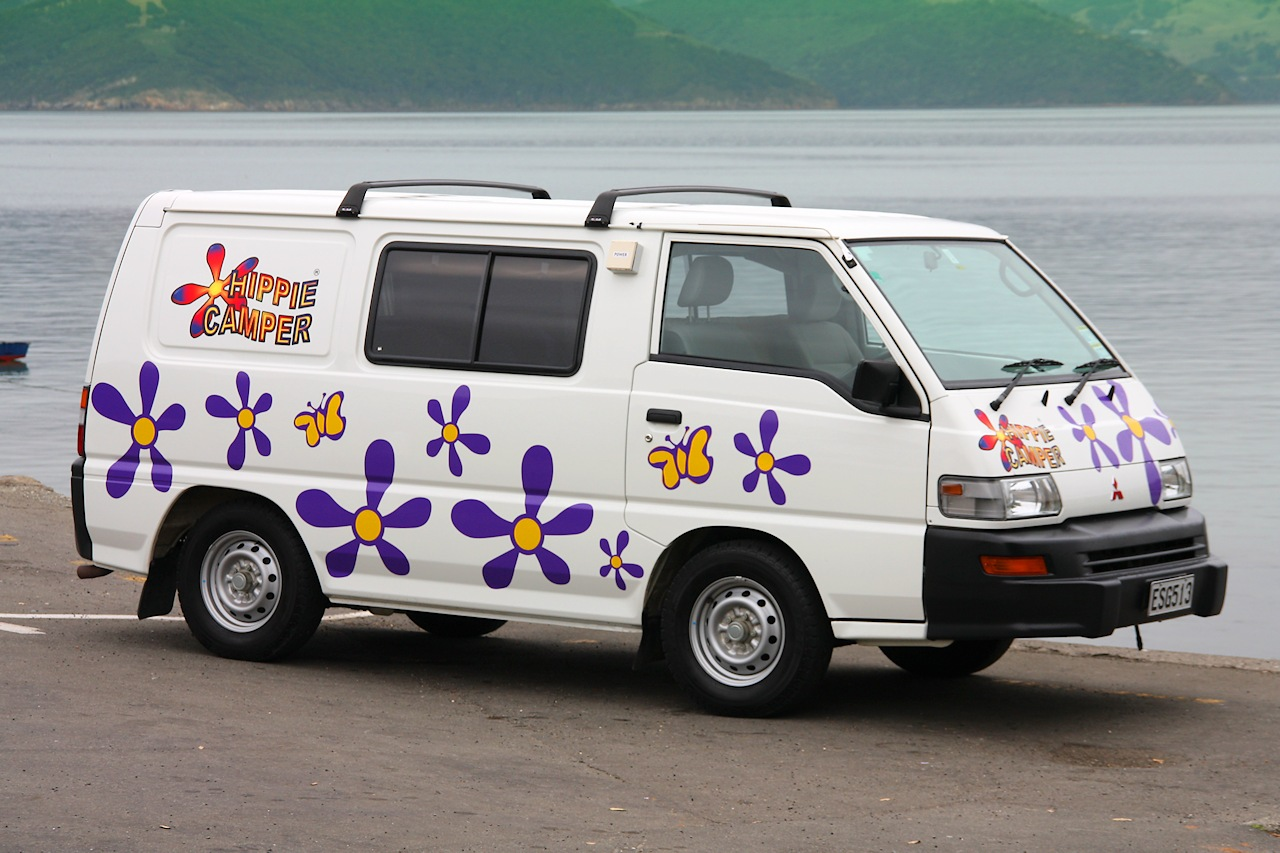
Camper van of Wicked Campers parked in Akaroa

Freedom camping, where camping is done in a location without facilities and is not a designated campground, is allowed in most public areas of New Zealand under certain conditions. Limitations have been put in place in recent decades because of litter and human waste problems, and attempts to encourage payment for camping by directing tourists to commercial facilities. Local residents, government authorities and tourism organisation are concerned about the impacts. The tourism industry has set up the New Zealand Responsible Camping Forum to address these concerns. The forum directs visitors to their Camping Our Way website for more information.

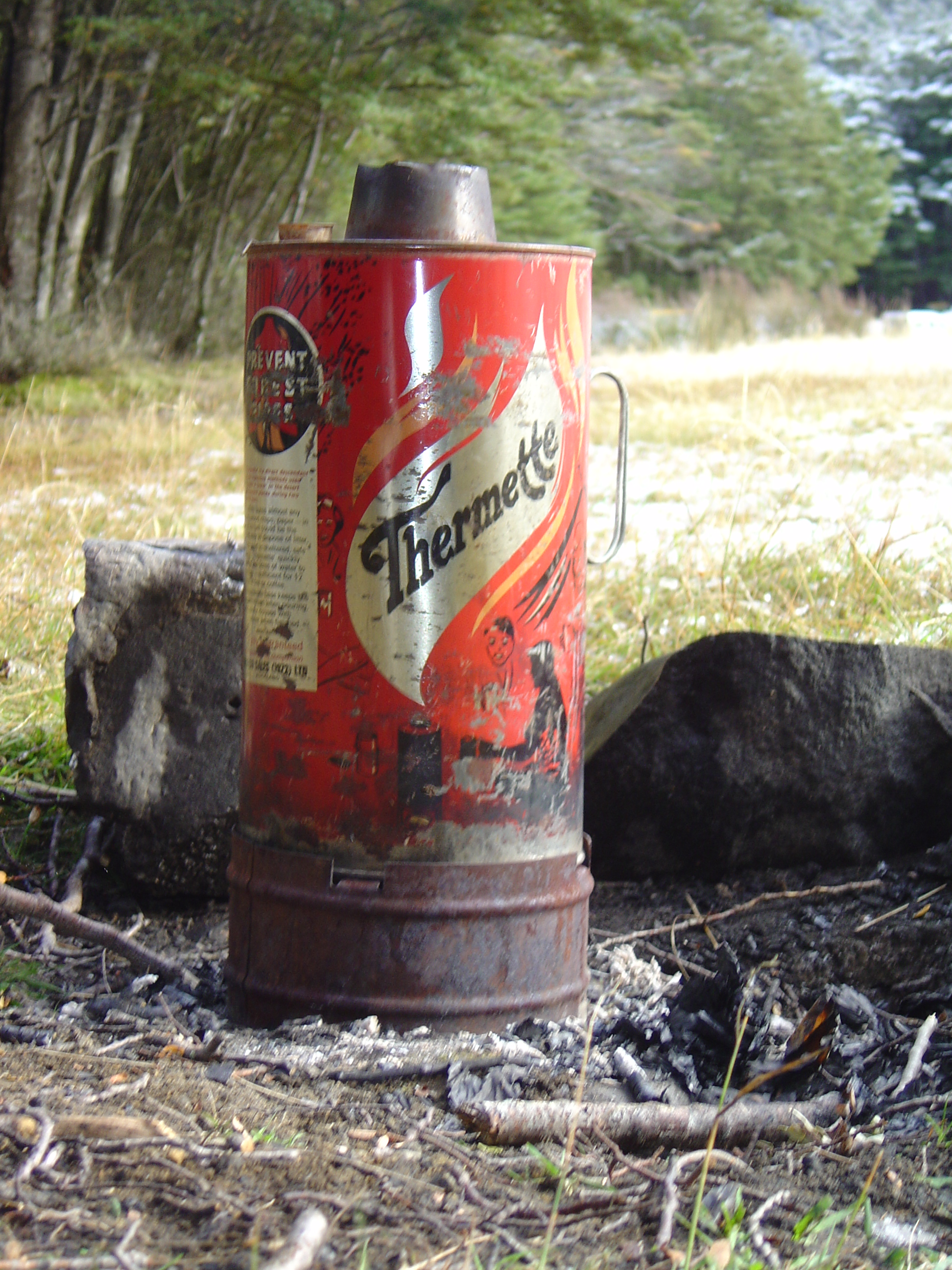
The thermette was a popular item of camping equipment in New Zealand prior to the advent of gas camping stoves.

Although there is the realisation that the right to access the wilderness must be protected, as it is in European countries with local laws protecting the freedom to roam, this needs to be balanced with the fact that freedom camping can create problems when campers dispose of human waste incorrectly. There are also reports of the discharge of greywater from campervans while parked on suburban streets. Campers using self-contained camper vans are also disposing of human waste incorrectly by not using the dump stations supplied for this purpose.

The causes of the problem relating to freedom camping have been stated as:

- lack of toilets
- disposal from campervan toilets
- increased number of freedom campers
- poor knowledge by the campers about the issue
- inconsistent application and enforcement of the laws and regulations by government agencies
- remoteness of the area

=== Legislative responses ===
In 2011 the Minister for the Environment Nick Smith announced that the government would introduce a Freedom Camping Bill into Parliament with the intention that the law will be in place before the Rugby World Cup. Provisions in the proposed Bill would allow for a $200 instant fine for those camping illegally and a fine of up to $10,000 for those who incorrectly dump sewerage. The Bill passed into law as the Freedom Camping Act 2011 on 29 August 2011.

At first, the Freedom Camping Act was widely misinterpreted as only allowing freedom camping in areas specified as freedom camping areas. However, blanket bans on freedom camping were explicitly prohibited by the Act. To clarify the situation, in December 2012 an update to the Guidance to Local Authorities concerning the Freedom Camping Bill was issued. The updated clearly stated "freedom camping is permitted everywhere in a local authority area unless it is prohibited or restricted in accordance with a by-law".

The Guidance also reiterated a number of wide-ranging powers that were extended to councils and Department of Conservation (DOC) to control freedom camping in prohibited or restricted areas. These include instant fines of $200 for freedom camping in prohibited or restricted areas. As well as a summary conviction and a fine not exceeding $10,000 for discharging noxious, dangerous or offensive substances onto a local authority area (e.g. the incorrect disposal of human waste). An enforcement officer may also require people to leave an area, or seize a boat, caravan or motor vehicle if they believe, on reasonable grounds, that they have committed or are committing an offence under the Freedom Camping Act.

The Guidance describes the use of freedom camping bylaws as the last resort to be deployed by local councils to ensure the environment is respected. The Guide identifies that the onus is on councils to educate the public and visitors about being responsible when freedom camping, and where appropriate provide facilities such as toilets, rubbish bins and waste disposal stations in areas where freedom camping is creating issues.

In late November 2021, Minister of Tourism Stuart Nash announced that the Government would be introducing a Self-Contained Vehicles Bill in February 2022. This proposed legislation states that only self-contained vehicles with fixed toilets will be able to stay on land managed by council. Non-self contained vehicles will be allowed to stay on DOC land and commercial grounds unless the Department of Conservation has prohibited it. Freedom campers will be allowed to stay in tents overnight where permitted.

== See also ==
- Tramping in New Zealand
- Tourism in New Zealand
