= Tongariro Northern Circuit =

Hiking trail in Tongariro National Park, New Zealand

Coordinates: 39.145667°S 175.624707°E

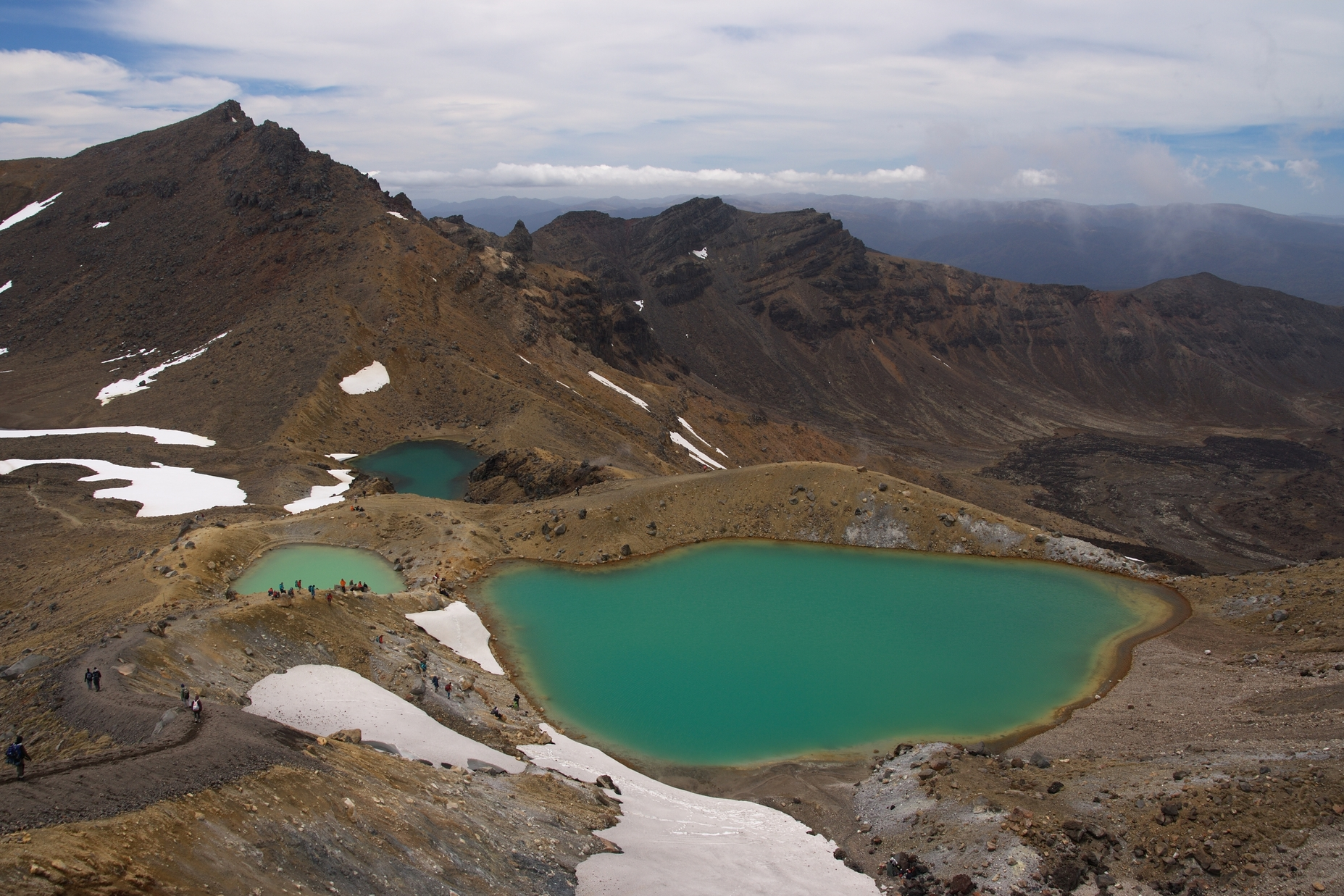
- The Emerald Lakes
- Length: 43.1 km (26.8 mi)
- Location: Tongariro National Park
- Established: 1993
- Designation: Great Walk
- Trailheads: Whakapapa Village
- Use: Hiking
- Highest point: Red Crater, 1,886 m (6,188 ft)
- Hazards: Volcanic
- Maintainer: Department of Conservation
- Website: Tongariro Northern Circuit

The Tongariro Northern Circuit, one of the New Zealand Great Walks, offers a three- to four-day tramp through Tongariro National Park New Zealand. Highlighted by the Tongariro Alpine Crossing, a full day of awe-inspiring landscapes, The entire trail spans a 50-kilometre (31 mi) around Mount Ngauruhoe. Approximately 2,500 hikers completed the walk in the 2021/22 season. This contrasts with the roughly 25,000 who solely walk the Tongariro Crossing segment.

== Accommodation ==
There are three New Zealand Department of Conservation (DOC) huts around the circuit - Mangatepopo, Oturere and Waihohonu. A fourth hut, Ketetahi, was damaged in the 2012 eruption, converted to a day shelter, and then removed completely a few years later. It is forbidden to camp within 500 metres (1,600 ft) of the track.
