= Rakiura Track =

Hiking trail in New Zealand

Coordinates: 46.862891°S 168.123436°E

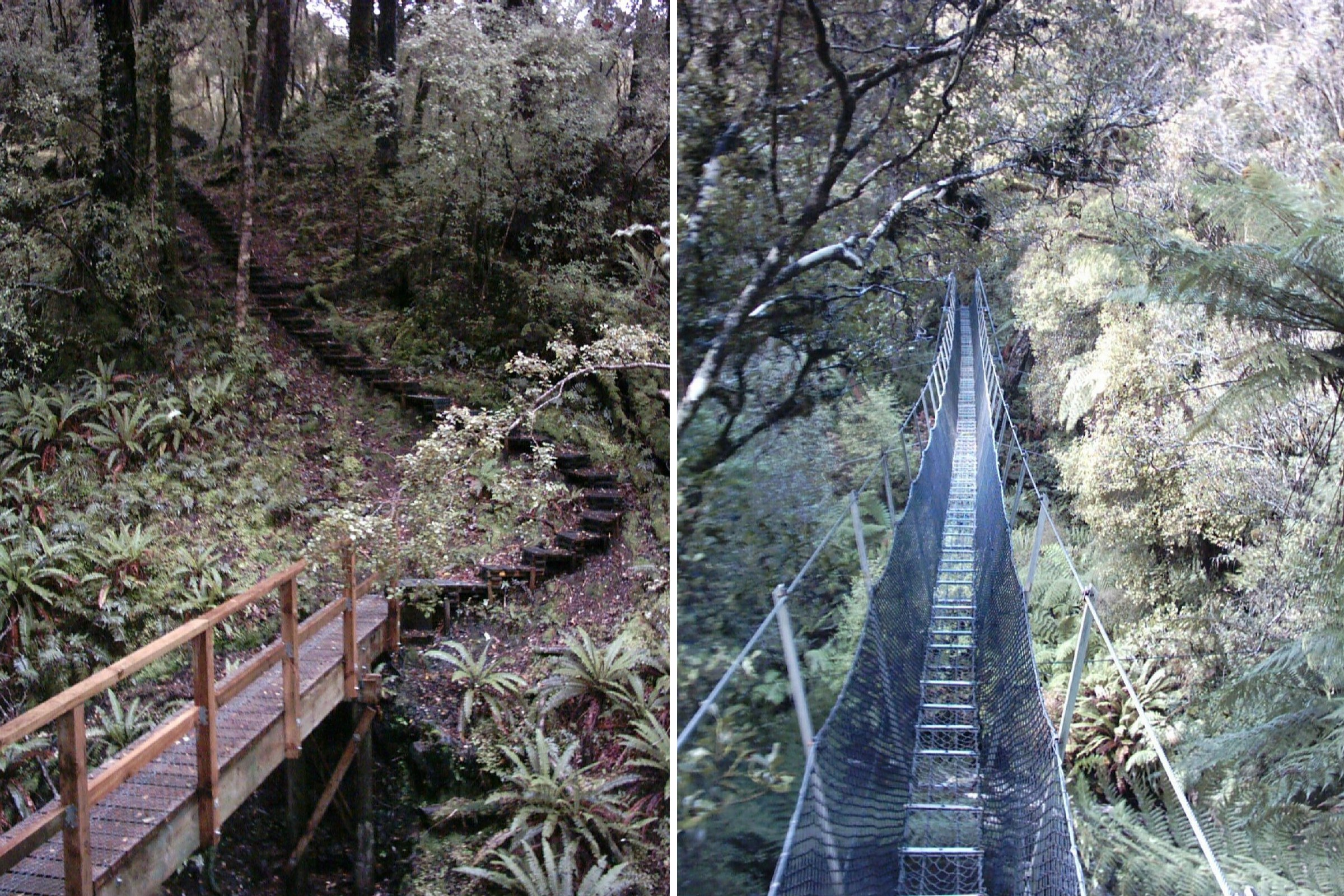
The winding nature of the track through the bush

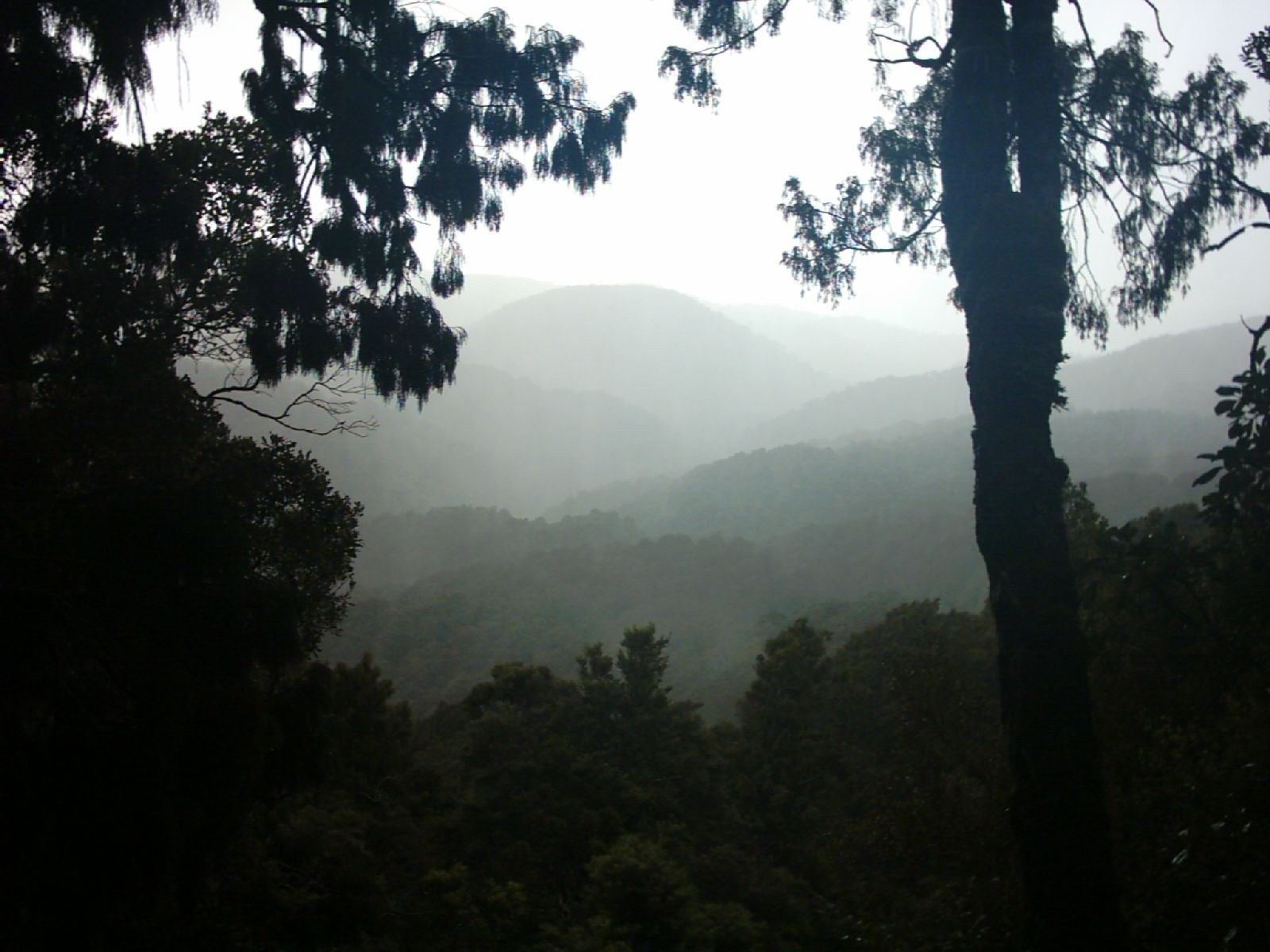
The hills of the middle track section on a misty morning

The Rakiura Track is a 32-kilometre (20 mi) circular tramping track in Rakiura National Park on Stewart Island in New Zealand. It is one of the New Zealand Great Walks. Hikers often take three days to walk it, but it can be done in one or two days.

One end is at Lee Bay, five km (3.1 mi) north of Oban (Stewart Island's only settlement), and the other end is at Fern Gully, two km (1.2 mi) west of Oban. It can be walked either way, but is most often walked anticlockwise, starting at Lee Bay. Hikers can arrange transport from Oban over the roads to and from the ends of the track, or can walk along the roads.

The track generally follows the coastline for a large part of its length, passing small inlets, large bays and mudflats, and crosses steep hills covered in bush (dense forest) in its middle section. Large sections of the track have been gravelled. Without this, much of the track would degrade into mud, due to the peaty soil, and the rain that falls frequently throughout the year. In general, the track is well-maintained, and of easy to medium difficulty. Walking the track offers the unusual opportunity to see kiwi in the wild. The species on Stewart Island is the southern brown kiwi (Apteryx australis).

There are two huts on the track, at Port William and the North Arm of Paterson Inlet, and many hikers sleep overnight at each. There are also campsites at Maori Beach, Port William and North Arm. The huts and campsites have toilets and water supply, and the huts have bunks and mattresses. Toilet paper is not provided and hikers must bring their own. There are no cooking facilities, so trampers are advised to carry their own stoves and cooking equipment. Gas canisters and other supplies can be purchased at a store in Oban before setting out. The huts are supplied with firewood, which is flown in by helicopter, as there are no roads to the huts, and trampers are not allowed to cut firewood. The huts and campsites must be booked in advance.

Rakiura Track has been covered by Google Street View since November 2015.
