= Tongariro Alpine Crossing =

Tramping track in New Zealand

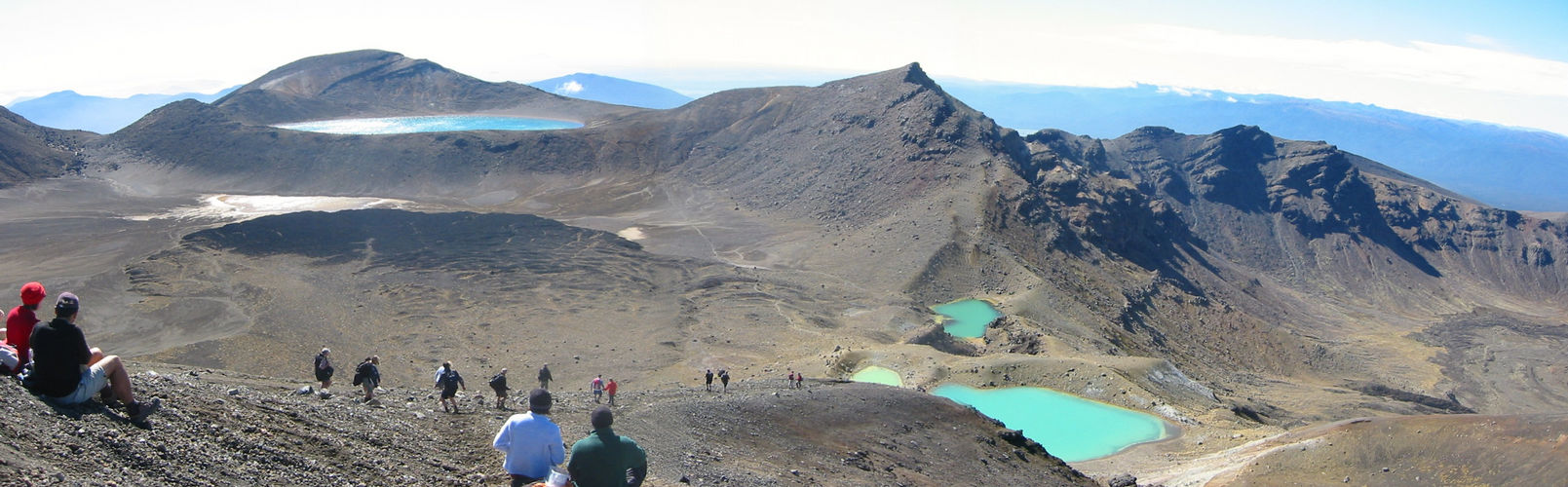
- View from the summit over the Emerald Lakes, across the Central Crater, to Blue Lake. Autumn 2004.
- Length: 19.4 km (12.1 mi)
- Location: Tongariro National Park, North Island, New Zealand
- Trailheads: Mangatepopo Carpark; Ketetahi Carpark
- Use: Hiking
- Highest point: Red Crater, 1,886 m (6,188 ft)
- Lowest point: Ketetahi Carpark, 760 m (2,490 ft)
- Difficulty: Moderate
- Website: www.doc.govt.nz/parks-and-recreation/places-to-go/central-north-island/places/tongariro-national-park/things-to-do/tracks/tongariro-alpine-crossing

The Tongariro Alpine Crossing in Tongariro National Park is a tramping track in New Zealand, and is among the most popular day hikes in the country. The Tongariro National Park is a World Heritage site which has the distinction of dual status, as it has been acknowledged for both its natural and cultural significance.

The crossing passes over the volcanic terrain of the multi-cratered active volcano Mount Tongariro, passing the eastern base of Mount Ngauruhoe.

The full distance of the track is usually 19.4-kilometre (12.1 mi).

== Walk details ==
The Tongariro Alpine Crossing is usually walked from Mangatepopo in the Ruapehu region to Ketetahi Hot Springs, due to the Mangatepopo end being higher in altitude (1,120 m or 3,670 ft) than the Ketetahi Hot Springs end (760 m or 2,490 ft), therefore requiring less climbing. The crossing takes about seven hours of steady walking to complete in good weather, taking longer in winter or if walked from the Ketetahi end.

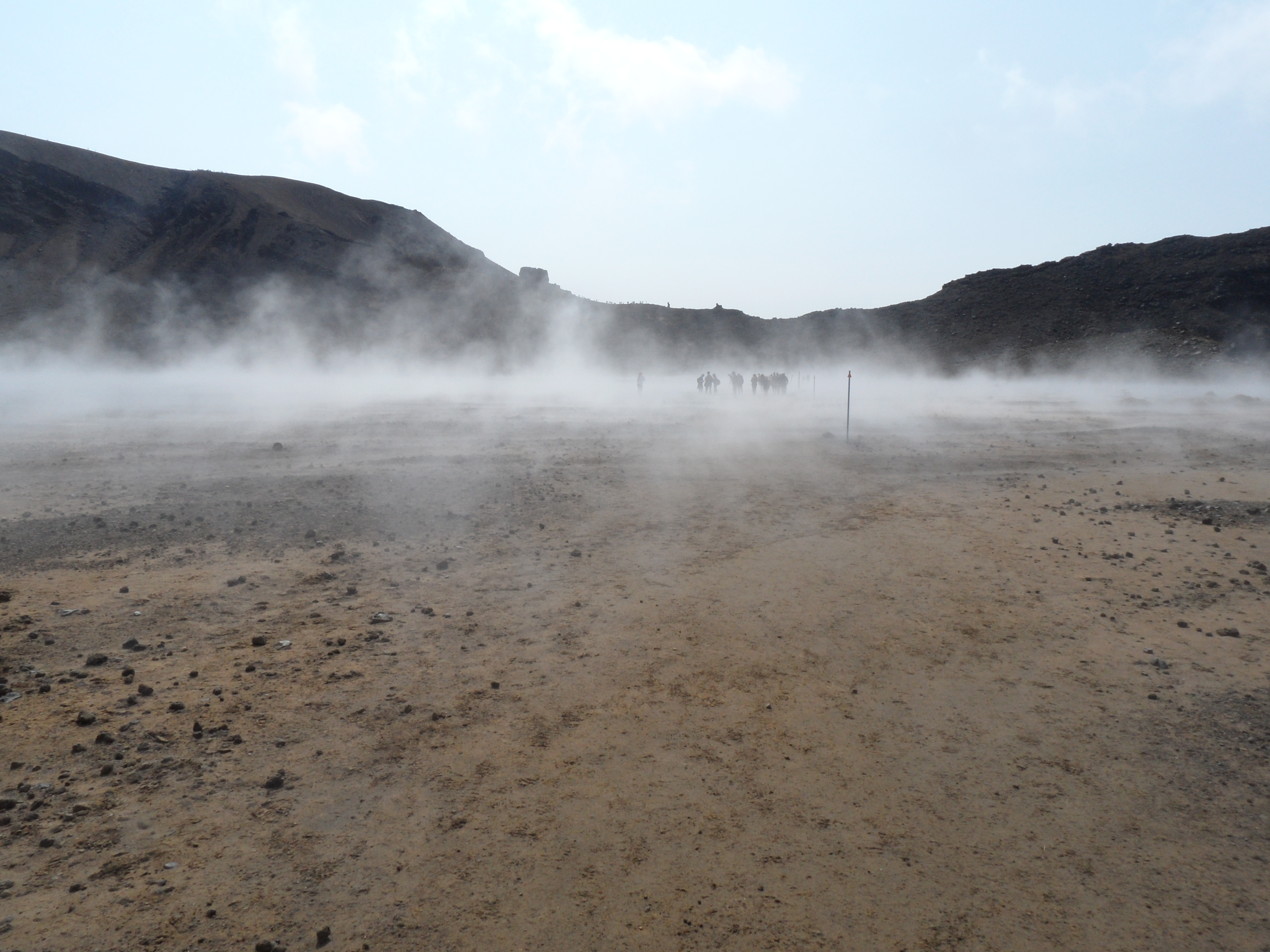
The steaming moonscape of South Crater on the Tongariro Alpine Crossing

As of October 2023, the Department of Conservation instituted a booking system for the hike in order to gather better information about its usage.

The crossing is a linear journey, starting on the west side of Mount Tongariro and finishing on the north side. Originally, this meant that returning to the western end required retracing the 19.4 km crossing, walking 26 km via State Highways 46 and 47 back to the other trailhead, or completing the Tongariro Northern Circuit. Nowadays there are many local companies that offer shuttle services between the track end points

The track begins at the western end near the Mangatepopo Hut with a low gradient until the foot of the steep Tongariro saddle. After the climb to the saddle, the path takes descents and ascents into and back out of two different craters, passing the Emerald Lakes and along the edge of the Blue Lake. The last two hours of the walk involve a long descent down the northern flank of the volcano, passing the Ketetahi Hot Springs. New Zealand Mountain Safety Council's video on the Tongariro Alpine Crossing

Climbing of Mount Ngauruhoe as a side trip from the main crossing is not allowed anymore (as requested by the local iwi) and track markings were removed.

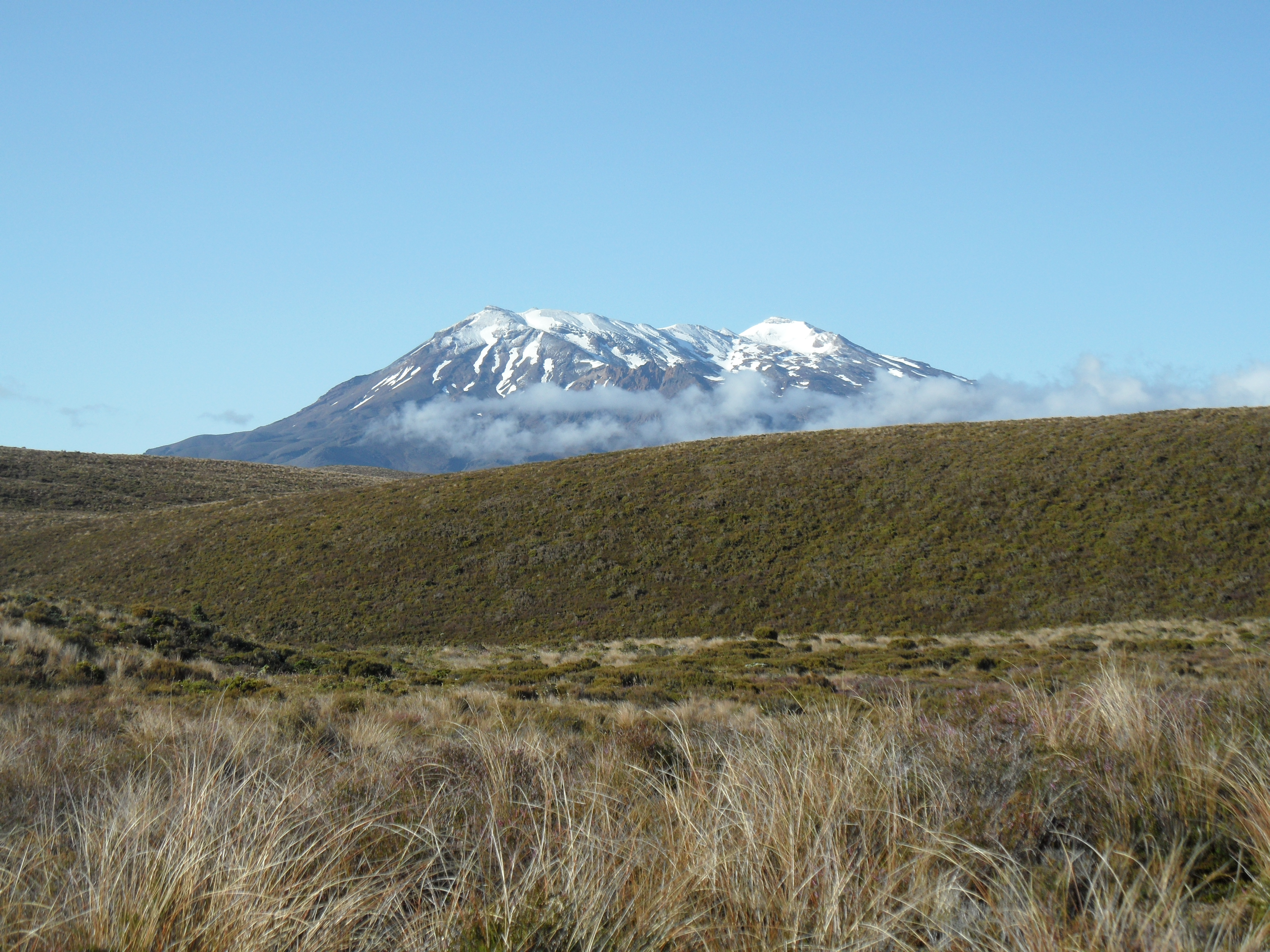
Mt Ruapehu peeking above the rolling tussock mounds at the start of the Tongariro Alpine Crossing

There are no guaranteed fresh water supplies on the walk. Springs in the area are often scalding hot and tainted with minerals and dissolved metals from the volcanic activity. Most natural water in the area is not drinkable. Access is not permitted to Ketetahi Hot Springs, about 10 minutes from the Ketetahi hut. The springs are located on 38 ha (94 acres) of private land owned by the local iwi Ngāti Tuwharetoa that has never been part of Tongariro National Park. The area of the springs is dangerous and a person was badly burned in 2007 when they entered the closed area.

Point	Distance	Time	Altitude	Coordinates
Mangatepopo Carpark	0.0 km (0.0 mi)	0h 00m	1,120 m (3,670 ft)	39°08′40″S 175°34′52″E
Mangatepopo Hut	1.5 km (0.9 mi)	0hr 25m	1,190 m (3,900 ft)	39°08′41″S 175°35′48″E
Soda Springs turn-off		1h 30m	1,350 m (4,430 ft)	39°08′24″S 175°37′29″E
South Crater	6.4 km (4.0 mi)	2h 30m	1,650 m (5,410 ft)	39°08′35″S 175°38′04″E
Red Crater summit		3h 30m	1,886 m (6,188 ft)	39°08′08″S 175°39′01″E
Emerald Lakes (Oturere Hut turn-off)	9.0 km (5.6 mi)	3h 50m	1,695 m (5,561 ft)	39°07′58″S 175°39′23″E
Ketetahi Hut		5h 15m	1,450 m (4,760 ft)	39°06′29″S 175°39′11″E
Ketetahi Carpark	19.4 km (12.1 mi)	7h 00m	760 m (2,490 ft)	39°04′25″S 175°39′50″E

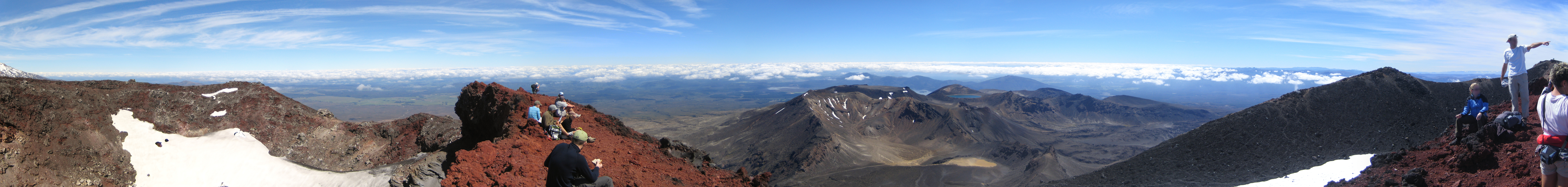
Panorama view from Mt Ngauruhoe in Tongariro National Park

== Alpine exposure and 2007 name change ==
Until 2007 the crossing was called the "Tongariro Crossing", but this was changed to the "Tongariro Alpine Crossing" to emphasize the extreme weather on the exposed terrain. Almost the entire length of the crossing is in volcanic terrain with no vegetation and fully exposed to weather – at moderate altitude. As the crossing is easily accessible, it is walked by large numbers of tourists and casual walkers each year. The Department of Conservation is concerned about trampers being unprepared for the conditions they may encounter and introduced the name change to warn the many poorly equipped visitors of potential hazards. Key hazards are the high wind chill factor, the rapid change in weather and very poor visibility in the sudden storms with blinding snow and cloud. In 2006, two people of an estimated 65,000 walkers died on the track. Although the route is marked with poles, it is quite common in poor weather for visibility to be severely reduced. Poles may be snow covered or destroyed by wind gusts in winter.

== Volcanic features ==
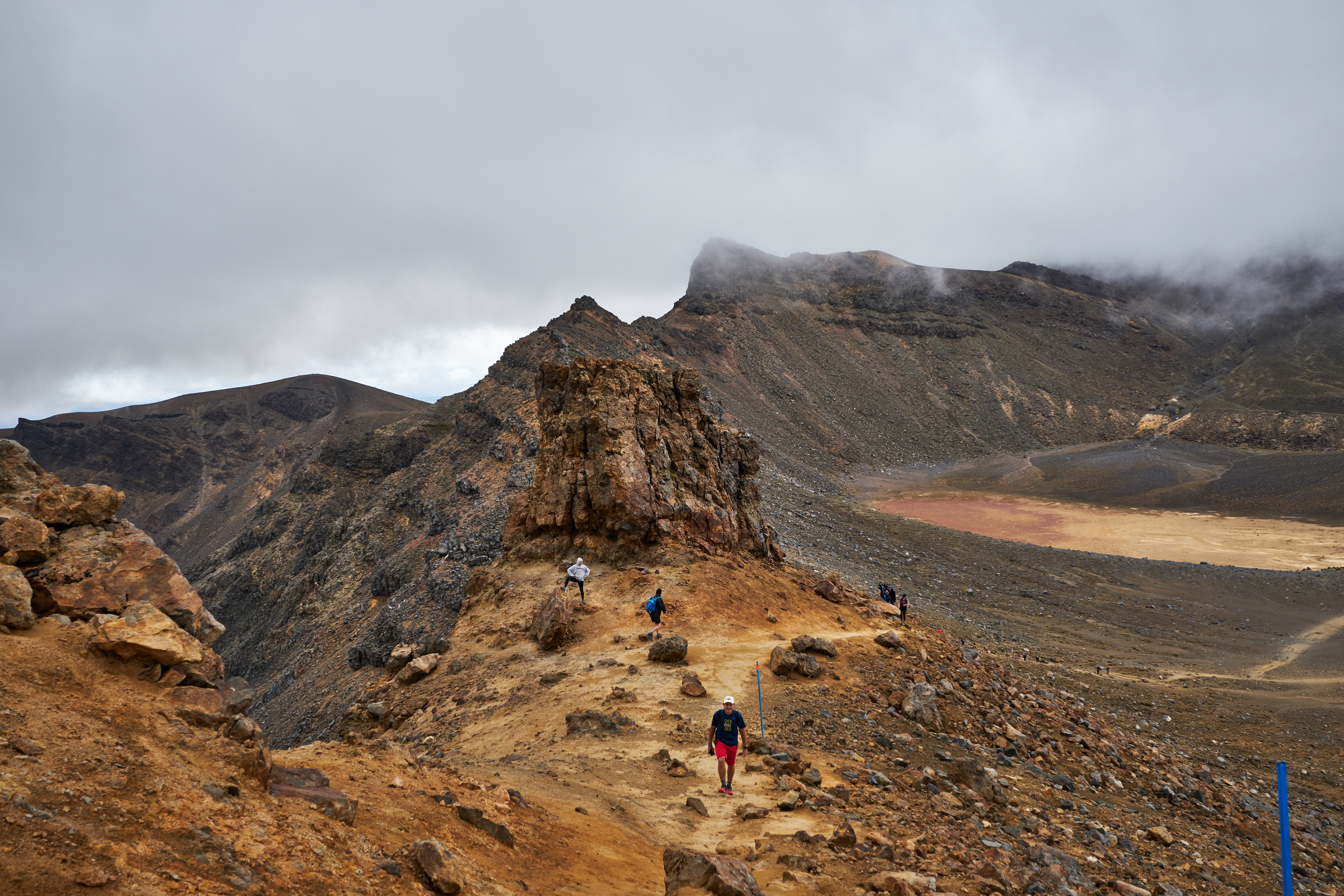
A view of harsh volcanic landscape on the Tongariro Alpine Crossing

Most of the walk is through raw volcanic terrain. The three volcanoes in the area are all highly active and the terrain reflects this. Solidified lava flows, loose tephra, and solidified volcanic lava bombs abound. Large amounts of minerals are brought to the surface and are highly visible in the colours of rocks and ridges. Active fumaroles abound on several sections of the walk, constantly emitting steam and sulphur dioxide gas into the air and depositing yellow sulphur specks around their edges. The lakes and pools on the walk are deeply coloured by the volcanic minerals dissolved in them. Some areas feature large springs emitting near-boiling water and torrents of steam. The terrain underfoot for most of the walk is either sharp edged new volcanic rock or loose and shifting tephra, mainly ash and lapilli. In some crater areas it is finer ash that has become moist and compacted.

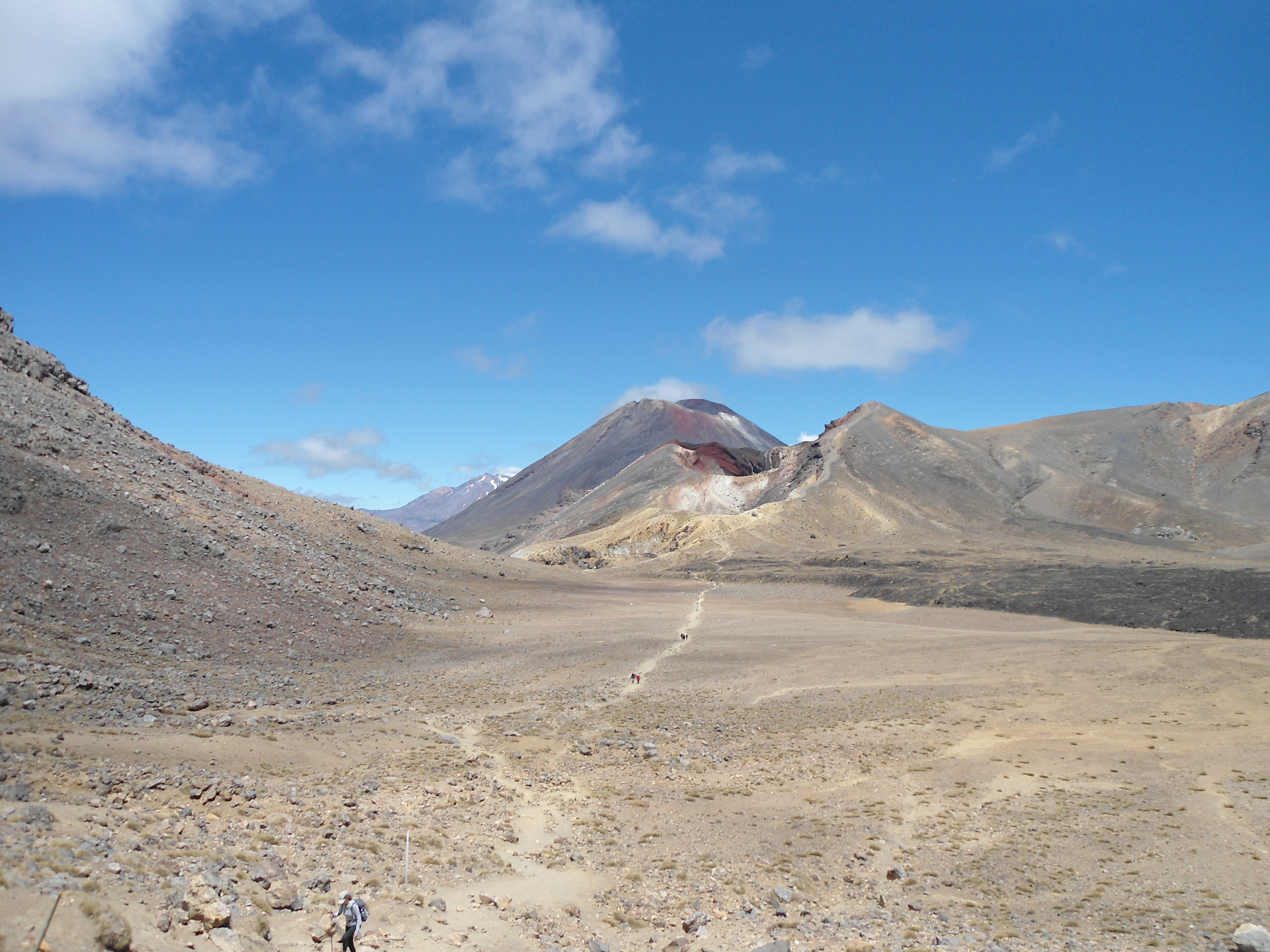
Tongariro Alpine Crossing from Central Crater in summer

In August 2012 a small eruption of 10,000 cubic metres of ash from the Te Maari (sometimes spelled Te Māri or Te Mari) craters on Mt Tongariro sent a shower of ash and blocks up to 1m in diameter over the track. The blocks damaged the roof of the Ketetahi hut which is 1.5 km west of the explosive craters. No one was hurt. The alpine crossing was temporarily closed as about 75% of the track is within 3 km of Te Maari. The track is usually to windward of Te Maari as the prevailing wind is west to south west in this region. When mixed with rain the ash forms a gritty mud. In late November 2012 Te Maari crater again erupted an ash cloud 4,000m high over a 5-minute period. About 100 people were in the vicinity including a group of 20 13-year-old students from Gulf Harbour school but no one was injured. The crater is visible from the Ketetahi area. There are no tracks to Te Maari as it is an unstable, volcanically active zone. The Tongariro Alpine track was closed for 4 days but the other 12 tracks on the mountains were left open. Fumaroles remain active around the active rim of Te Maari crater and there is a strong smell of sulphur gas close to the rim.

== Other information ==
Tongariro Crossing will become one of four natural attractions that will start charging entry fees for foreign tourists. Under the proposed scheme, foreign visitors will be required to pay between NZ$20 (€10) and NZ$40 (€20) to access the natural landmarks, generating up to €32 million to invest in natural sites.

== See also ==
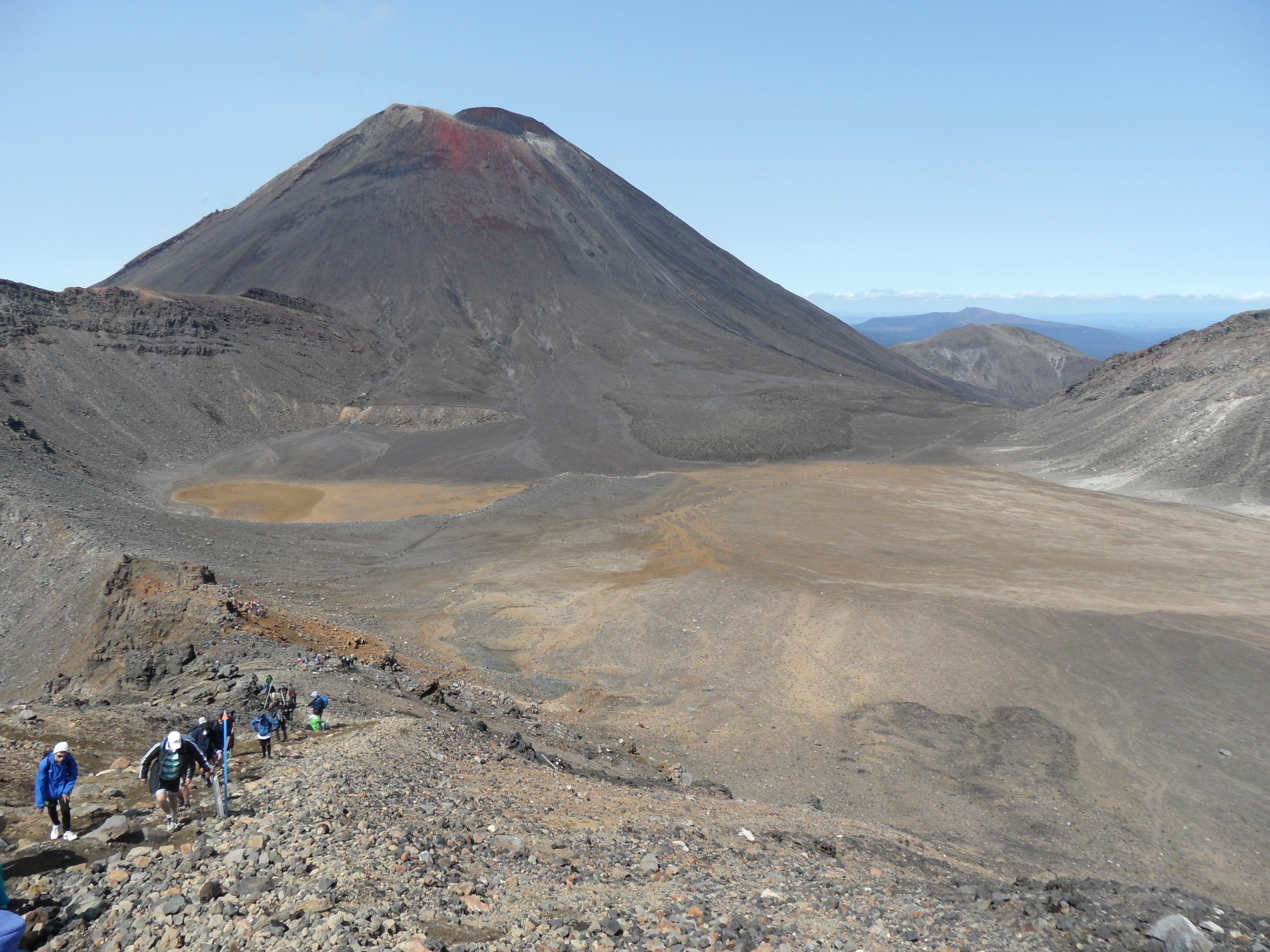
View of Mount Ngauruhoe from Red Crater on Mt Tongariro

- New Zealand tramping tracks
- Tongariro Northern Circuit
