= Leslie Adkin =

New Zealand amateur geologist, archaeologist, ethnologist, photographer, environmentalist

- Born: 26 July 1888; Wellington
- Died: 21 May 1964; Wellington
- Occupations: Anthropologist, photographer, archaeologist, farmer, geologist, ethnologist

George Leslie Adkin (26 July 1888 – 21 May 1964) was a New Zealand farmer, geologist, archaeologist, ethnologist, photographer, tramper and environmentalist. As an amateur scholar he made a significant contribution to the study of natural sciences in New Zealand.

== Biography ==
George Leslie Adkin, known as Leslie Adkin, was born in Wellington, New Zealand, the first child of seven of William George Adkin, a draper and his wife, Annie Denton. The Adkin family later moved to Levin to farm and Leslie was to complete his schooling by boarding at Wellington College.

During his time as a boarding student Adkin developed an interest in collecting plants and rocks and also learnt to process his own photographs. His enthusiasm for photography never faltered during his lifetime and his large collection of negatives form a visual diary of his life and activities.

After completing secondary school Adkin returned to the family farm in Levin. He combined his interest in geology with tramping and explored the Tararua ranges making the first recorded crossing from Levin to Masterton. His maternal grandfather, George Denton, introduced him to the Wellington Philosophical Society and from 1910 he began to submit papers. His second paper (delivered in 1911) recorded his (at the time controversial) belief that the five high Tararua valleys had been formed by glaciation. The debate this paper only served to encourage Adkin and he became even more meticulous in his research.

In 1913 Adkin took over part of his father's farm. Adkin married Elizabeth Maud Herd, an accomplished violinist, pianist and painter, on 14 December 1914. They went on to have two children, Nancy and Clyde. Adkin continued to record his farming and family life in his photography.

Although farming was his main occupation he continued to explore and helped start up the Levin-Waiopehu Tramping Club. When the sport of tramping became popular in the 1920s he became the acknowledged authority on the northern Tarauas.

Adkin continued his research into geology but discoveries of archeological sites led him into archeology and ethnology. In 1926, Adkin provided photographs for Te Hekenga, an account of Māori life in Horowhenua and with the help of local Māori, he described and mapped hundreds of Māori sites between the Manawatu and Otaki rivers. Adkin followed the advice of a close friend, Elsdon Best, and joined the Polynesian Society and contributed his ethnological articles to the Polynesian Society Journal.

When Adkin's son, Clyde, took over the farm in 1946, Adkin moved to Wellington and joined the New Zealand Geological Survey. He in Wellington, where he produced bibliographies and papers on the geomorphology of the southern North Island. His 1948 book, Horowhenua, gave accounts of Horowhenua place names and controversial essays about the history of New Zealand's Māori occupation.

Adkin was also a passionate environmentalist. He was an early critic of bush-felling on the uplands and recognised the threat of newly emergy earthmoving technology to both natural and archeological sites. He served in many organisations that contributed to the rise of the New Zealand conservation movement including the Levin Native Flora Club, the New Zealand Ecological Society, The Forest and Bird Protection Society of New Zealand and the National Historic Places Trust.

Adkin died at Wellington on 21 May 1964. His photographic negatives, extensive diaries and archeological artifacts are held by the Museum of New Zealand Te Papa Tongarewa while his albums, manuscripts, maps and drawings are held by the Alexander Turnbull Library.

== Gallery ==
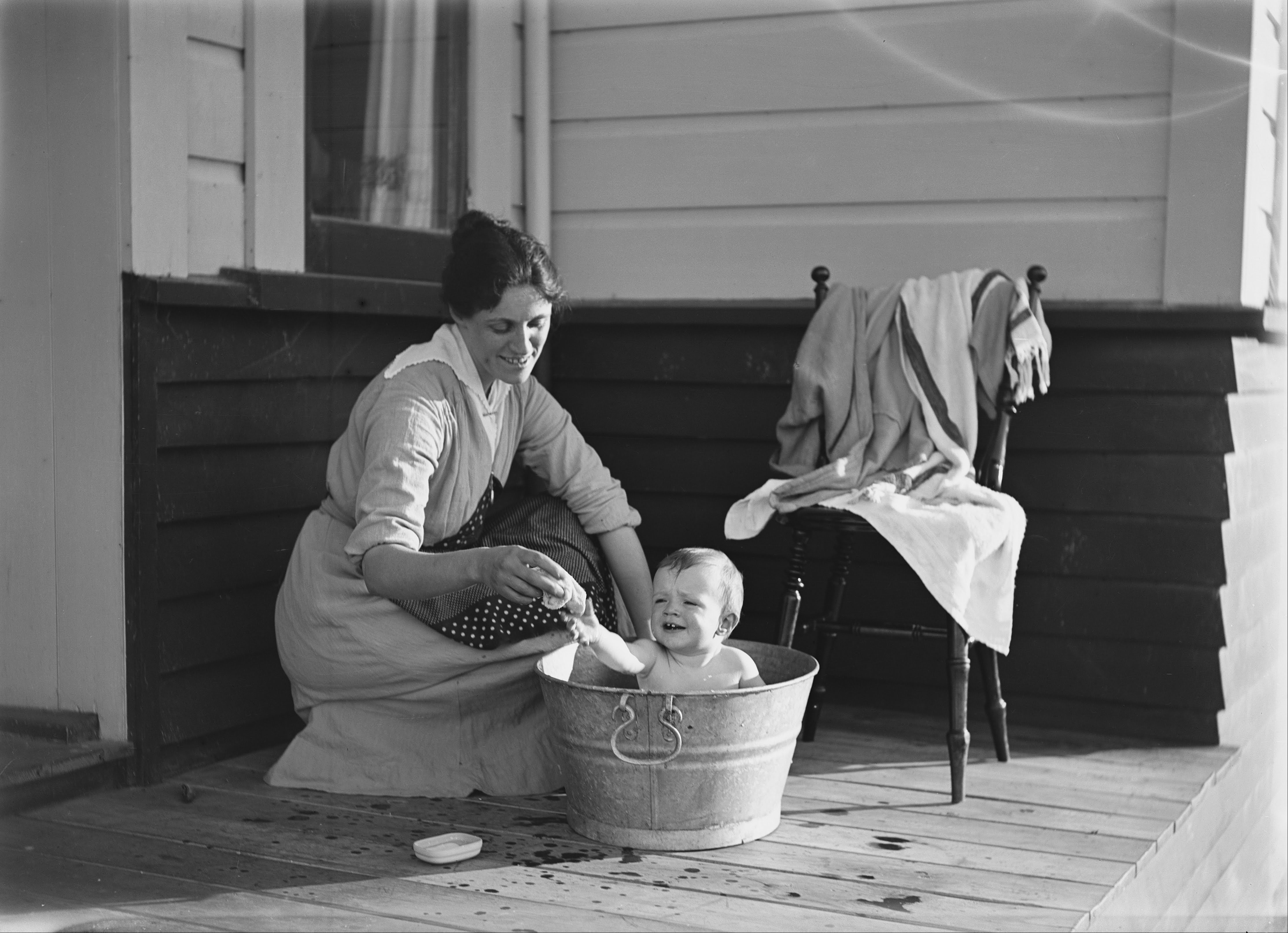
The order of the bath (1917)
