= Lake Waikaremoana Great Walk =

Hiking trail in New Zealand's North Island

Coordinates: 38°46′S 177°05′E

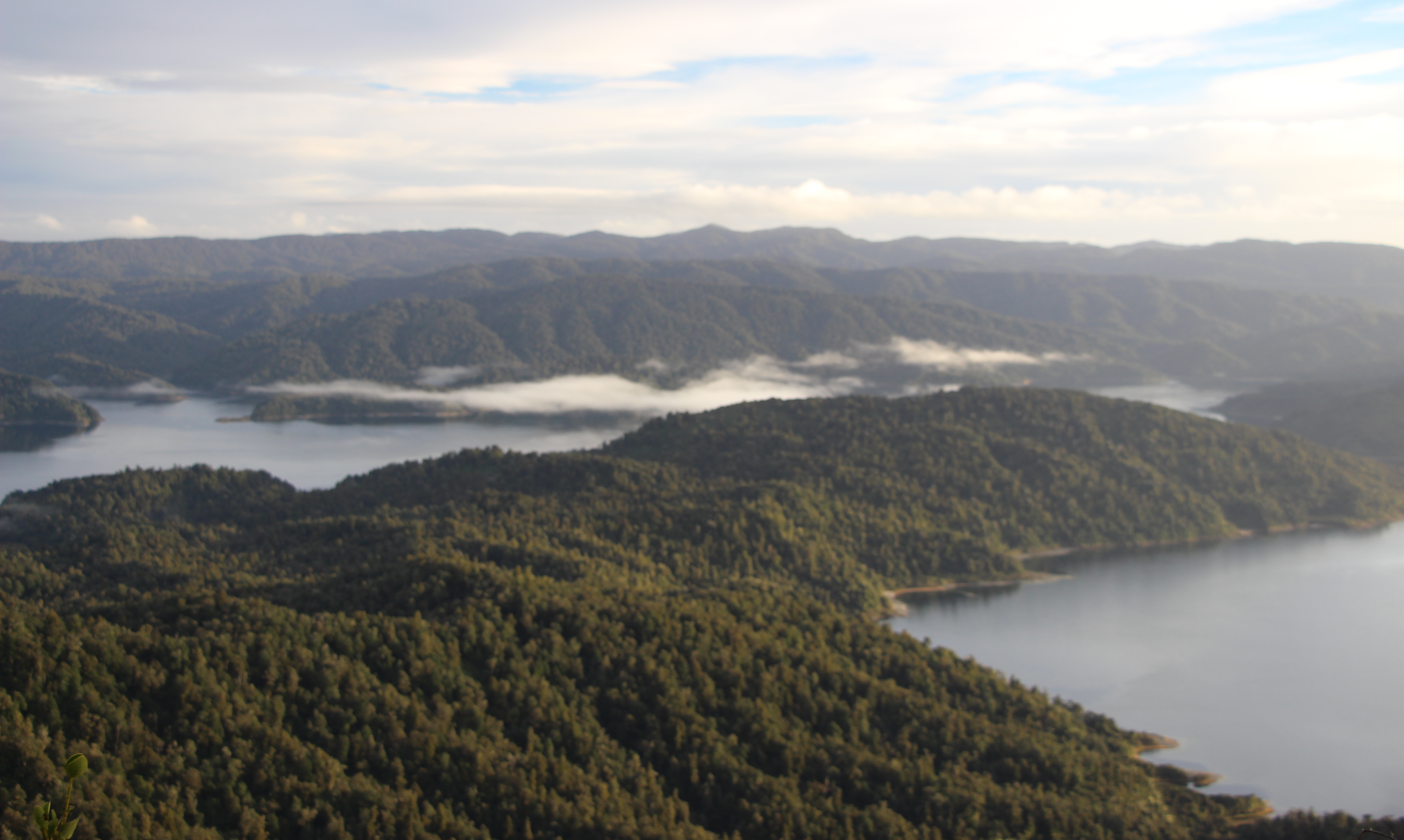
- Lake Waikaremoana as viewed from track
- Length: 44 km (27 mi)
- Location: Lake Waikaremoana, Te Urewera National Park, New Zealand
- Designation: New Zealand Great Walk
- Use: Tramping, trail running
- Difficulty: Medium
- Season: Summer to autumn
- Surface: Dirt

The Lake Waikaremoana Great Walk is a 44-kilometre (27 mi) tramping track which follows the southern and western coast of Lake Waikaremoana in the North Island of New Zealand. Passing through several types of forest, and grassland, the track often provides views over the lake. It is classified as one of New Zealand's Great Walks, and is located in the former Te Urewera National Park.

== Tramping ==
The trailheads are at Onepoto, and Hopuruahine, on the southern and northern edges of the lake respectively. Most people take 3 to 4 days to complete the trail.

The trail passes through several areas of private land, and touches the edge of the Puketukutuku Peninsula Kiwi Refuge.

Place	Distance	Time	Description
Onepoto	8.8 km	5 hours	Passing the former Armed Constabulary Redoubt near the start of the trail, the track then climbs steeply up onto Panekire Bluff. The bluffs form part of the southern shore, and provide views over the expanse of the lake. Following the ridge, the trail has several sharp dips and climbs. Panekire Hut sits in a small clearing next to the Panekire Trig point (1180 m), at the top of the cliffline, with views of the lake.
Panekire Hut	8.8 km	5 hours	Passing the former Armed Constabulary Redoubt near the start of the trail, the track then climbs steeply up onto Panekire Bluff. The bluffs form part of the southern shore, and provide views over the expanse of the lake. Following the ridge, the trail has several sharp dips and climbs. Panekire Hut sits in a small clearing next to the Panekire Trig point (1180 m), at the top of the cliffline, with views of the lake.
Panekire Hut	7.6 km	3–4 hours	The trail from Panekire Hut goes west, climbing and descending over the Panekire Range, before eventually descending precipitously into much taller and wetter forest. At the end of the descent lies Waiopaoa Hut and Campsite, on the edge of the Waiopaoa Inlet part of the lake.
Waiopaoa Hut and Campsite	7.6 km	3–4 hours	The trail from Panekire Hut goes west, climbing and descending over the Panekire Range, before eventually descending precipitously into much taller and wetter forest. At the end of the descent lies Waiopaoa Hut and Campsite, on the edge of the Waiopaoa Inlet part of the lake.
Waiopaoa Hut and Campsite	3.6 km	1.5 hours	Passes grassland, and forest, usually 10–20 m from the lakeshore. Just before Korokoro campsite, there is a turnoff up Korokoro river, to Korokoro Falls which takes about 30 minutes each way.
Korokoro Campsite	3.6 km	1.5 hours	Passes grassland, and forest, usually 10–20 m from the lakeshore. Just before Korokoro campsite, there is a turnoff up Korokoro river, to Korokoro Falls which takes about 30 minutes each way.
Korokoro Campsite	6.8 km	2.5 hours	This section has a very large number of meanders in the trail, as it follows the lakeside, and toward the Maraunui Campsite, follows a river upstream, before crossing it, and returning downstream.
Maraunui Campsite	6.8 km	2.5 hours	This section has a very large number of meanders in the trail, as it follows the lakeside, and toward the Maraunui Campsite, follows a river upstream, before crossing it, and returning downstream.
Maraunui Campsite	1.7 km	0.5 hours	A brief walk through grassland and over a small ridge.
Marauiti Hut and Campsite	1.7 km	0.5 hours	A brief walk through grassland and over a small ridge.
Marauiti Hut and Campsite	6.2 km	2 hours	Apart from a brief climb over a small peninsula, the trail follows the shoreline as it meanders northeast.
Waiharuru Hut and Campsite	6.2 km	2 hours	Apart from a brief climb over a small peninsula, the trail follows the shoreline as it meanders northeast.
Waiharuru Hut and Campsite	2.1 km	1.5 hours	Climbing fairly steeply, the trail crosses the neck of the Puketukutuku Peninsula, touching the edge of the Kiwi Reserve area. Descending the other side of the peninsula, the trail arrives at the Tapuaenui Campsite, back on the lake shore.
Tapuaenui Campsite	2.1 km	1.5 hours	Climbing fairly steeply, the trail crosses the neck of the Puketukutuku Peninsula, touching the edge of the Kiwi Reserve area. Descending the other side of the peninsula, the trail arrives at the Tapuaenui Campsite, back on the lake shore.
Tapuaenui Campsite	3.2 km	1 hour	Again following the shore, the trail meanders along, through forest, before arriving at Whanganui Hut.
Whanganui Hut	3.2 km	1 hour	Again following the shore, the trail meanders along, through forest, before arriving at Whanganui Hut.
Whanganui Hut	2.7 km	0.75 hours	After a short walk through the forest, the trail arrives at the beach where water taxis pick up and set down passengers (they use the rocks on the east end of the beach). Sandflies are a problem whilst waiting here.
Water Taxi Stop	2.7 km	0.75 hours	After a short walk through the forest, the trail arrives at the beach where water taxis pick up and set down passengers (they use the rocks on the east end of the beach). Sandflies are a problem whilst waiting here.
Water Taxi Stop	2.7 km	1.25 hours	
Hopuruahine	2.7 km	1.25 hours	

The Department of Conservation provides very conservative estimates on the hiking time from point to point on the track, and experienced hikers may cover quoted distances in half of the recommended time.

== Transport ==
As this track is not a circuit, transport is needed between the start and end of the trail. Most trampers use the services of one of the local shuttle bus or shuttle boat operators who can deliver and pick up trampers at pre-arranged times. The start and end of the trail are both on State Highway 38.

There is a motor camp at Home Bay (Whanganui o parua Inlet), near the Āniwaniwa Visitor Centre. All the huts/campsites are also accessible by boat, except for Panekire Hut, and there are several boat-ramps along State Highway 38.

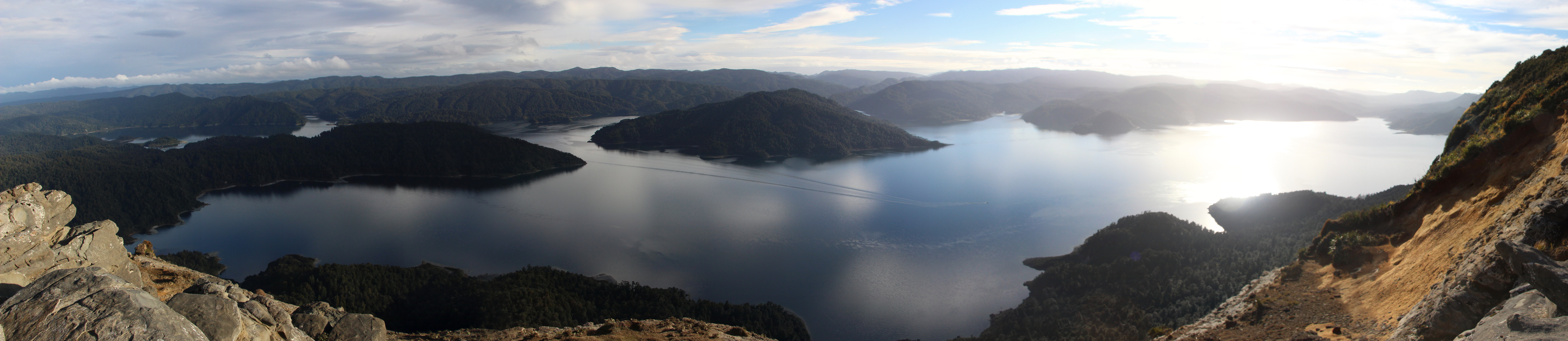
View of Lake Waikaremoana from Panekiri Bluff

== Location ==
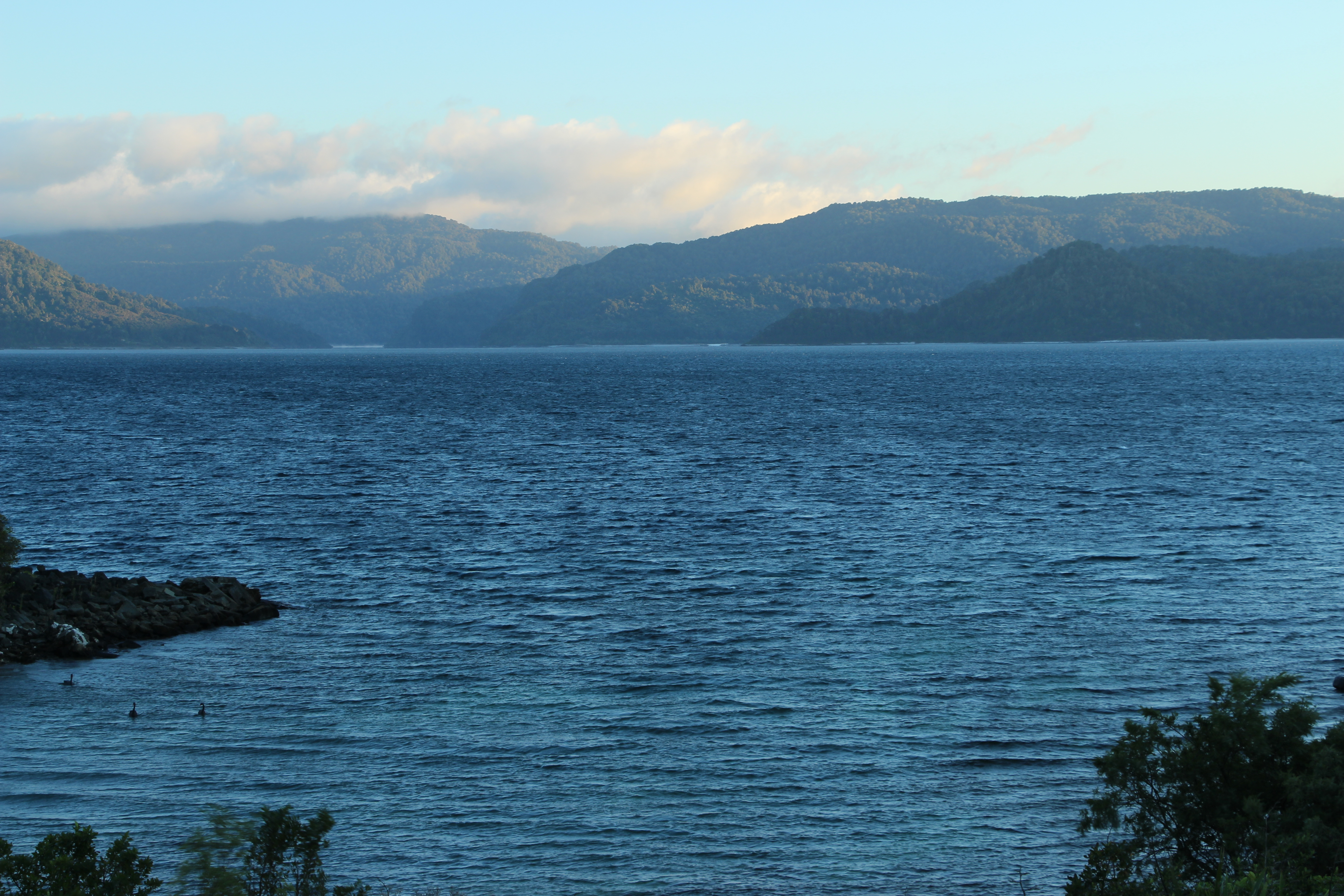
Lake from the car park

The Lake Waikaremoana Great Walk is located within the now-disestablished Te Urewera National Park. The nearest town to the trail is Wairoa, from where there are shuttles on demand to the lake.

Waikaremoana can be approached from two directions. State Highway 38 links Wairoa and the East Coast with the central North Island and passes the lake and the Āniwaniwa Visitor Centre. The highway is unsealed for about 80 kilometres between Murupara and the village of Tuai. There are well-marked side roads to the main boat ramps and Lake Track entrances.
