= Charlie Douglas =

New Zealand surveyor and explorer

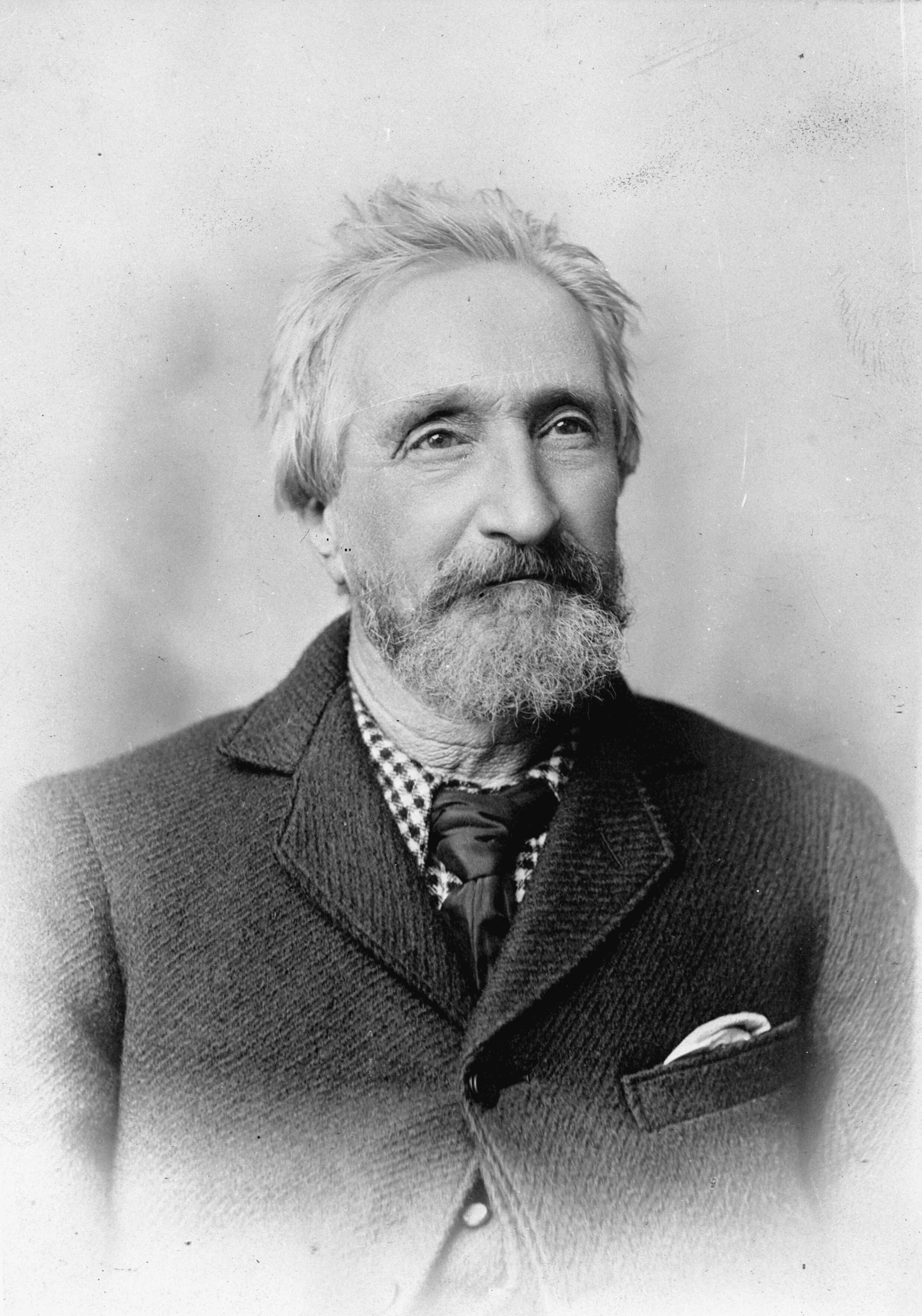
- Douglas, c. 1890
- Born: Charles Edward Douglas; 1 July 1840; Edinburgh, Scotland
- Died: 23 May 1916 (aged 75); Hokitika, New Zealand
- Occupations: Explorer, surveyor
- Relatives: William Fettes Douglas (brother)

Charles Edward Douglas (1 July 1840 – 23 May 1916) was a New Zealand surveyor and explorer, who came to be known as Mr. Explorer Douglas, owing to his extensive explorations of the West Coast of New Zealand and his work for the New Zealand Survey Department. He was awarded the Royal Geographical Society Gill Memorial Prize in 1897.

== Early life and education ==
Douglas was born on 1 July 1840, in Edinburgh, Scotland, the youngest of six children, to parents Martha Brook and James Douglas. His eldest brother was William Fettes Douglas. His father was an accountant with the Commercial Bank of Scotland. Charlie Douglas was educated at the Royal High School and worked at the accountant's office of the Commercial Bank of Scotland from 1857 to 1862. He emigrated to New Zealand, arriving in Port Chalmers in 1862.

For five years, Douglas worked at a variety of jobs, including working on a sheep run, and gold digging. He moved to Ōkārito, Westland, in 1867.

== Exploration ==
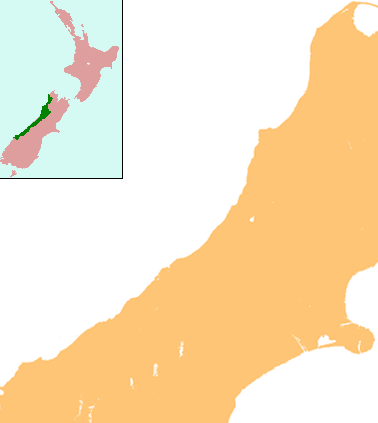
Explorations of Charlie Douglas

For 40 years Douglas explored and surveyed the West Coast Region of New Zealand. He was described as heavily bearded and with a slight frame, standing about 5 feet 10 inches (1.78 m) in height. He was accompanied throughout his years of exploration by a dog, first "Topsy", then "Betsey Jane" and others. During the colonial period of New Zealand, drowning in rivers was so commonplace before bridges had been built that it became known as the 'New Zealand death'. Douglas could not swim, and he once claimed that this fact "had saved his life many a time", implying that he would not enter rivers when it was risky.

When exploring Douglas carried little in the way of equipment beyond some basic provisions, including tobacco for his beloved pipe, and a swag. He camped beneath his two piece "batwing" tent of canvas or calico or crude rock shelters. He supplemented his food stocks by hunting native birds and living off the land. Although Douglas lived simply he supported himself by occasional paid work, supplemented by some infrequent provisions sent by his family in Scotland, who also supplied him with some of the books that he read avidly. He worked for a part-time wage from the survey department for 20 years before becoming a full-time employee from 1889.

Douglas was a quiet, shy man, who was noted for his keen, accurate and entertaining observations relating to flora, fauna (particularly birds) and geology in his journals, sketches, watercolours and survey reports. Later in his life he grew increasingly intolerant of tourists who were unwilling or unable to endure the hardships he experienced. Douglas condemned the changes to the natural landscape he saw occurring in Westland and he became increasingly embittered as old age and illness began to curtail his later explorations. When he was not exploring he was known to be a heavy drinker.

=== 1868–1888 ===
During this 20-year period, both Gerhard Mueller and George John Roberts attempted to employ Douglas full-time at the survey department, but he instead sent in voluntary reports and maps of the rugged Westland valleys that he tramped and explored and earned a part-time wage while exploring for the department.

In 1868, Douglas accompanied Julius von Haast on a month-long expedition travelling down the West Coast, making stops and exploring at: Ōkārito, Bruce Bay, Paringa and Arnott Point before returning to Ōkārito. It is probable that Douglas learned something of geology from Haast at this time because he used Haast's terminology in his later geological notes.

During 1874, Douglas met George Roberts and formed a friendship that was to lead to his growing involvement with the New Zealand Survey Department. Also in 1874, Douglas formed a partnership with Bob Ward and the two men bought 700 acres (280 ha) of land on the Paringa River and began cattle farming. The pair also operated a ferry service across the Paringa. Douglas gave up cattle farming after his partner, Ward, drowned in 1881. After his time as a cattle farmer, Douglas abandoned a settled life and began to tramp and explore Westland, picking up odd-jobs as he needed them.

From a base in Jackson Bay starting in the 1870s Douglas continued to explore the: Paringa River (1874–1877), Haast River (1880) and Landsborough River, Blue River (1881), Turnbull River (1882), Okuru River (1882) and associated passes the Actor and Maori (1883), Cascade River with Mueller (1883) and Arawhata River (1883), travelling with Mueller and Roberts on the "Reconnaissance Survey" from Jackson Bay to Martins Bay (1884).

In 1885, Douglas accompanied the chief surveyor, Mueller, exploring the Arawhata River valley. Together, they traced one tributary of the Arawhata, the Williamson River to the Andy Glacier. The other branch, the Waipara River they traced to the Bonar Glacier on the west slope of Mount Aspiring. During this journey they accomplished the summiting of 7,390 foot (2,250 m) Mount Ionia.

In 1886, Douglas and G. T. Murray made a survey trip to the Northern Olivines.

During 1887, Douglas and Mueller made a "Reconnaissance Survey" of the Clarke River and the Landsborough River.

In 1887 and later in 1888, Charlie Douglas visited the Balfour Glacier near Mount Tasman and the Fox Glacier.

==== Two immense raptors ====
Douglas claims in his monograph on the birds of South Westland (c. 1899) that he shot and ate two raptors of immense size on the Haast River valley or Landsborough River (possibly during the late 1870s or 1880s):

The expanse of wing of this bird will scarcely be believed. I shot two on the Haast, one was 8 feet 4 inches (2.54 m) from tip to tip, the other was 6 feet 9 inches (2.06 m), but with all their expanse of wing they have very little lifting power, as a large hawk can only lift a duck for a few feet, so no one need get up any of those legends about birds carrying babies out of cradles, as the eagle is accussed [sic] of doing.

In light of Douglas' generally trustworthy, detailed observations and measurements as a surveyor, it has been hypothesised by paleozoologist, Trevor H. Worthy, that the dead birds may have represented a biological relict or remnant of the otherwise extinct Haast's eagle.

=== 1889–1903 ===
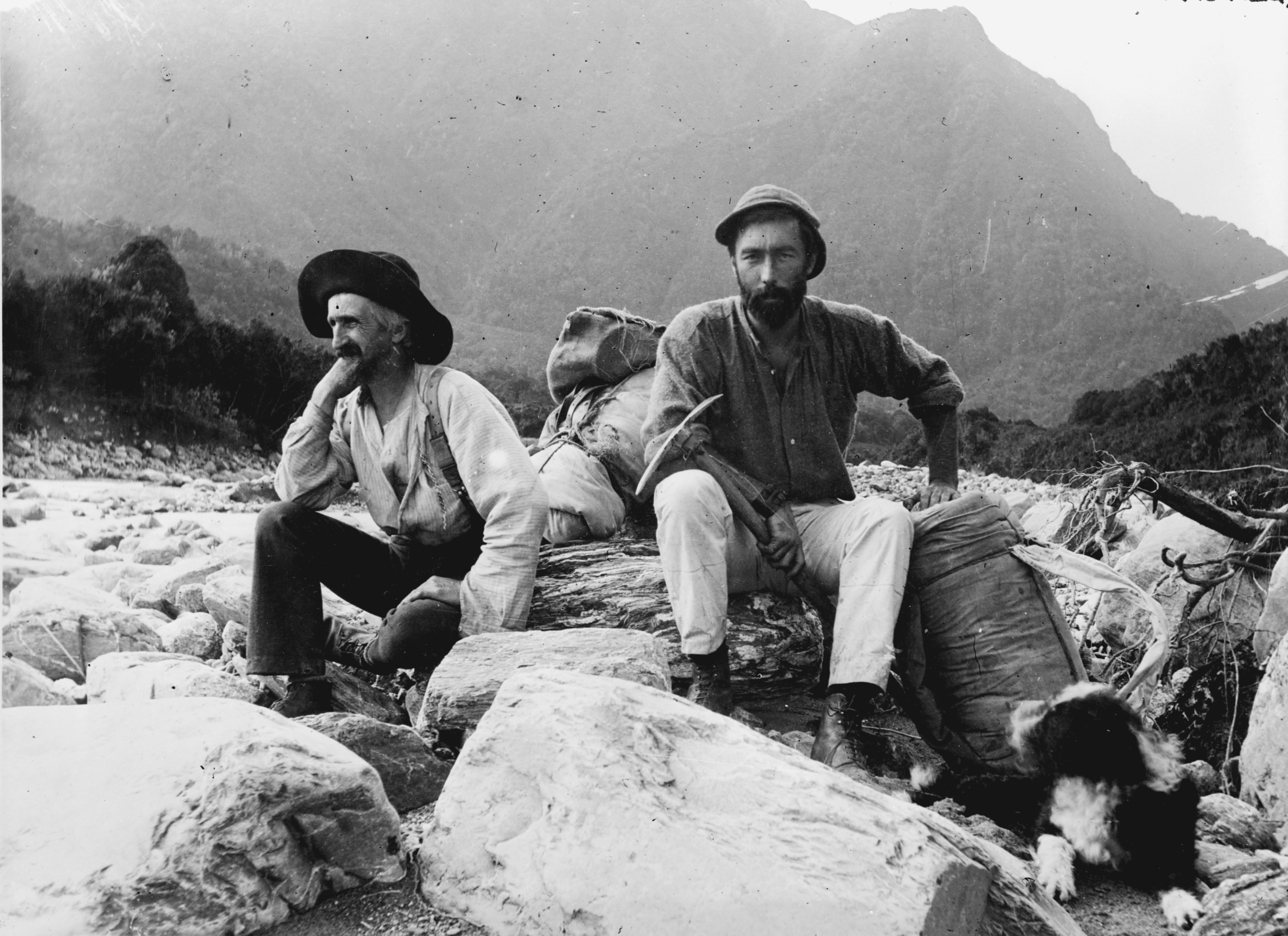
Charlie Douglas (left), Arthur Paul Harper, and Douglas' dog Betsey Jane in the valley of the Cook River in 1894

From 1889 Douglas agreed to work for the survey department full-time for a wage of eight shillings a day. He was provided with: a prismatic compass, a survey chain and drawing tools.

For five months, in 1891 Douglas travelled up the Waiatoto River. He climbed Mount Ragan and reached the Therma Glacier at the head of the Waiatoto.

During 1892 Douglas made an important expedition up the Copland River. It was during the Copland trip that he experienced the first real illness of his 52 years. Later in the year he explored the Whitcombe River.

Between 1893 and 1895, Douglas was teamed with Arthur Paul Harper and the two first explored the Wanganui River in a dug-out canoe. They then explored the Franz Josef Glacier, Fox Glacier and in 1894 the area of the Cook River. It was in 1894 that rheumatism first began to force Douglas to curtail some of his exploration.

In 1896, Douglas returned to the Whitcombe River valley and crossed the Whitcombe Pass to the upper Rakaia.

In 1897, Douglas continued track work in the Whitcombe River. It was also in this year that he was awarded the Royal Geographical Society Gill Memorial Prize. He spent the prize money on a camera that he ended up giving away.

From 1898 through to 1899, Douglas worked on hut making and track cutting around the glaciers and along the Whitcombe River valley.

In 1900, Douglas made his last major expedition along the Wanganui River that included a trip to the Lord Range.

In 1901, Douglas explored the Ōtira River and from 1903 he explored the Ōkārito district. He increasingly suffered from ill health.

== Later life: 1904–1916 ==
From 1904 to 1906, Douglas continued to explore and survey for the department but was increasingly restricted by illness and old age. In 1906, while on holiday in Whataroa, Douglas met and was photographed with Richard Seddon, shortly before Seddon's death. Later in 1906 Douglas suffered his first stroke. He continued to explore for the department in 1907 and 1908 but his second stroke forced him to retire from the New Zealand Survey Department after 40 years of almost continual exploration of the West Coast Region.

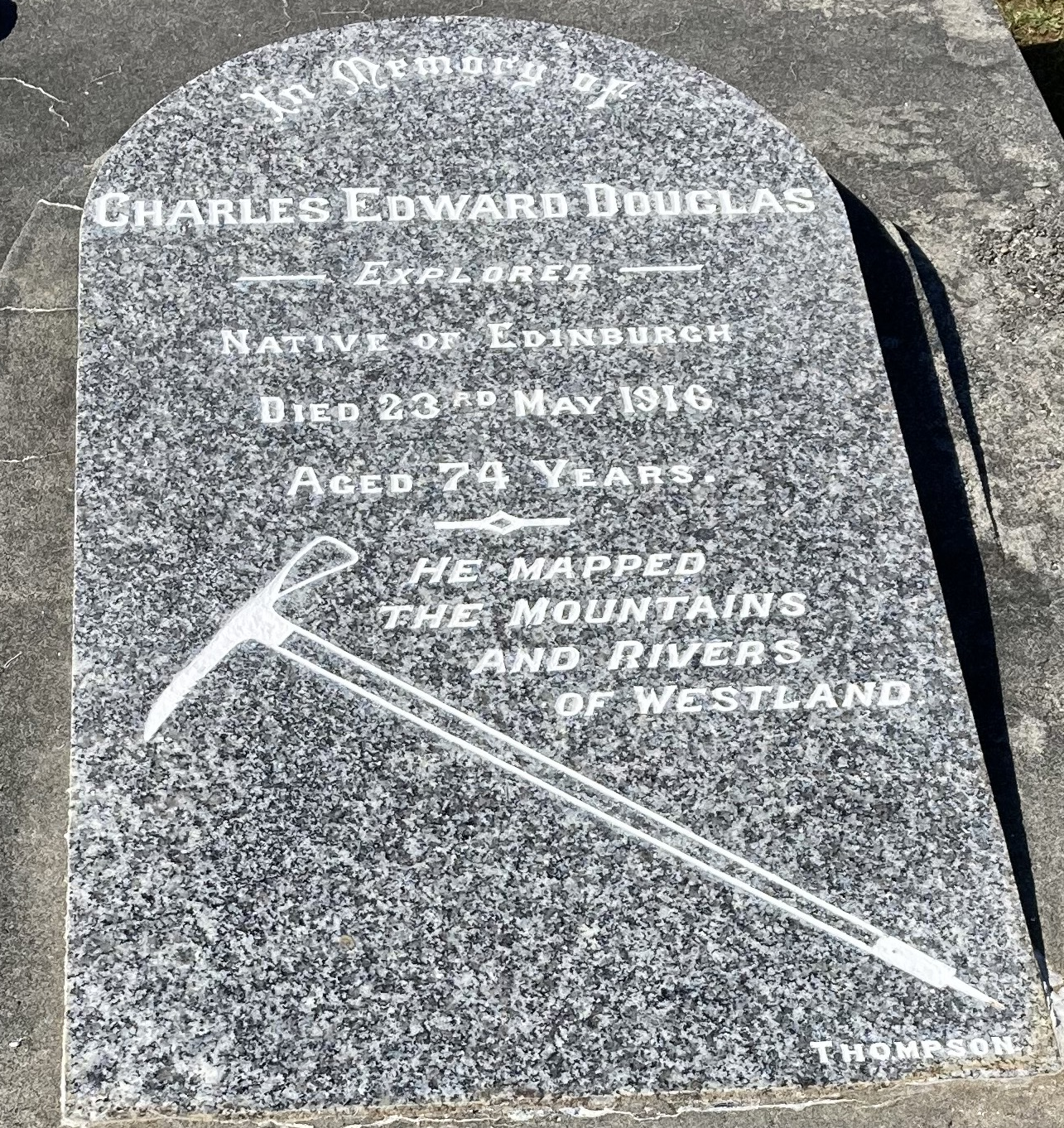
Douglas's gravestone in Hokitika Cemetery

Douglas spent much of his time from 1906 until 1916 being looked after by friends and Mrs. Ward, the widow of his farming partner. He was also in and out of hospital in 1911, 1914 and 1916, where he was attended by Ebenezer Teichelmann. Douglas died, two months short of his 76th birthday, of a cerebral haemorrhage in the Westland Hospital on 23 May 1916, and was buried in Hokitika Cemetery.

== Known works ==
The following works by Douglas were published, exhibited or are held and collected:

- Contributed to the Appendix to the Journal of the House of Representatives
- Exhibited an oil painting at the New Zealand and South Seas Exhibition (1889)
- Journals and sketchbook are held at the Alexander Turnbull Library
- Watercolours and washes are held at the Hocken Collections
- Sketches are held at the Hokitika Museum

== Awards ==
Douglas was awarded the 1897 Royal Geographical Society Gill Memorial Prize for "persistent explorations during twenty-one years of the difficult region of forests and gorges on the western slopes of the New Zealand Alps".

== Landmarks ==
The following New Zealand landmarks are named after Douglas:

- Mount Douglas at the head of Fox Glacier
- Douglas pass through the Hooker range
- Douglas River
- Douglas Névé and Glacier west of Mount Sefton
- Douglas Rock Hut Copland Valley
