= Mount Head (New Zealand) =

Mountain in New Zealand

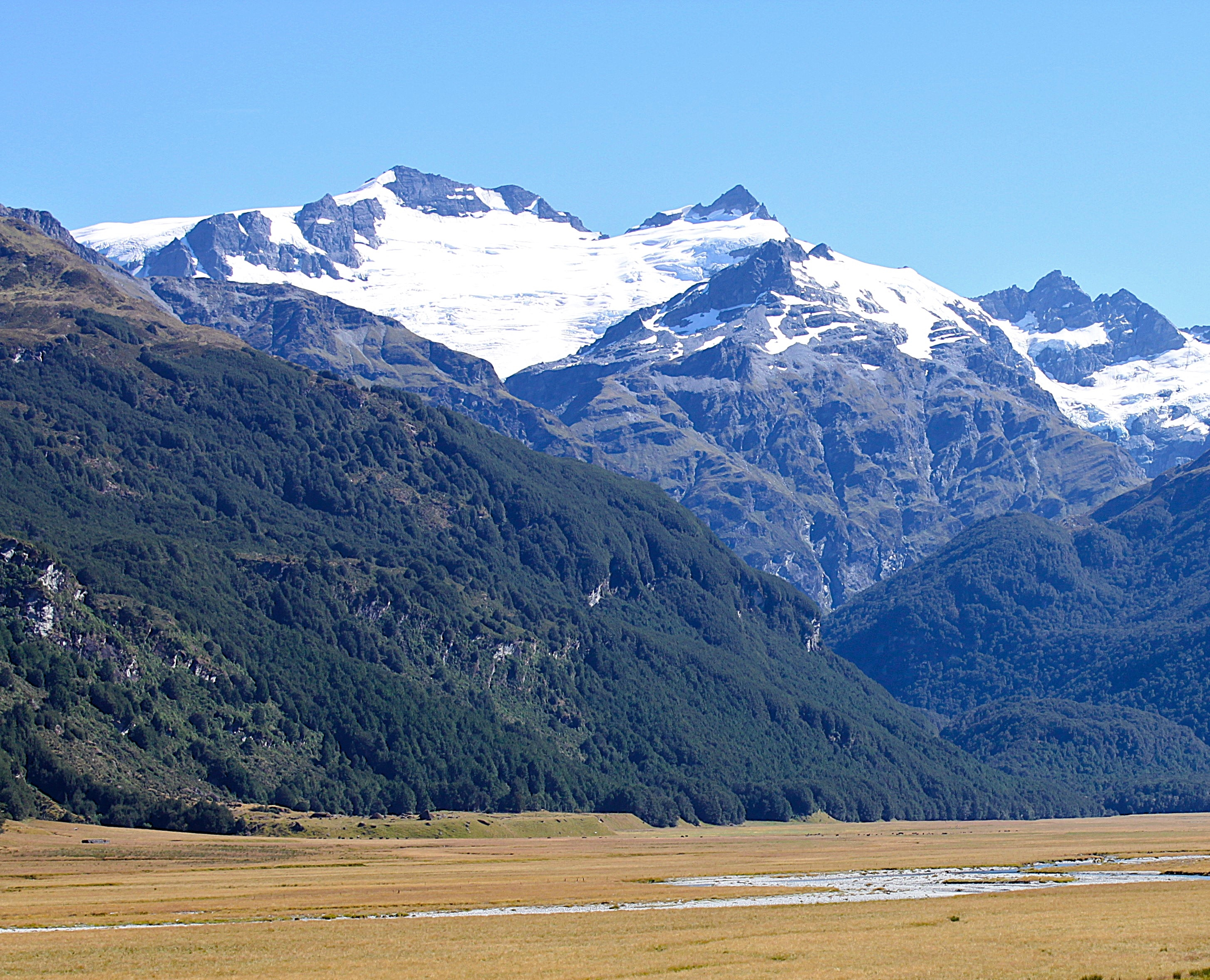
- South aspect

Highest point
- Elevation: 2,585 m (8,481 ft)
- Prominence: 465 m (1,526 ft)
- Isolation: 4.47 km (2.78 mi)
- Listing: Highest mountains of New Zealand
- Coordinates: 44.556457°S 168.429809°E

Naming
- Etymology: Major Bernard Head

Geography
- Location within New Zealand
- Interactive map of Mount Head
- Location: South Island
- Country: New Zealand
- Region: Otago
- Protected area: Mount Aspiring National Park
- Parent range: Southern Alps; Forbes Mountains
- Topo map(s): NZMS260 E40; Topo50 CA10

Climbing
- First ascent: March 1914, Hugh Francis Wright

Mount Head is a 2,585-metre-elevation (8,481-foot) mountain in Otago, New Zealand.

== Description ==
Mount Head is located 30 kilometres southwest of Mount Aspiring / Tititea in the Southern Alps of the South Island. It is set within Mount Aspiring National Park which is part of the Te Wahipounamu UNESCO World Heritage Site. The peak is part of the Forbes Mountains which are a subrange of the Southern Alps. Precipitation runoff from the mountain's slopes drains north to the Dart River / Te Awa Whakatipu, and south to the Rees River via Hunter Creek. Topographic relief is significant as the summit rises 2,000 metres (6,562 feet) above the Dart Valley in three kilometres. The nearest higher neighbour is Sir William Peak, four kilometres to the south. Mount Clarke is four km east.

== Bernard Head ==
Bernard Head (1876–1915) made the first ascent of Mount Aspiring / Tititea on 23 November 1909 with guides Jack Clarke and Alec Graham. He was also the first to climb Mount Edward in 1914. Major Bernard Head was killed in action on 12 August 1915 while serving with the Royal Welch Fusiliers during World War I.

== Climate ==
Based on the Köppen climate classification, Mount Head is located in a marine west coast climate zone, with a subpolar oceanic climate (Cfc) at the summit. Prevailing westerly winds blow moist air from the Tasman Sea onto the mountain, where the air is forced upwards by the mountains (orographic lift), causing moisture to drop in the form of rain and snow. This climate supports the Jura and Grant glaciers on the south slopes of the mountain. The months of December through February offer the most favourable weather for viewing or climbing this peak.

== Climbing ==
Climbing routes:

- North East Ridge
- West Ridge

== See also ==
- List of mountains of New Zealand by height
