= Joe River =

Joe River may refer to:

- Joe River (New Zealand), a tributary of the Arawhata River
- Joe River (Minnesota), a tributary of the Red River of the North
