= Jackson Head to Stafford River Important Bird Area =

Coordinates: 43°58′30″S 168°34′30″E

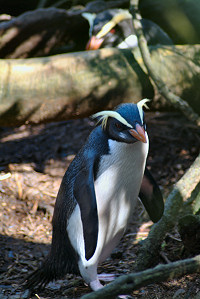
The coast is an important breeding site for Fiordland penguins

The Jackson Head to Stafford River Important Bird Area is a stretch of coastline on the West Coast of New Zealand's South Island. It extends from Jackson Head, at the western end of Jackson Bay, for about 10 kilometres (6.2 mi) westwards to the mouth of the Stafford River. It has been identified as an Important Bird Area because it supports a breeding population of Fiordland penguins.
