= Jackson River (New Zealand) =

River in New Zealand

Coordinates: 44°03′S 168°43′E

Location
- Country: New Zealand

Physical characteristics
- Source
  - location: Olivine Range
- Mouth
  - location: Arawhata River
- Length: 21 km (13 mi)

The Jackson River is a river of the southwestern South Island of New Zealand. It flows predominantly northeast, flowing into the Arawhata River close to the latter's outflow into Jackson Bay.

== See also ==
- List of rivers of New Zealand
