= Mount Head =

Mount Head may refer to:

- Mount Head (Alberta), a mountain in Canada's Lineham Range
- Mount Head (New Zealand), a mountain in New Zealand's Forbes Mountains
- Mt. Head, a 2002 Japanese animated film
