= Williamson River =

Williamson River may refer to:

- Williamson River (Oregon)
- Williamson River (New Zealand)
