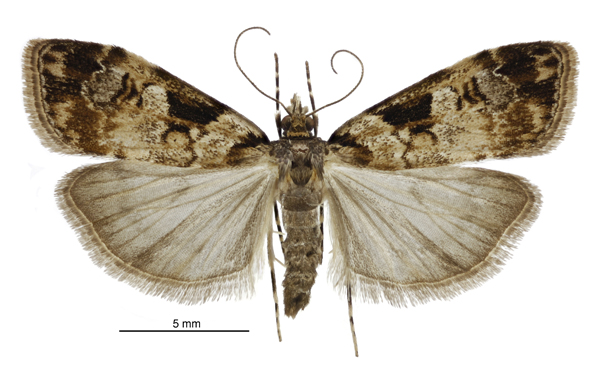
- Female
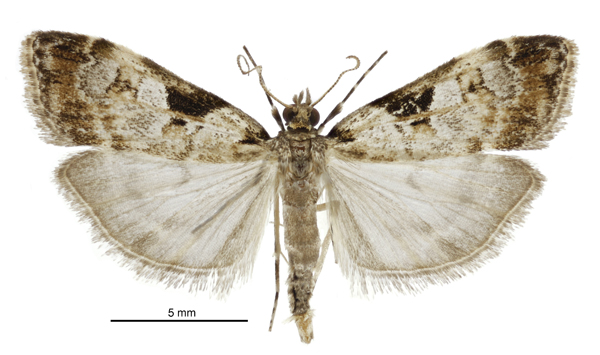
- Male

Scientific classification
- Kingdom: Animalia
- Phylum: Arthropoda
- Clade: Pancrustacea
- Class: Insecta
- Order: Lepidoptera
- Family: Crambidae
- Genus: Scoparia
- Species: S. acharis

Binomial name
- Scoparia acharis Meyrick, 1884

= Scoparia acharis =

Species of moth, endemic to New Zealand

Scoparia acharis is a moth of the family Crambidae. It was named by Edward Meyrick in 1884. This species is endemic to New Zealand and has been observed in both the North and South Islands. The preferred habitat of this species is native forest and in the South Island S. acharis has been observed in beech forest. The larval host of this species is moss. Adults are most commonly on the wing from November to January, although this species has been observed from October until March.

== Taxonomy ==
This species was first mentioned by Edward Meyrick in 1884 and in May 1885 was given a fuller description. For this description Meyrick used two specimens collected at Akaroa and Dunedin amongst native forest in January. In 1928 George Hudson discussed and illustrated this species in his publication The butterflies and moths of New Zealand. The male lectotype, collected in Akaroa, is held at the Natural History Museum, London.

== Description ==
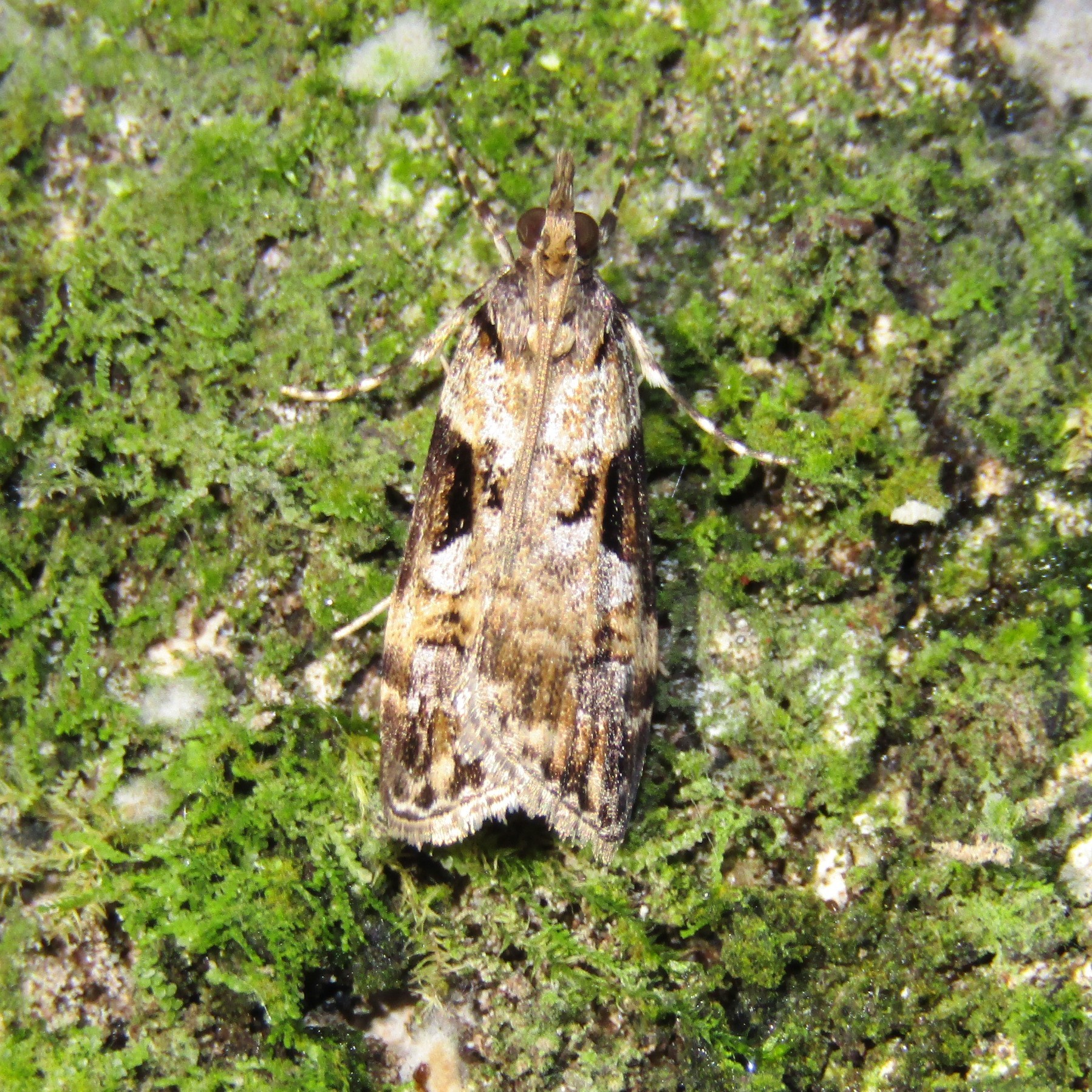

The eggs of this species are oval in shape and are laid flat in groups of two or three. The egg is approximately 0.4 mm in length and is green in colour with an iridescent sheen. The surface is ridged and roughened.

The wingspan is 17.5 mm. The forewings are whitish-ochreous, irrorated with fuscous and dark fuscous. There is a sharply defined oblique black spot from the base of the costa. The first line is indicated only by an obscure dark posterior margin, followed on the costa by a sharply defined moderate triangular black spot. The terminal area is suffused with brownish-ochreous and there is a cloudy, ochreous-whitish subterminal line with a row of ochreous-whitish marks. The hindwings are very pale whitish grey.

This species is distinctive in appearance with sharply defined black costal markings, double reniform and relatively long antennal ciliations.

== Distribution ==
This species is endemic to New Zealand. It has been observed throughout the North and South Islands including at Kaeo, Ohakune, in the Tararua Ranges, Kaitoke, Wellington, Akaroa, Otira, Dunedin, Lake Wakatipu, and Invercargill.

== Habitat ==
This species inhabits native forest. S. acharis has also been observed in beech forest at Mt Aspiring Station where the species is restricted to alpine habitat. The larval host of this species is moss.

== Behaviour ==
Adults have most commonly been recorded on wing from November to January, although this species has been observed from October until March. This species is attracted to light.
