= Mount Ian =

Mountain in Otago, New Zealand

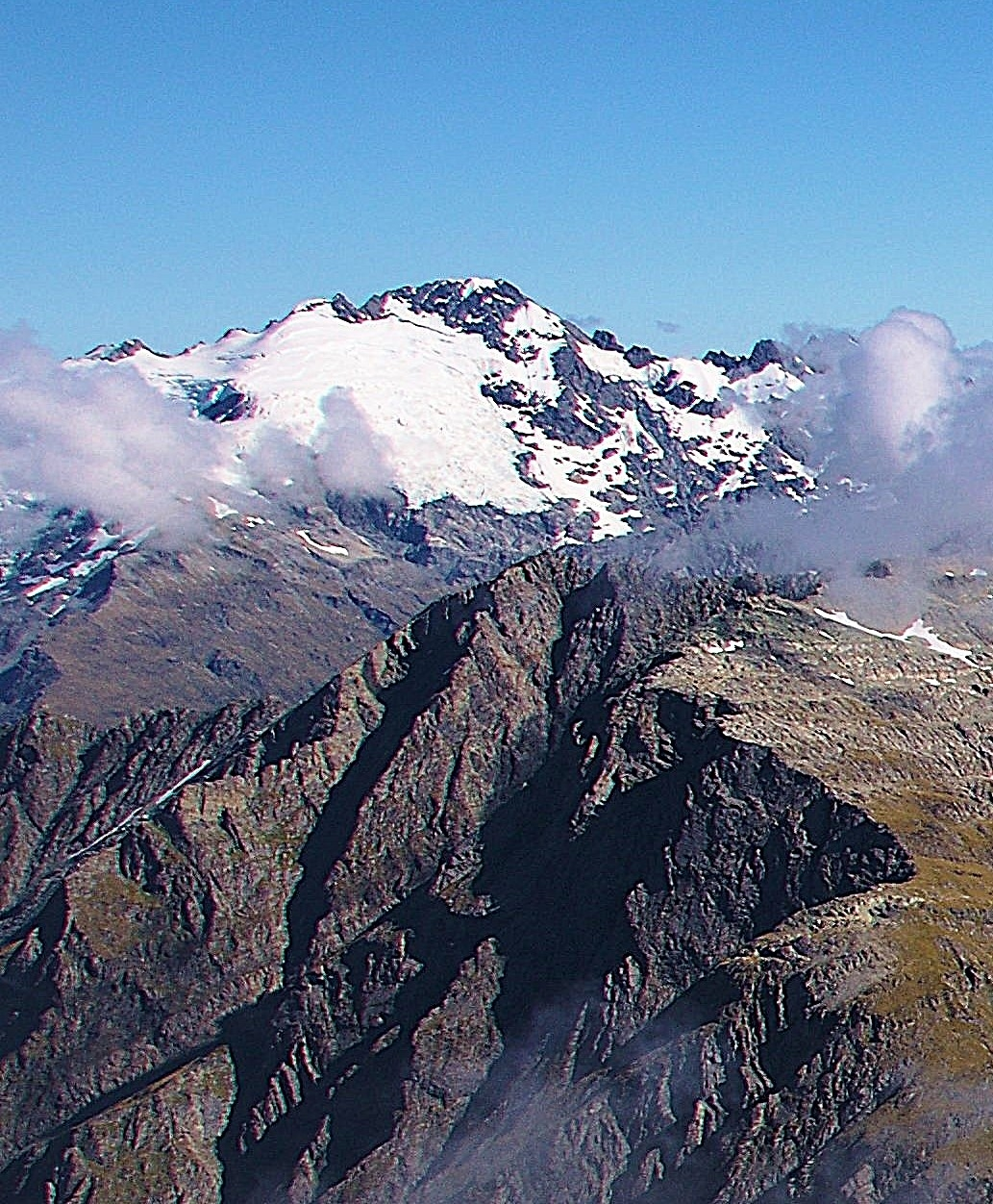
- South aspect

Highest point
- Elevation: 2,502 m (8,209 ft)
- Prominence: 414 m (1,358 ft)
- Isolation: 3.18 km (1.98 mi)
- Listing: New Zealand #73
- Coordinates: 44.485148°S 168.476779°E

Geography
- Location within New Zealand
- Interactive map of Mount Ian
- Location: South Island
- Country: New Zealand
- Region: West Coast / Otago
- Protected area: Mount Aspiring National Park
- Parent range: Southern Alps; Snowdrift Range
- Topo map(s): NZMS260 E39; Topo50 CA10

Climbing
- First ascent: 1914

Mount Ian is a 2,502-metre-elevation (8,209-foot) mountain in New Zealand.

== Description ==
Mount Ian is located 22 kilometres southwest of Mount Aspiring / Tititea in the Southern Alps. The summit is set on the boundary shared by the Otago and West Coast Regions of the South Island. It is also within Mount Aspiring National Park which is part of the Te Wahipounamu UNESCO World Heritage Site. Precipitation runoff from the mountain's south slope drains to the Dart River / Te Awa Whakatipu, whereas the north slope drains to the Joe River. Topographic relief is significant as the summit rises 1,900 metres (6,234 feet) above the Dart River Valley in four kilometres. The nearest higher neighbour is Mount Lydia, three kilometres to the northeast.

== Climate ==
Based on the Köppen climate classification, Mount Ian is located in a marine west coast climate zone, with a subpolar oceanic climate (Cfc) at the summit. Prevailing westerly winds blow moist air from the Tasman Sea onto the mountain, where the air is forced upwards by the mountains (orographic lift), causing moisture to drop in the form of rain and snow. This climate supports the Hamilton, Victoria, Blue Duck, and Snowball glaciers surrounding the mountain. The months of December through February offer the most favourable weather for viewing or climbing this peak.

== Climbing ==
The first ascent of the summit was made on 1 March 1914 by Hugh Francis Wright.

Climbing routes:

- Via Boys Col
- Alternative Route

== Gallery ==
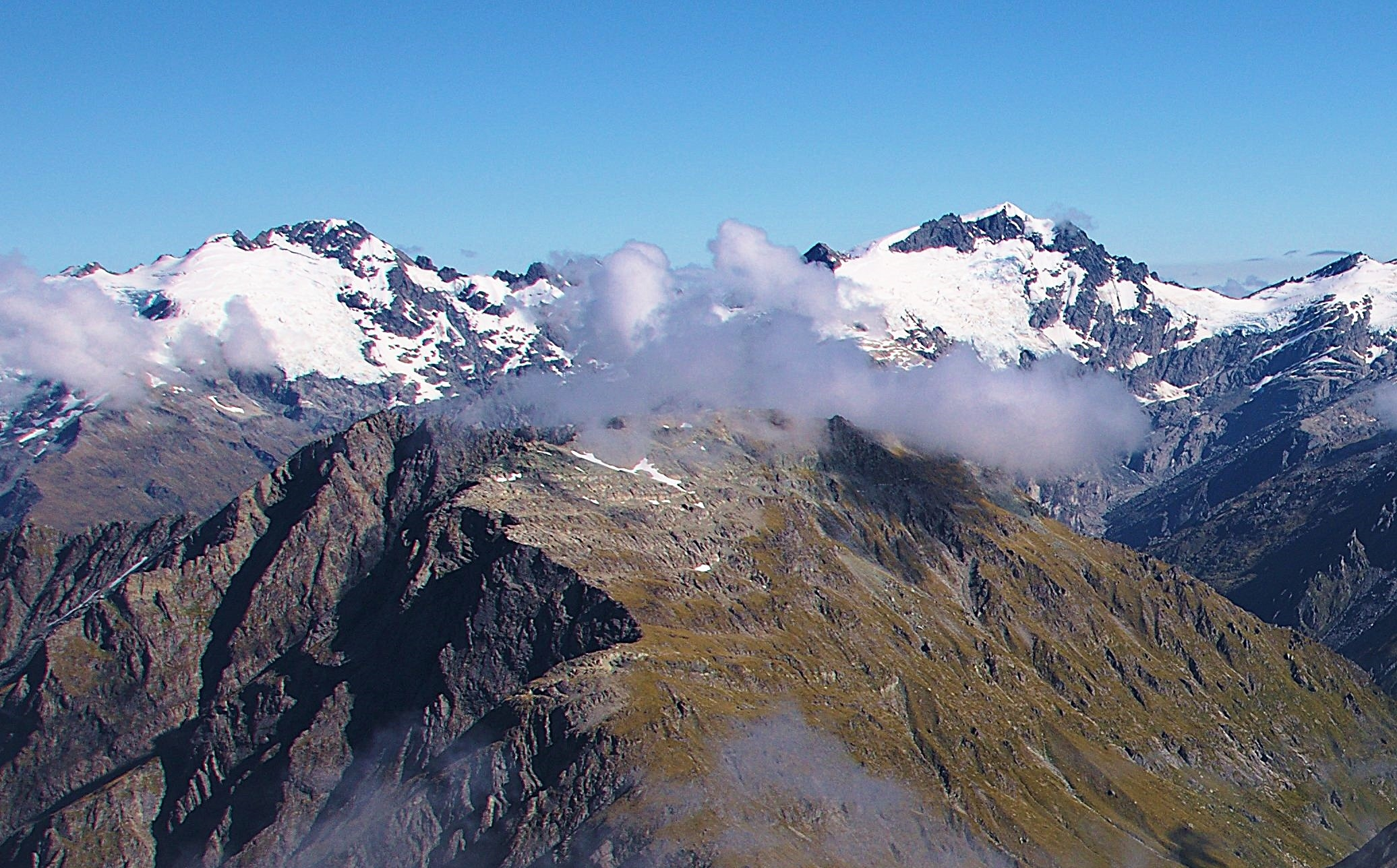
Mount Ian (left) and Mount Lydia (right)

== See also ==
- List of mountains of New Zealand by height
