= Mount Edward (New Zealand) =

Mountain in Otago, New Zealand

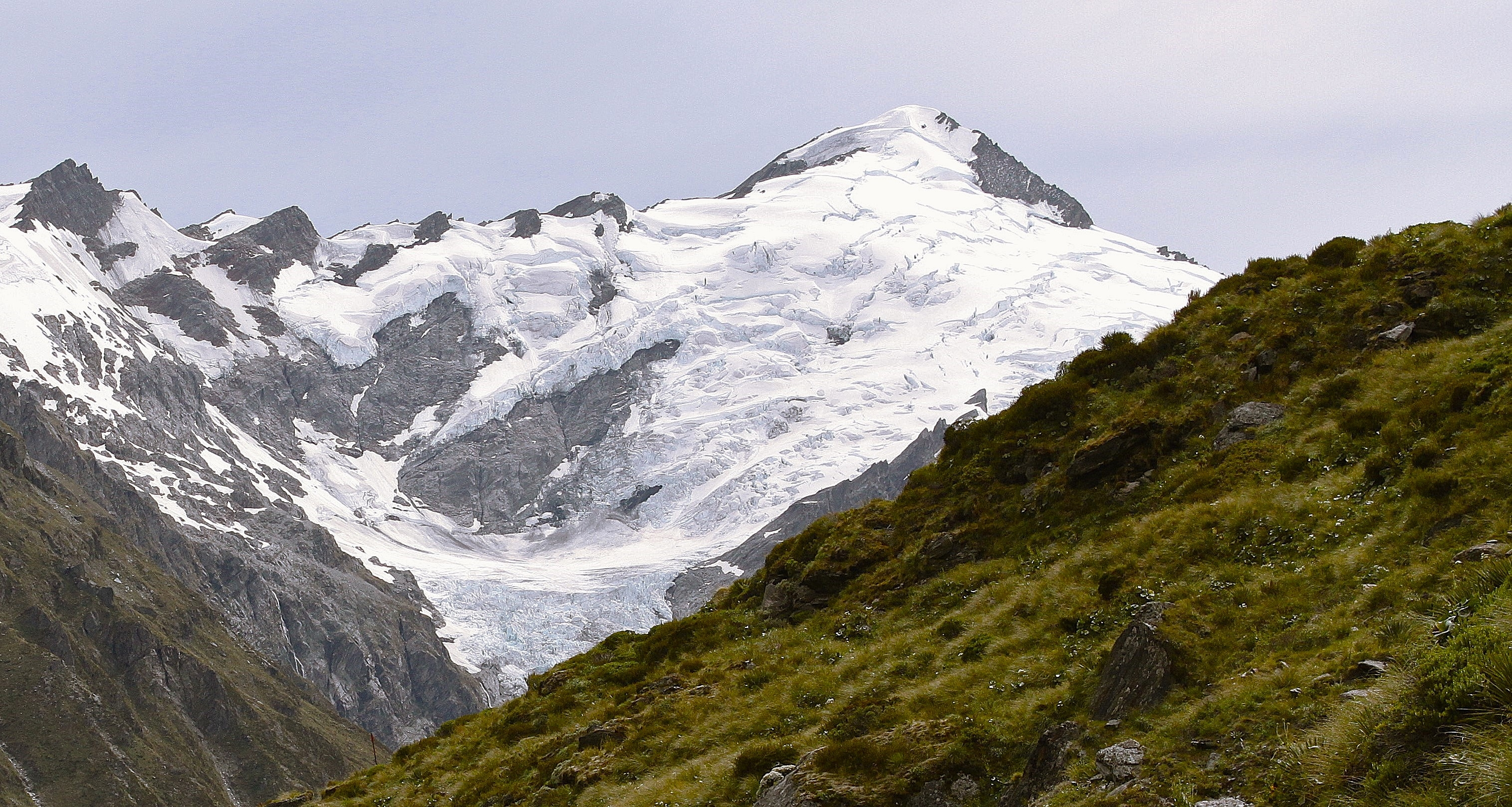
- South aspect

Highest point
- Elevation: 2,620 m (8,596 ft)
- Prominence: 1,122 m (3,681 ft)
- Isolation: 11.1 km (6.9 mi)
- Listing: Highest mountains of New Zealand
- Coordinates: 44.466428°S 168.58464°E

Naming
- Native name: Makairohia (Māori)

Geography
- Location within New Zealand
- Interactive map of Mount Edward
- Location: South Island
- Country: New Zealand
- Region: Otago
- Protected area: Mount Aspiring National Park
- Parent range: Southern Alps; Snowdrift Range
- Topo map(s): NZMS260 E39; Topo50 CA10

Geology
- Rock type: Metamorphic rock (pelitic schist)

Climbing
- First ascent: 1914

Mount Edward (Māori: Makairohia) is a 2,620-metre-elevation (8,596-foot) mountain in Otago, New Zealand.

== Description ==
Mount Edward is located 14.6 kilometres southwest of Mount Aspiring / Tititea in the Southern Alps of the South Island. It is set within Mount Aspiring National Park which is part of the Te Wahipounamu UNESCO World Heritage Site. Precipitation runoff from the mountain's slopes drains to the Dart River / Te Awa Whakatipu. Topographic relief is significant as the summit rises 1,600 metres (5,249 feet) above the headwaters of this river in two kilometres. The nearest higher neighbour is Rob Roy Peak, 11 kilometres to the east.

== Climate ==
Based on the Köppen climate classification, Mount Edward is located in a marine west coast climate zone, with a subpolar oceanic climate (Cfc) at the summit. Prevailing westerly winds blow moist air from the Tasman Sea onto the mountain, where the air is forced upwards by the mountains (orographic lift), causing moisture to drop in the form of rain and snow. This climate supports the Dart, Marshall, Hesse, and Whitbourn glaciers surrounding the mountain. The months of December through February offer the most favourable weather for viewing or climbing this peak.

== Climbing ==
Climbing routes:

- Whitbourn Glacier – Bernard Head, Jack Clarke, Colin Ferrier – 1914 – First ascent route
- East Ridge – Stafford Morse, Russell Fisher
- Via Marshall Glacier
- Via Whitbourn Saddle

== Gallery ==
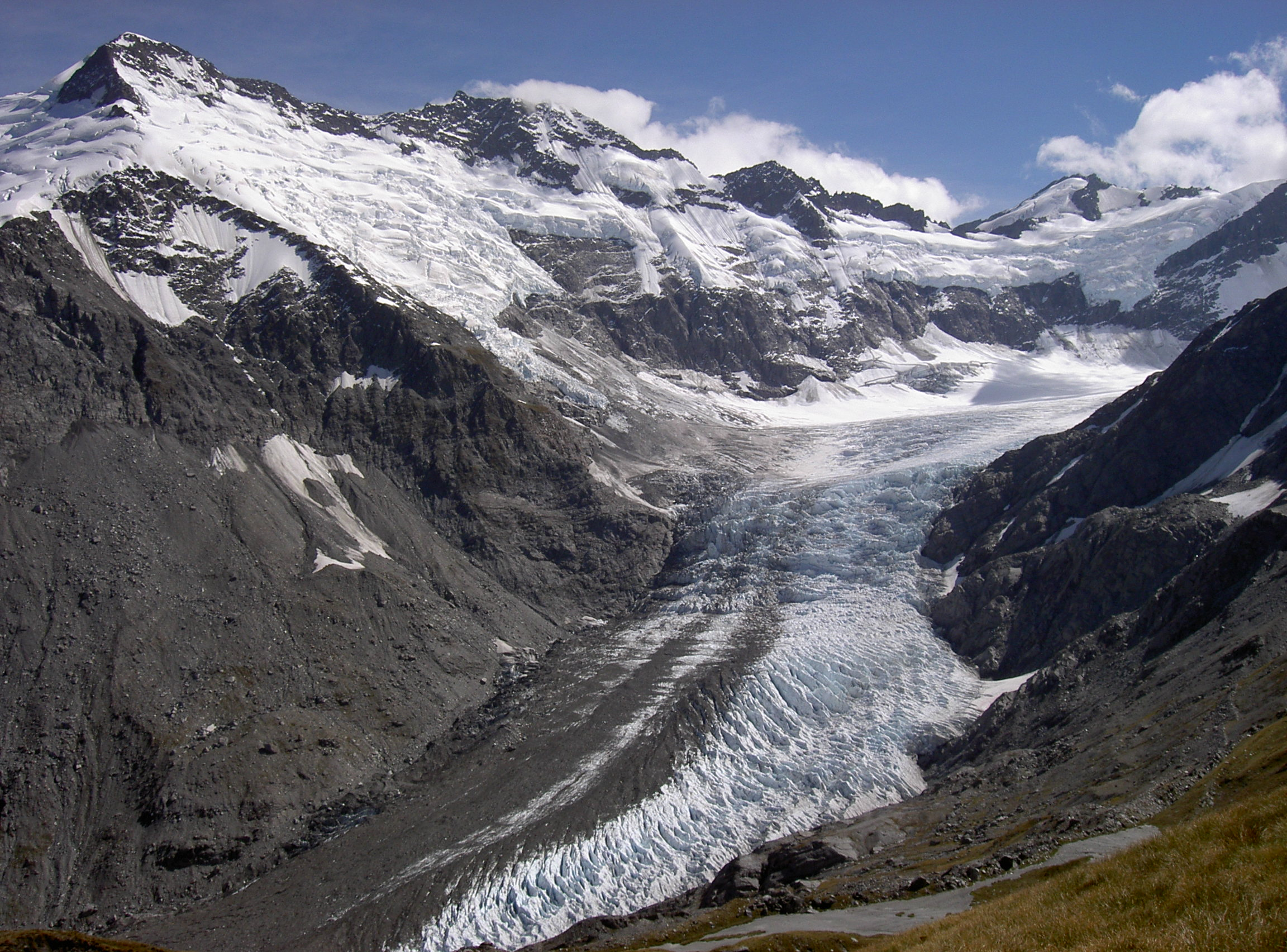
Mount Edward (upper left corner) and the Dart Glacier

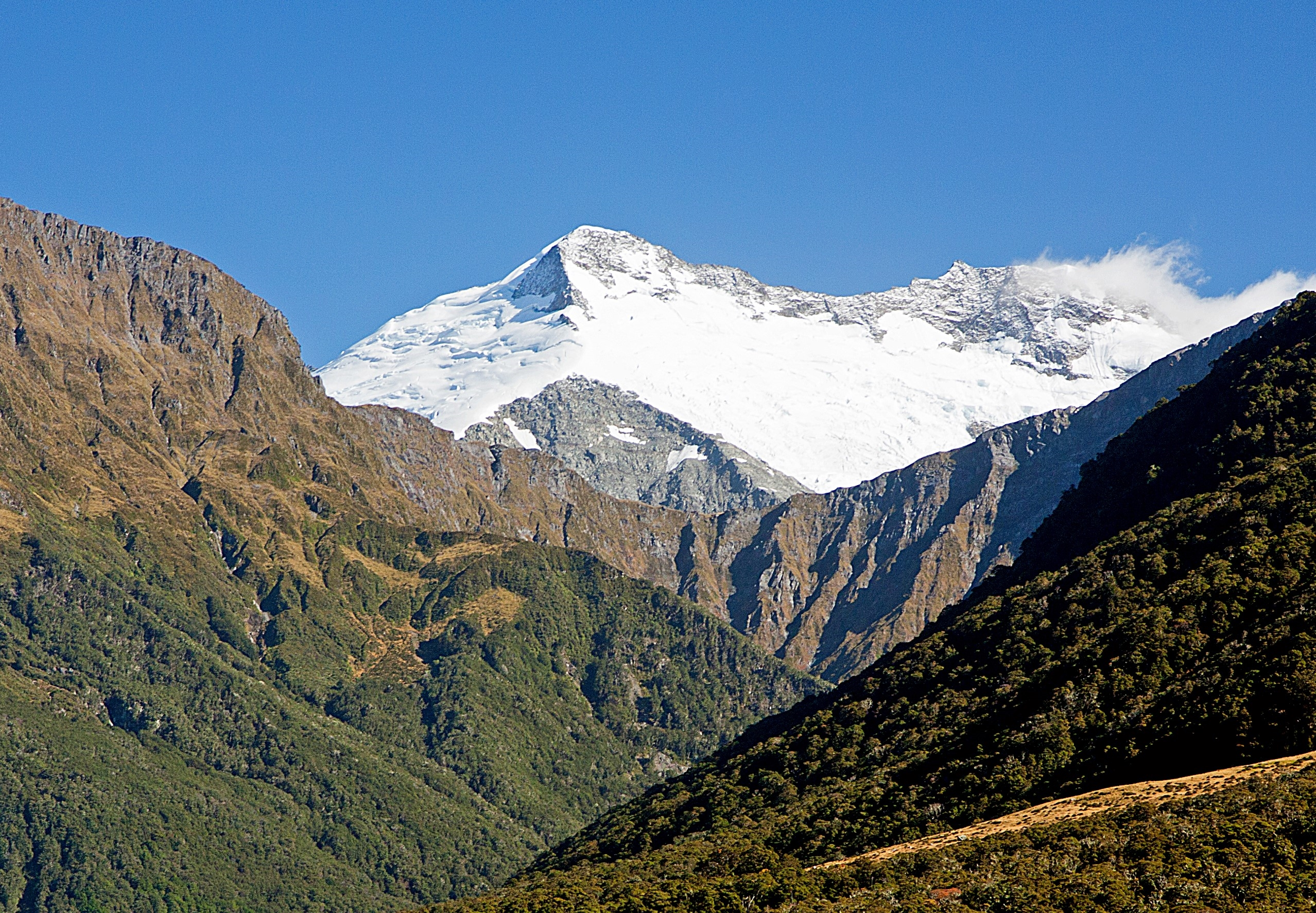
East aspect

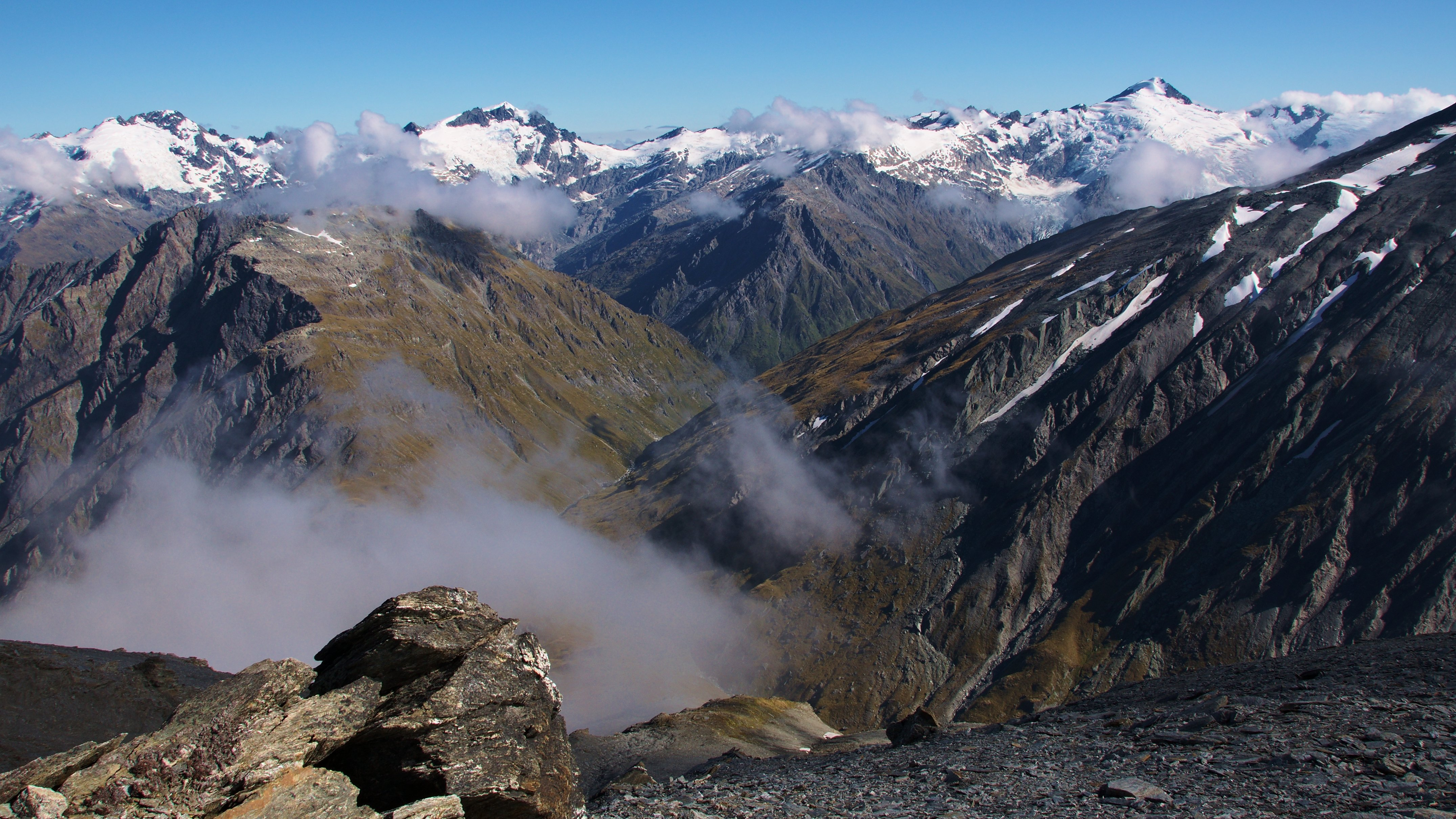
Snowdrift Range on skyline. Edward in upper right. Ian and Lydia to left.

== See also ==
- Edward Dobson
- List of mountains of New Zealand by height
