= Waipara River =

Waipara River may refer to the following New Zealand rivers:

- Waipara River (Canterbury)
- Waipara River (West Coast)
