= Ngatau River =

River in New Zealand

- Route of the Ngatau River
- Mouth of the Ngatau River Ngatau River (New Zealand)

Location
- Country: New Zealand
- Region: West Coast
- District: Westland

Physical characteristics
- Source: Dispute Glacier
  - coordinates: 44.1084°S 169.0018°E
- Mouth
  - location: Okuru River
  - coordinates: 44°03′10″S 169°08′47″E
- Length: 15 km (9 mi)

Basin features
- Progression: Ngatau River → Okuru River → Tasman Sea
- Tributaries
  - left: Dernier Torrent, Shale Stream, Deepworn Torrent, Twinkle Brook, Tinkle Rill
  - right: Ultima Creek, Flicker Creek

The Ngatau River is a river of the West Coast region of New Zealand's South Island. It flows north-west from its sources in the Southern Alps to meet the Okuru River 20 kilometres (12 mi) south-east of Haast. The river's entire length is within Mount Aspiring National Park.

== See also ==
- List of rivers of New Zealand
