= Mueller River =

River in New Zealand

- Route of the Mueller River
- Mouth of the Mueller River Mueller River (New Zealand)
- Etymology: Named after Ferdinand von Mueller

Location
- Country: New Zealand
- Region: West Coast
- District: Westland

Physical characteristics
- Source: Dispute Glacier
  - coordinates: 44.1377°S 168.9652°E
- Mouth
  - location: Turnbull River
  - coordinates: 44°01′59″S 168°58′28″E
- Length: 17 kilometres (11 mi)

Basin features
- Progression: Mueller River → Turnbull River → Tasman Sea
- Tributaries
  - left: Emily Torrent, Icicle Creek, Neverfail Creek, Solitude Torrent, Mistake Creek
  - right: Betsy Jane Creek, Turmoil Torrent, Tiny Brook, Deep-Down Creek

The Mueller River is a river of the West Coast Region of New Zealand's South Island. It flows generally north from its sources in the Southern Alps, reaching the Turnbull River 14 kilometres from the latter's mouth. The entire length of the Mueller River is within Mount Aspiring National Park.

== See also ==
- List of rivers of New Zealand
