= Stafford River =

River in New Zealand

Coordinates: 44°00′S 168°33′E

Location
- Country: New Zealand

Physical characteristics
- Mouth
  - location: Tasman Sea
- Length: 10 km (6.2 mi)

The Stafford River is a river of the West Coast Region of New Zealand's South Island. It flows north, reaching the Tasman Sea 10 kilometres west of the western end of Jackson Bay.

== See also ==
- List of rivers of New Zealand
