= Sir William Peak =

Mountain in New Zealand

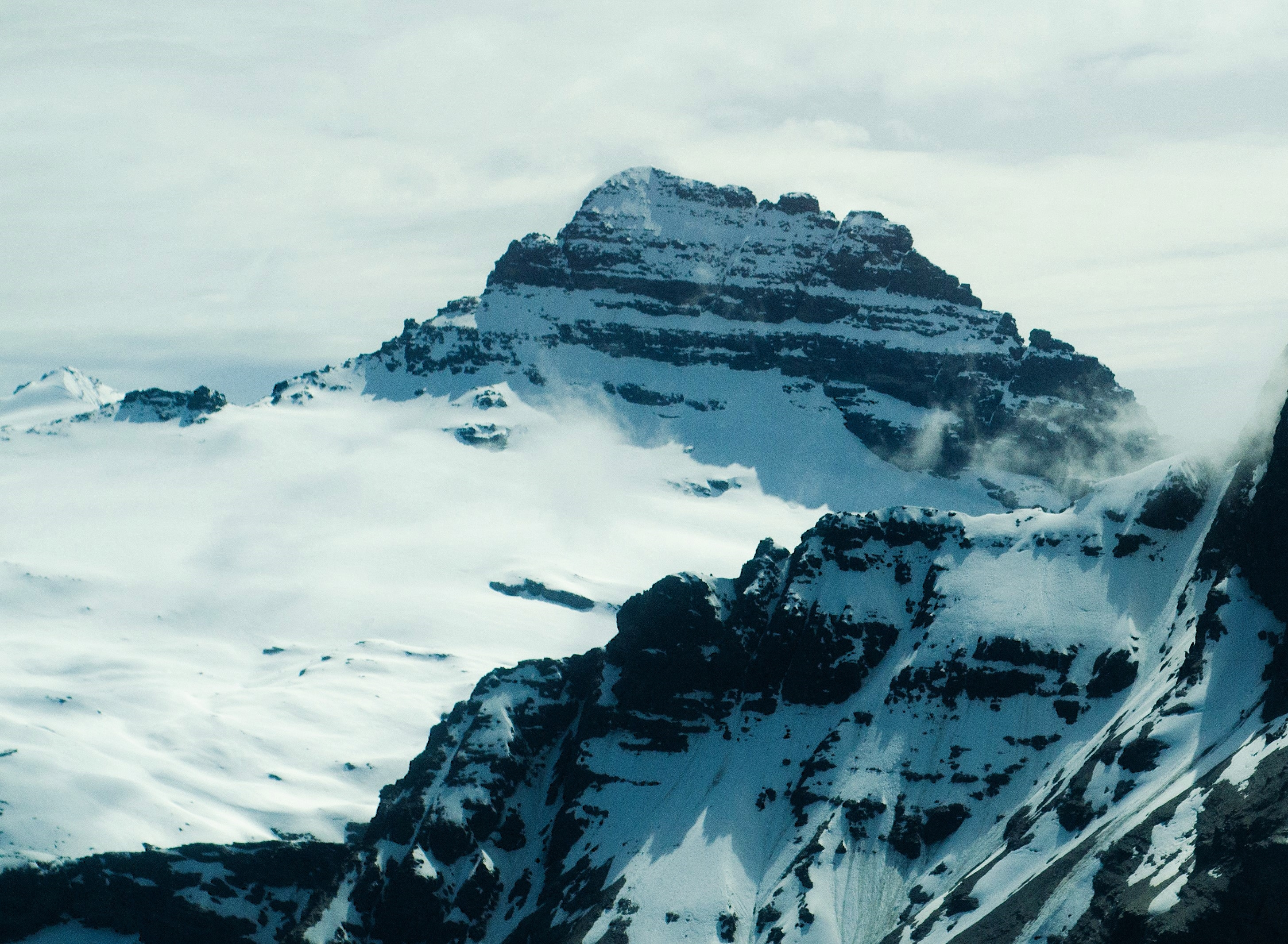
- Southwest aspect

Highest point
- Elevation: 2,610 m (8,563 ft)
- Prominence: 535 m (1,755 ft)
- Isolation: 3.11 km (1.93 mi)
- Listing: Highest mountains of New Zealand
- Coordinates: 44.592378°S 168.404531°E

Geography
- Location within New Zealand
- Interactive map of Sir William Peak
- Location: South Island
- Country: New Zealand
- Region: Otago
- Protected area: Mount Aspiring National Park
- Parent range: Southern Alps; Forbes Mountains
- Topo map(s): NZMS260 E40; Topo50 CA10

Climbing
- First ascent: December 1930
- Easiest route: North Face

Sir William Peak is a 2,610-metre-elevation (8,563-foot) mountain in Otago, New Zealand.

== Description ==
Sir William Peak is located 28 kilometres north of Glenorchy, New Zealand, in the Southern Alps of the South Island. It is set within Mount Aspiring National Park which is part of the Te Wahipounamu UNESCO World Heritage Site. The peak is part of the Forbes Mountains which are a subrange of the Southern Alps. Precipitation runoff from the mountain's southwest slope drains to the Dart River / Te Awa Whakatipu via Bedford Stream, whereas all other slopes drain to the Rees River via Hunter Creek. Topographic relief is significant as the summit rises 2,150 metres (7,054 feet) above the Dart Valley in five kilometres, and 1,300 metres (4,265 feet) above the West Branch of Hunter Creek in 1.5 kilometre. The nearest higher neighbour is Mount Earnslaw, three kilometres to the south. This mountain's toponym has been officially approved by the New Zealand Geographic Board.

== Climate ==
Based on the Köppen climate classification, Sir William Peak is located in a marine west coast climate zone, with a subpolar oceanic climate (Cfc) at the summit. Prevailing westerly winds blow moist air from the Tasman Sea onto the mountain, where the air is forced upwards by the mountains (orographic lift), causing moisture to drop in the form of rain and snow. This climate supports the Frances Glacier on the southwest slope and an unnamed glacier on the east slope of the mountain. The months of December through February offer the most favourable weather for viewing or climbing this peak.

== Climbing ==
The first ascent of the summit was made in December 1930 by J.A. Sim, V.J. Leader, and K. Grinling.

Climbing routes:

- South Ridge – G.N. Tunzelman, Bob Lidstone – (1963)
- North Face
- East Ridge

== See also ==
- List of mountains of New Zealand by height
- Sir William Fox
- Sir William Jackson Hooker
