= Turnbull River =

River in New Zealand

- Route of the Turnbull River
- Mouth of the Turnbull River Turnbull River (New Zealand)

Location
- Country: New Zealand
- Region: West Coast
- District: Westland

Physical characteristics
- Source: Confluence of Cache Stream and Turnback Torrent
  - coordinates: 44.0838°S 169.0054°E
- Mouth
  - location: Tasman Sea
  - coordinates: 43°54′15″S 168°54′14″E
- Length: 22 km (14 mi)

Basin features
- Progression: Turnbull River → Tasman Sea
- Tributaries
  - left: Stormy Rivulet, Abandon Brook, Mueller River, Precedent Creek, Question Creek, All-Up Creek, Foregone Creek, Stout Creek
  - right: Cramp Creek, Shiver Creek, Accident Creek, Io or Ossify Creek, Adieu Creek, Taken -a- Back Creek, Ease Down Creek, Dribble Creek, Gagliardi Creek, Stout Creek, Collyer Creek

The Turnbull River is a short river on the West Coast of New Zealand's South Island. It flows northwest from the Southern Alps for 22 kilometres (14 mi), entering the Tasman Sea at the northern end of Jackson Bay, 10 kilometres (6.2 mi) south of Haast. The Turnbull shares its mouth with the Okuru River.

The Haast area is not connected to the national electricity grid. New Zealand Energy operates an electricity distribution network supplying the town. Electricity is generated by an 800-kilowatt hydroelectric scheme on the Turnbull River, constructed in 1972. The scheme is backed up by a 375-kilowatt diesel generator. In 2023, the company applied for consent to build a second hydro power station on the Turnbull River.
