= Waipara River (West Coast) =

River in West Coast, New Zealand

- Route of the Waipara River
- Mouth of the Waipara River Waipara River (West Coast) (South Island)

Location
- Country: New Zealand
- region: West Coast Region
- District: Westland District

Physical characteristics
- Source: Bonar Glacier
  - coordinates: 44.3823°S 168.6504°E
  - elevation: 517 m (1,696 ft)
- Mouth: Arawhata River
  - coordinates: 44°14′34″S 168°39′13″E

Basin features
- Progression: Waipara River → Arawhata River → Jackson Bay / Okahu → Tasman Sea
- River system: Arawhata River basin
- Tributaries
  - left: The Wilson, The Bascand, The Purser, Response Torrent, Cat O'Nine Tails, The Grease Pot, Tar Pot Creek, Butland Creek, The Second Mate, The Peter Walker, Ratlin Water, Saddle Creek
  - right: The Bignell, The Steward, The Fireman, The Binnacle, The Funnel, The Stoker, The Cook, The Rudder, The Third Mate, The Larry Bell, The Cabin Boy, Engineer Creek, Sutherland Creek, Nob Creek
- Waterfalls: Cabin Pass Rapids, The Companion Ladder Rapids, Gorge Rapids

The Waipara River drain from the Bonar Glacier on Mount Aspiring / Tititea before joining the Arawhata River and flowing northwest into the Tasman Sea near Jackson Bay. Its name translates to 'muddy water', wai meaning water and para meaning mud.

== See also ==
- List of rivers of New Zealand
