= Williamson River (New Zealand) =

River in New Zealand

- Route of the Williamson River
- Mouth of the Williamson River Williamson River (New Zealand) (South Island)

Location
- Country: New Zealand
- region: West Coast Region
- District: Westland District

Physical characteristics
- Source: Lake Williamson
  - location: 655 m (2,149 ft)
  - coordinates: 44.4054°S 168.4069°E
- Mouth: Arawhata River
  - coordinates: 44°23′11″S 168°28′45″E
- Length: 7.56 kilometres (4.70 mi)

Basin features
- Progression: Williamson River → Arawhata River → Jackson Bay / Okahu → Tasman Sea
- River system: Arawhata River basin
- Tributaries
  - left: Pass Creek, Tornado Creek, Topsey Creek

The Williamson River is a minor river in the South Island of New Zealand.

It lies within the borders of the Mount Aspiring National Park and feeds into the Arawhata River.
