= Okuru River =

River in New Zealand

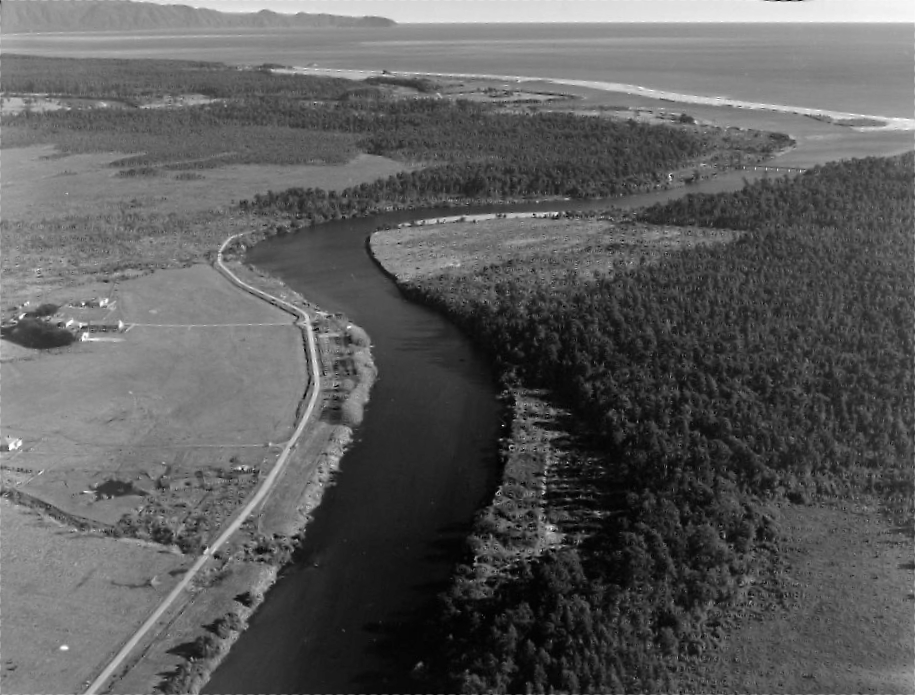
- Aerial photo, 1951
- Route of the Okuru River
- Mouth of the Okuru River Okuru River (New Zealand)

Location
- Country: New Zealand
- Region: West Coast
- District: Westland

Physical characteristics
- Source: Maori Saddle
  - coordinates: 44.1084°S 169.0018°E
- Mouth
  - location: Tasman Sea
  - coordinates: 44°03′10″S 169°08′47″E
- Length: 45 km (28 mi)

Basin features
- Progression: Okuru River → Tasman Sea
- Tributaries
  - left: Atom Creek, Shining Water, Dancing Water, Arcade Creek, Turmoil Torrent, Ngatau River, Franklin Creek, Eggeling Creek, Warren Creek, Nolans Creek
  - right: Chatter Creek, Squabble Creek, Alioth Brook, Change Creek, Bright Water, Merry Brook, Alarm Creek, Princes Creek, Chlorite Creek, Swift Water, Emily Creek, Lindsay Creek, Katie Creek, Retreat Rivulet, Middle Creek, Staircase Creek, Nerger Creek, Denis Creek, Tillys Creek

The Okuru River is located on the West Coast of the South Island of New Zealand. It flows northwest for 45 kilometres from its headwaters in the Southern Alps to the west of the Haast Pass to the Tasman Sea at the northern end of Jackson Bay, 12 kilometres south of Haast.

The river shares its mouth with the Turnbull River. The settlement of Okuru is set on the bank of the river close to its mouth.

The Open Bay Islands lie five kilometres offshore opposite the mouth.

The river has an excellent brown trout fishery, and is used by kayackers, having around 6 class III rapids.

In 2019, the Okuru had migrated 600 m north and was threatening the road between Haast and Jackson Bay, and the Westland District Council was forced for the first time to straighten the river by cutting a new mouth to the sea.
