= Joe River (New Zealand) =

- Route of the Joe River
- Mouth of the Joe River Joe River (New Zealand) (New Zealand)

Location
- Country: New Zealand
- Region: West Coast
- District: Westland

Physical characteristics
- Source: Joe Glacier
  - coordinates: 44.4775°S 168.3686°E
  - elevation: 960 metres (3,150 ft)
- Mouth
  - location: Arawhata River
  - coordinates: 44°24′50″S 168°30′14″E
  - elevation: 390 metres (1,280 ft)
- Length: 15 kilometres (9.3 mi)

Basin features
- Progression: Joe River → Arawhata River → Jackson Bay / Okahu → Tasman Sea
- Tributaries
  - right: Victor Creek, South Snowball Creek

The Joe River is a river of the South Island of New Zealand. It is located north of the Barrier Range and Snowdrift Range and drains the Joe Glacier and Twin Icefall to the Arawhata River.

== See also ==
- List of rivers of New Zealand
