= Arawhata River =

River in West Coast Region, New Zealand

Arawhata River Arawata River
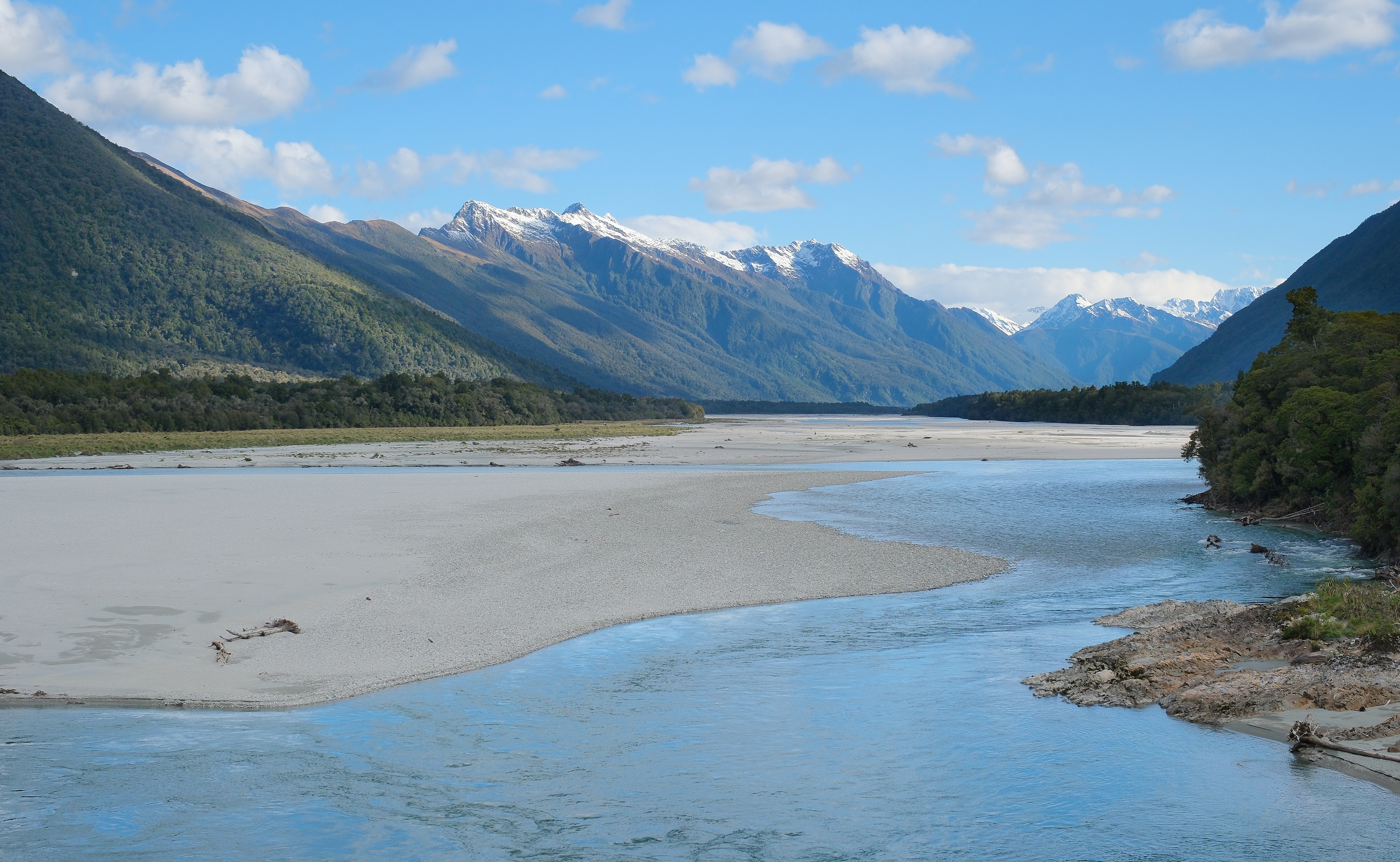
- Route of the Arawhata River
- Mouth of the Arawhata River Arawhata River (South Island)
- Native name: Arawhata (Māori)

Location
- Country: New Zealand
- region: West Coast Region
- District: Westland District

Physical characteristics
- Source: Waipara Saddle
  - location: Southern Alps / Kā Tiritiri o te Moana
  - coordinates: 44.400°S 168.649°E
  - elevation: 1,280 metres (4,200 ft)
- Mouth: Jackson Bay / Okahu
  - location: Neils Beach
  - coordinates: 44°00′S 168°41′E
  - elevation: 0 metres (0 ft)
- Length: 60 kilometres (37 mi)

Basin features
- Progression: Arawhata River → Jackson Bay / Okahu → Tasman Sea
- River system: Arawhata River basin
- Tributaries
  - left: Stokes Creek, Phantom Creek, Snowball Creek, Joe River, Williamson River, Ridge Creek, Halfway Creek, Ten Hour Gorge Creek, Collins Creek, McTavish Creek, Clarke Creek, McArthur Creek, Joe Creek, McIntosh Creek, Shady Creek, Thomson Creek, Pounding Torrent, Fraser Creek, Notch Creek, Howe Creek, Jackson River, Frolic Brook, Gipsy Creek
  - right: Mercer Stream, Fez Creek, Eros Creek, Slate Creek, Moore Creek, Snowden Creek, Pommel Creek, Waipara River, Fingals Creek, Top Creek, Nightfall Stream, Landslip Creek, Mongana Creek, Downpour Torrent, Jackass Creek, Music Creek, Fury Torrent, T.L. Creek, Tuning Fork Creek, Beau Creek, Barton Creek
- Bridges: Haast-Jackson Bay Road

The Arawhata River (often spelt with the Ngāi Tahu Māori dialect spelling Arawata River) is in the West Coast region of the South Island of New Zealand.

The river has its headwaters in the Mount Aspiring National Park. It drains the western side of the Southern Alps / Kā Tiritiri o te Moana and heads in a northerly direction for 60 kilometres (37 mi), flowing into Jackson Bay / Okahu. A small lake, Lake Ellery, drains into the river near its mouth, via a short tributary, the Jackson River.

Access is possible up the river by jetboat. Access to the glaciers, forests and flats of the upper reaches of the valley is restricted by Ten Hour Gorge. Glacial silt in the river imparts an opaque green to greyish coloration to the water. The lower valley is grazed by cattle by the local farmers under a grazing licence. The majority of the land in the area is publicly owned and administered by the Department of Conservation.

Owing to the high rainfall on the western side of the Southern Alps, the river level can rapidly rise.
