= Mount Aspiring / Tititea =

Mountain in New Zealand

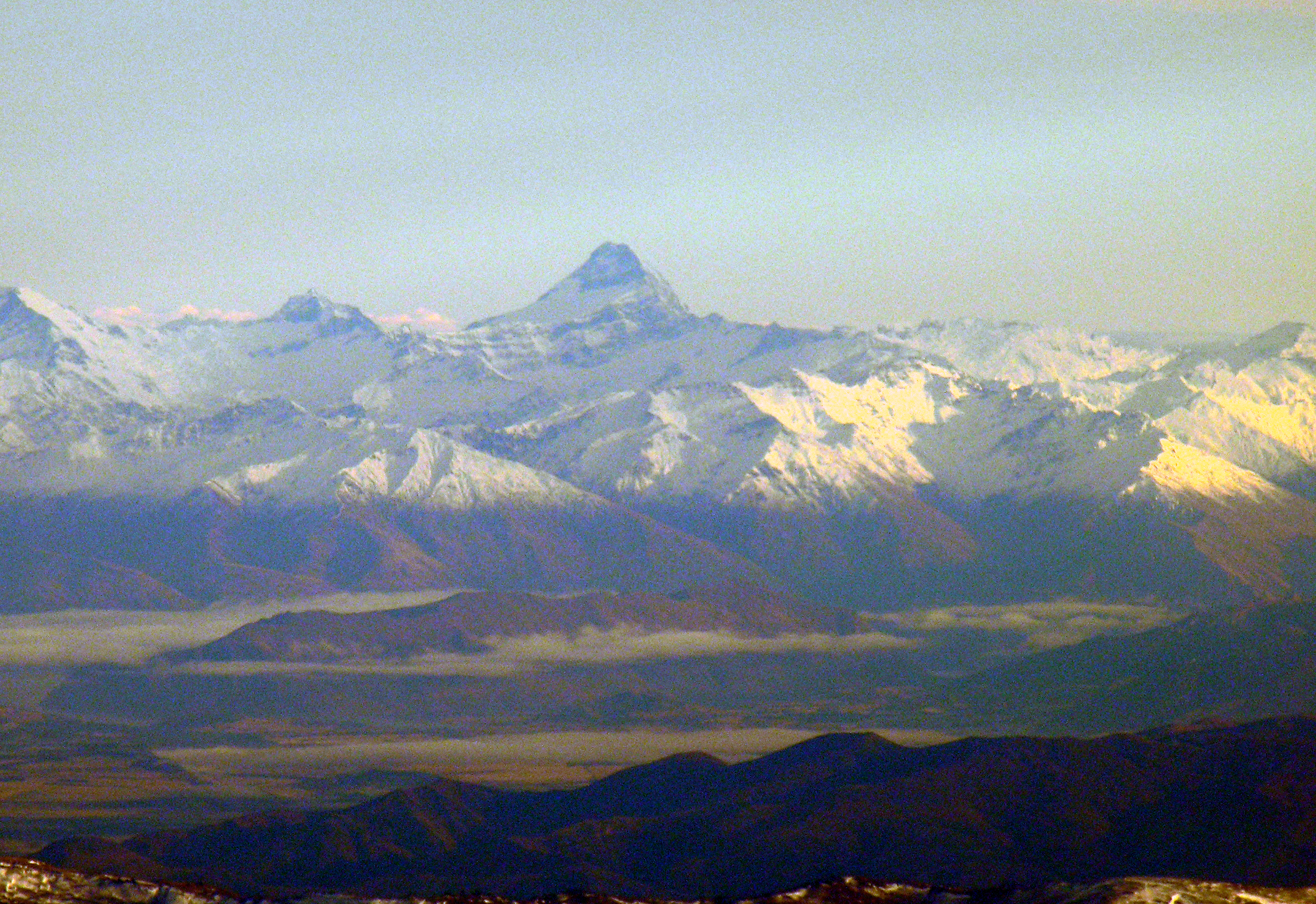

Highest point
- Elevation: 3,033 m (9,951 ft)
- Prominence: 2,475 m (8,120 ft)
- Parent peak: Aoraki / Mount Cook
- Isolation: 130.8 km (81.3 mi) to Mount Sefton
- Listing: Ultra; 9th highest in New Zealand
- Coordinates: 44°23.0526′S 168°43.6752′E

Naming
- Native name: Tititea (Māori)
- English translation: clear or shining peak

Geography
- Location within New Zealand
- Country: New Zealand
- Region: West Coast
- District: Westland
- Protected area: Mount Aspiring National Park
- Parent range: Southern Alps

Climbing
- First ascent: 1909

Mount Aspiring / Tititea is New Zealand's 23rd-highest mountain. The peak's altitude of 3,033 metres (9,951 ft) makes it the country's highest outside the Aoraki / Mount Cook National Park region.

== Names ==
Māori named it Tititea, after a chief of the Waitaha iwi, who were the first people to settle the South Island.

It was named Aspiring in December 1857 by the Chief Surveyor for the Otago Province, John Turnbull Thomson.

It is also often called "the Matterhorn of the South", for its pyramidal peak when seen from the Matukituki River.

The mountain's name was used for the surrounding Mount Aspiring National Park at its creation in 1964.

The mountain's official name was updated to Mount Aspiring / Tititea in 1998, by the Treaty Settlement Legislation Section 269 and Schedule 96 of the Ngāi Tahu Claims Settlement Act 1998.

== Location ==
Mount Aspiring / Tititea sits slightly to the west of the main divide, 30 kilometres west of Lake Wānaka. It lies at the junction of three major glacial systems – the Bonar Glacier, which drains into the Waipara River, and the Volta and Therma glaciers, which both drain into the Waiatoto River. The Waipara is a tributary of the Arawhata River, and both the Arawhata and Waitoto Rivers flow out to the West Coast in between Haast and Jackson Bay.

== Climbing ==
The first ascent was on 23 November 1909 by Major Bernard Head and guides Jack Clarke and Alec Graham. Head's party climbed to the summit ridge by the west face from the Bonar Glacier, a route not repeated until 1965.

The most used route to Mount Aspiring is up the West Matukituki Valley, which is at the end of a 50-kilometre road from Wānaka at Raspberry Flat. From here a network of huts provide staging points for climbers.

The first is Mount Aspiring Hut, which is 8 kilometres (or approximately two hours' walk) from the end of the road. The next hut is an 8-12hr hike away that is mainly off trail. The trail only provides a route for the first half of the approach that winds through the flat valley floor. From the end of the trail one can either ascend the French Ridge and traverse the Bonar Glacier, or ascend Bevan Col to the Bonar Glacier. Both require good route finding skills and knowledge of rock climbing techniques and glacial travel. Many climbers opt to fly in via helicopter because of the gruelling approach.

The mountain and park are popular with climbers and trampers, so has experienced a number of accidents and deaths.

== See also ==
- List of mountains of New Zealand by height
