= Jackson Bay =

Bay in West Coast, New Zealand

Jackson Bay / Okahu
- Ōkahu (Māori)
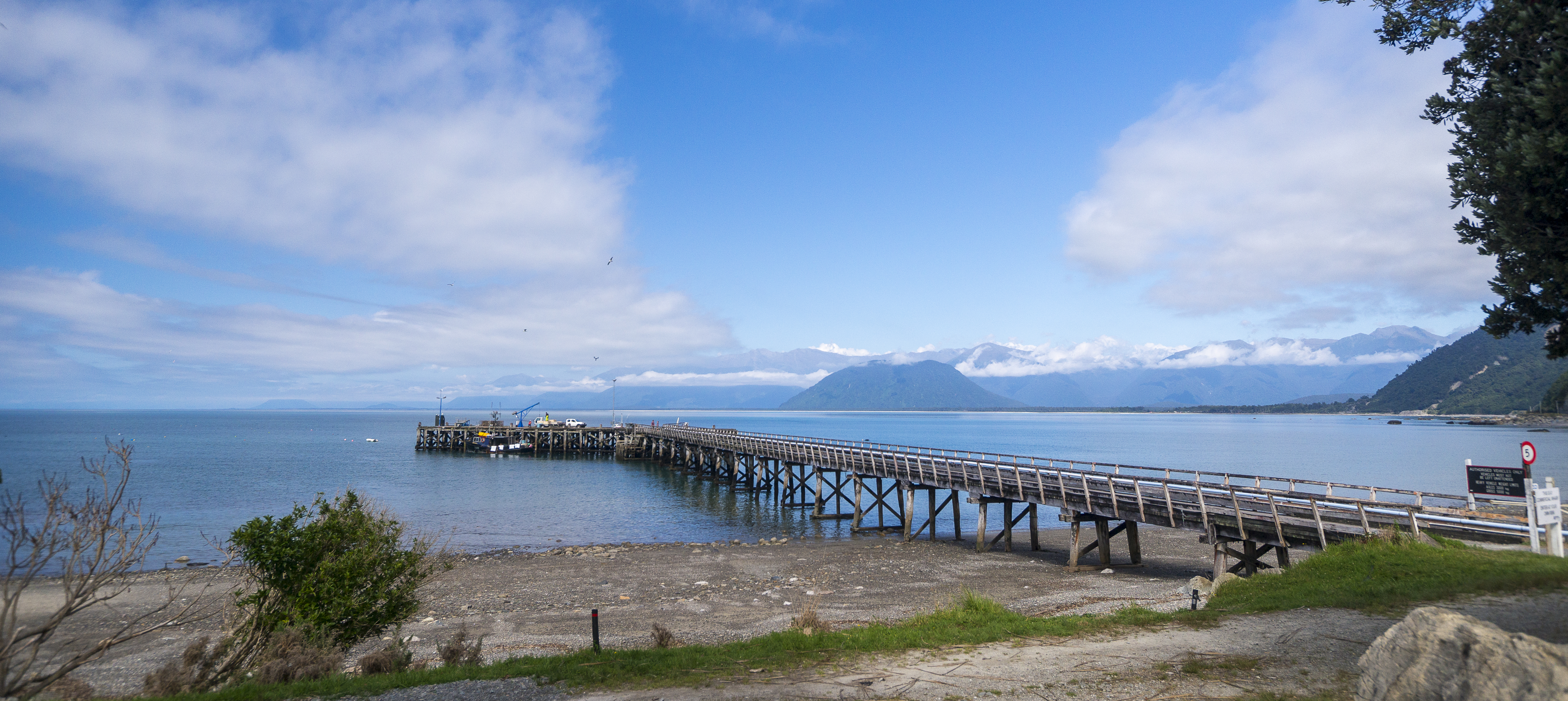
- Jackson Bay / Okahu

- Location within New Zealand
- Location: Westland District, West Coast Region
- Coordinates: 43°58′S 168°37′E
- Part of: Tasman Sea
- River sources: Arawhata River, Okuru River, Turnbull River, Waiatoto River
- Basin countries: New Zealand
- Islands: Open Bay Islands

Jackson Bay / Okahu (Māori: Ōkahu) is a gently curving 24-kilometre (15 mi) bay on the southern West Coast of the South Island of New Zealand. It faces the Tasman Sea to the north, and is backed by the Southern Alps. It contains the settlements of Hannahs Clearing, Waiatoto, Neils Beach, and the fishing village of Jackson Bay at its western end. The bay is the southernmost terminus of the West Coast's roads.

== Toponymy ==
Jackson Bay was named Open Bay by Captain Cook; the origins of its current name are obscure. Possible namesake sources include: Port Jackson, New South Wales; James Hayter Jackson, a local whaler; or William Jackson, a sealer said to have been part of a party that was marooned in the area in 1810. In the early years of settlement, the bay was known as Jackson's Bay, later losing its possessive. Following the passage of the Ngāi Tahu Claims Settlement Act 1998, the name of the bay was officially altered to Jackson Bay / Okahu.

== History ==
Jackson Bay and the mouth of the Arawhata River was home to a Māori settlement for hundreds of years. Māori harvested fish and seals, and gathered the valuable pounamu (greenstone) that originated in the Red Hills inland. When the explorer John Boultbee visited the bay in 1826, the settlement's population was about 300, but it had declined by the time Europeans began to settle the area, and was abandoned in 1866.

In 1842, the whaler Thomas Chaseland set up a shore whaling station at Jackson Bay, a spot he knew from his days as a sealer, to target migrating whales such as southern right and humpbacks. On the foreshore of Jackson Bay is a grave and marker for Claude Ollivier of the schooner Ada, who died in Jackson Bay on 27 August 1862.

Jackson Bay was chosen in 1874 as the site of a government-supported settlement under the assisted immigrant programme. A plan for a seaport named Arawata was drawn up by Westland chief surveyor Gerhard Mueller. The plans included a network of streets crossing the peninsula and hugging the cliffs, and a waterfront esplanade. The vision for the settlement was a thriving port that would support fishing, forestry, mining, and the farming and settlement of the nearby river flats. The immigrants (Poles, Irish, Italians, Scandinavians, Germans, and English) arrived in 1875, and immediately ran into difficulties. Flat land was hard to come by and was infertile and frequently flooded; the rainfall, sandflies, and isolation took their toll; and there was no wharf or road. Within three years, most of the settlers had departed.

A wharf was finally built in Jackson Bay in 1938, so road-building machinery could be landed for the construction of the Haast highway. A road was built from Jackson Bay to Haast, and then upriver over the Haast Pass. The wharf allowed a timber and fishing industry to start, but milling proved uneconomic as there were still plenty of forest being felled closer to the main timber markets.

After Cyclone Fehi in 2018 the Westland District Council added a rock wall to the esplanade, and the wharf was upgraded in 2021 as part of a $150 million of West Coast targeted funding from the Provincial Growth Fund.

== Geography ==
=== Setting ===
This bay is the only sheltered harbour between Greymouth, 270 km (170 mi) north, and Milford Sound, 100 km (62 mi) south (although "sheltered" is a relative term, as it is fully exposed to northerly storms). The waters off the coast are particularly productive, marking the convergence of the cool West Wind Drift and the warm Westland Current.

The westernmost point of Jackson Bay is marked by the headland Jackson Head; in the northeast the end of the bay is less well defined, but corresponds roughly with the mouths of the Turnbull and Okuru Rivers. The small Open Bay Islands Taumaka and Popotai lie 5 km (3.1 mi) off the coast at this point.

The bay marks a major change in the terrain of the west coast. To the north, narrow fertile plains lie between the mountains and the sea, allowing for dairy and deer farming. To the south, the coastal plains disappear as the land becomes steeper and more mountainous. Within 60 km (37 mi), the first of the deep glacial valleys that further south become the fiords of Fiordland start to become evident, with Lake McKerrow at the foot of the Hollyford Track.

From the junction with State Highway 6 at Haast, 32 km (20 mi) to the northeast, a small road travels southwest, crosses the Okura and Waiatoto Rivers, turns northwest after crossing the Arawhata River|Arawhata (or Arawata) River, and terminates at the settlement of Jackson Bay.

=== Climate ===
Climate data for Jackson Bay (1951–1980)
Month	Jan	Feb	Mar	Apr	May	Jun	Jul	Aug	Sep	Oct	Nov	Dec	Year
Mean daily maximum °C (°F)	18.8 (65.8)	19.2 (66.6)	18.4 (65.1)	16.1 (61.0)	13.7 (56.7)	11.3 (52.3)	11.2 (52.2)	12.2 (54.0)	13.3 (55.9)	14.2 (57.6)	15.2 (59.4)	17.8 (64.0)	15.1 (59.2)
Daily mean °C (°F)	15.0 (59.0)	15.3 (59.5)	14.6 (58.3)	12.7 (54.9)	10.3 (50.5)	7.8 (46.0)	7.6 (45.7)	8.6 (47.5)	9.8 (49.6)	10.9 (51.6)	11.8 (53.2)	14.0 (57.2)	11.5 (52.8)
Mean daily minimum °C (°F)	11.1 (52.0)	11.4 (52.5)	10.8 (51.4)	9.2 (48.6)	6.8 (44.2)	4.3 (39.7)	4.0 (39.2)	4.9 (40.8)	6.2 (43.2)	7.6 (45.7)	8.4 (47.1)	10.1 (50.2)	7.9 (46.2)
Average rainfall mm (inches)	384 (15.1)	411 (16.2)	491 (19.3)	323 (12.7)	374 (14.7)	278 (10.9)	289 (11.4)	329 (13.0)	394 (15.5)	355 (14.0)	469 (18.5)	377 (14.8)	4,474 (176.1)
Source: NIWA

== Economy ==
The settlement of Jackson Bay is New Zealand's closest harbour to Australia, and supports a fishing industry of small boats catching mostly tuna and spiny lobster (known in New Zealand as crayfish or koura), although not many of the fishers live in the bay. The settlement contains about 30 dwellings, but few permanent residents, and in the summer so many recreational fishers come with their boats from Central Otago or Queenstown for a weekend's fishing that local iwi Te Rūnanga o Makaawhio have discussed setting up mataitai reserves (marine reserves).

Located on the foreshore is The Craypot, a fish-and-chip stand and one of the main tourist attractions of the settlement. Originally constructed in Timaru as a pie cart, it was moved to Cromwell to support the construction of the Clyde Dam in the 1980s. The Cromwell pie cart was sold c. 2001 to a Haast local, who towed it over the Haast Pass behind a tractor and set it up on the Jackson Bay waterfront.

== Important bird area ==
The stretch of coastline from Jackson Head for about 10 km (6.2 mi) westwards to the mouth of the Stafford River has been identified as an Important Bird Area because it supports a breeding population of Fiordland penguins.

== Gallery ==
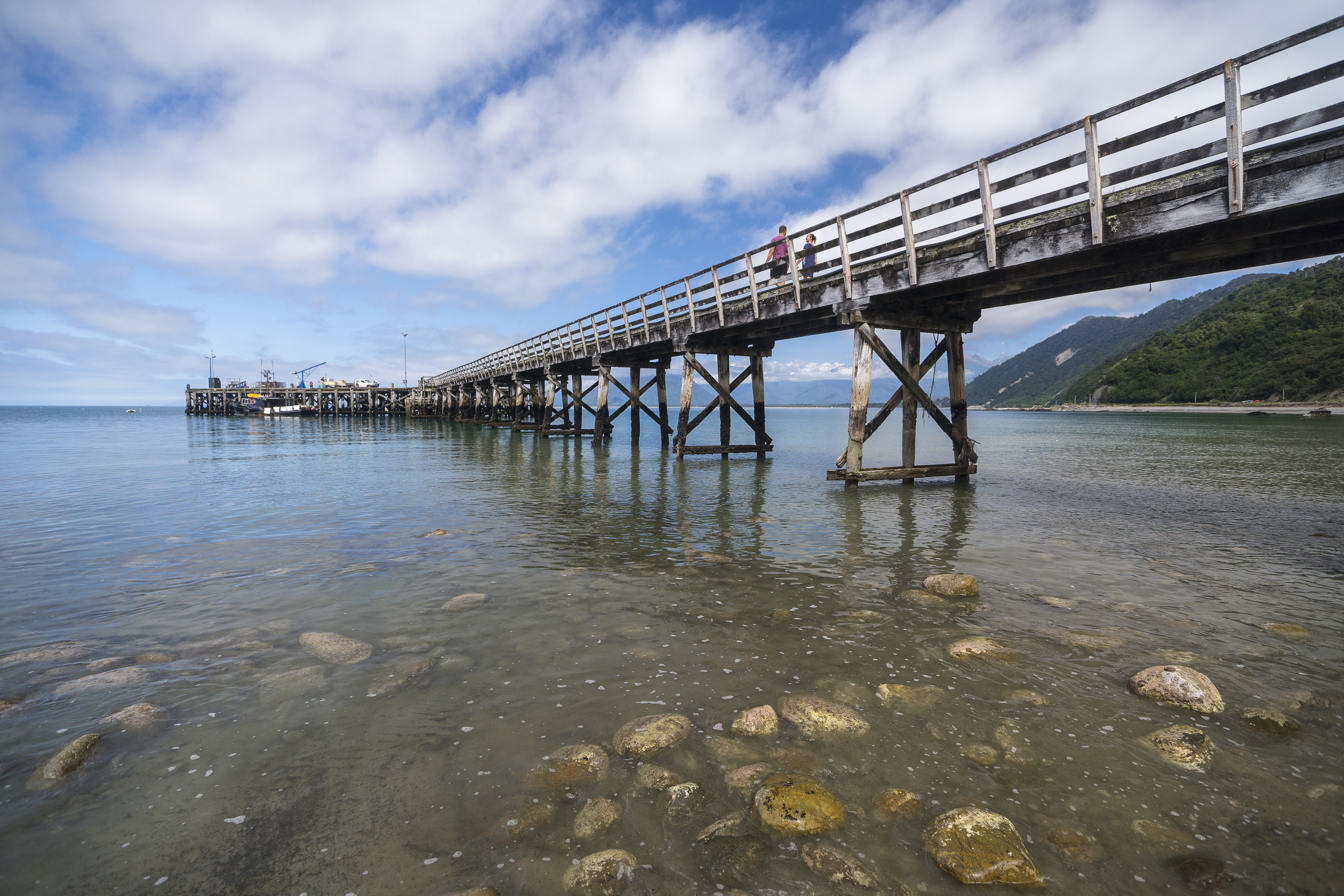

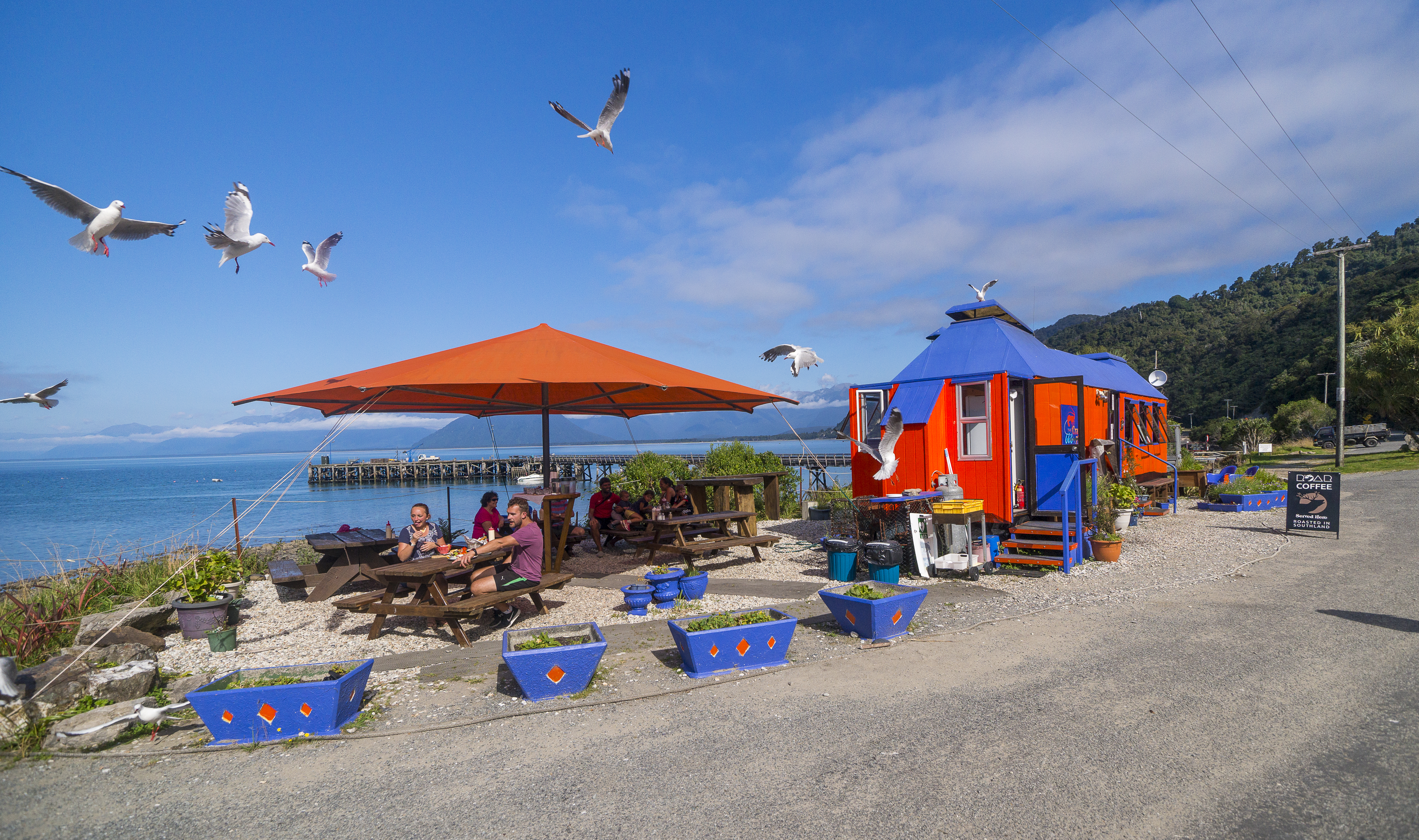

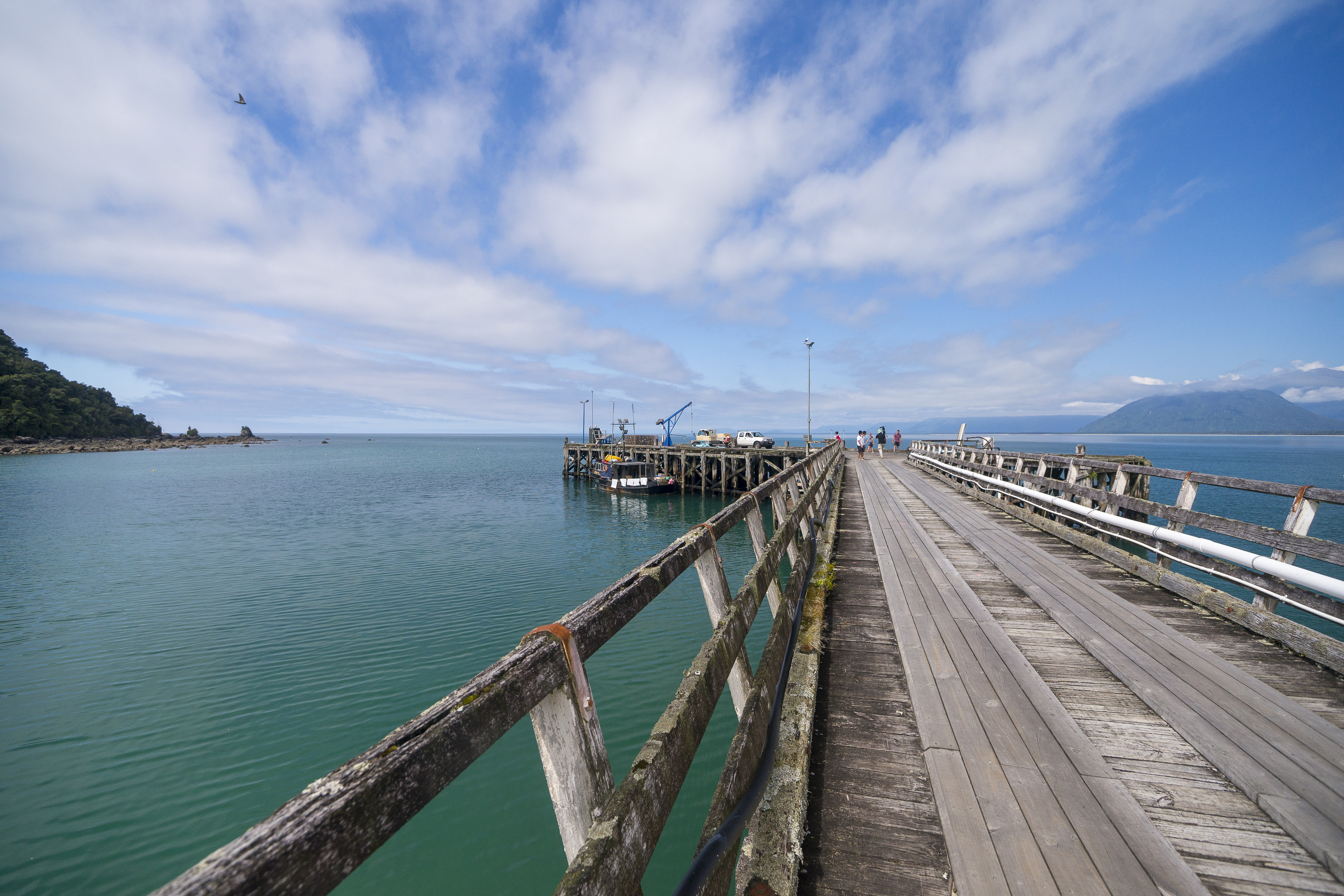

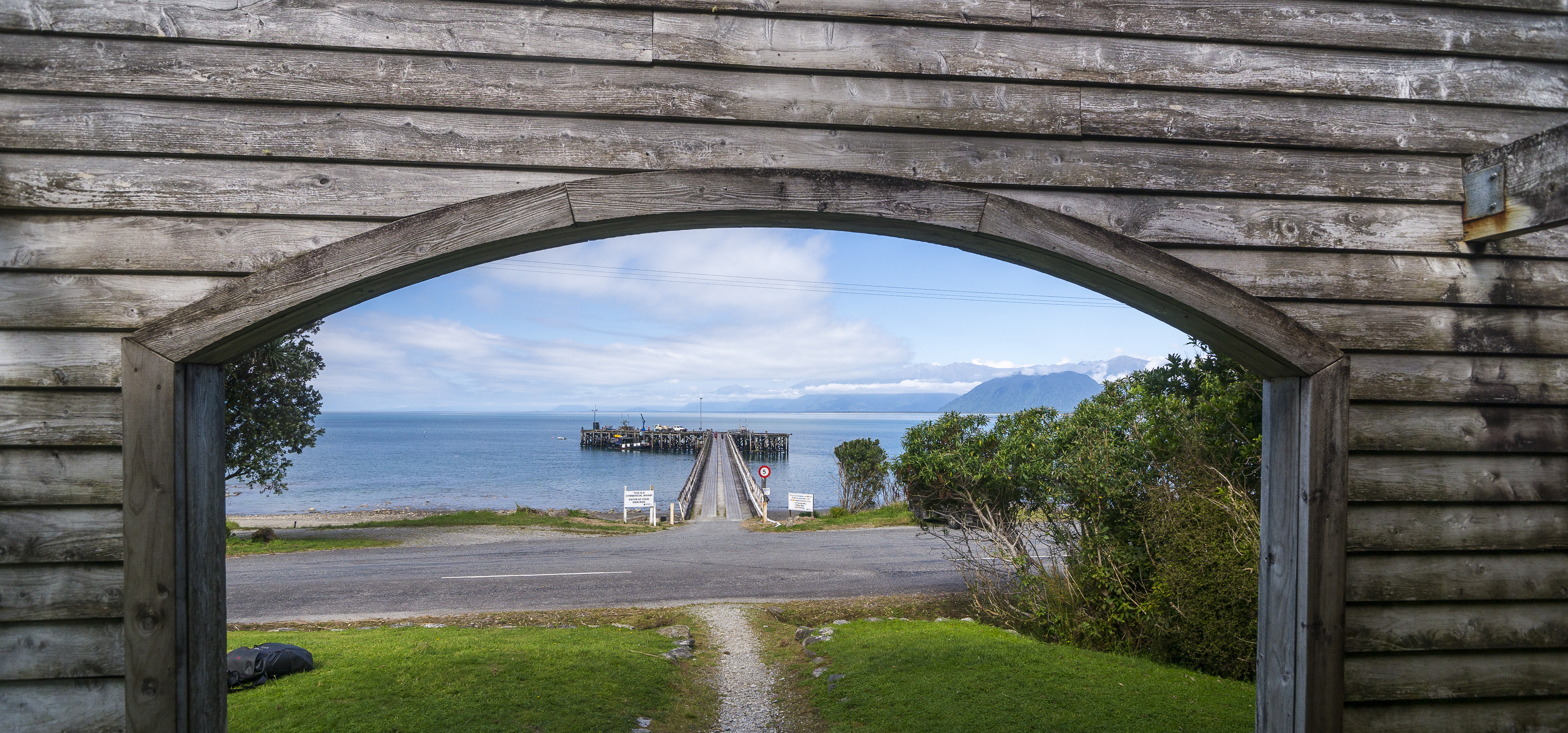
