= Mount Avalanche =

Mountain in New Zealand

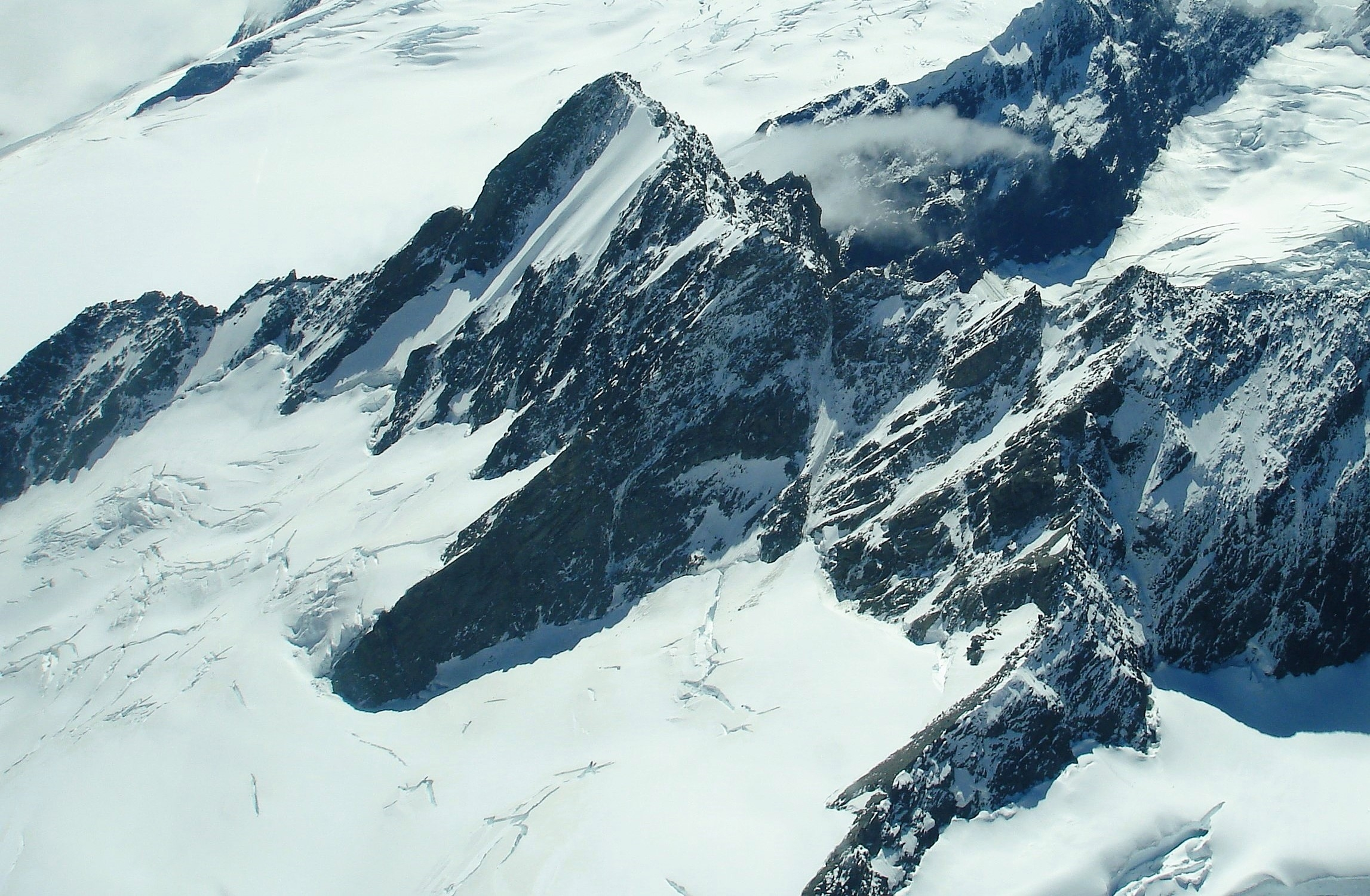
- South aspect

Highest point
- Elevation: 2,606 m (8,550 ft)
- Prominence: 366 m (1,201 ft)
- Isolation: 2.75 km (1.71 mi)
- Listing: Highest mountains of New Zealand
- Coordinates: 44.422226°S 168.74122°E

Naming
- Etymology: Avalanche

Geography
- Location within New Zealand
- Interactive map of Mount Avalanche
- Location: South Island
- Country: New Zealand
- Region: West Coast / Otago
- Protected area: Mount Aspiring National Park
- Parent range: Southern Alps
- Topo map(s): NZMS260 F39; Topo50 CA11

Climbing
- First ascent: January 1935

Mount Avalanche is a 2,606-metre-elevation (8,550-foot) mountain in New Zealand.

== Description ==
Mount Avalanche is located four kilometres south of Mount Aspiring / Tititea in the Southern Alps. The summit is set on the boundary shared by the Otago and West Coast Regions of the South Island. It is also within Mount Aspiring National Park which is part of the Te Wahipounamu UNESCO World Heritage Site. Precipitation runoff from the mountain's slopes drains to the Matukituki River. Topographic relief is significant as the summit rises 2,000 metres (6,562 feet) above the Kitchener River in three kilometres. The nearest higher neighbour is Rob Roy Peak, 3.6 kilometres to the south.

== Climate ==
Based on the Köppen climate classification, Mount Avalanche is located in a marine west coast climate zone, with a subpolar oceanic climate (Cfc) at the summit. Prevailing westerly winds blow moist air from the Tasman Sea onto the mountain, where the air is forced upwards by the mountains (orographic lift), causing moisture to drop in the form of rain and snow. This climate supports the Bonar, Hood, Avalanche, and Maud Francis glaciers on the mountain's slopes. The months of December through February offer the most favourable weather for viewing or climbing this peak.

== Climbing ==
Climbing routes with first ascents:

- West Ridge – Dennis Leigh, Bill Walker, Jock Sim – (1935)
- North Ridge – Neil Hamilton, Pearl Wright, Ron Knightley – (1949)
- South Ridge – Tony Bowden, Graham Bishop – (1963)
- West to East Peak Traverse – Laurie Kennedy, Dave Innes – (1969)
- Maud Francis Glacier

== See also ==
- List of mountains of New Zealand by height

== Gallery ==
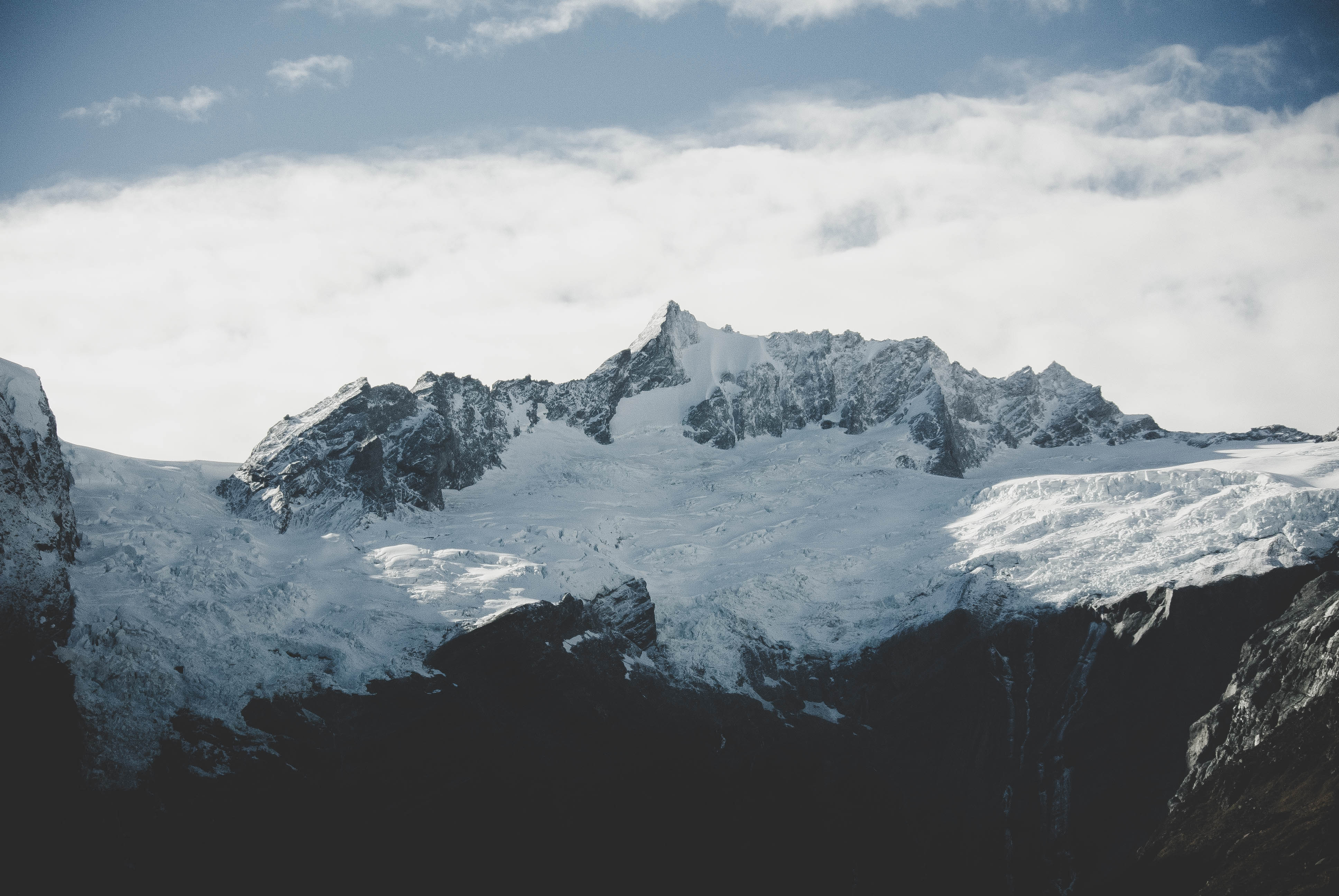
Southwest aspect with Maud Francis Glacier

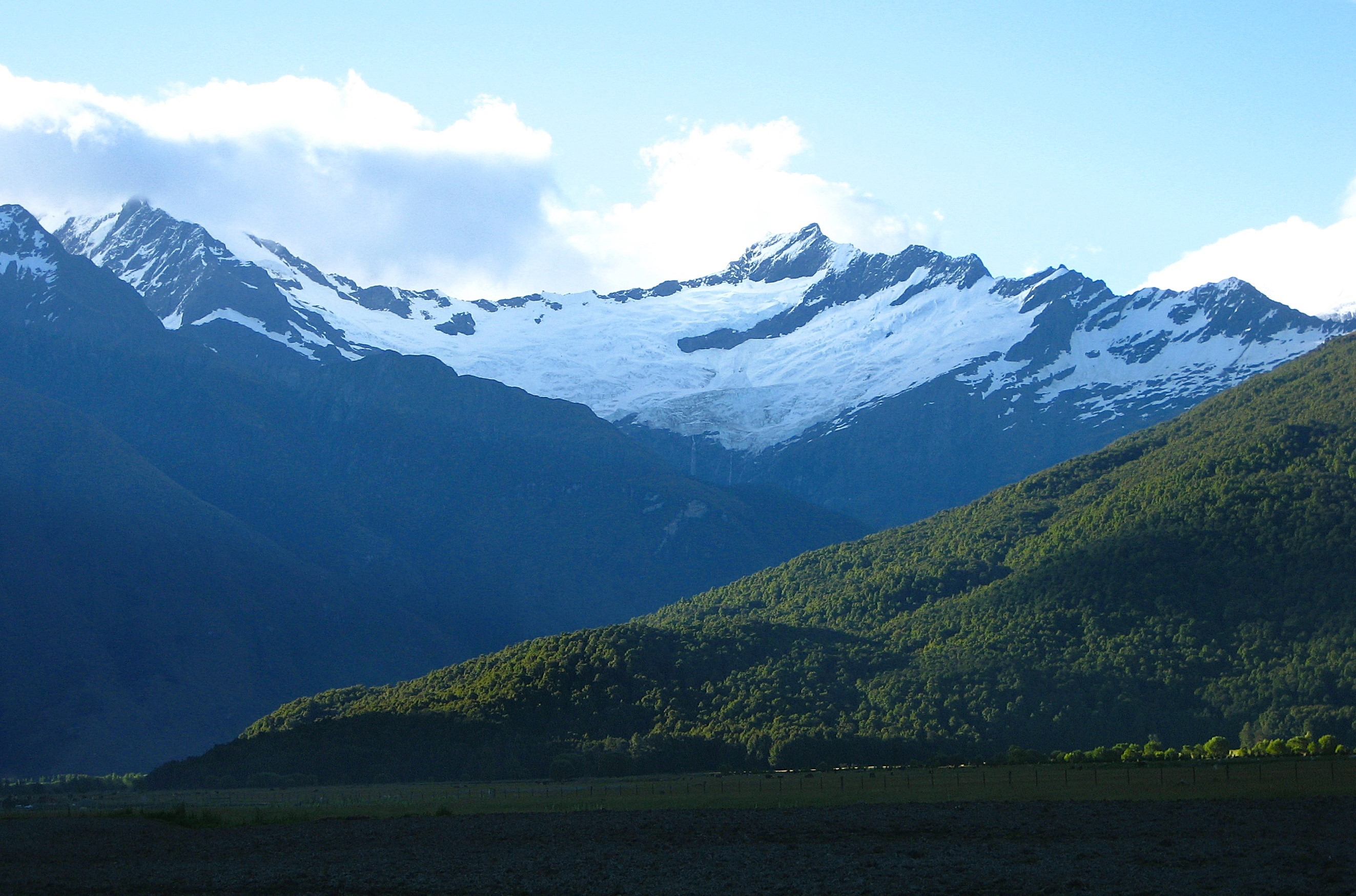
Southeast aspect with Avalanche Glacier. Rob Roy Peak to left.

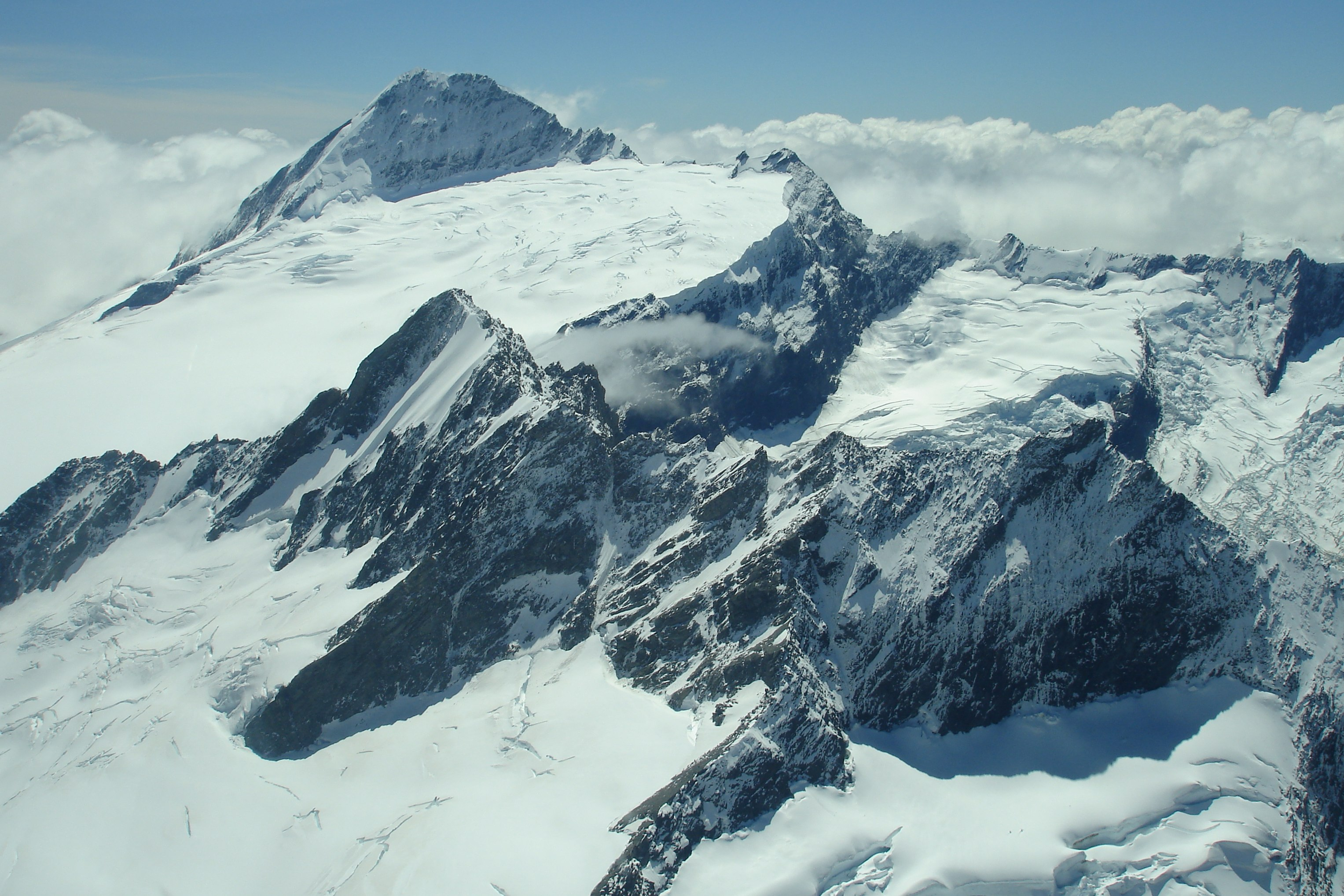
Mount Avalanche in front of Mount Aspiring
