= List of glaciers in New Zealand =

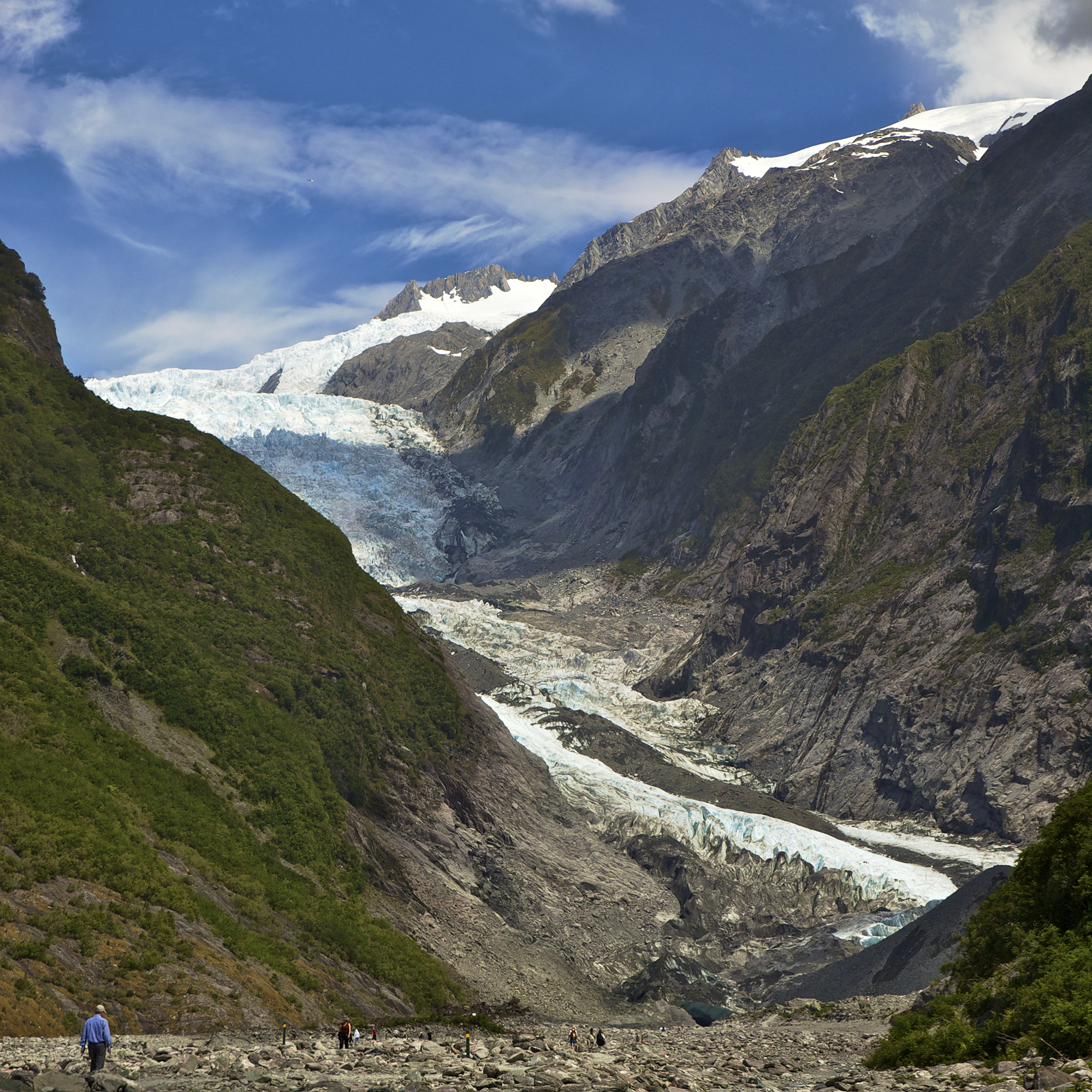
Franz Josef Glacier, as seen in 2011

New Zealand contains approximately 2900 glaciers over 1 hectare (2.5 acres) in size, almost all of them along the Southern Alps, the main divide of the South Island. This is down from around 3100 glaciers recorded in the late 1970s, due to ongoing changes to the Earth's climate. Roughly one-sixth of New Zealand's glaciers are over 10 hectares (25 acres) in size, with the largest – Tasman Glacier – with an area of 101 square kilometres (39 sq mi). Eight of New Zealand's glaciers are found on Mount Ruapehu, and represent the only glaciers within mainland New Zealand outside of the South Island.

The below is a list of named glaciers in mainland New Zealand as recorded by the New Zealand Geographic Board, who are responsible for the naming of geographic places and features in New Zealand. It does not include the several glaciers located within the Ross Dependency, a region of Antarctica claimed by New Zealand.

== North Island ==
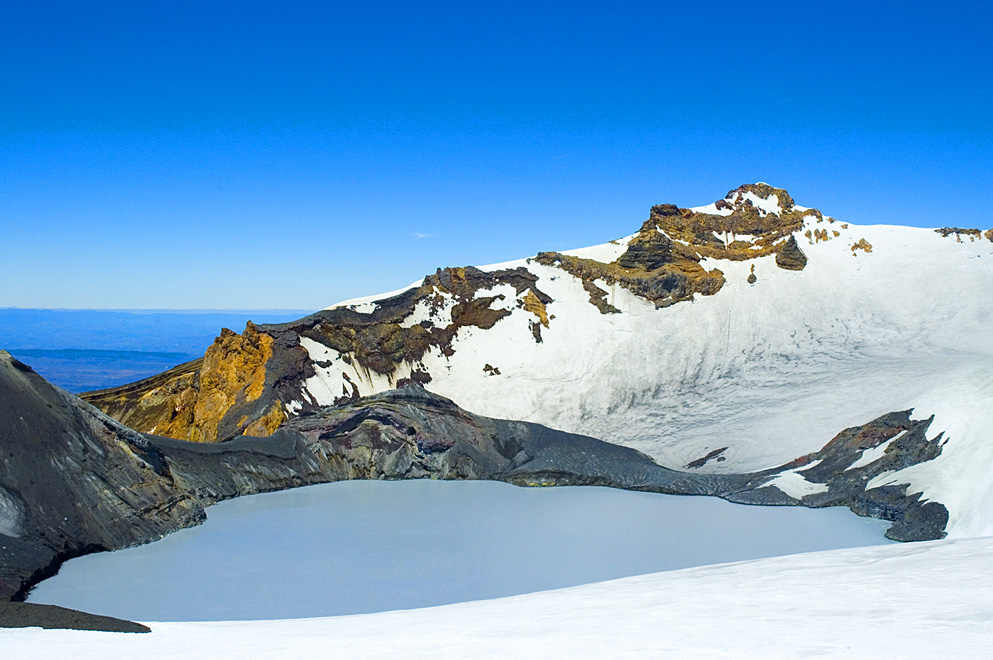
Crater Lake with one of the glaciers of Mount Ruapehu

Name	Location	Coordinates	Notes
Mangaehuehu Glacier	Mount Ruapehu	39.295207°S 175.563027°E	
Mangatoetoenui Glacier	Mount Ruapehu	39.269828°S 175.582656°E	Formerly known as the Waikato Glacier
Mangaturuturu Glacier	Mount Ruapehu	39.280056°S 175.552944°E	
Summit Plateau	Mount Ruapehu	39.271722°S 175.564972°E	
Tuwharetoa Glacier	Mount Ruapehu	39.277166°S 175.560438°E	Named after the Tūwharetoa Māori Trust
Wahianoa Glacier	Mount Ruapehu	39.290722°S 175.566944°E	
Whakapapa Glacier	Mount Ruapehu	39.270594°S 175.558577°E	Formerly known as the Whakapapaiti Glacier, to distinguish from the Whakapapanui Glacier which disappeared in the 1970s.
Whangaehu Glacier	Mount Ruapehu	39.277667°S 175.574222°E	

== South Island ==
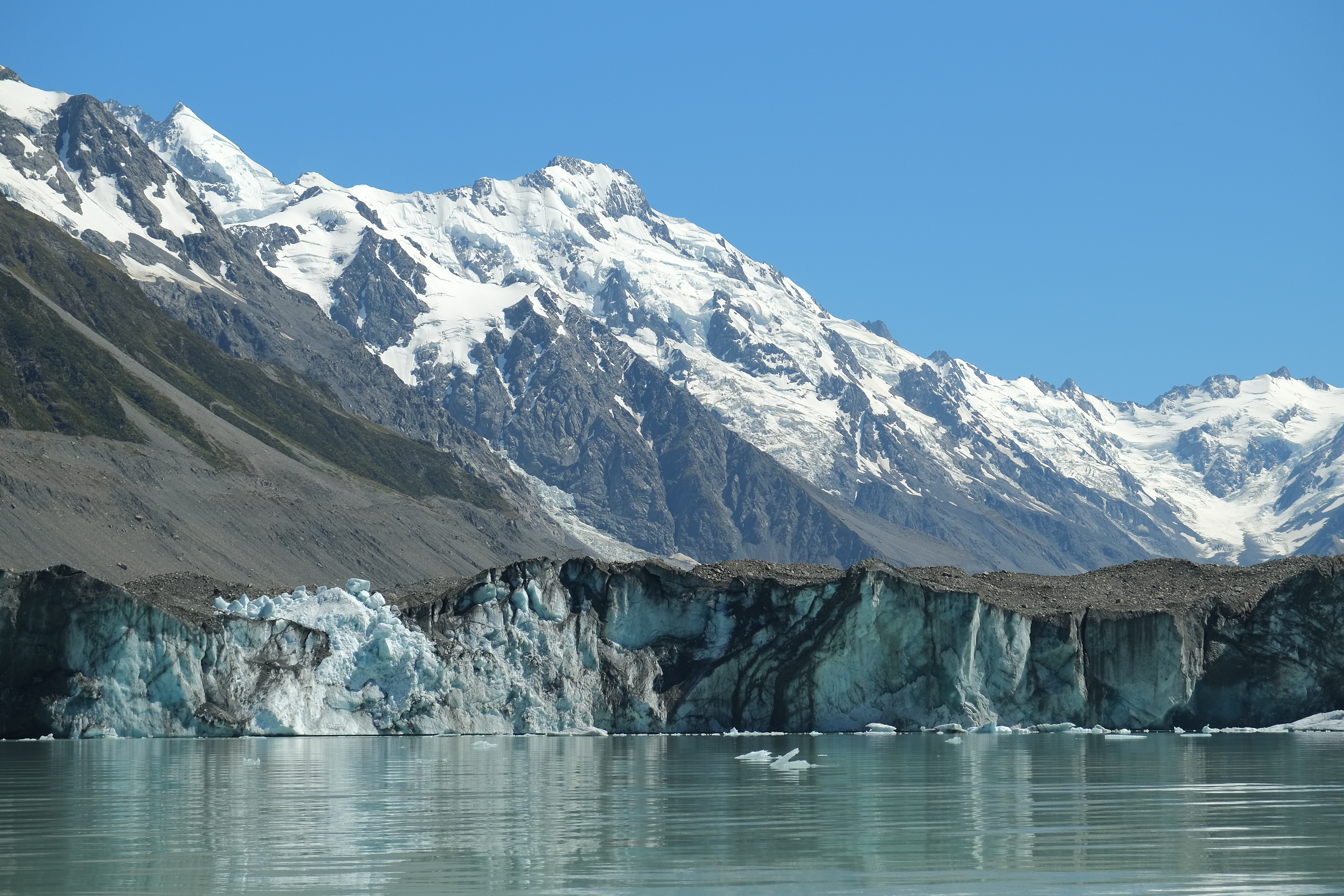
Terminus of Tasman Glacier

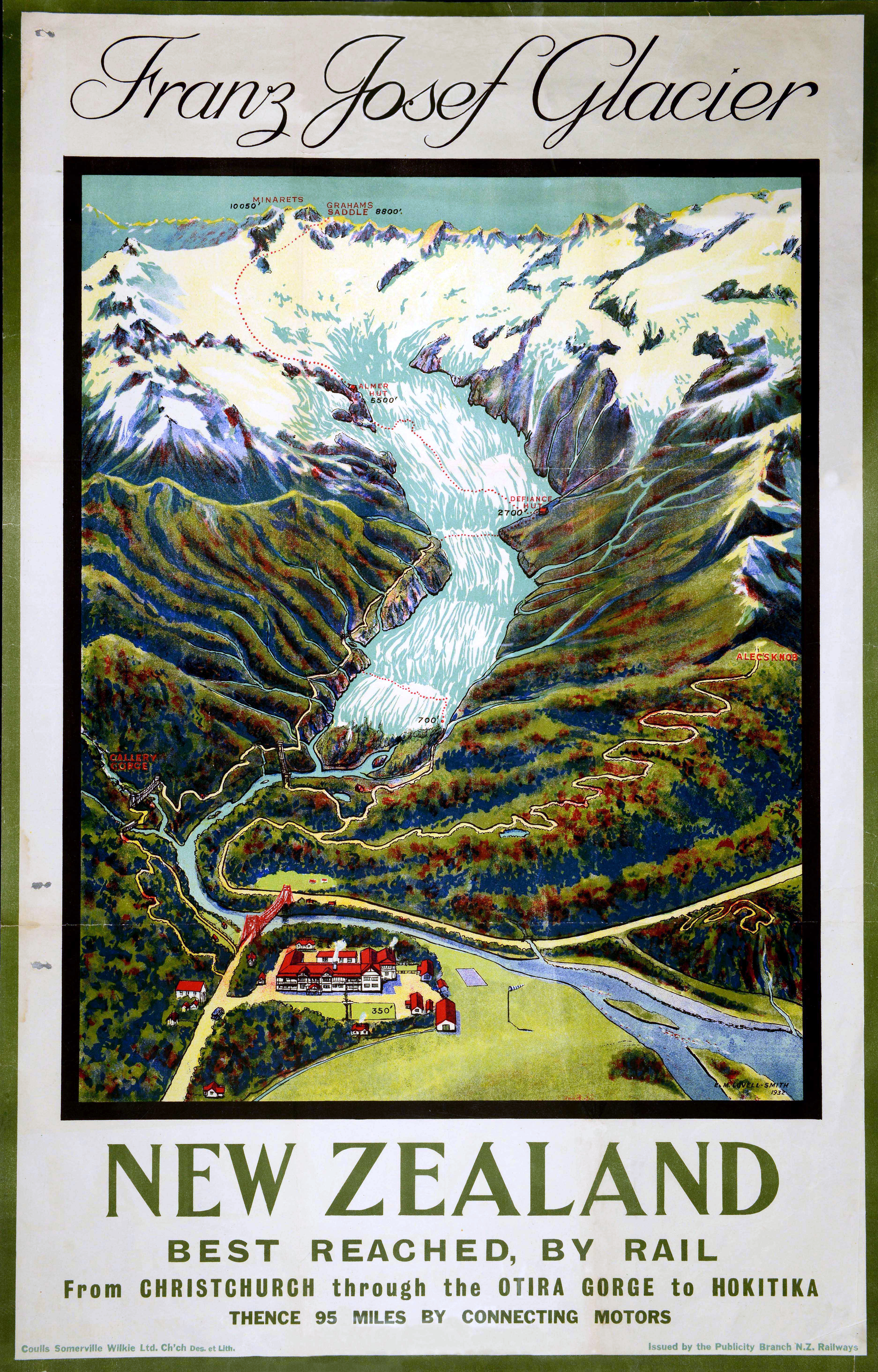
1932 New Zealand Railways tourism poster advertising Franz Josef Glacier

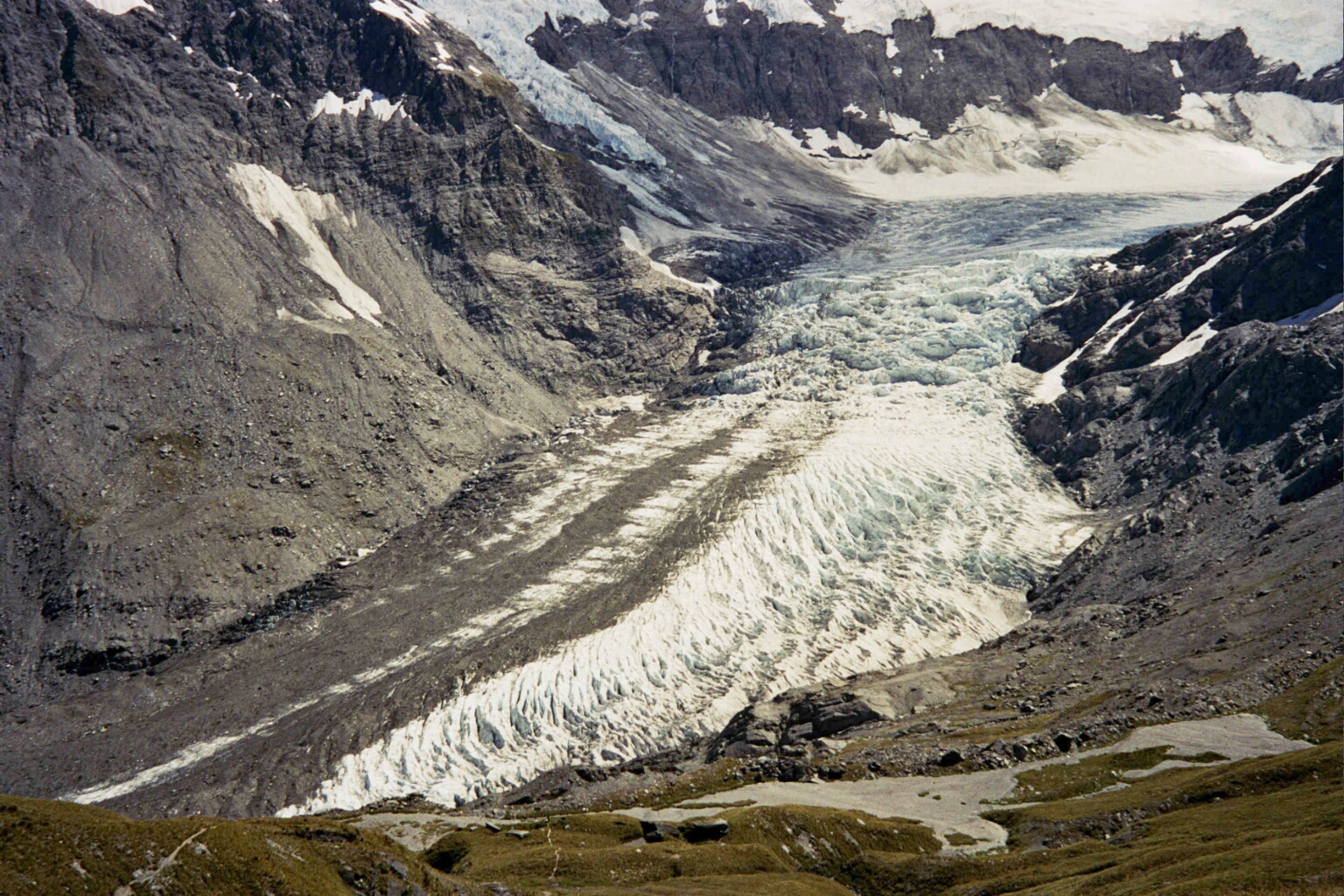
Dart Glacier, as viewed from Cascade Saddle

Name	Location	Coordinates	Notes
Abel Glacier	Westland	43.329576°S 170.6381°E	Flows from the Garden of Eden Ice Plateau, part of a series of biblically-derived names in the area.
Abel Janszoon Glacier	Westland	43.554196°S 170.152539°E	Named after explorer Abel Tasman
Abruzzi Glacier	Otago	44.504094°S 168.39209°E	
Adams Glacier	Westland	43.305196°S 170.685015°E	Flows from the Garden of Eden Ice Plateau, part of a series of biblically-derived names in the area.
Adverse Glacier	Westland	43.33449°S 170.583692°E	
Agassiz Glacier	Westland	43.504417°S 170.210278°E	
Age Glacier	Southland	44.611417°S 168.018389°E	
Agnes Glacier	Canterbury	43.357°S 170.711111°E	
Aida Glacier	Canterbury	43.519472°S 170.427028°E	
Albert Glacier	Westland	43.539639°S 170.167889°E	Tributary of Fox Glacier
Alick Glacier	Westland	44.344607°S 168.770176°E	
Almer Glacier	Westland	43.466722°S 170.208111°E	
Amherst Glacier	Canterbury	43.430683°S 170.574808°E	Named after Amherst College
Andermatten Glacier	Westland	43.470639°S 170.167694°E	
Andy Glacier	Otago	44.408472°S 168.3815°E	
Anna Glacier	Westland, Canterbury	43.488889°S 170.327611°E	Named after Anna von Lendenfeld, wife of Dr Robert von Lendenfeld
Arawhata Glacier	Otago	44.405766°S 168.655071°E	Source of the Arawhata River
Arcade Glacier	Westland	44.286984°S 168.455503°E	
Armoury Glacier	Canterbury	43.340764°S 170.850911°E	
Arthur Glacier	Westland	43.79425°S 169.909472°E	
Ashburton Glacier	Canterbury	43.371528°S 170.975028°E	
Assault Glacier	Canterbury	43.310282°S 171.007349°E	
Avalanche Glacier	Otago	44.434062°S 168.751958°E	
Avoca Glacier	Canterbury	43.020433°S 171.41683°E	
Axius Glacier	Westland	44.16756°S 168.982746°E	
Baker Glacier	Canterbury	43.566667°S 170.319°E	
Baker Glacier	Otago, Westland	43.868917°S 169.830306°E	
Balfour Glacier	Westland	43.550139°S 170.089222°E	Date of naming is unclear, earliest reference to the name is 1881 but later sources indicate that it was in use before this.
Ball Glacier	Canterbury	43.619167°S 170.18175°E	
Banks Glacier	Westland	43.629556°S 170.059222°E	
Bannie Glacier	Canterbury	43.744667°S 169.99975°E	
Barkley Glacier	Canterbury	43.580194°S 170.278472°E	
Barlow Glacier	Westland	43.30741°S 170.631907°E	
Barrier Ice Stream	Otago	44.422825°S 168.351221°E	
Barron Glacier	Westland	43.201139°S 170.956444°E	
Baumann Glacier	Westland	43.465639°S 170.151556°E	
Beelzebub Glacier	Westland	43.307522°S 170.694027°E	Flows from the Garden of Eden Ice Plateau, part of a series of biblically-derived names in the area.
Beetham Glacier	Canterbury	43.565472°S 170.294028°E	
Beith Glacier	Westland	43.782361°S 169.9265°E	
Bell Glacier	Westland	44.265583°S 168.849778°E	
Birley Glacier	Otago	44.61145°S 168.420138°E	
Blair Glacier	Otago	43.986889°S 169.762361°E	
Blue Duck Glacier	Otago	44.484139°S 168.493306°E	
Blumenthal Glacier	Westland	43.490444°S 170.183389°E	
Bonar Glacier	Otago	44.394556°S 168.706722°E	
Bonney Glacier	Canterbury	43.551972°S 170.314528°E	
Boys Glacier	Canterbury	43.606944°S 170.176167°E	
Bracken Snowfield	Westland	43.194278°S 170.930806°E	
Breakaway	Otago	44.40525°S 168.702278°E	
Brewster Glacier	Westland	44.07625°S 169.435389°E	
Bruckner Glacier	Otago	44.494161°S 168.5531°E	
Bryant Glacier	Otago	44.824297°S 168.287713°E	
Burnett Glacier	Canterbury	43.608361°S 170.267056°E	
Burton Glacier	Westland	43.449472°S 170.321222°E	
Butcher Glacier	Canterbury	43.480972°S 170.594389°E	
Cahill Glacier	Canterbury	42.976849°S 171.390968°E	
Cain Glacier	Westland	43.329784°S 170.65442°E	
Callery Glacier	Westland	43.43575°S 170.339972°E	
Cameron Glacier	Canterbury	43.344194°S 171.005667°E	
Caroline Glacier	Canterbury	43.612972°S 170.161444°E	
Carrel Glacier	Westland	43.453611°S 170.205028°E	Named after Jean-Antoine Carrel
Cascade Glacier	Canterbury	43.576944°S 170.311361°E	
Castries Glacier	Westland	43.537667°S 170.117056°E	
Cerberus Glacier	Westland	43.480959°S 170.271561°E	
Chamberlin Snowfield	Westland	43.500444°S 170.233861°E	
Chancellor Glacier	Otago	44.499306°S 168.414194°E	
Charity Glacier	Otago	43.808611°S 169.925556°E	
Christopher Johnson Glacier	Otago	44.444801°S 168.636198°E	Named after Squadron Leader Christopher Johnson RNZAF, who died in a plane crash during a nearby search for two missing climbers in 1953.
Clarke Glacier	Canterbury	43.2535°S 170.881556°E	
Classen Glacier	Canterbury	43.486778°S 170.454306°E	
Cleves Glacier	Westland	43.538028°S 170.187222°E	
Cliff Glacier	Westland	43.008528°S 171.222917°E	
Climax Glacier	Otago	44.465624°S 168.35364°E	
Clover Glacier	Canterbury	43.374329°S 170.711363°E	
Cockayne Glacier	Canterbury	43.289425°S 170.863814°E	Presumed to be named after Leonard Cockayne. Tributary of Lyell Glacier.
Colin Campbell Glacier	Canterbury	43.331515°S 170.741459°E	Named by J B Acland in 1862 in honour of Colin Campbell, 1st Baron Clyde.
Constance Knox Glacier	Canterbury	43.511333°S 170.286111°E	
Copland Glacier	Westland	43.63695°S 170.08086°E	
Corry Glacier	Westland	43.49994°S 170.280943°E	
County Glacier	Westland	43.178417°S 170.914639°E	
Cronin Glacier	Canterbury	42.944194°S 171.391694°E	
Crow Glacier	Canterbury	42.915861°S 171.510722°E	
Croz Glacier	Westland	43.477361°S 170.176583°E	
Curzon Glacier	Otago	44.497222°S 168.471611°E	
Cuttance Glacier	Westland	43.608583°S 170.049528°E	
Dainty Glacier	Westland	43.232417°S 170.887361°E	
Dart Glacier	Otago	44.448861°S 168.60675°E	Source of the Dart River / Te Awa Whakatipu
Darwin Glacier	Canterbury	43.537083°S 170.315111°E	
David Glacier	Otago	44.099361°S 169.432167°E	
Davis Glacier	Otago	44.487111°S 168.553°E	
Davis Snowfield	Westland	43.519556°S 170.213028°E	
Dechen Glacier	Westland	43.8095°S 169.760306°E	
Dennistoun Glacier	Canterbury	43.457028°S 170.594444°E	
Dilemma Glacier	Otago	44.485824°S 168.363351°E	
Dipso Glacier	Westland	44.356111°S 168.707639°E	
Dispute Glacier	Westland	44.135236°S 168.959689°E	
Dixon Glacier	Canterbury	43.559944°S 170.351639°E	
Donald Glacier	Westland	44.238056°S 168.846778°E	
Donne Glacier	Canterbury	43.704889°S 170.028667°E	
Donne Glacier	Otago	44.590333°S 168.026083°E	
Dorothy Glacier	Canterbury	43.602528°S 170.252361°E	
Douglas Glacier	Canterbury	43.363639°S 170.990472°E	
Douglas Glacier	Westland	43.694278°S 169.987833°E	
Douglas Neve	Westland	43.680639°S 169.998278°E	
Dredgeburn Glacier	Otago	44.508277°S 168.324808°E	
Earnslaw Glacier	Otago	44.630534°S 168.402246°E	
Easter Glacier	Canterbury	43.470328°S 170.45195°E	
Edison Glacier	Westland	43.787806°S 169.774361°E	
Edwards Glacier	Westland	43.493768°S 170.298804°E	
Elcho Glacier	Otago	43.873312°S 169.838664°E	
Elizabeth Glacier	Canterbury	43.473972°S 170.465556°E	
Empress Glacier	Canterbury	43.60225°S 170.120528°E	
Eric Glacier	Westland	43.414036°S 170.625151°E	
Escape Glacier	Westland	43.274702°S 170.522979°E	
Essex Icefall	Westland	43.227167°S 170.877028°E	
Eugenie Glacier	Canterbury	43.676667°S 170.079667°E	
Evans Glacier	Westland	43.199972°S 170.908111°E	
Explorer Glacier	Westland	43.533806°S 170.196361°E	Tributary of Fox Glacier
Faraday Glacier	Canterbury	43.613889°S 170.387417°E	
Farrar Glacier	Westland	43.314908°S 170.633716°E	
Ferrier Glacier	Otago	44.472651°S 168.506464°E	
Ferryman Glacier	Westland	43.489306°S 170.132583°E	
Fettes Glacier	Westland	43.763333°S 169.873722°E	
Fiddian Glacier	Westland	43.674167°S 170.050278°E	
Findlay Glacier	Westland	44.323431°S 168.443906°E	
FitzGerald Glacier	Canterbury	43.466417°S 170.566667°E	
Fitzgerald Glacier	Westland	43.7205°S 170.02225°E	
Forbes Glacier	Canterbury	43.462472°S 170.6075°E	
Forrest Ross Glacier	Canterbury	43.547333°S 170.218306°E	
Foster Glacier	Otago	43.855361°S 169.843972°E	
Fox Glacier	Westland	43.501964°S 170.080783°E	Named after premier William Fox (politician). Officially titled Fox Glacier / Te Moeka o Tuawe with the passing of the Ngāi Tahu Claims Settlement Act 1998
Frances Glacier	Canterbury	43.316028°S 170.776111°E	
Frances Glacier	Otago	44.594184°S 168.39378°E	
Franz Josef Glacier	Westland	43.475331°S 170.199855°E	Named after Emperor Franz Josef I of Austria. Officially titled Franz Josef Glacier / Kā Roimata o Hine Hukatere with the passing of the Ngāi Tahu Claims Settlement Act 1998
Freshfield Glacier	Canterbury	43.577333°S 170.197361°E	Named during the first ascent of Aoraki / Mount Cook.
Frind Glacier	Canterbury	43.700829°S 170.041359°E	
Fritz Glacier	Westland	43.481083°S 170.16275°E	
Fyfe Glacier	Westland	43.713889°S 170.022556°E	
Garden of Allah Ice Plateau	Westland	43.307°S 170.727°E	
Garden of Eden Ice Plateau	Westland	43.325°S 170.682°E	
Geikie Glacier	Otago	44.478194°S 168.546889°E	
Geikie Snowfield	Westland	43.482417°S 170.238667°E	
Gem Glacier	Westland	43.524194°S 170.122806°E	
Gino Watkins Glacier	Westland	43.455611°S 170.4535°E	
Godley Glacier	Canterbury	43.449583°S 170.540056°E	
Goldney Glacier	Canterbury	42.912944°S 171.522972°E	
Grand Plateau	Canterbury	43.5865°S 170.169444°E	
Grant Glacier	Otago	44.56534°S 168.437617°E	
Grave Couloir	Southland	44.577917°S 167.979306°E	
Grave Glacier	Southland	44.594583°S 167.955693°E	
Grey Glacier	Canterbury	43.447111°S 170.478917°E	
Gridiron Glaciers	Canterbury	43.32121°S 171.014392°E	
Griffiths Glacier	Canterbury	42.985444°S 171.273333°E	
Gulch Glacier	Westland	43.602694°S 170.0615°E	
Haast Glacier	Canterbury	43.567028°S 170.202333°E	Named after Julius von Haast
Hall Glacier	Canterbury	42.95675°S 171.308722°E	
Hamilton Glacier	Otago	44.487066°S 168.483977°E	
Harper Glacier	Canterbury	43.530889°S 170.424694°E	
Haupapa / Tasman Glacier	Canterbury	43.665306°S 170.188806°E	Longest glacier in New Zealand and a prominent feature of Aoraki / Mount Cook National Park. Officially titled Haupapa / Tasman Glacier with the passing of the Ngāi Tahu Claims Settlement Act 1998
Havelock Glacier	Canterbury	43.353861°S 170.686139°E	
Hawkes Bay Glacier	Westland	43.834667°S 169.858083°E	
Hayter Glacier	Canterbury	43.67175°S 170.083333°E	
Hazard Glacier	Westland	43.234778°S 170.884833°E	
Hector Glacier	Canterbury	43.340438°S 170.833652°E	
Hecuba Glacier	Canterbury	43.347683°S 170.835861°E	
Heemskerck Glacier	Westland	43.553604°S 170.164946°E	Named by Charles Douglas after the ship used by Abel Tasman on his expedition to New Zealand.
Hesse Glacier	Otago	44.478389°S 168.574611°E	
Hobbs Glacier	Otago	44.481881°S 168.562069°E	
Hochstetter Glacier	Canterbury	43.591361°S 170.1885°E	Named after Ferdinand von Hochstetter
Hood Glacier	Otago	44.420736°S 168.747868°E	Named after aviator George Hood, who disappeared attempting to fly across the Tasman Sea
Hooker Glacier	Canterbury	43.662861°S 170.118389°E	Named by Julius von Haast after William Jackson Hooker.
Hooker Glacier	Westland	43.826056°S 169.656694°E	
Horace Walker Glacier	Westland	43.666917°S 169.931667°E	
Hour Glass Glacier	Canterbury	43.793167°S 169.978361°E	
Huddleston Glacier	Canterbury	43.688722°S 170.06425°E	
Hugh Ice	Westland	44.242278°S 168.8425°E	
Hunter Glacier	Westland	43.959126°S 169.674206°E	
Huxley Glacier	Canterbury	43.6055°S 170.400778°E	
Ice King Tops	Westland	44.243778°S 168.831861°E	
Iso Glacier	Westland	44.368861°S 168.697111°E	
Isobel Glacier	Otago	44.522694°S 168.634444°E	
Ivory Glacier	Westland	43.122805°S 170.916573°E	
Jack Glacier	Westland	43.809°S 169.638167°E	
Jackson Glacier	Westland	43.88975°S 169.790389°E	
Jagged Glacier	Canterbury	43.333851°S 171.016447°E	
Jalf Glacier	Westland	43.471083°S 170.139028°E	
Jasper Glacier	Westland	43.675167°S 170.034111°E	
Jaspur Glacier	Westland	43.181194°S 170.756694°E	
Jervois Glacier	Southland	44.783139°S 167.785472°E	
Jewel Glacier	Westland	43.526639°S 170.125222°E	
Joe Glacier	Otago	44.480153°S 168.37889°E	
Johannes Glacier	Westland	43.468987°S 170.314783°E	
John Inglis Glacier	Otago	44.433187°S 168.415523°E	
Joie de Vivre Glacier	Canterbury	43.505333°S 170.426889°E	
Jura Glacier	Otago	44.561667°S 168.419667°E	
Kahutea Glacier	Canterbury	43.012648°S 171.375309°E	
Kaufmann Glacier	Canterbury	43.557472°S 170.21175°E	
Kea Glacier	Westland	43.176889°S 170.798167°E	
Kilmarnock Glacier	Canterbury	42.957235°S 171.404965°E	
Kirk Glacier	Canterbury	43.346275°S 170.855378°E	
Kitchener Glacier	Otago	44.39716°S 168.766471°E	
Korako Glacier	Otago	44.685786°S 168.065998°E	
La Perouse Glacier	Westland	43.5775°S 170.059056°E	
Lambert Glacier	Westland	43.296844°S 170.767398°E	
Langdale Glacier	Canterbury	43.578111°S 170.270167°E	
Law Glacier	Westland	43.611306°S 170.05325°E	
Lawrence Glacier	Canterbury	43.324551°S 170.994549°E	
Le Blanc Glacier	Westland	43.778778°S 169.955139°E	
Lecky Glacier	Canterbury	43.596306°S 170.284083°E	
Leeb Glacier	Westland	43.219833°S 170.894889°E	
Leonard Glacier	Westland	43.440552°S 170.33087°E	
Limbo Glacier	Otago	44.362861°S 168.400111°E	
Linda Glacier	Canterbury	43.582861°S 170.151167°E	
Lindsay Glacier	Westland	44.000194°S 169.128833°E	
Liverpool Glacier	Otago	44.428028°S 168.614°E	
Lord Glacier	Westland	43.249944°S 170.858972°E	
Lornty Glacier	Westland	43.226361°S 170.888944°E	
Lower Volta Glacier	Westland	44.373°S 168.759306°E	
Lucas Glacier	Otago	44.384269°S 168.785114°E	
Lyell Glacier	Canterbury	43.306972°S 170.838389°E	
Lyttle Glacier	Westland	43.596528°S 169.983694°E	
Malcolm Glacier	Westland	43.294222°S 170.802556°E	
Malte-Brun Glacier	Canterbury	43.557007°S 170.294403°E	Named after Victor Adolphe Malte-Brun in association with the nearby mountain of the same name.
Mannering Glacier	Canterbury	43.54125°S 170.370861°E	
Maori Glacier	Westland	43.713694°S 169.961861°E	
Marchant Glacier	Westland	43.609256°S 170.017012°E	
Margaret Glacier	Otago	44.504132°S 168.359232°E	
Marmaduke Dixon Glacier	Canterbury	42.988448°S 171.383306°E	
Marshall Glacier	Otago	44.473556°S 168.585806°E	
Martius Glacier	Canterbury	43.219056°S 170.991861°E	
Mascarin Glacier	Westland	43.532278°S 170.098222°E	
Mathers Glacier	Westland	43.78525°S 169.695944°E	
Mattias Glacier	Westland	43.495944°S 170.160722°E	
Maud Francis Glacier	Otago	44.434498°S 168.731781°E	
Maud Glacier	Canterbury	43.445472°S 170.506889°E	
Mawson Glacier	Otago	43.988201°S 169.554002°E	
Mawson Glacier	Westland	43.4215°S 170.502333°E	
McCardell Glacier	Westland	43.79925°S 169.74475°E	
McCoy Glacier	Canterbury	43.321061°S 170.806857°E	
McCullaugh Glaciers	Westland	43.825306°S 169.618639°E	
McKenzie Glacier	Westland	43.172215°S 170.932464°E	
McKerrow Glacier	Westland	43.730806°S 169.982472°E	
Meg Glacier	Westland, Otago	43.935083°S 169.745444°E	
Melchior Glacier	Westland	43.498°S 170.191°E	
Melville Glacier	Otago	44.017799°S 169.591469°E	
Memorial Glacier	Otago	43.939583°S 169.750778°E	
Mercer Glacier	Otago	44.383186°S 168.589901°E	Named after J.C. Mercer, an early aviator around the Southern Alps
Merkl Glacier	Otago	44.506195°S 168.300534°E	
Metelille Glacier	Canterbury	43.757361°S 170.04225°E	
Milo Glacier	Canterbury	43.739972°S 170.01225°E	
Mona Glacier	Canterbury	43.628722°S 170.137278°E	
Monk Glacier	Canterbury	43.668246°S 170.280495°E	
Montague Glacier	Westland	43.476214°S 170.30379°E	
Monteith Glacier	Westland	44.27236°S 168.49662°E	
Moore Glacier	Otago	43.894944°S 169.793722°E	
Morse Glacier	Westland	43.678556°S 169.939639°E	
Morse Glacier	Westland	43.777444°S 169.700944°E	
Mueller Glacier	Canterbury	43.747278°S 170.020417°E	
Murchison Glacier	Canterbury	43.511972°S 170.391222°E	
Murphy Glacier	Canterbury	43.484049°S 170.611032°E	
Nansen Glacier	Westland	43.440835°S 170.461838°E	Named after Fridtjof Nansen, with other nearby glaciers also named after polar explorers.
Neave Glacier	Canterbury	43.080889°S 171.157556°E	
Neish Plateau	Canterbury	43.420333°S 170.532667°E	
Ngakanohi Glacier	Canterbury	43.719722°S 170.037278°E	
Noeline Glacier	Canterbury	43.617472°S 170.125861°E	
North Poerua Glacier	Westland	43.276639°S 170.640972°E	
Nuns Veil Glacier	Canterbury	43.700548°S 170.246136°E	
Ogilvie Glacier	Westland	44.294694°S 168.826056°E	
Olivine Ice Plateau	Westland	44.437588°S 168.37306°E	
Omatane Glacier	Westland	43.070152°S 171.1871°E	
O'Neil Glacier	Westland	43.287361°S 170.778889°E	
Onslow Glacier	Canterbury	43.584917°S 170.296583°E	
Otoko Glacier	Westland	43.829139°S 169.687167°E	
Outlaw Glacier	Canterbury	43.349503°S 170.875991°E	
Park Glacier	Otago	44.447667°S 168.593889°E	
Park Glacier	Westland	43.209944°S 170.952222°E	
Park Pass Glacier	Otago	44.590616°S 168.238947°E	
Pearl Drop Ice	Westland	44.253778°S 168.848889°E	
Pembroke Glacier	Southland	44.572884°S 167.879231°E	
Pench Glacier	Otago	44.439565°S 168.604502°E	
Perth Glacier	Westland	43.337861°S 170.694528°E	
Pickelhaube Glacier	Westland	44.225083°S 168.859694°E	
Pilkington Glacier	Westland	43.657861°S 169.928194°E	
Poerua Glacier	Westland	43.284222°S 170.623361°E	
Poet Glacier	Westland	43.744333°S 169.968389°E	
Prism Glacier	Westland	43.670528°S 170.023861°E	
Purity Glacier	Westland	44.323111°S 168.812583°E	
Radiant Glacier	Westland	43.270972°S 170.857083°E	
Ramsay Glacier	Canterbury	43.248694°S 170.910694°E	
Ranfurly Glacier	Canterbury	43.517667°S 170.273722°E	
Reay Glacier	Canterbury	43.598194°S 170.270278°E	
Reid Glacier	Otago	44.460418°S 168.625827°E	
Reischek Glacier	Canterbury	43.305437°S 170.98778°E	
Glacier	Otago, Canterbury	43.812083°S 169.9405°E	
Ridge Glacier	Canterbury	43.620361°S 170.360583°E	
Rob Roy Glacier	Otago	44.454999°S 168.750395°E	
Rolleston Glacier	Westland	42.890861°S 171.528722°E	Named after William Rolleston
Rollover Glacier	Canterbury	43.375889°S 170.726508°E	
Route Glacier	Westland	43.490639°S 170.149444°E	
Rudolf Glacier	Canterbury	43.539889°S 170.238861°E	
Ruth Glacier	Canterbury	43.439056°S 170.528278°E	
Saint James Glacier	Canterbury	43.276667°S 170.891444°E	
Sale Glacier	Westland	43.217944°S 170.951639°E	
Salisbury Snowfield	Westland	43.468611°S 170.220667°E	
Sapphire Glacier	Westland	43.260028°S 170.855222°E	
Scabbard Glacier	Canterbury	43.393689°S 170.654291°E	
Scone Glacier	Westland	43.411056°S 170.542889°E	
Scott Glacier	Westland	43.669917°S 169.994806°E	
Sealey Glacier	Otago	44.371181°S 168.400036°E	
Selwyn Glacier	Canterbury	43.774389°S 169.980778°E	
Separation Glacier	Canterbury	43.476667°S 170.576806°E	
Serpent Glacier	Westland	43.328468°S 170.628385°E	
Shackleton Glacier	Westland	43.403°S 170.5085°E	
Shanks Glacier	Canterbury	43.323417°S 170.812194°E	
Sheila Glacier	Canterbury	43.59225°S 170.123417°E	
Shelf Glacier	Westland	43.185679°S 170.932479°E	
Siege Glacier	Westland	43.26867°S 170.535546°E	
Silver Glacier	Otago	44.412083°S 168.34825°E	
Sladden Glacier	Canterbury	43.759778°S 170.024694°E	
Smyth Glacier	Otago	43.959939°S 169.596408°E	
Snow White Glacier	Otago	44.443884°S 168.576532°E	
Snowball Glaciers	Otago	44.463389°S 168.499389°E	
Sombrosy Glacier	Westland	44.163159°S 168.833135°E	
South Cameron Glacier	Canterbury	43.354917°S 170.983306°E	
South Forbes Glacier	Canterbury	43.470556°S 170.597389°E	
Spa Glacier	Westland	43.467296°S 170.24111°E	
Spanish Grass Glacier	Westland	43.117435°S 170.864132°E	
Spence Glacier	Westland	43.761556°S 169.967639°E	
Spencer Glacier	Westland	43.465528°S 170.277361°E	
Spur Glacier	Westland	43.770056°S 169.861278°E	
St Winifred Glacier	Canterbury	43.428195°S 170.627913°E	
Stevenson Glacier	Westland	43.489558°S 170.308925°E	
Stewart Glacier	Canterbury	43.664694°S 170.088583°E	
Stewart Glacier	Canterbury	43.077802°S 171.203136°E	
Strachan Glacier	Westland	43.786056°S 169.798583°E	
Strauchon Glacier	Westland	43.617889°S 170.063944°E	
Styx Glacier	Westland	43.488154°S 170.275729°E	
Suet Glacier	Westland	44.347639°S 168.712778°E	
Sunbeam Glacier	Westland	43.248667°S 170.834944°E	
Surprise Glacier	Canterbury	43.563083°S 170.405917°E	
Sustins Glacier	Canterbury	43.470896°S 170.43709°E	
Tartarus Icefall	Otago	44.353427°S 168.83167°E	
Te Puoho Glacier	Southland	44.669057°S 168.050662°E	
TearDrop Ice	Westland	44.241265°S 168.826341°E	
Tekano Glacier	Westland	43.670028°S 170.012361°E	
Tewaewae Glacier	Canterbury	43.681667°S 170.071333°E	
Therma Glacier	Westland	44.372528°S 168.718306°E	
Throne Glacier	Canterbury	43.361828°S 170.699904°E	
Thunder Glacier	Otago	44.468333°S 168.346861°E	
Thurneysen Glacier	Otago	44.163842°S 169.598069°E	Named after Swiss theologian Eduard Thurneysen. Renamed in 2003 to correct a misspelling
Times Glacier	Westland	43.486167°S 170.300194°E	
Toby Glacier	Westland	44.349357°S 168.439384°E	
Topaz Glacier	Westland	43.287472°S 170.816222°E	
Tornado Glacier	Otago	44.367861°S 168.418111°E	
Townsend Glacier	Westland	43.752528°S 169.899°E	
Trident Glacier	Canterbury	43.458696°S 170.572008°E	
Trinity Glacier	Otago	44.391315°S 168.385901°E	
Tuckett Glacier	Canterbury	43.688889°S 170.053056°E	
Turnbull Glacier	Canterbury	43.546211°S 170.300599°E	
Tyndall Glacier	Otago	44.535919°S 168.628711°E	
Upper Volta Glacier	Westland	44.350361°S 168.786528°E	
Victoria Glacier	Otago	44.474653°S 168.466077°E	
Victoria Glacier	Westland	43.498306°S 170.140194°E	
Volta Glacier	Westland	44.362715°S 168.766155°E	
Vulcan Glacier	Otago	44.363243°S 168.794838°E	
Walpole Glacier	Canterbury	43.583361°S 170.268472°E	
Ward Glacier	Westland	43.863806°S 169.835028°E	
Wee McGregor Glacier	Canterbury	43.33988°S 170.721117°E	
Welchman Glacier	Canterbury	43.752028°S 169.987333°E	
Whataroa Glacier	Westland	43.400806°S 170.526667°E	
Wheeler Glacier	Canterbury	43.561694°S 170.338417°E	
Whitbourn Glacier	Otago	44.461389°S 168.55175°E	
Whitcombe Glacier	Westland	43.754694°S 169.885778°E	
White Glacier	Canterbury	43.001067°S 171.384202°E	
Whitehead Glacier	Otago	44.424389°S 168.424749°E	
Whymper Glacier	Westland	43.478639°S 170.359778°E	
Wicks Glacier	Westland	43.680833°S 169.954111°E	
Wigley Glacier	Westland	43.402406°S 170.352141°E	Named after the Wigley family, early pioneers of development at the Hermitage Hotel, Mount Cook Village
Wilkinson Glacier	Westland	43.185222°S 170.948806°E	
Willberg Glacier	Westland	43.236199°S 170.844739°E	
Williams Glacier	Canterbury	43.759889°S 170.013306°E	
Wilson Glacier	Westland	43.957639°S 169.645056°E	
Zircon Glacier	Westland	43.752501°S 169.852505°E	
Zora Glacier	Westland	43.744333°S 169.8275°E	

== See also ==
- List of glaciers
- Glaciers of New Zealand
