= Rob Roy Peak =

Mountain in New Zealand

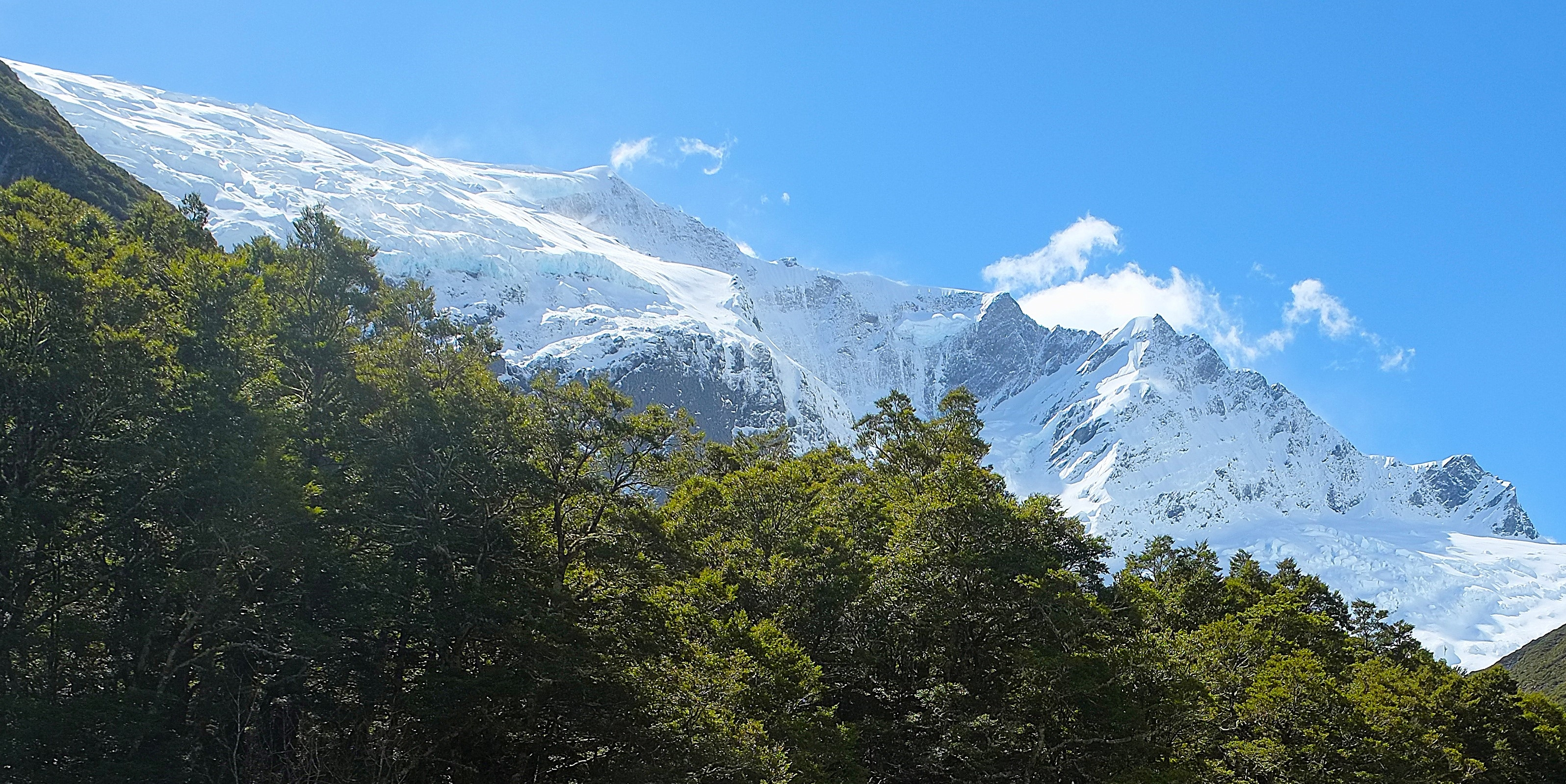
- South aspect

Highest point
- Elevation: 2,644 m (8,675 ft)
- Prominence: 458 m (1,503 ft)
- Isolation: 7.51 km (4.67 mi)
- Listing: Highest mountains of New Zealand
- Coordinates: 44.451684°S 168.722569°E

Naming
- Etymology: Rob Roy MacGregor

Geography
- Location within New Zealand
- Interactive map of Rob Roy Peak
- Location: South Island
- Country: New Zealand
- Region: Otago
- Protected area: Mount Aspiring National Park
- Parent range: Southern Alps
- Topo map: Topo50 CA11

Climbing
- First ascent: 2 March 1935

Rob Roy Peak is a 2,644-metre-elevation (8,675-foot) mountain in Otago, New Zealand.

== Description ==
Rob Roy Peak is located in the Southern Alps of the South Island. It is also within Mount Aspiring National Park which is part of the Te Wahipounamu UNESCO World Heritage Site. Precipitation runoff from the mountain's slopes drains to the Matukituki River. Topographic relief is significant as the summit rises 2,144 metres (7,034 feet) above the west branch of this river in four kilometres, and 1,800 metres (5,906 feet) above Rob Roy Stream in two kilometres. The nearest higher neighbour is Mount Aspiring / Tititea, seven kilometres to the north. Rob Roy Peak was named after Scottish folk hero Rob Roy MacGregor (1671–1734). This mountain's toponym has been officially approved by the New Zealand Geographic Board. The first ascent of the summit was made on 2 March 1935.

== Climate ==
Based on the Köppen climate classification, Rob Roy Peak is located in a marine west coast climate zone, with a subpolar oceanic climate (Cfc) at the summit. Prevailing westerly winds blow moist air from the Tasman Sea onto the mountain, where the air is forced upwards by the mountains (orographic lift), causing moisture to drop in the form of rain and snow. This climate supports the Maud Francis Glacier and Rob Roy Glacier on the mountain's slopes. The months of December through February offer the most favourable weather for viewing or climbing this peak.

== Climbing ==
Climbing routes with first ascents:

- South Ridge / Rob Roy Glacier – Ernie Smith, Monty McClymont, Cedric Benzoni, Bob Fullerton, George Palmer, Don Divers, Russell Edwards, George Edwards, and Gordon Edwards – (1935)
- North Ridge – Paul Powell, Frank Cooper – (1954)
- East Ridge – Tony Bowden, Graham Bishop – (1963)
- From Aspiring Hut (West Face) – Don Morrison, Peter Child – (1964)
- South Face Original Line – Bob Cunninghame, Limbo Thompson, Pete Glasson – (1972)
- South East Corner (South Face) – Pete Moore – (1972)
- North Face – Bruce Robertson, Laurie Kennedy – (1975)
- A Couple of Days (South Face) – Dave Vass, Allan Uren – (1997)
- South West Ridge – Phil Penney, Simon Harris – (1998)
- The Zone (South Face) – Craig Jefferies, Steve Moffat, Gareth Sharp – (1999)
- North West Ridge – FA unknown
- North East Face – FA unknown

== Gallery ==
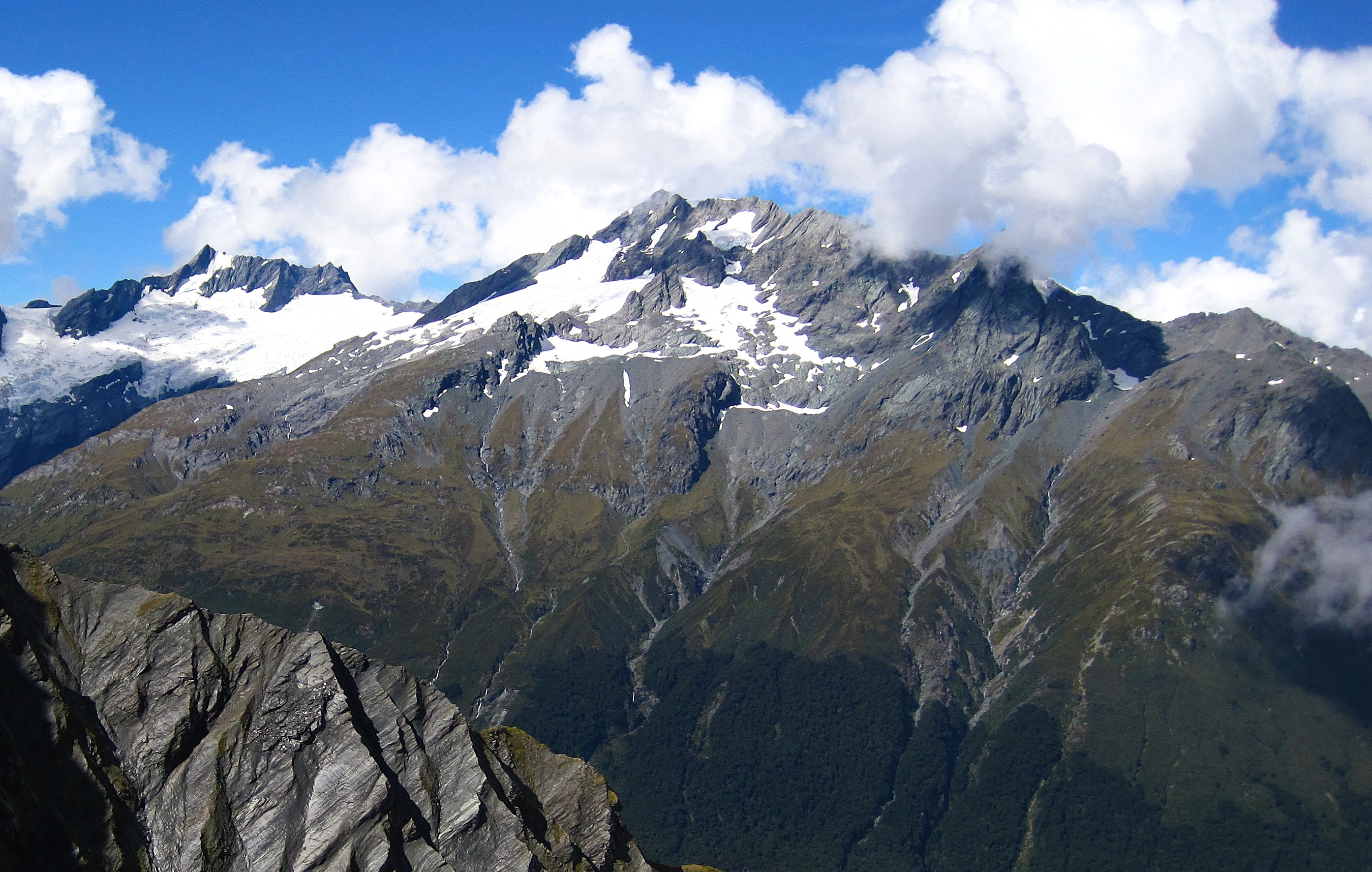
West aspect centred. (Mount Avalanche to left)

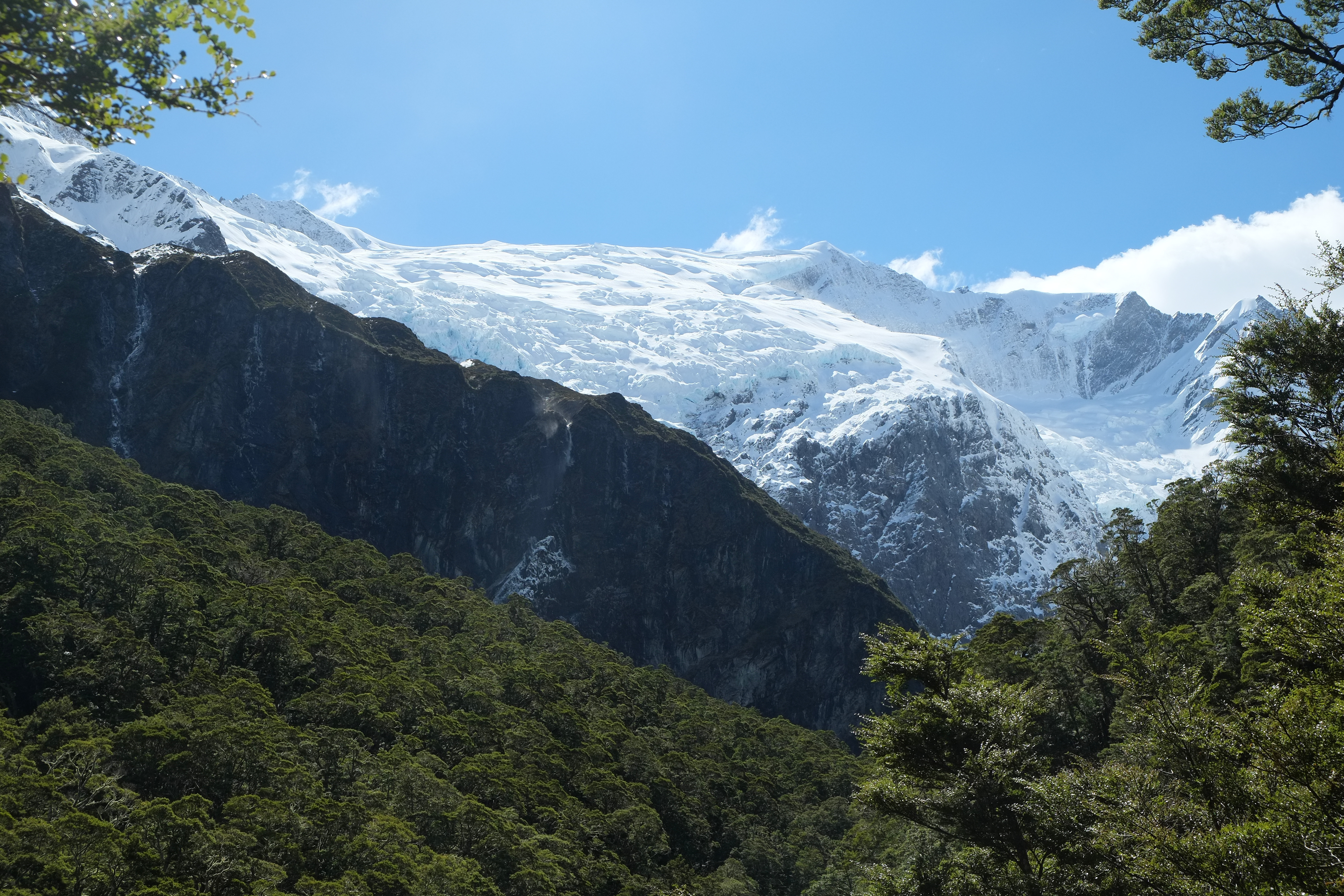
Rob Roy Peak and Rob Roy Glacier from south

== See also ==
- List of mountains of New Zealand by height
