= Rob Roy Glacier =

Small glacier in New Zealand

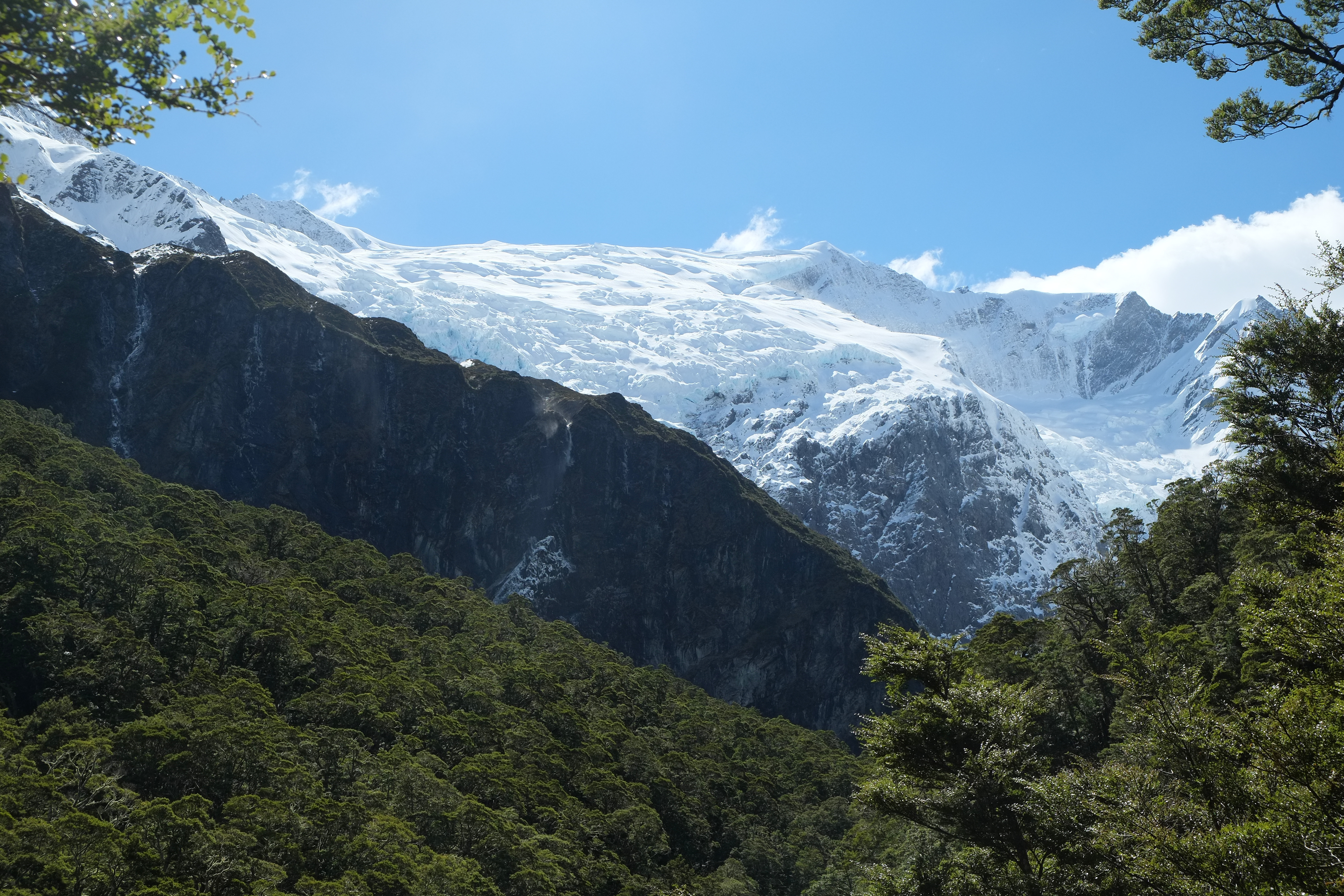
- Rob Roy Glacier from below in the Rob Roy Valley
- Interactive map of Rob Roy Glacier
- Type: Hanging
- Location: Mount Aspiring National Park
- Coordinates: 44°28′0″S 168°43′0″E
- Highest elevation: 2,644 metres (8,675 ft)
- Lowest elevation: 1,500 metres (4,900 ft)

The Rob Roy Glacier is a small hanging glacier in the Southern Alps of New Zealand's South Island. It is located within the Mount Aspiring National Park, 9 kilometres (6 mi) south of Mount Aspiring / Tititea.

The glacier covers the steep slopes of the mountains surrounding the head of the Rob Roy Valley. The most prominent part of the glacier is on the northwestern side of the valley on the slopes below the 2,644 metres (8,675 ft) tall Rob Roy Peak. This part of the glacier extends from just below Rob Roy Peak down to a bench high on the valley's side where it abruptly breaks over the cliff's edge at around 1,500 metres (4,900 ft).

The glacier covers most of the headwalls encircling the valley, except the eastern side where the bordering peaks are all just below 2,000 metres (6,600 ft). The spring melt causes frequent small avalanches, and seracs breaking off the glacier's terminal face on the northwestern side of the valley. Bigger blocks of ice can tumble and crash all the way to the valley floor.

== History ==
In the distant past, Rob Roy Glacier extended not only to fill all of the Rob Roy Valley, but flowed into the large Matukituki Glacier at the peak of the last ice age around 20,000 years ago. The Matukituki Glacier later combined with the Wānaka Glacier, also non-existent anymore, to form a continuous river of ice all the way down the Clutha Valley to close to where Cromwell is now. Now all that remains of Rob Roy Glacier is a hanging glacier at the valley head.

The Rob Roy Valley leading out into the Matukituki Valley is now covered with lush beech forest and an open understory of ferns and mosses. The forest supports small birds such as fantail, tomtit and rifleman, while above the tree line kea can be heard and seen regularly.

Rob Roy Peak was named after Scottish hero Rob Roy MacGregor when the first Europeans began exploring this area and began farming in the Matukituki Valley in the 1870s.

== Tourism ==
Rob Roy Glacier has a history of attracting expeditions and tourists for over 100 years. Since the 1920s, access across Mt Aspiring Station into Mount Aspiring National Park has been allowed by four generations of the Aspinall family.

The Rob Roy Valley Track is a popular walk of 3–4 hours return and leads to a sub-alpine basin at the valley head and a lookout across the valley to Rob Roy Glacier. Apart from the drive to get there, it is the most easily accessible glacier in the region. About 20,000 people visit Rob Roy Glacier per year. The walking track starts at the Raspberry Creek car park and shelter at the end of the Wanaka Mount Aspiring Road, which is unsealed for the last 30 kilometres (19 mi) and a "fine weather only" road for the very last 10 kilometres, crossing seven fords.

The track starts off on farmland and then crosses the Matukituki River via a swing bridge before following Rob Roy Stream to climb 330 metres (1,080 ft) up into the Rob Roy Valley. The end point is a lookout just above the tree line overlooking the valley head and across the valley to Rob Roy Glacier dramatically breaking over the rock ledge towering high above on the other side of the valley.

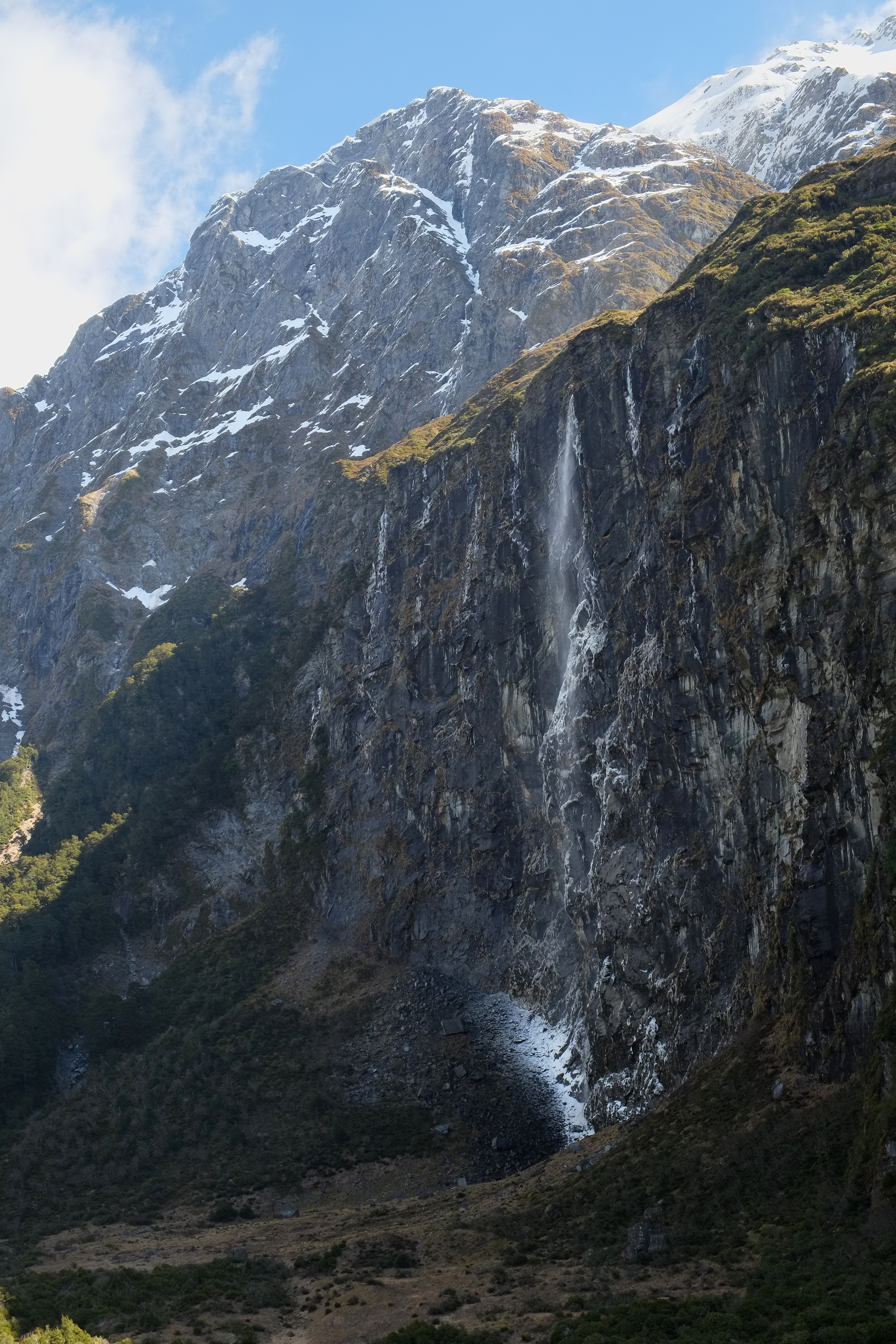
261m tall snowfall (freezing Rob Roy Falls)

Avalanches and ice blocks breaking off the glacier's terminal face are a regular sight in spring, and kea can often be heard and seen flying above. Also clearly visible are the 261 metres (856 ft) tall Rob Roy Falls, free-falling down a sheer cliff face south of Rob Roy Glacier. On cold sunny days, the meltwater from the glacier and snow on the sunlit slopes above can re-freeze as it falls through the cold air in the shade of the cliff, depositing again as ice and snow at the base of the waterfall.

The walking track is publicly accessible for independent walking, but can also be done as part of a guided tour from Wānaka. A regular shuttle service for trampers is also available, as Raspberry Creek shelter is also the start of longer hiking trails into Mount Aspiring National Park.

In 2015, wingsuit flier David Walden leapt from a cliff at the top of Rob Roy Low Peak (2560 m) and was the first person to fly over Rob Roy Glacier and into the valley below via BASE jumping.

== See also ==
- Glaciers of New Zealand
