= Glaciers of New Zealand =

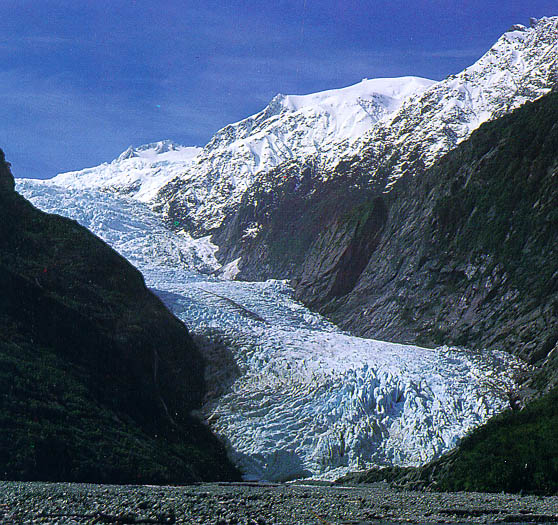
Franz Josef Glacier.

New Zealand contains many glaciers, mostly located near the Main Divide of the Southern Alps in the South Island. They are classed as mid-latitude mountain glaciers. There are eight small glaciers in the North Island on Mount Ruapehu.

An inventory of South Island glaciers compiled in the 1980s indicated there were about 3,155 glaciers with an area of at least one hectare (2.5 acres). Approximately one sixth of these glaciers covered more than 10 hectares. These include:

- Fox Glacier
- Franz Josef Glacier
- Hooker Glacier
- Mueller Glacier
- Murchison Glacier
- Tasman Glacier
- Volta Glacier

New Zealand's territorial claim in Antarctica, the Ross Dependency, also contains many glaciers.

== Retreat of glaciers ==
The Mueller, Hooker and Tasman glaciers have continued to retreat rapidly in recent years. Notice the larger terminal lakes, the retreat of the white ice (ice free of moraine cover), and the higher moraine walls due to ice thinning. Photo.

New Zealand glaciers have been retreating since 1890, with an acceleration of this retreat since 1920. Most of the glaciers have thinned measurably and have reduced in size, and the snow accumulation zones have risen in elevation during the 20th century. In the period 1971–75, Ivory Glacier receded 30 m (98 ft) from the glacial terminus, and about 26% of the surface area of the glacier was lost over the same period.

Since 1980 numerous small glacial lakes were created behind the new terminal moraines of several of these glaciers. Glaciers such as Classen, Godley and Douglas now all have new glacial lakes below their terminal locations due to the glacial retreat over the past 20 years. Satellite imagery indicates that these lakes are continuing to expand. There has been significant and ongoing losses of ice volumes on the largest glaciers: the Tasman, Ivory, Classen, Mueller, Maud, Hooker, Grey, Godley, Ramsay, Murchison, Therma, Volta and Douglas Glaciers. The retreat of these glaciers has been marked by expanding proglacial lakes and terminus region thinning. The loss in volume from 1975–2005 is 11 percent of the total. Several glaciers, notably the much-visited Fox and Franz Josef Glaciers on the West Coast, have periodically advanced, especially during the 1990s, but the scale of these advances is small when compared to 20th-century retreat. Both glaciers are currently more than 2.5 km (1.6 mi) shorter than a century ago. These large, rapidly flowing glaciers situated on steep slopes have been very reactive to small mass-balance changes. A few years of conditions favourable to glacier advance, such as more westerly winds and a resulting increase in snowfall, are rapidly echoed in a corresponding advance, followed by equally rapid retreat when those favourable conditions end. Hence glacier advance in a few locations is regarded as due to transient local weather conditions which brought more precipitation and cloudier, cooler summers since 2002.

== See also ==
- List of glaciers in New Zealand
- Climate change in New Zealand
- List of glaciers in the Antarctic
- Retreat of glaciers since 1850
