= Kitchener River =

- Route of the Kitchener River
- Mouth of the Kitchener River Kitchener River (New Zealand)

Location
- Country: New Zealand
- Region: Otago
- District: Queenstown-Lakes District

Physical characteristics
- Source: Kitchener Glacier
  - coordinates: 44.4061°S 168.7619°E
- Mouth
  - location: Matukituki River East Branch
  - coordinates: 44°24′47″S 168°49′36″E

Basin features
- Progression: Kitchener River → Matukituki River East Branch → Matukituki River → Lake Wakatipu → Kawarau River → Lake Dunstan → Clutha River → Pacific Ocean
- Tributaries
  - left: Rainbow Stream
  - right: Spurling Creek

The Kitchener River is a river in the Otago region of New Zealand. and a tributary of the Matukituki River.

== Geography ==
The river's source is the glacier located in the Kitchener Cirque. It flows east through Turnbull Thomson Falls and then into Aspiring Flats to become a tributary of the Matukituki River.

== See also ==
- List of rivers of New Zealand
