= Matukituki River =

River in the South Island of New Zealand

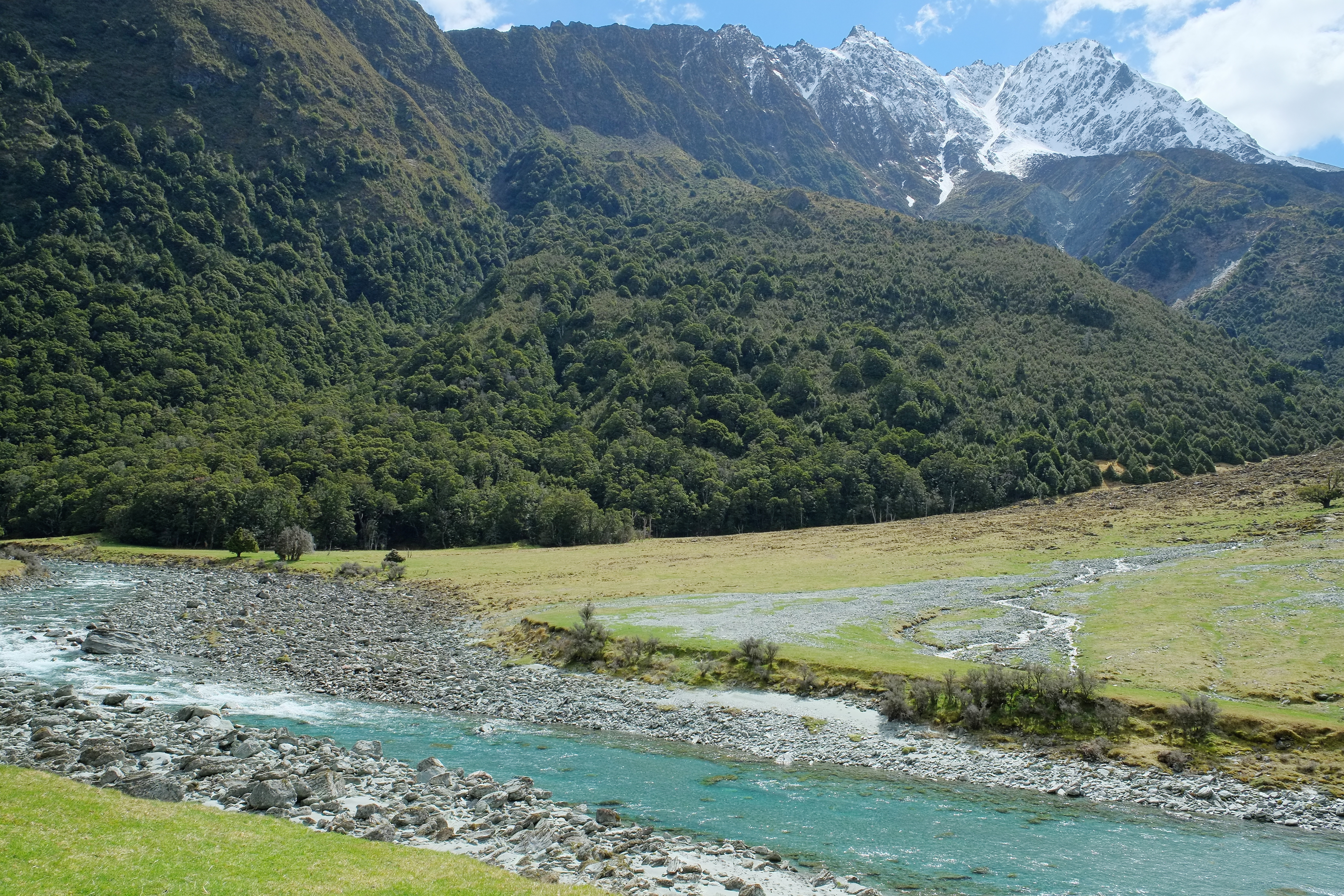
- Matukituki River West Branch
- Route of the Makarora River
- Mouth of the Makarora River Matukituki River (New Zealand)
- Native name: Mātakitaki (Māori)

Location
- Country: New Zealand
- Region: Otago
- District: Queenstown-Lakes

Physical characteristics
- Source: Matukituki River East Branch
  - coordinates: 44.3168°S 168.8758°E
- 2nd source: Matukituki River West Branch
  - coordinates: 44.4008°S 168.6776°E
- Mouth
  - location: Lake Wānaka
  - coordinates: 44°37′16″S 169°00′32″E
  - elevation: 300 m (980 ft)
- Length: 50 km (31 mi)

Basin features
- Progression: Matukituki River → Lake Wānaka → Clutha River / Mata-Au → Pacific Ocean
- Tributaries
  - left: Hester Pinney Creek (east branch), Rob Roy Creek (west branch), MacPherson Creek (west branch),
  - right: Homestead Creek (east branch), Glacier Burn (east branch), Kitchener River (east branch), Ruth Stream (east branch), Liverpool Stream (west branch), Rough Creek (west branch), Cascade Creek (west branch), Red Rock Stream (west branch), Brides Veil Stream (west branch), Wilsons Camp Stream (west branch), Downs Creek (west branch), Big Creek (west branch), Raspberry Creek (west branch), Wishbone Creek (west branch), Sheepyard Creek (west branch),

The Matukituki River is a short braided river in the Southern Alps of New Zealand's South Island. Both its West Branch and East Branch originate from the Main Divide mountain ranges near Mount Aspiring / Tititea. Their largely glacier-fed waters each flow for approximately 20 kilometres (12 mi) before joining near Camerons Flat. After this confluence, the Matukituki River leaves the boundaries of Mount Aspiring National Park and continues for another 30 kilometres (19 mi) to exit into Lake Wānaka at the lake's southwestern edge.

Six glaciers feed tributary streams to the Matukituki River, the largest being the Upper Volta Glacier, Rob Roy Glacier, Maud Francis Glacier, and the Avalanche Glacier.

From Camerons Flat onwards, the river is increasingly braided until it passes through a narrow gorge and under the West Wanaka bridge just before Lake Wānaka.

== History ==
Most of the Southern Alps started over 220 million years ago as sediment and rock on top of volcanic rocks on the seafloor. Intense heat and pressure consolidated the rock, and then uplifted it to form the Main Divide. The present landscape was shaped by glacial processes during the ice ages, when huge glaciers filled and scoured out the valleys.

The area around Mount Aspiring, called Tititea by the Māori, has a long history of Māori tribes coming from as far as Coastal Otago and the Foveaux Strait to the inland lakes to collect kākāpō, kererū, kākā and tūī from the forest. Moa would have also lived along the forest edges for the first 200 years of Māori settlement.

The historic Māori iwi (tribes) of Kāti Māmoe and Ngāi Tahu both had named settlements around the shores of Lakes Wānaka and Hāwea, including Nehenehe on the northern banks of the mouth of the Matukituki River, which they called "Mātakitaki". Ovens for cooking tī kōuka (cabbage tree) roots have been found at several sites on the lake shore. Ngāi Tahu kaumātua recorded Mātakitaki as a kāinga mahinga kai (food-gathering place) for tuna (eels), kāuru (cabbage tree root), and aruhe (bracken fernroot).

The first European to see Mount Aspiring was government surveyor John Turnbull Thompson in 1857. The West Matukituki Valley was explored by James Hector in 1862. Sheep and cattle farming began progressing up the valley in the 1870s.

== Fauna and flora ==
Today, beech is the dominant forest in the Matukituki Valley. Red beech prefers warmer valley sites, and is common just below Aspiring Hut. Silver beech grows increasingly towards the wetter, western end of the valley, while mountain beech dominates the drier, eastern end. The understory of the typically open forests supports a variety of ferns and mosses. Above the tree line, at about 1,100 metres (3,600 ft), stunted, sub-alpine shrub land gives way to alpine tussock grasslands and fell fields.

Insect-eating birds such as pīwakawaka, tomtit and rifleman thrive in the beech forest, whereas the seed-eating kākāriki specifically prefers areas of red beech. Paradise shelduck thrive on the river flats, and in summer, spur-winged plover and oystercatchers are a common sight on farmland and along the drive from Wānaka. The valley is also home to the kea, whio, South Island robin, rock wren, the South Island long tailed bat, and several species of lizards.

== Tourism ==
The Matukituki River valley is home to a ski resort (Treble Cone), a jetboat operator (River Journeys) and numerous tramping (walking) trails providing access to landmarks such as the Rob Roy Glacier, the Dart Saddle, and the Cascade Saddle. The unsealed Wanaka - Mount Aspiring Road follows the river's true right for most of its course, past the confluence of the East Branch and West Branch, and part-way along the West Branch to a Department of Conservation NZ car park at the Raspberry Creek shelter.

The most popular walk in the area is the Rob Roy Glacier walk, which leads up a side valley to a view point beneath Rob Roy Glacier. The walking track crosses the Matukituki River West Branch over a swing bridge.

== Gallery ==
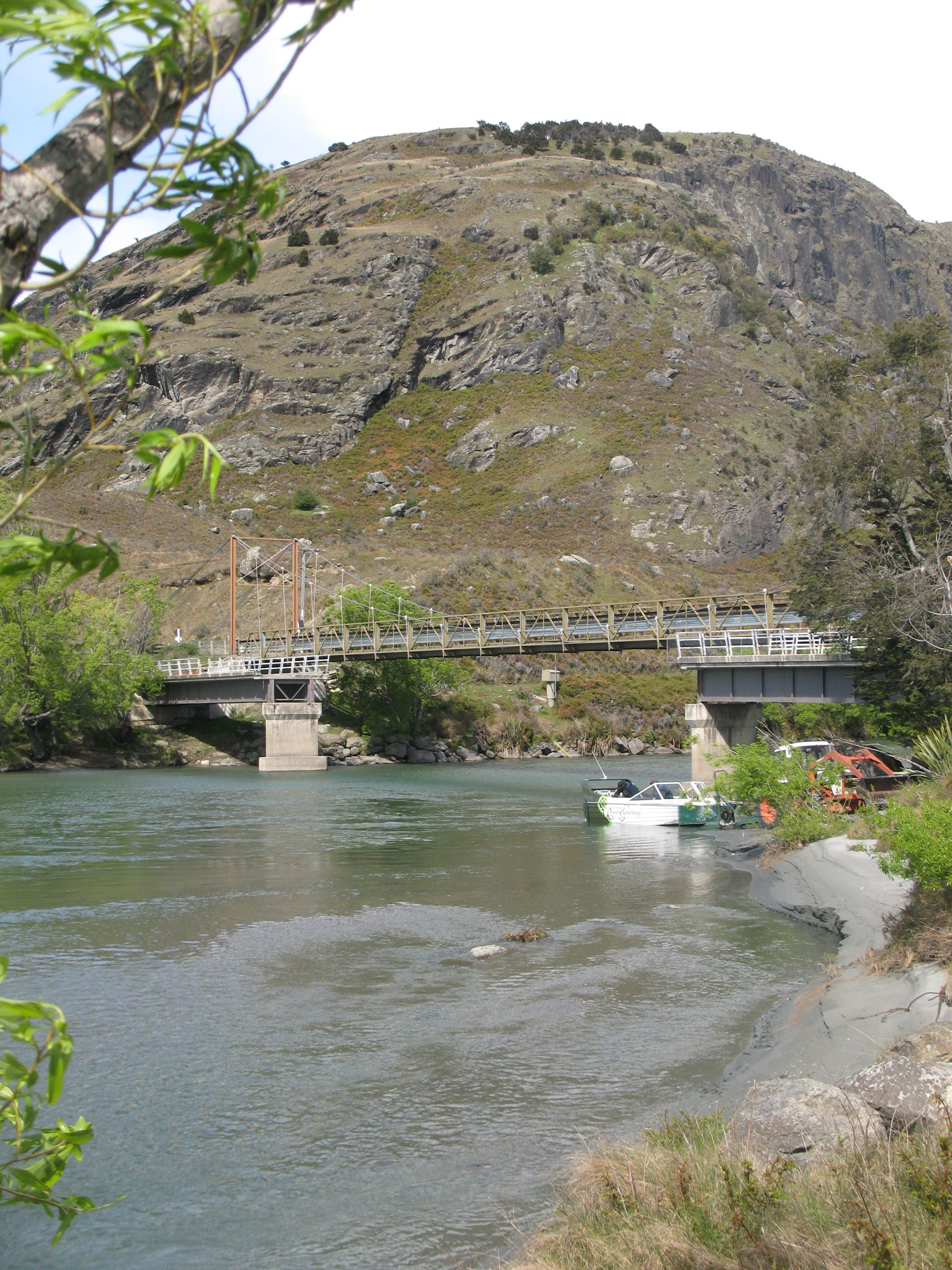
The West Wanaka Bridge

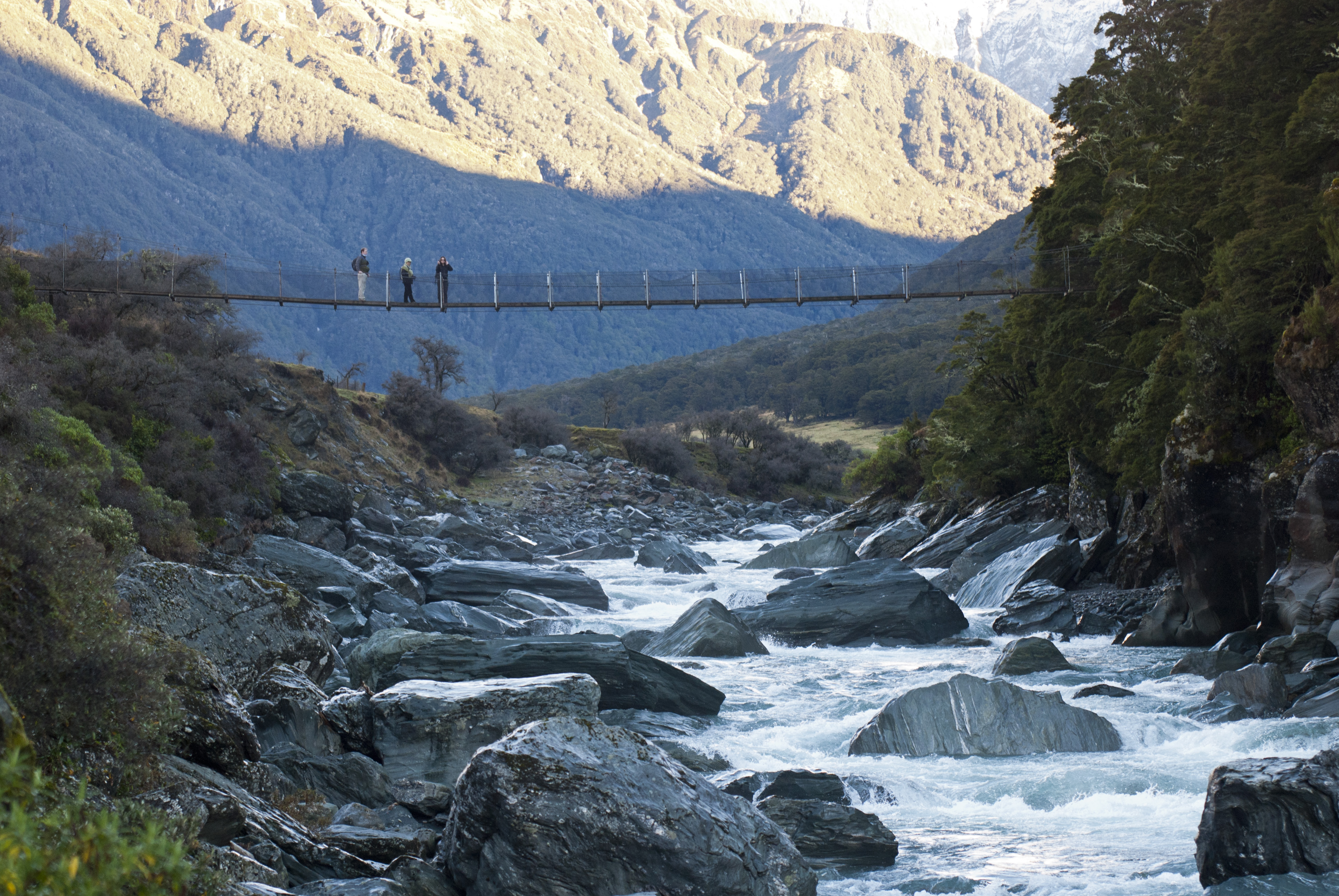
The Rob Roy Glacier walk

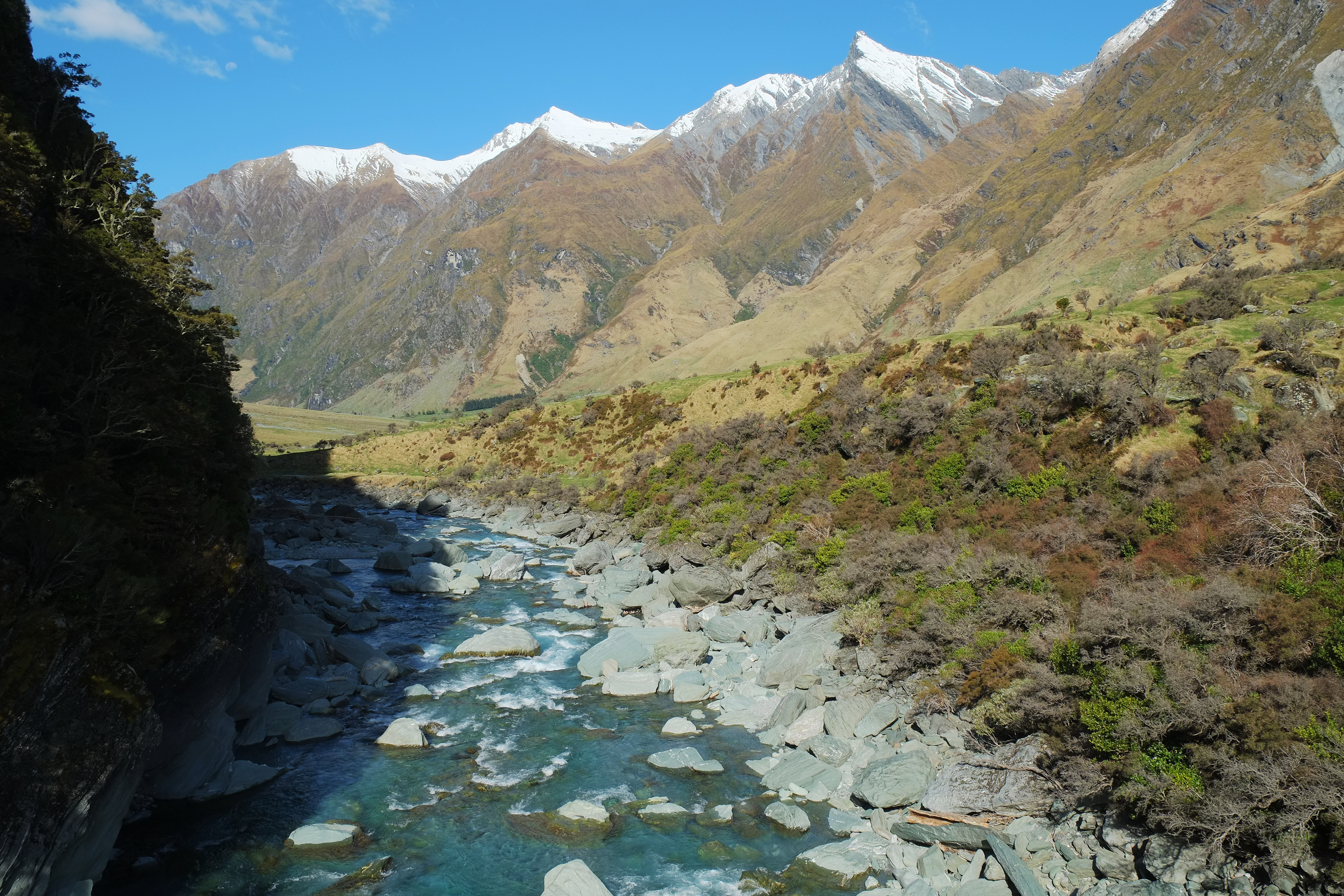
Matukituki River West Branch looking towards Sharks Tooth Peak
