= Volta Glacier =

Glacier in the Southern Alps, New Zealand

- Location within New Zealand
- Type: Ice field
- Location: Mount Aspiring / Tititea, Southern Alps / Kā Tiritiri o te Moana
- Coordinates: 44°21′S 168°47′E
- Length: 9 km (5.6 mi)
- Width: 1.2 km (0.75 mi)
- Highest elevation: 2,360 m (7,740 ft)
- Lowest elevation: 1,050 m (3,440 ft)
- Status: Declining

The Volta Glacier is located in Mount Aspiring National Park in the Southern Alps of the South Island of New Zealand.

It is split into upper and lower glaciers which are connected by an icefall. The Upper Volta Glacier is between 1,600–2,000 m (5,200–6,600 ft) in altitude and is surrounded by the 3 peaks of Glacier Dome, Pickelhaube and Fastness Peak, while the Lower Volta Glacier sits directly under the North side of Mount Aspiring / Tititea and lies between 1,000–1,400 m (3,300–4,600 ft). The Lower Volta Glacier feeds an unnamed lake at the Glacier Toe, which in turn feeds the Waiatoto River which eventually runs out to the West Coast.
